= Kasapin =

Town in Ahafo region, Ghana

- Town
- Location within Ghana
- Coordinates: 6°56′34″N 2°48′26″W
- Country: Ghana
- Region: Ahafo Region
- District: Asunafo North Municipal District
- Time zone: GMT
  - Summer (DST): GMT

Kasapin is a town in the Asunafo North Municipal District of the Ahafo Region of Ghana. The town borders the Bono Region and the Western North Region by the Bia River. Kasapin is about 30 km from Mim and it is a strategic location for trade, commerce, and cultural exchange. The community is noted for Wiredu Brempong Senior High Technical School and Danak Experimental Prep Junior High School.

== Economy ==
Residents of Kasapin are predominantly farmers with cocoa being the major cash crop grown in the area. Several cocoa purchasing depots are sited in the town due to the abundance of the cash crop.

Kasapin has Tuesday-weekly market where traders converge to transact their business. This market draws traders & buyers from places such as Accra, Kumasi, Mim, Goaso and Kwadwo Addaikrom.

A food processing company, Golden finger, is setting up in Kasapin to leverage on the abundance of agricultural produce in the area.

Apart from the agriculture, several timber firms are located in the town. Unfortunately, most of these firms engage in illegal felling of trees which is contributing to rapid depletion of the forest reserve.

== Security Challenges ==
The surge in illegal logging activities in the forest reserves has led to a series of suspicious deaths, possibly related to the illegal activities.For some time now, residents of Kasapin have been grappling with suspected ritual murders, a disturbing situation that has led to a heavy security presence in the area.
