= Ghana Greentech Academy =

Private high school in Mim, Ghana

- Mim Technical Academy

Location
- Ahafo Region; Box 51, Mim; Ghana
- Coordinates: 6°54′14″N 2°34′33″W

Information
- Type: Coeducational private Senior high school
- Established: 2014; 12 years ago
- Founders: Wallevik family
- Chair: Lars Wallevik
- Headmaster: William Amegah
- Gender: Boys & girls
- Age: 15 to 19
- Enrolment: 65
- Colours: black & white
- Website: www.ghanagreentech.org

Ghana Greentech Academy is a secondary educational institution in Ghana and operates as a co-educational, non-denominational, Day School.

It's a technical & Vocational school which started in 2014 as Mim Technical Academy and later in 2016, rebranded itself as Ghana Greentech Academy.

With donor support, the school provides tuition free education to young boys and girls in the Agriculture and Technical fields.

This school is located about 5 km away from the famous Mim Bour tourist site at Mim Ahafo, in the Asunafo North Municipal District of Ghana.

In order to guarantee the thorough development of all students, the school only accepts a maximum of 25 new students per year. This school prepares students for the working world by requiring not just good grades, but innovation and creativity as well.

Training in this school takes a three-year duration. In addition to focusing on Agric and electrical engineering, the school also offer courses in English, mathematics, IT, social studies, and natural sciences (biology, chemistry, physics). As a result, graduates do not only receive a state-certified technical & vocational academy certificate, but also, a senior high school certificate upon passing their final examination.

== See also ==
- Education in Ghana
- List of schools in Ghana
