= Asunafo District =

- Former District
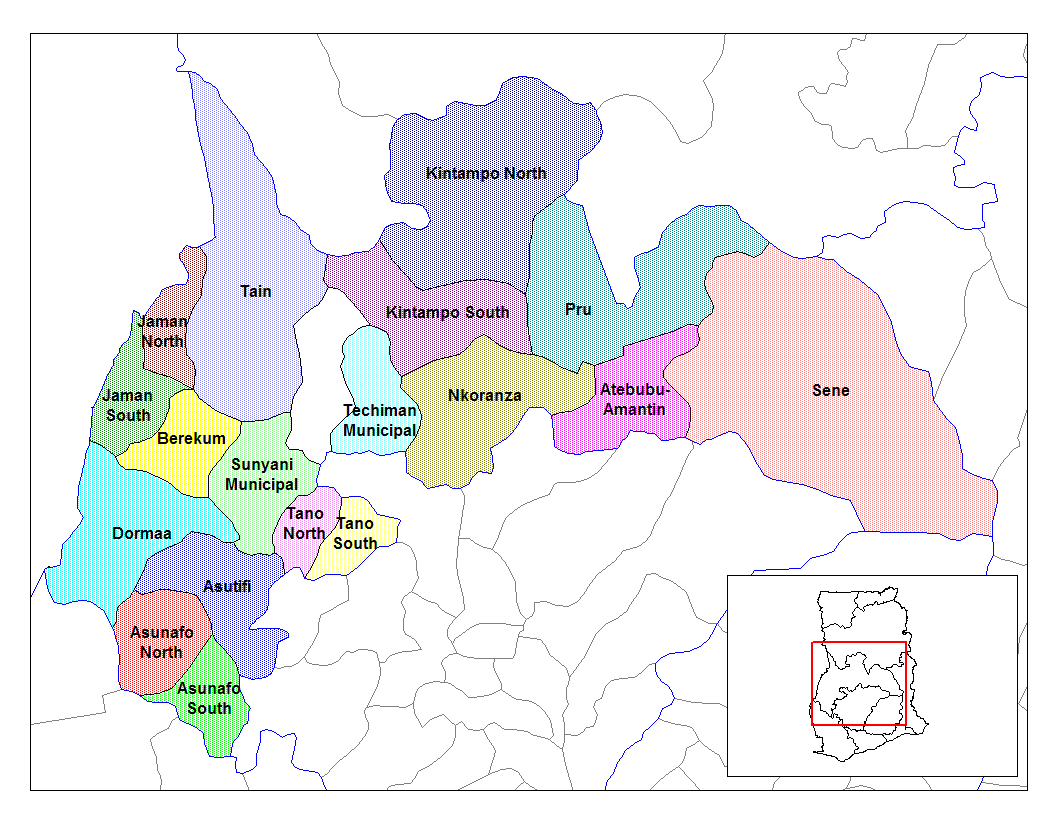
- Districts of Brong-Ahafo Region

- Location of Asunafo District within Brong-Ahafo
- Coordinates: 6°48′N 2°31′W
- Country: Ghana
- Region: Brong-Ahafo
- Capital: Goaso

Area
  - Total: 2,116 km^{2} (817 sq mi)

Population (2012)
  - Total: —
- Time zone: UTC+0 (GMT)

Asunafo District is a former district that was located in Brong-Ahafo Region (now currently in Ahafo Region), Ghana. Originally created as an ordinary district assembly in 1988. However on 12 November 2003 (effectively 17 February 2004), it was split off into two new districts: Asunafo North District (which it was elevated to municipal district assembly status on 29 February 2008; capital: Goaso) and Asunafo South District (capital: Kukuom). The district assembly was located in the southwest part of Brong-Ahafo Region (now western part of Ahafo Region) and had Goaso as its capital town.

== Sources ==
- "Asunafo District". Statoids.
- District: Asunafo District
- 19 New Districts Created , November 20, 2003.
