= MIM =

MIM or Mim may refer to:

== Education ==
- Master of Management, a post-graduate master's degree
- Master of Information Management, an interdisciplinary degree program
- Math in Moscow, a study abroad program

== Fictional characters ==
- Madam Mim, a witch in the novel The Sword in the Stone and film
- Mîm, a dwarf in the legendarium of J.R.R. Tolkien
- Mímir or Mim, a figure in Norse mythology
- Shinji Mimura, a character from Battle Royale, nicknamed "Mim" in the manga adaptation

== Language ==
- Mem, also spelled Mim, the thirteenth letter of many Semitic abjads, including Phoenician, Aramaic, Hebrew and Arabic
- mim, ISO 639 code for Silacayoapan Mixtec, spoken in southern Mexico

== Museums ==
- Berlin Musical Instrument Museum, a museum in Germany
- Mim Museum, a museum in Beirut, Lebanon
- Musical Instrument Museum (Brussels), a museum in Belgium
- Musical Instrument Museum (Phoenix), a museum in Arizona, US

== Organizations ==
- Methodist Inland Mission, a missionary organisation in Australia from 1926 to 1977
- Morality in Media, former name of the National Center on Sexual Exploitation in U.S.
- Mount Isa Mines, an Australian mining company
  - MIM Holdings, its former parent company

== People ==
- Mim (vocalist), stage name of English adult contemporary music vocalist Miriam Grey
- Mim Bidya Sinha Saha, Bangladeshi actress
- Mim Scala (born 1940), theatrical agent
- Mim (model), model of Sølve Sundsbø

== Places ==
- Mim, Ahafo, Ghana
- Mim Bour, or Mim Mountains, Ghana
- Mim Lake, Ghana

== Political parties ==
- All India Majlis-e-Ittehadul Muslimeen, a Muslim political party in India
- Maoist Internationalist Movement, a former communist group based primarily in the U.S.
- Martinican Independence Movement, a political party in Martinique
- Muslim Independence Movement, later Mindanao Independence Movement, a short-lasting movement in the Philippines

== Science and technology ==
- Mechanically interlocked molecules, a class of topologically constrained molecules
- Mendelian Inheritance in Man, a database that catalogues all the known diseases with a genetic component
- Metal injection molding, a manufacturing process
- Metal-insulator-metal, a type of diode
- Microsoft Identity Manager, version of Microsoft Identity Integration Server
- .MIM (.mim), file extension, or .MIME or .mime identifying a MIME-encoded file
- Mobile Interceptor Missile such as MIM-3 Nike Ajax
- Molecular Interaction Maps, a graphic formalism to depict cellular and molecular interactions

== Transport ==
- MIM, IATA airport code for Merimbula Airport, Australia
- MIM, National Rail code for Moreton-in-Marsh railway station, UK

== See also ==
- Mime (disambiguation)
