= Mim Bour =

Mountains in Ghana

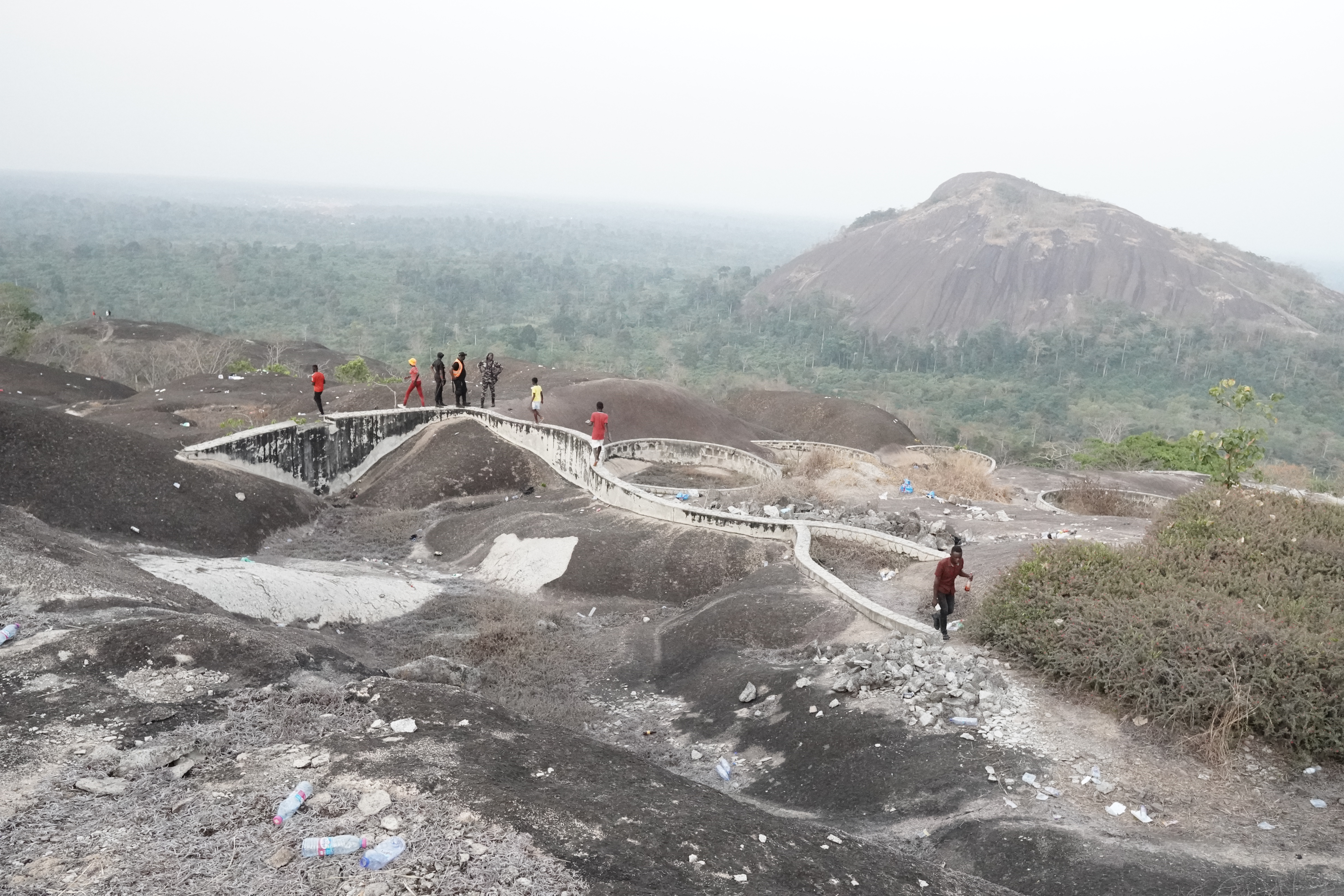
- shot from the female mountain

Highest point
- Elevation: 410 m (1,350 ft)
- Coordinates: 6.9199°N 2.6211°W

Geography
- Location within Ghana
- Location: Mim, Ahafo, Ghana

Mim Bour or Mim Rocky-Mountains are located 5 kilometres (3.1 mi) to the west of Mim in Asunafo North Municipal District of Ahafo region, Ghana.

== Geography ==
Mim Bour consists of a group of three peaks rising from otherwise undulating countryside.The mountains are located about 390 kilometres (240 mi) northwest of Accra and 140 kilometres (87 mi) west of Kumasi. The area around the mountains has been partially developed into a tourist site.

The site is served by an airstrip located east of the mountains.

According to oral tradition, the tallest of the Mim Bour mountains is the father while the other two are mother and child.

== The male mountain ==
The male mountain, at 6.919916°N 2.621084°W, is very steep in nature, and rises to a little over 400 metres (1,300 ft). According to oral tradition, only the first chief of Mim has been able to climb to the summit, and he achieved this by some supernatural powers. Historical account states that, the Paramount Chief used to climb this steep mountain whenever he wanted to address his subjects or spy on enemy incursions. It is said that at the summit, he was able to see all the areas under his traditional authority and even as far as Sunyani, Dormaa Ahenkro, Techiman, and Kumasi.

== The female mountain ==
The female mountain, at 6.9131°N 2.6286°W, is the biggest of the three mountains by Area.It measures about one km^{2} (0.39 sq mi) and rises to about 360 metres (1,180 ft). There is a staircase running to the summit of this mountain.

At the summit, there is a reception centre, swimming pool, gardens, and orchard. The top of the mountain gives panoramic views of the nearby airstrip, cashew plantation, and surrounding forests.

Tourists who visit Mim Bour also often visit Mim Lake, an artificial lake which is about one km (0.62 mi) away from the Mim Senior High School. There is one hotel and guesthouses in Mim which accommodate tourists.

== Gallery ==
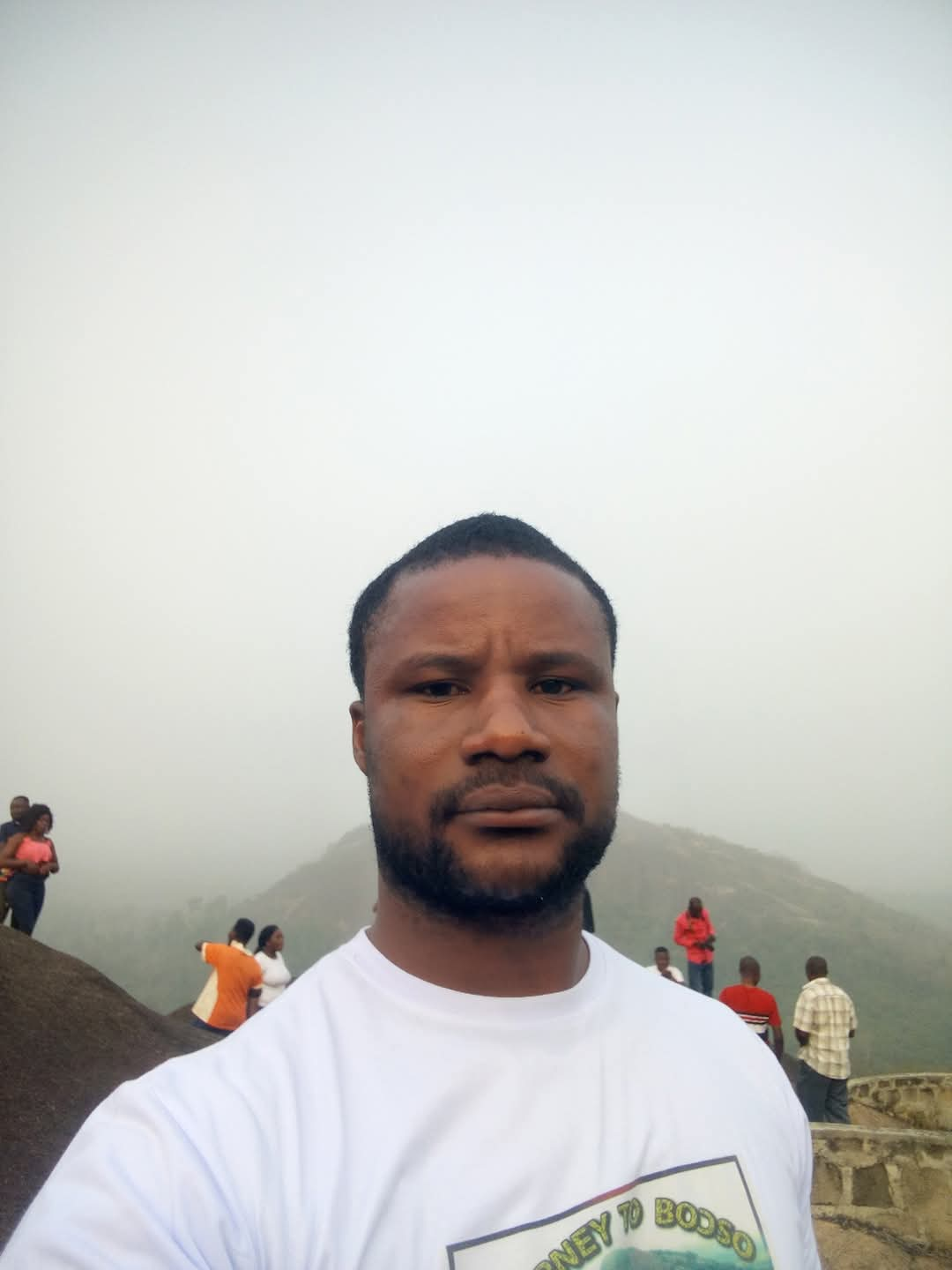
Hon Boadu @ Mim Bour

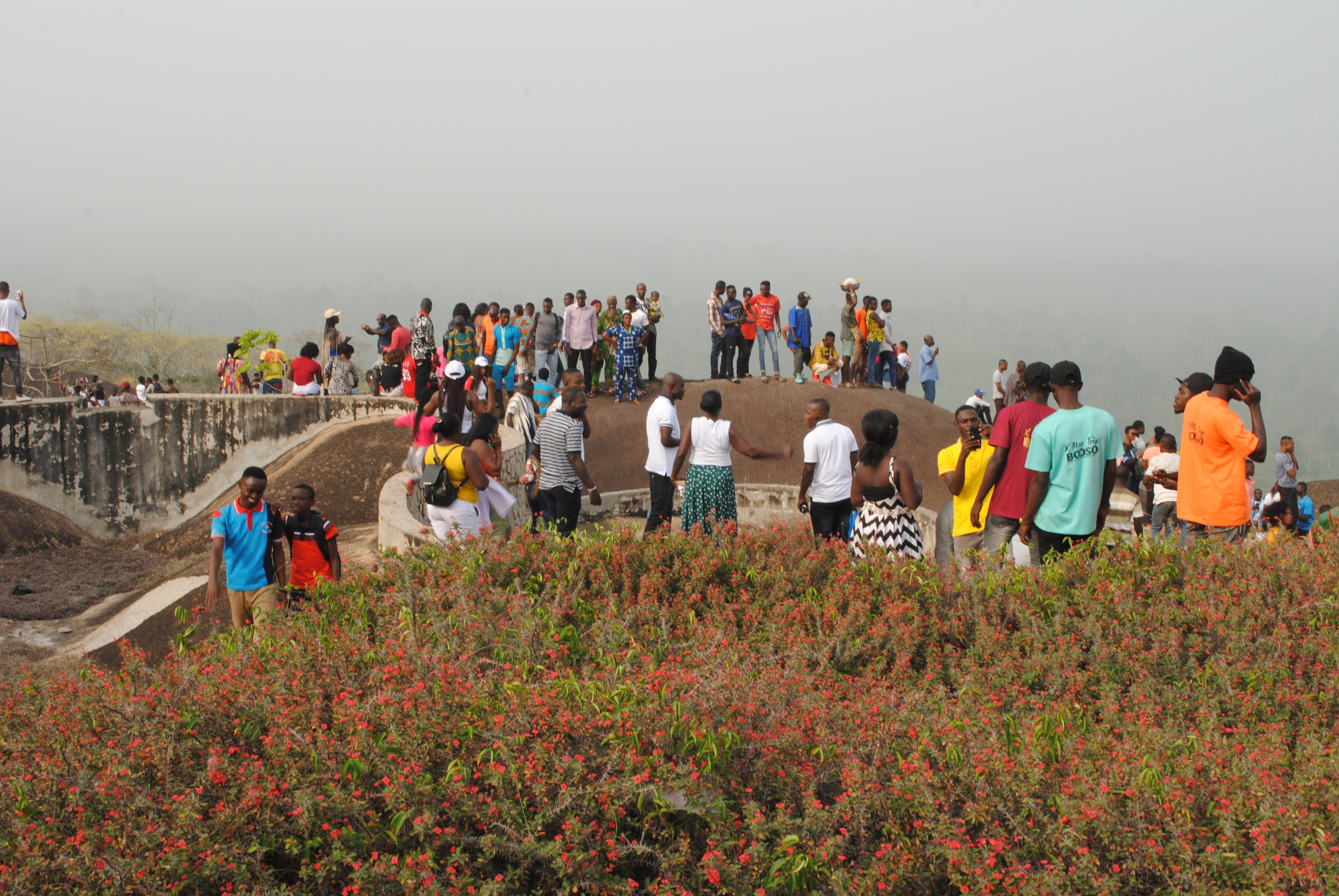
tourists at Mim Bour

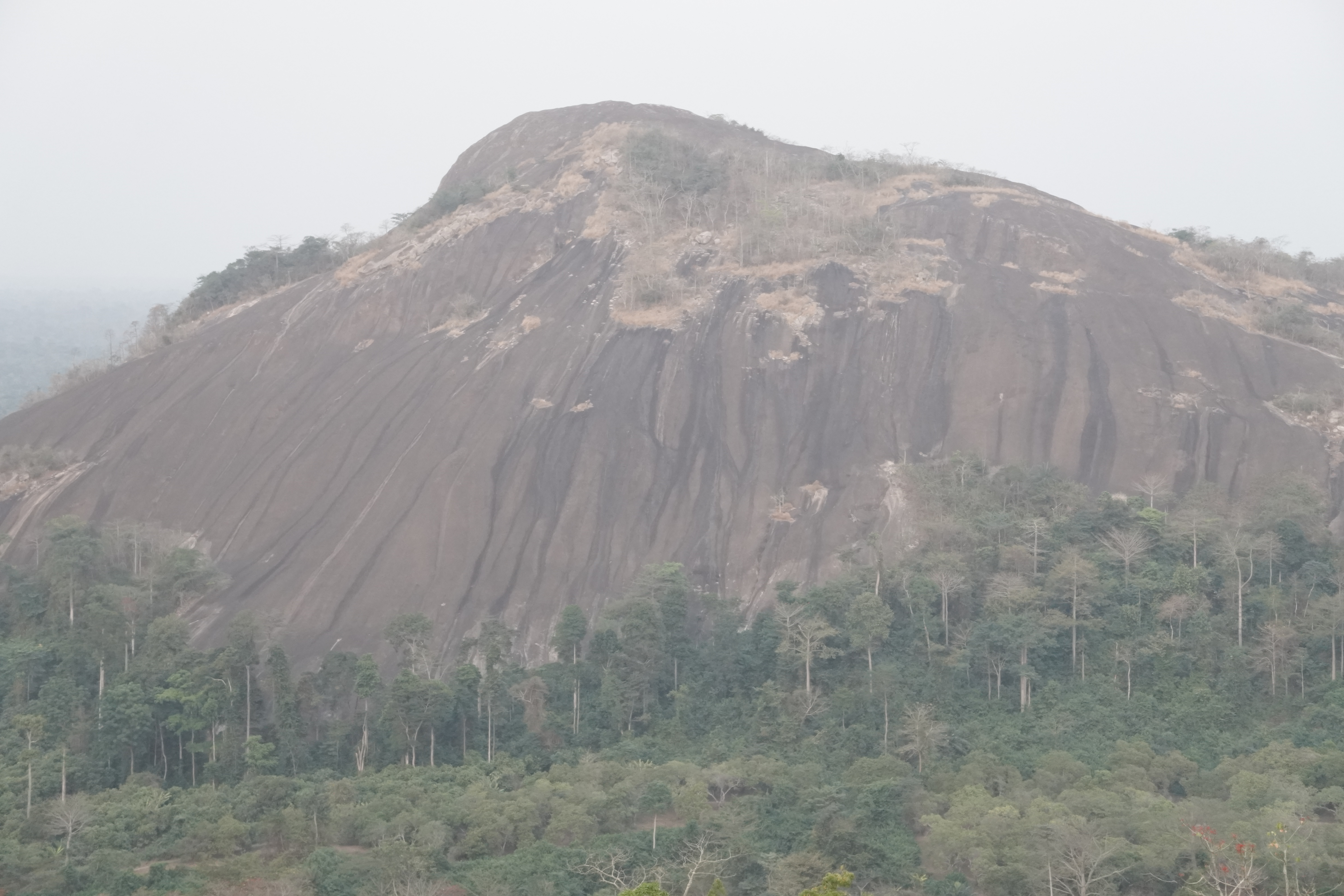
Male mountain

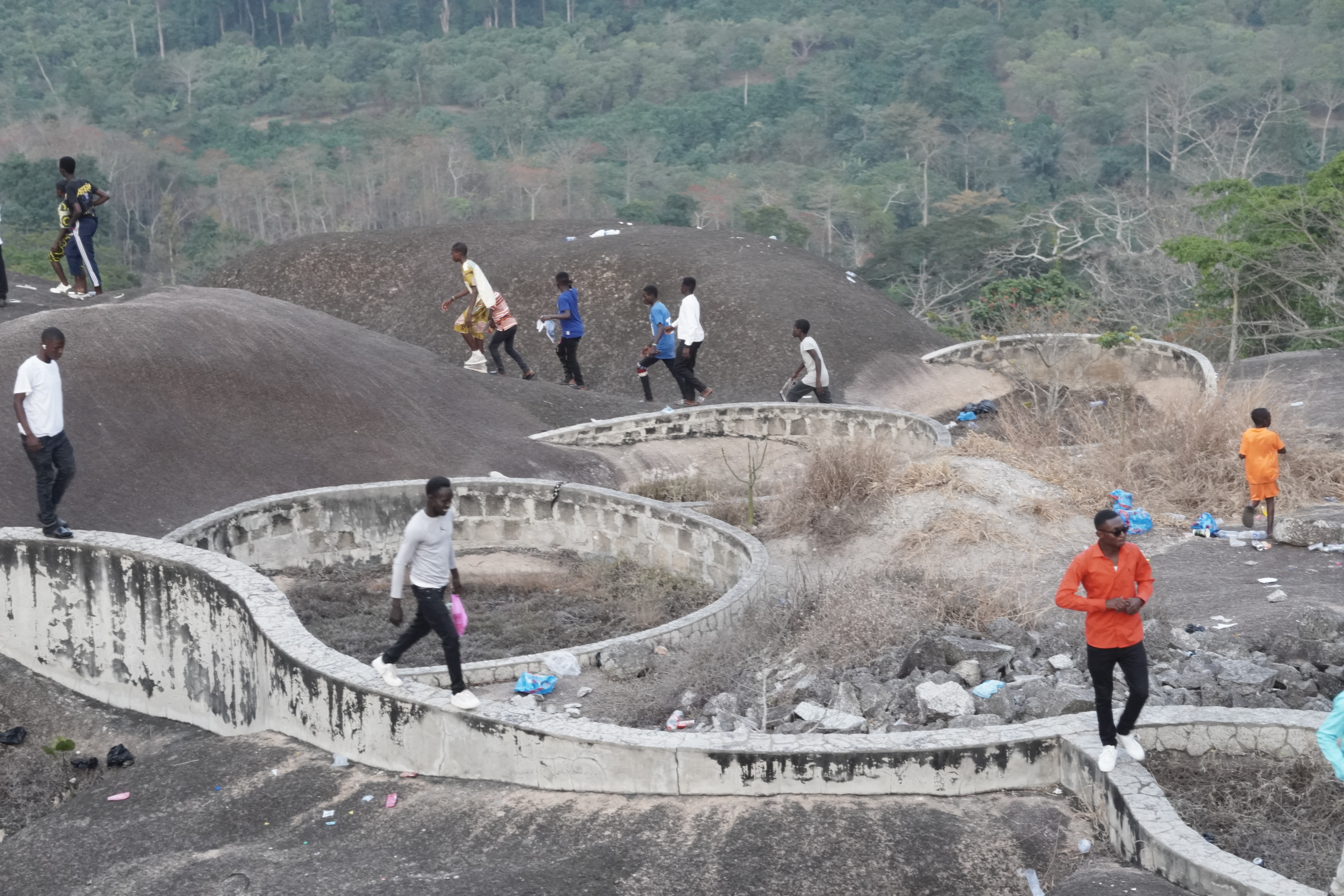
female mountain top scenery

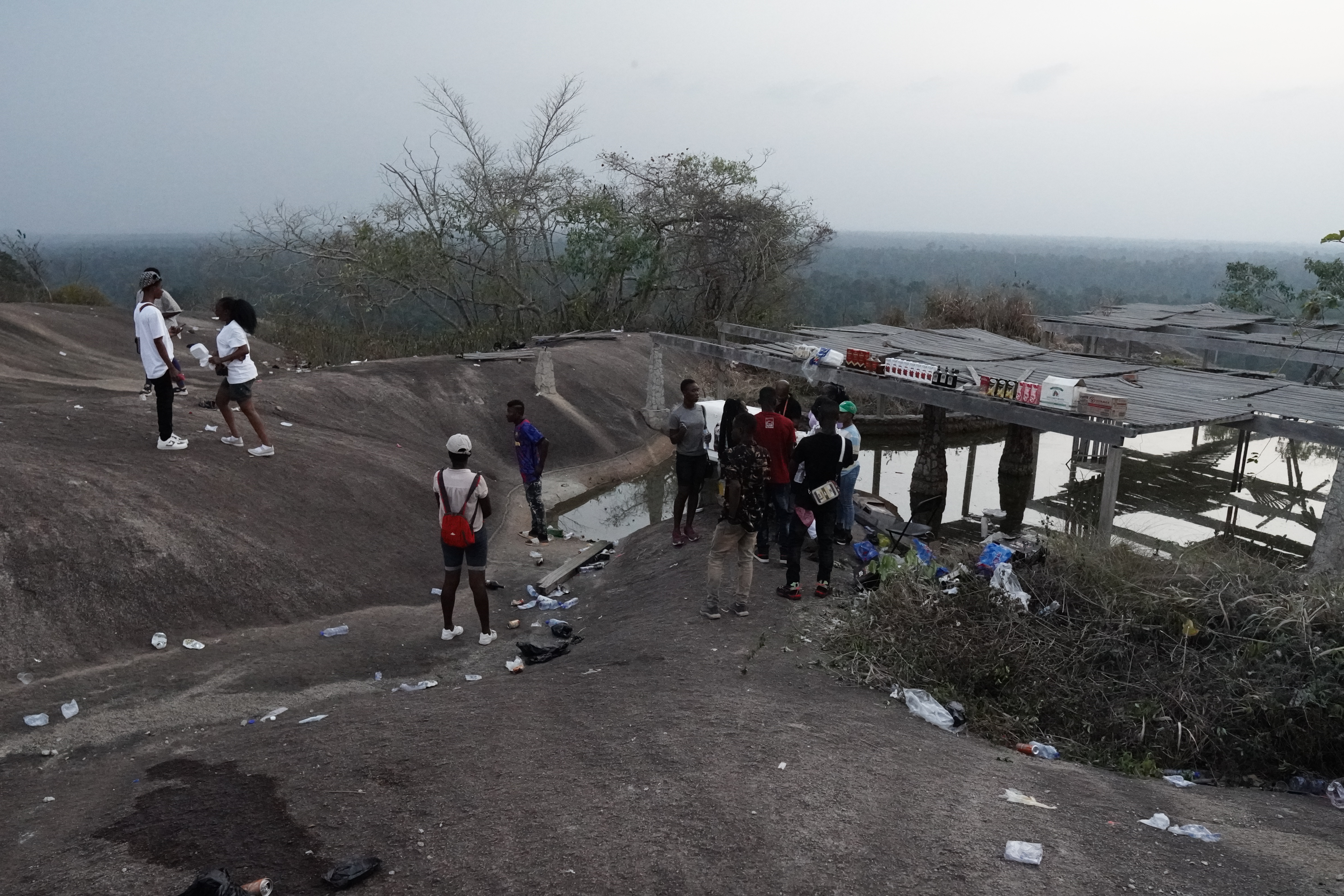
Mountain Pool

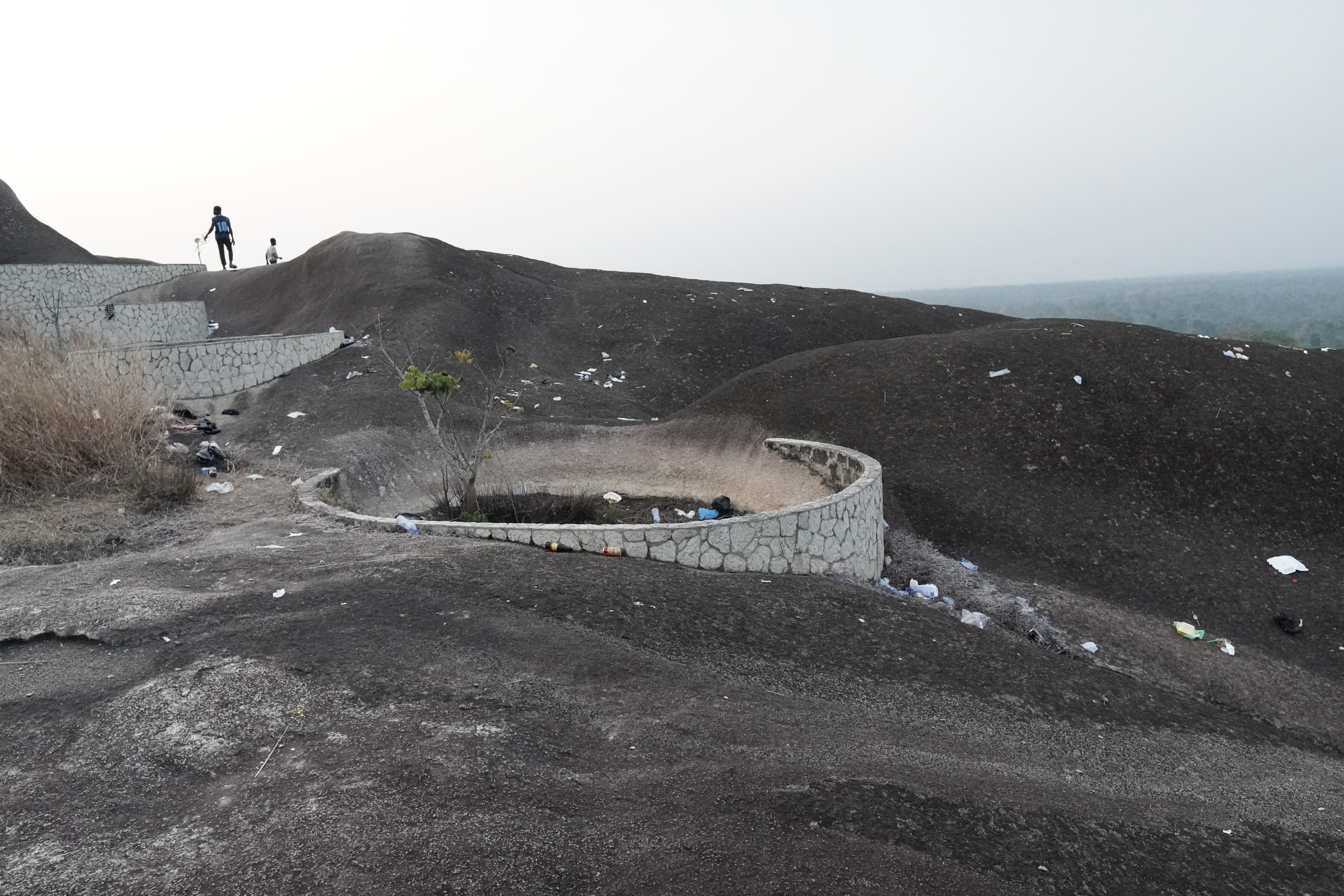
Mim Bour peak

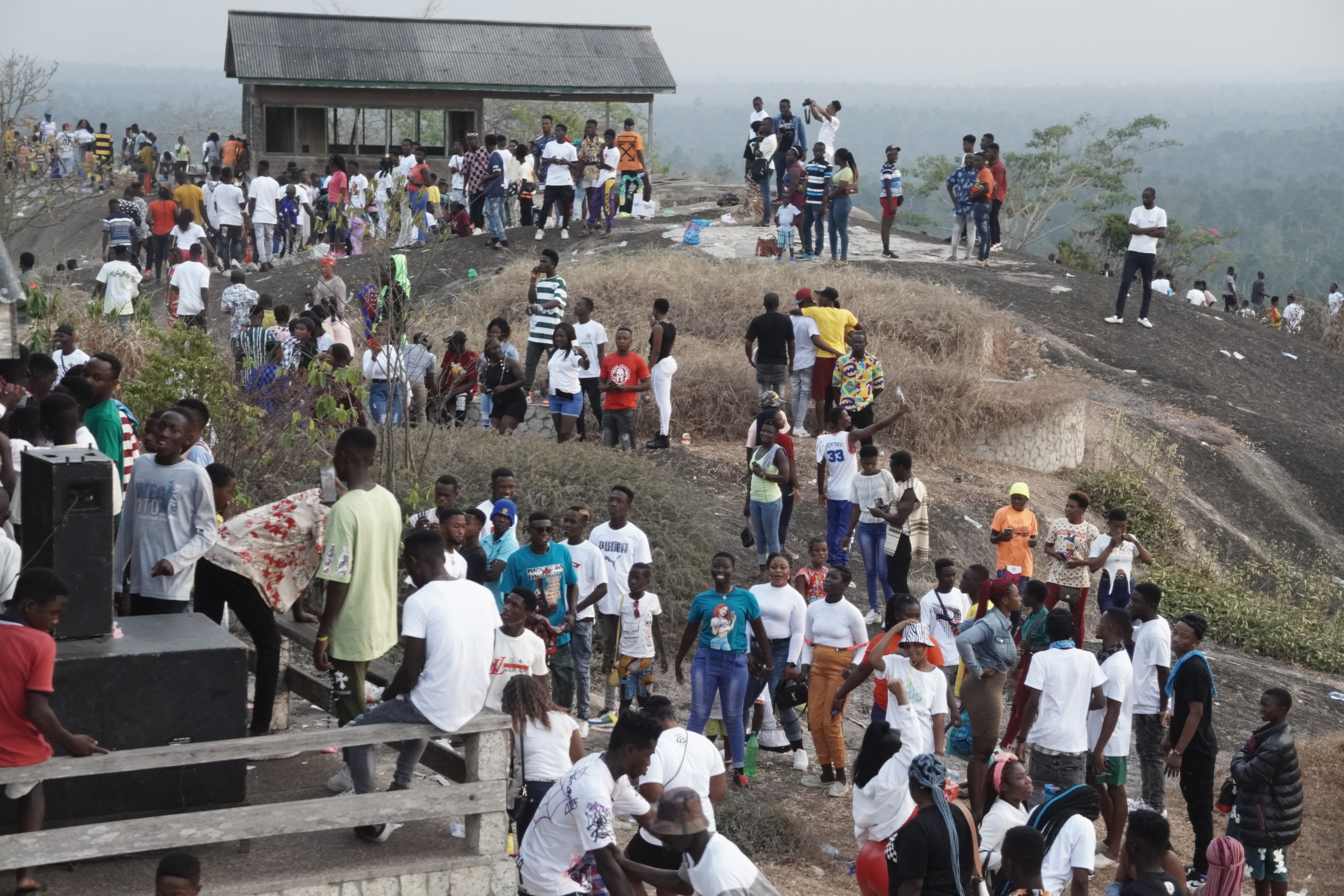
Bar on de mountain

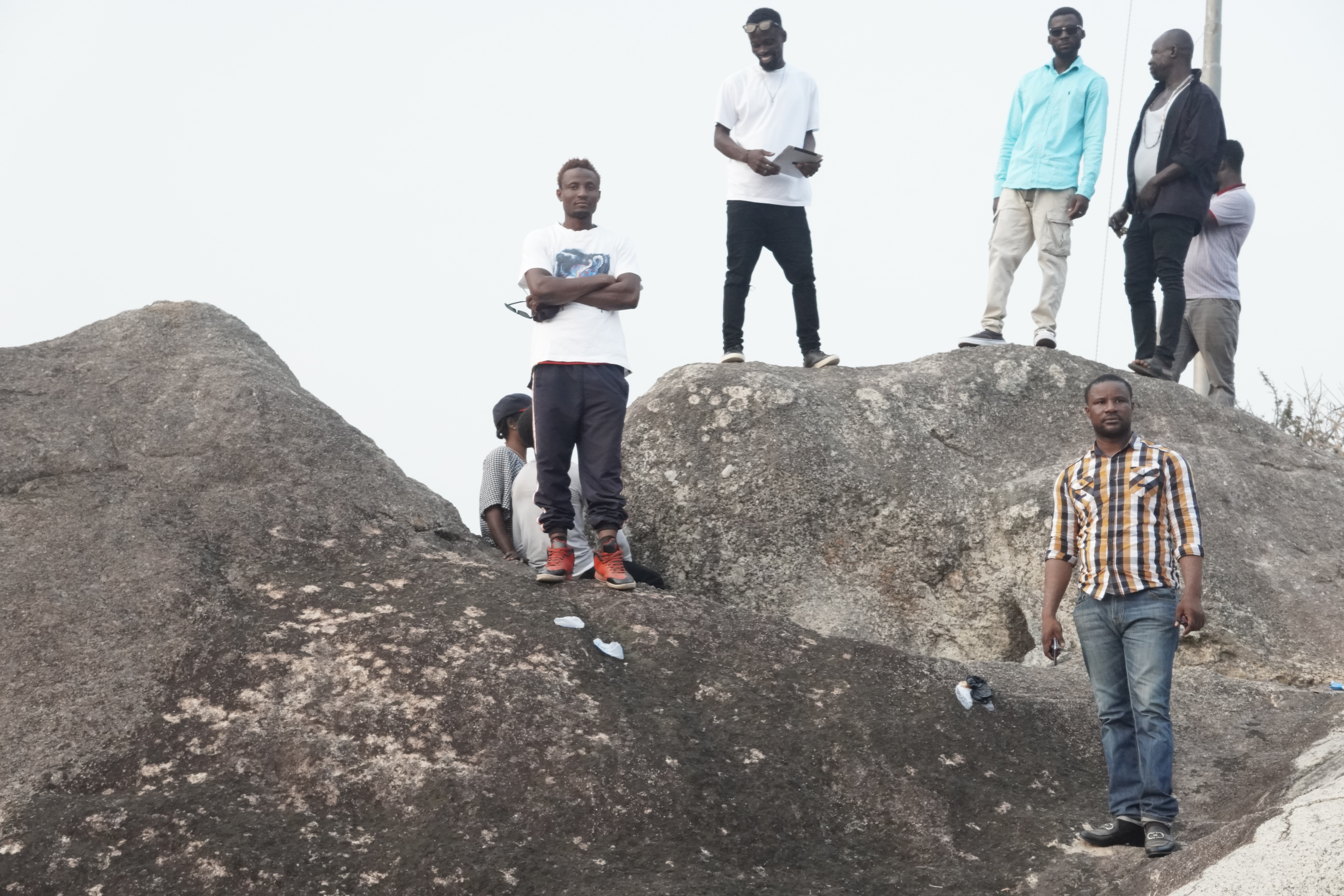
Hon. Boadu @ Mim Bour

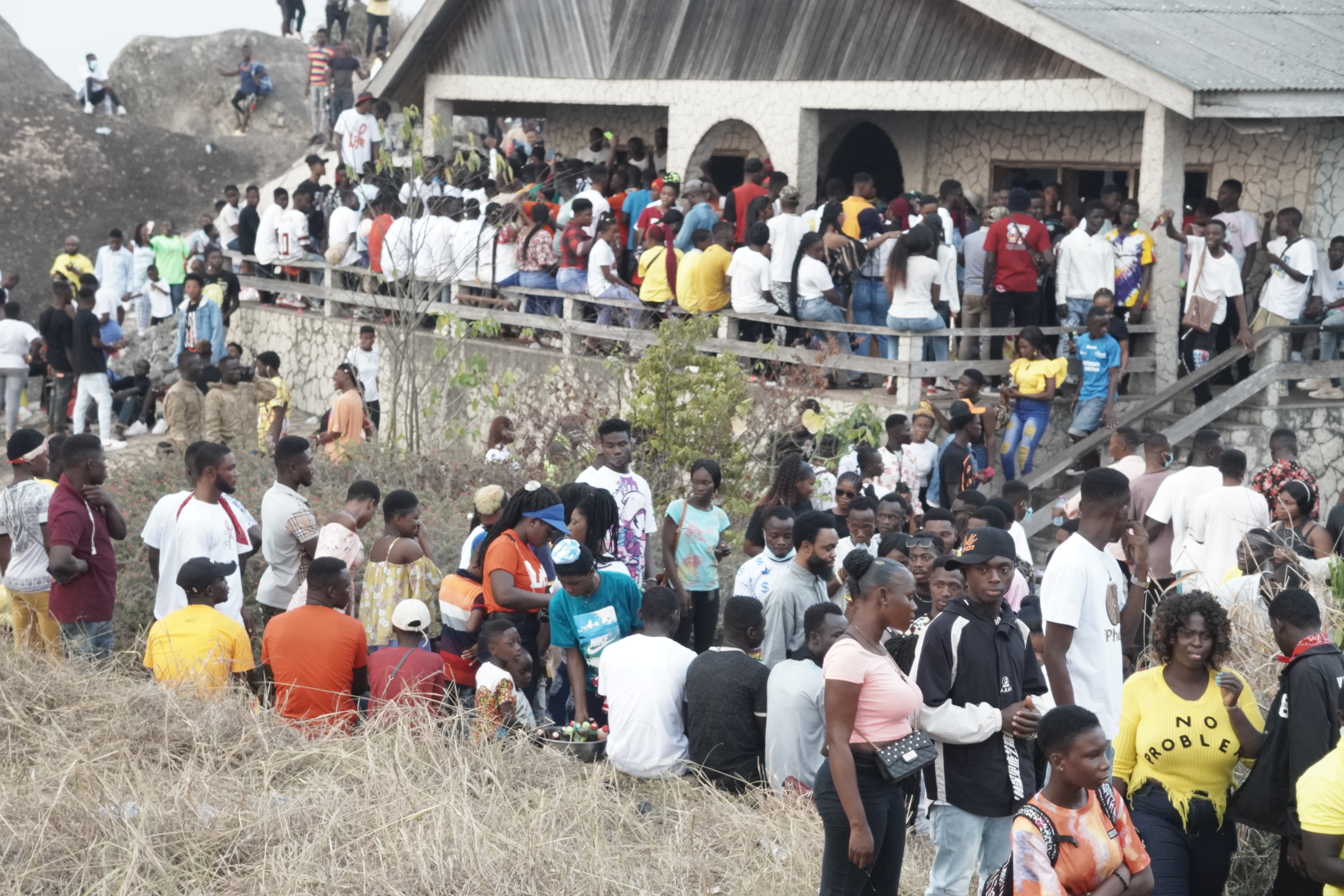
Revellers @ Mim Bour

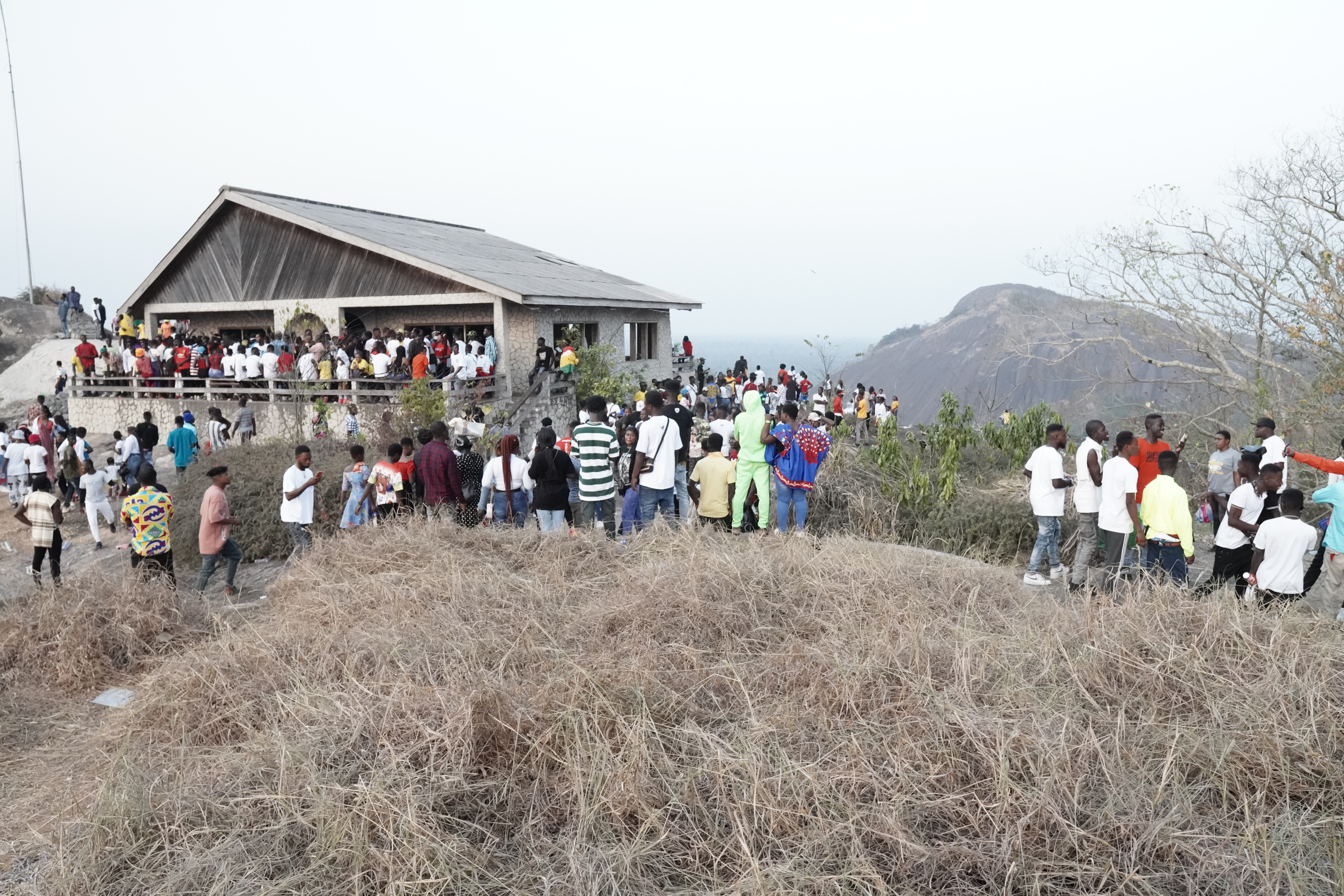
male mountain behind

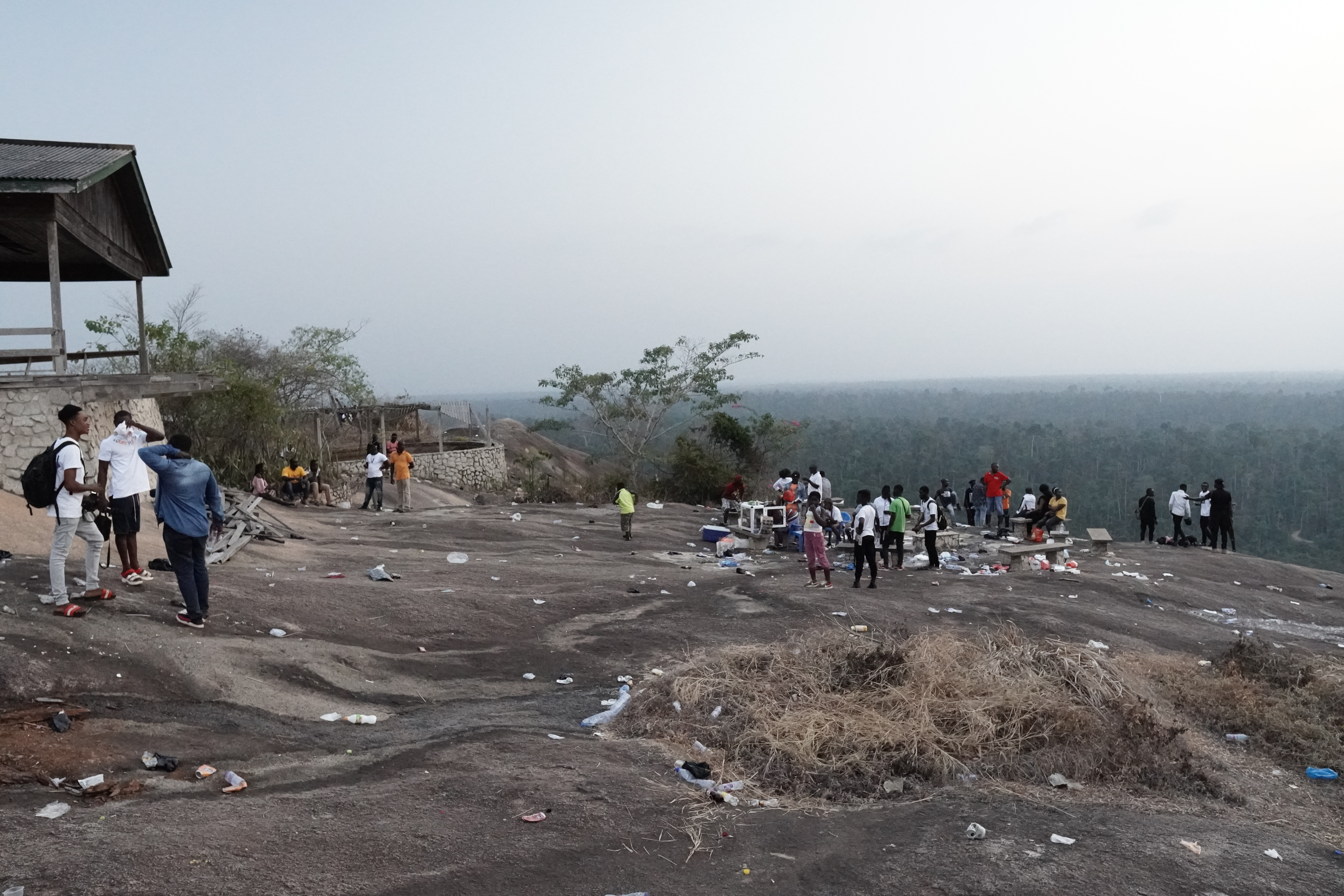
round seating on the mountain

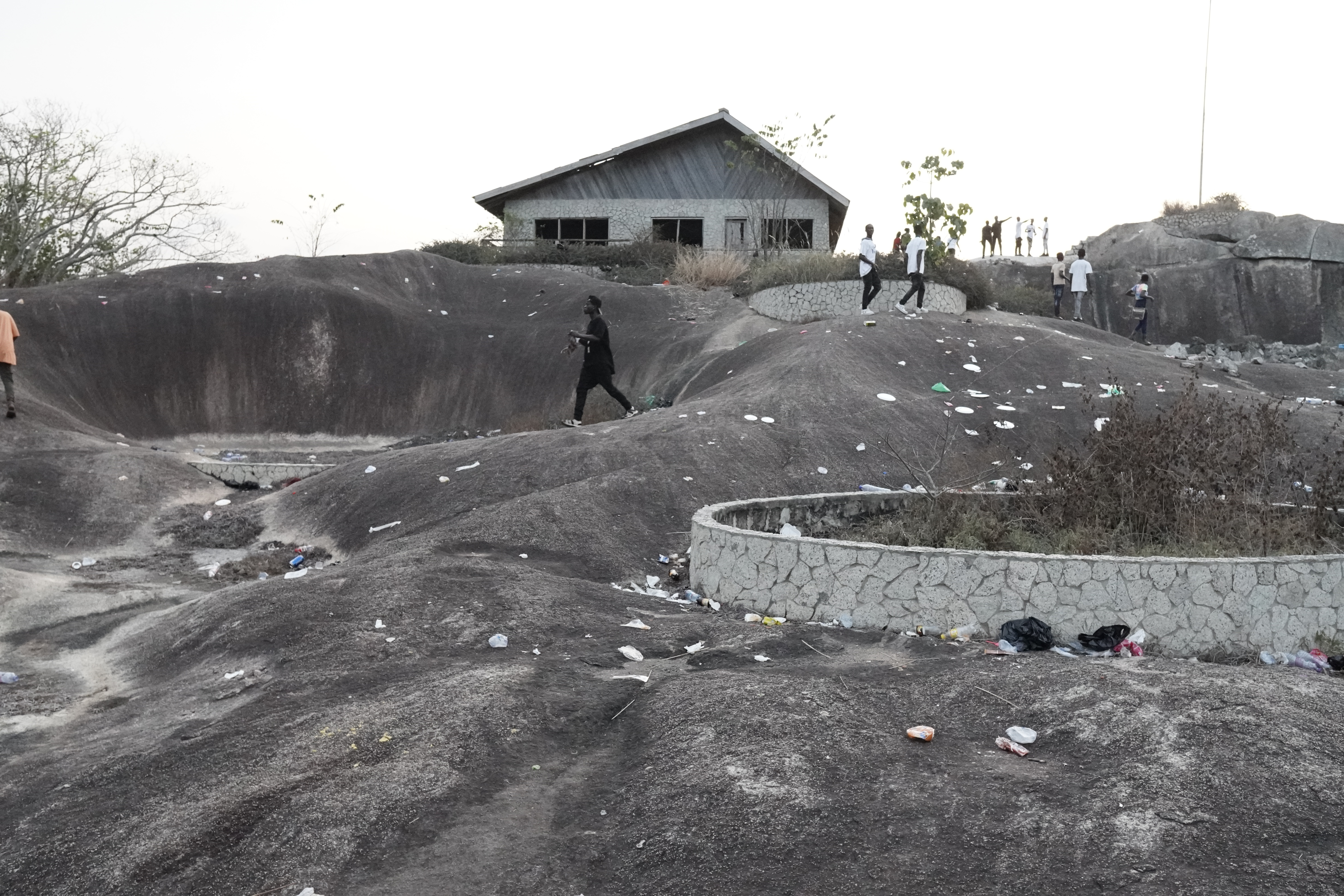
Mim Bour scenery

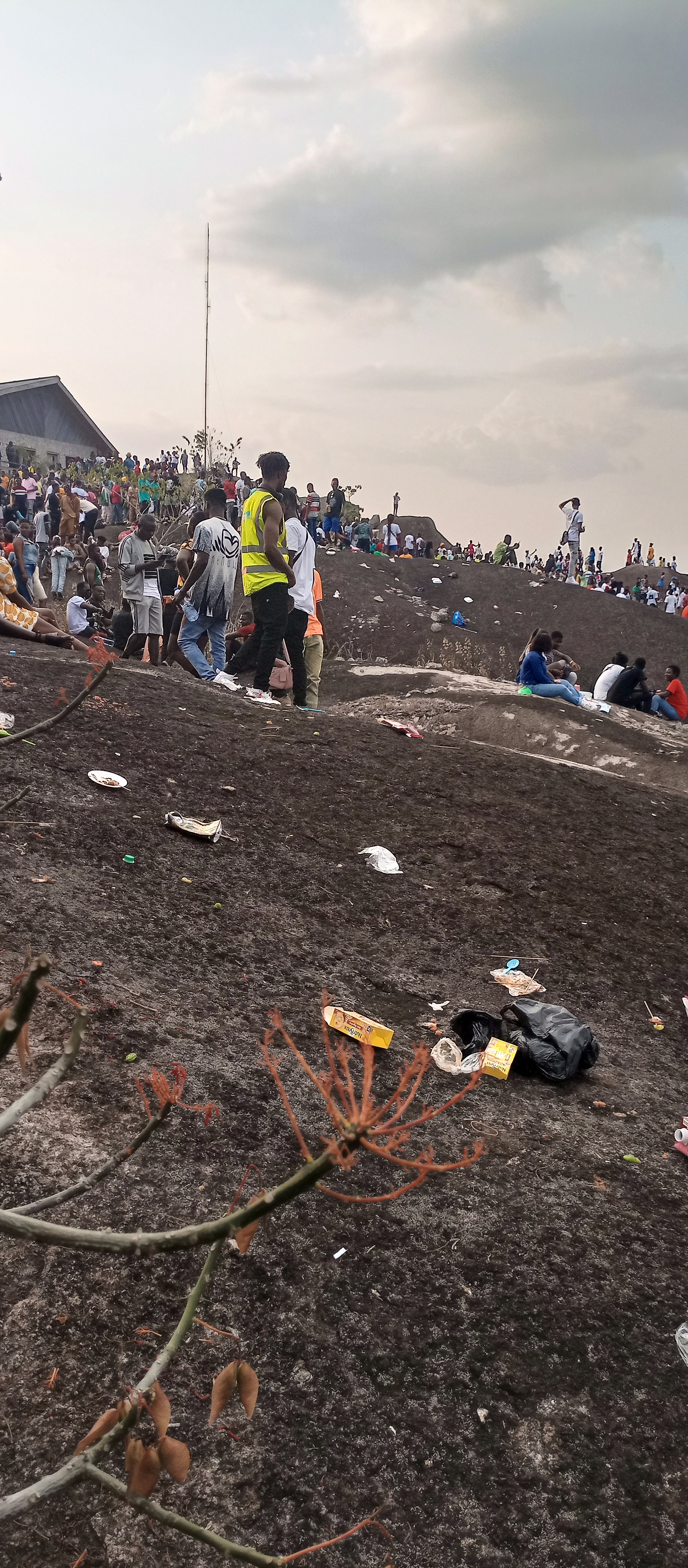
Side view

== Transport ==
Mim is a regional centre, with direct routes to places such as Kumasi, Sunyani, Kenyasi, Goaso, Nkrankwanta, Dormaa Ahenkro, and Sefwi Debiso.

== Legends ==
Mim Bour is believed by the people of Mim to have some spiritual history surrounding their existence. The chiefs and people of Mim believe that the mountains serve as protective gods to them and surrounding towns. During occasions such as the annual festival, the chiefs and people of Mim visit the Mim Bour to offer libation.
