= Mim Senior High School =

Location
- P. O. Box 29, Mim, Ahafo; Ghana
- 6.9063°N 2.5523°W

Information
- Type: Coeducational public high school
- Patron saint: Okofrobour Nana Dr. Yaw Agyei II
- Founded: 1969 (57 years ago)
- Status: Active
- School district: Asunafo North Municipal District
- Oversight: Ministry of Education
- Head of school: James Tweneboah Koduah
- Gender: Co-educational
- Age: 14 to 19
- Classes offered: Home economics, General science, general arts, business, visual art, General Agriculture
- Colours: Blue and White
- Slogan: Abenfo
- Song: Great Students of MISEC
- Nickname: MISEC
- Test average: 70%
- Alumni: MISOSA

Mim Senior High School popularly known as Misec is a secondary educational institution in Ghana and operates as a co-educational, non-denominational, day and boarding located in Mim in the Asunafo North Municipal District in the Ahafo Region of Ghana. Its motto is 'Let Your Light Shine'.

The school runs courses in Business, Science, general arts, general agric, Home Economics and visual arts, leading to the award of a West African Senior School Certificate (WASSCE). Mim Senior High School is a category B school.

== History ==
The school was established in 1969 at Mim on the Sunyani road, in the Ahafo Region of Ghana. It started with a population of 70 students as a mixed school. The school has been operating for over 57 years since its establishment in1969.

== Headmaster ==
The first headmaster for Mim Senior High School was called Mr. Thomas Baidoo.

== Notable alumni ==
- Collins Dauda, politician
- Seiba Issifu, Educator

== See also ==
- Education in Ghana
- List of schools in Ghana
