= Yamfo =

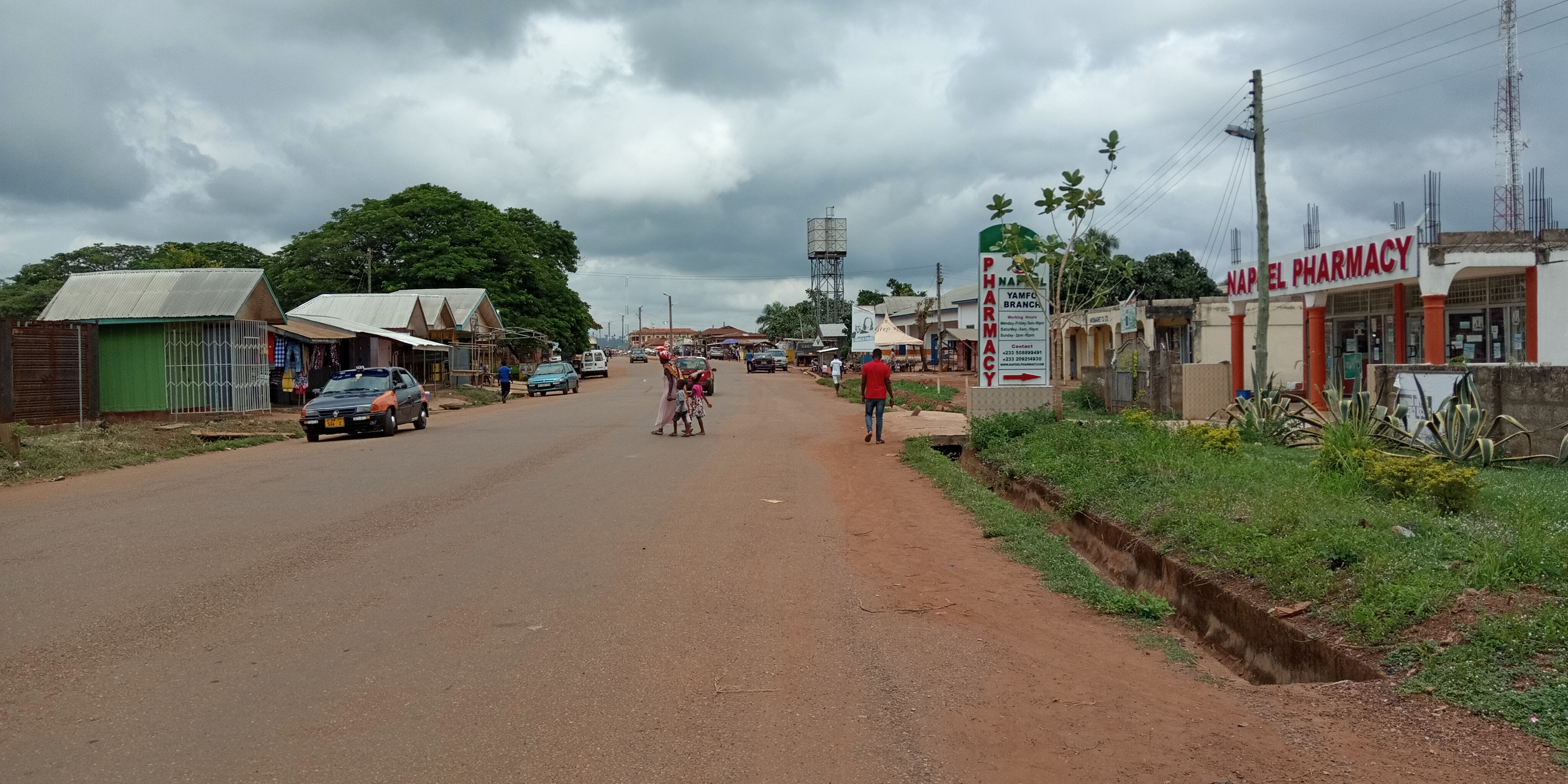
- Entering town from the north on the road from Sunyani, Tanoso and Susuanso.

- Location of Wamahinso in Ghana
- Coordinates: 7°13′N 2°13′W
- Country: Ghana
- Region: Ahafo Region

Yamfo is a town in the Tano North District in the Ahafo Region of Ghana. The town is known for the Yamfo Anglican Commercial School. The Anglican Commercial School is a second cycle institution. Also for the Yamfo College of Health which is affiliated with the University of Cape Coast.

== Gallery ==
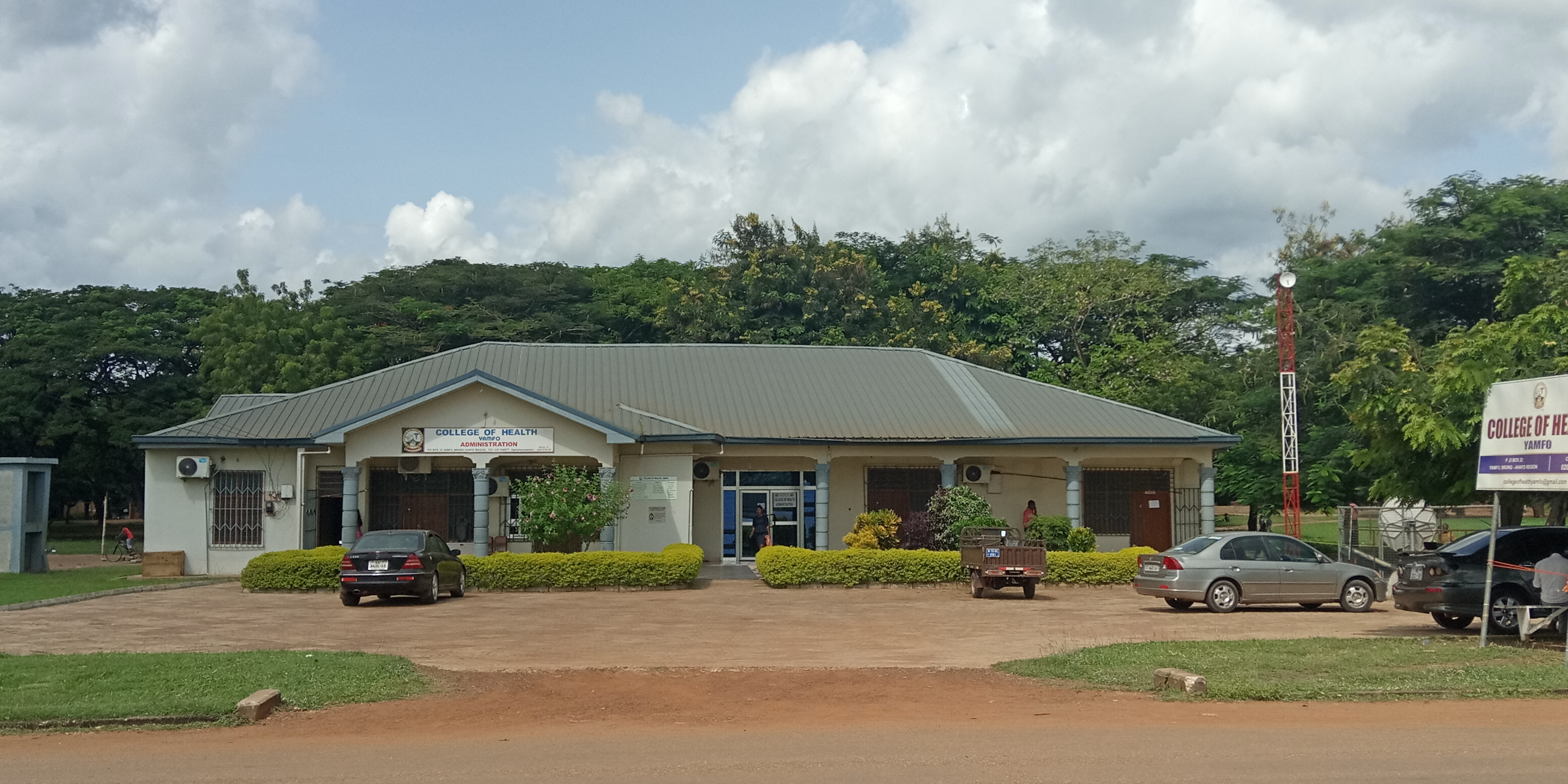
Administration building of the Yamfo College Of Health.
