= Mime (disambiguation) =

A mime or mime artist is a person who uses a theatrical medium or performance art involving the acting out of a story through body motions without use of speech called miming.

Mime or miming may also refer to:

== Arts and entertainment ==
=== Performance ===
- An alternative word for lip sync
- Mime, a style of Dorian Greek poetry also called mime-iambic; see Sophron
- Miming in instrumental performance

=== Fictional characters ===
- Mime, a character in Richard Wagner's Der Ring des Nibelungen corresponding to Regin in Old Norse texts
- Mime, a fictional character in the cartoon series Happy Tree Friends
- Mime (comics), a fictional villain from DC Comics
- Mr. Mime and Mime Jr., species of Pokémon

== Other uses ==
- MIME, Multipurpose Internet Mail Extensions
  - S/MIME
  - 8BITMIME
  - MIME type, the original application of media type, a computer feature for the identification of file formats on the internet
- Mime Glacier, a small glacier in Antarctica
- Mimecast (Nasdaq: MIME)
- A unit of imitation in the theory of symbiosism

== See also ==
- Meme (disambiguation)
- Mim (disambiguation)
- Mime Gopi, Indian mime and actor
- Mime Madhu, Indian mime and actor
- Mímir or Mim is a figure in Norse mythology
- Mimo (disambiguation)
- Mine (disambiguation)
- MyM, a U.K. magazine
- Mymensingh, Bangladesh
