= Mim, Ahafo =

City in Ahafo region, Ghana

Mim
- Town
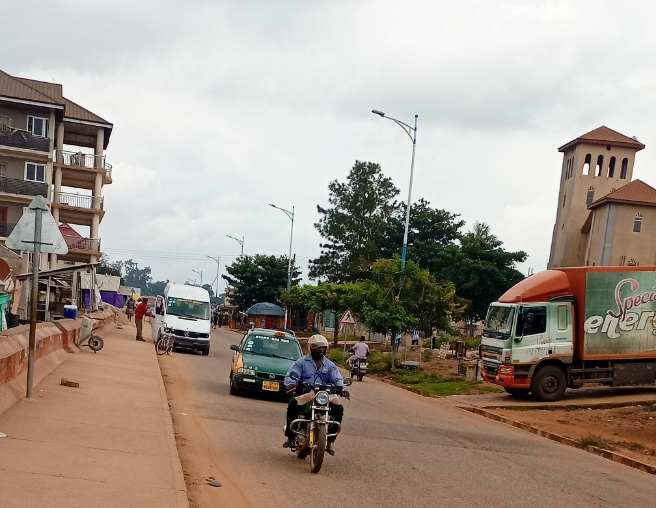
- Mim High Street from Goaso Direction
- Nickname: Industrial town of Ahafo Region
- Location within Ghana
- Coordinates: 6°54′22″N 2°33′47″W
- Country: Ghana
- Region: Ahafo Region
- District: Asunafo North Municipal District
- Sub-District: Mim Urban Council
- Time zone: GMT
  - Summer (DST): GMT

Mim is a city in the Asunafo North Municipal District in the Ahafo Region of Ghana. It is a nodal town between Sunyani and Goaso on the N12 Highway. The distance from Mim to Sunyani is 64 km whiles that of Mim to Goaso is 14 km. Mim has direct routes to: Kumasi; Kenyasi;Dormaa Ahenkro; Sunyani; Nkrankwanta and Sefwi Debiso.

Mim is the seat of the Mim traditional Area with other big towns such as Kasapin, Kwadwo Addaikrom, Bediako, Gambia No.1 & No.2, Dominase, Gyasikrom all under the Mim paramountcy.

Mim is known for producing timber, cocoa and cashew.

According to the 2021 population census, Mim township has a population of 31,538. This makes Mim the largest town in Ahafo Region and that of Asunafo North Municipal District.

== History & People ==
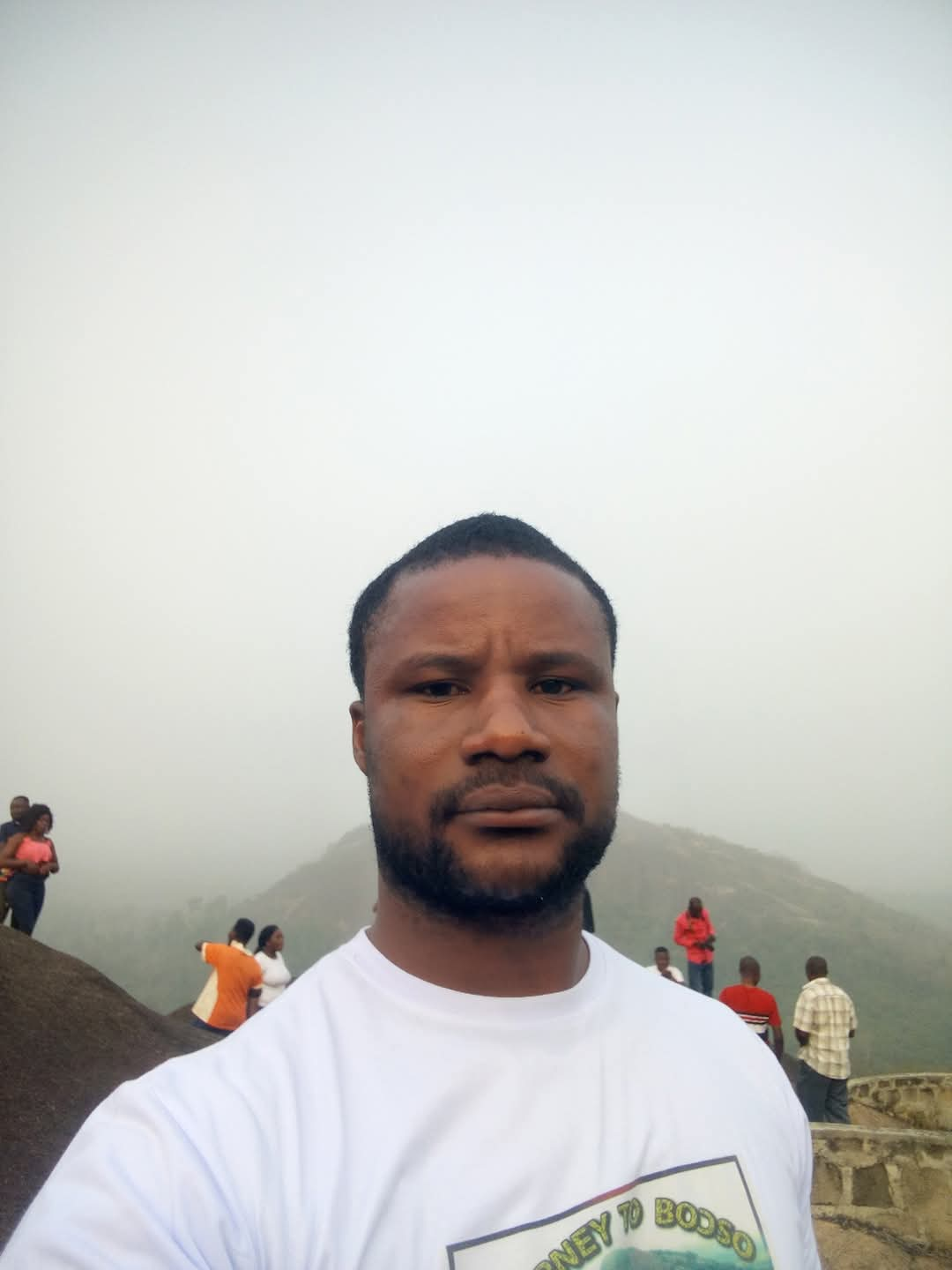
Hon Boadu @ Mim Bour

Mim, Ahafo is part of Asante. "Mim" is a Twi term for palm trees. Ahafo is a Twi term for hunters.

The land which Ahafo people occupy today, originally belonged to the Aowin people whose Chief was Abirimoro Akwojan.

Sometime in the eighteenth century, Asantehene Osei TuTu I was shot and killed by the people of Akyem while he was crossing River Pra on a canoe.

Asantehene Opoku Ware I who succeeded Osei TuTu I decided to avenge the death of his predecessor. Whiles Asantehene Opoku Ware I was at war front in Akyem, terrible news of Abirimoro's invasion of Kumasi reached him at the battlefield in Akyem.

Opoku Ware I dispatched Akyempimhene Owusu Afriyie and Bantamahene Amankwaa Tia to pursue Abirimoro and his invaders. The Akyempimhene accepted the request but he deputed his younger brother Hiahene Sabin, Nyanahinhene, Nkwaie-paninhene and Buaso Odikro to pursue Abirimoro and his warriors.

Bantamahene Amankwaa Tia also dispatched some chiefs and Brefo Apau also joined the chiefs with his own warriors to pursue Abirimoro and his warriors who had run away with a sister of the Asantehene and other precious properties they had looted.

The warriors chased Abirimoro and his forces from Ahafo lands and pursued them across the Tano and Bia Rivers to as far as the bank of River Manza in what is now La Côte d'Ivoire. The Abirimoro war lasted three years.

Asantehene Opoku Ware I presented the newly conquered territory (Ahafo lands) to the chiefs as a gift. Each of the chiefs was asked to take care of or control the area he had conquered.

Brefo Apau and his warriors were after the victory gifted Mim, Goaso, Hwidiem, Achrensua, Kenyasi, Ayomso lands. Brefo Apau was giving a stool as Akwaboahene by the Asantehene. The Twi term Akwaboahene means "having gone to help the chiefs in the war".

The Brefo Apau and his warriors established their outpost in a section of the forest to spy on enemy incursions. Their outpost was in a place which was full of palm trees. They used the branches of the palm trees for shelter and referred to the area as Mem or Mim which is a Twi term for palm trees.

Mim was the first town established by the warriors and it became the capital of the Akwaboah stool land with Goaso, Kenyasi, Achrensua, Hwidiem lands placed under the control of Mim Chief.

Nana Appiah Kusi Brempong became the first Paramount Chief of Mim. He is still remembered for his visionary leadership of the Mim traditional Area.

== Festival ==
The people of Mim celebrate the Akwansramu festival and this ceremony is usually held in December.

Akwansramu is a Twi term for espionage. The Akwansramu festival is celebrated to commemorate the Asante-warriors patrol of the Mim-Akwaboa lands averting enemy's incursion on Kumasi.

Akwansramu is one of Ghana's many festivals that see attendance from people from all walks of life including the diaspora.

The Akwansramu is a staple of Ghana's diverse cultural expression, bringing together people from all walks of life to celebrate themes of victory, harvest and gratitude in unity.

== Economy ==
Mim is commonly described as an averagely sized center for farming, trading and industrial activities.

Agriculture:

The fundamental occupation of residents of Mim is farming, which is cultivation of cash crops and food crops. The predominant cash crops grown in this area are cocoa and cashew. Mim and its surrounding towns such as: Goaso, Bediako, Gambia No2, Kasapin & Kwadwo Addaikrom produce about a quarter of the foodstuffs that are sent to Accra and Tema.

Industry:

The tropical forest reserves in this area serve as source of raw materials for the numerous timber companies in Mim. The Ayum Forest Products Limited formerly Mim Timbers, Mim Scanstyle Company Limited, Ocean-wood company limited, Supremo Wood processing co. Ltd amongst tens of timber firms located in Mim exist because of the abundance of timber in this area. However, the recent illegal chainsaw operations are fast depleting the forest reserves and are threatening the existence of these timber companies which provide hundreds of employment to the teeming population.

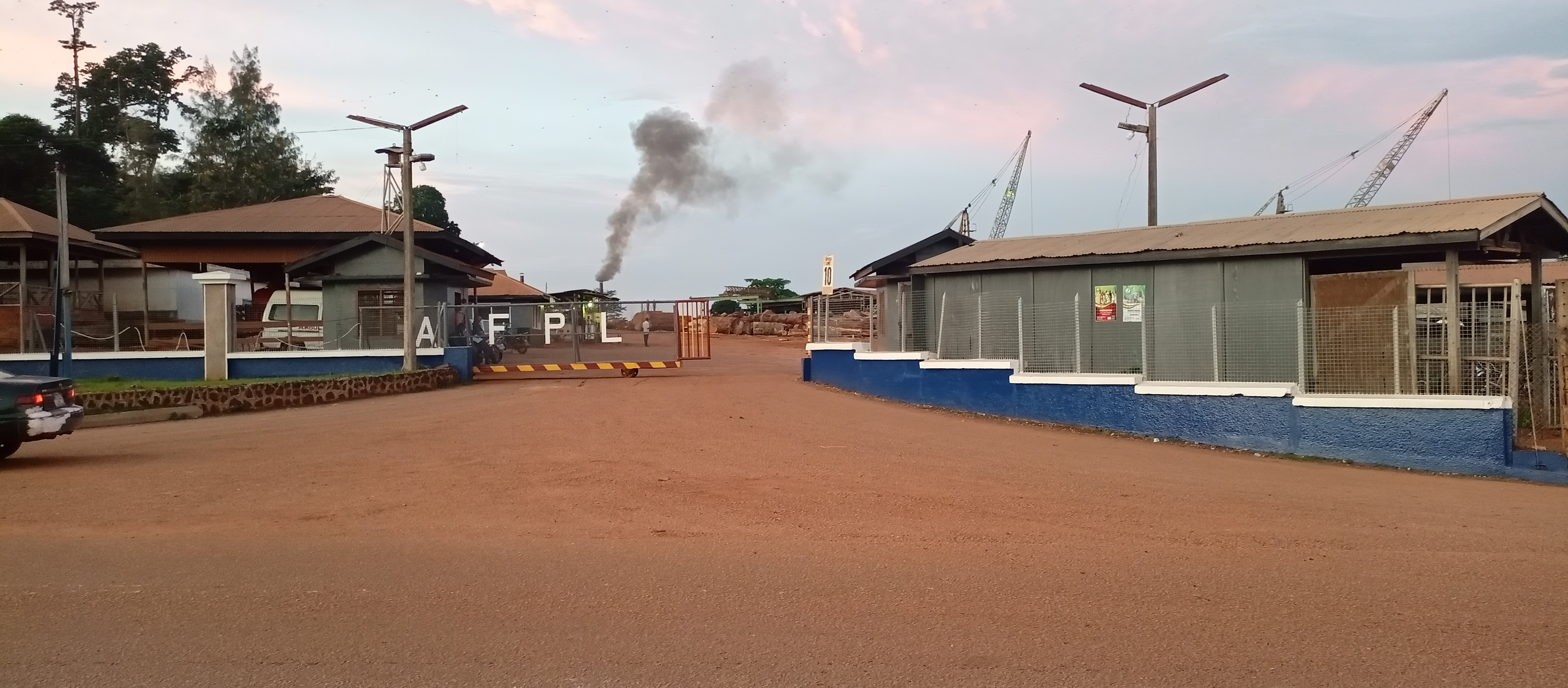
Ayum Forest Products Ltd. (A. F. P. L)

The cashew plantations in Mim area also provide constant source of raw materials for the Mim Cashew and Agricultural products Ltd which produces the 'Mim Cashew Brandy'.

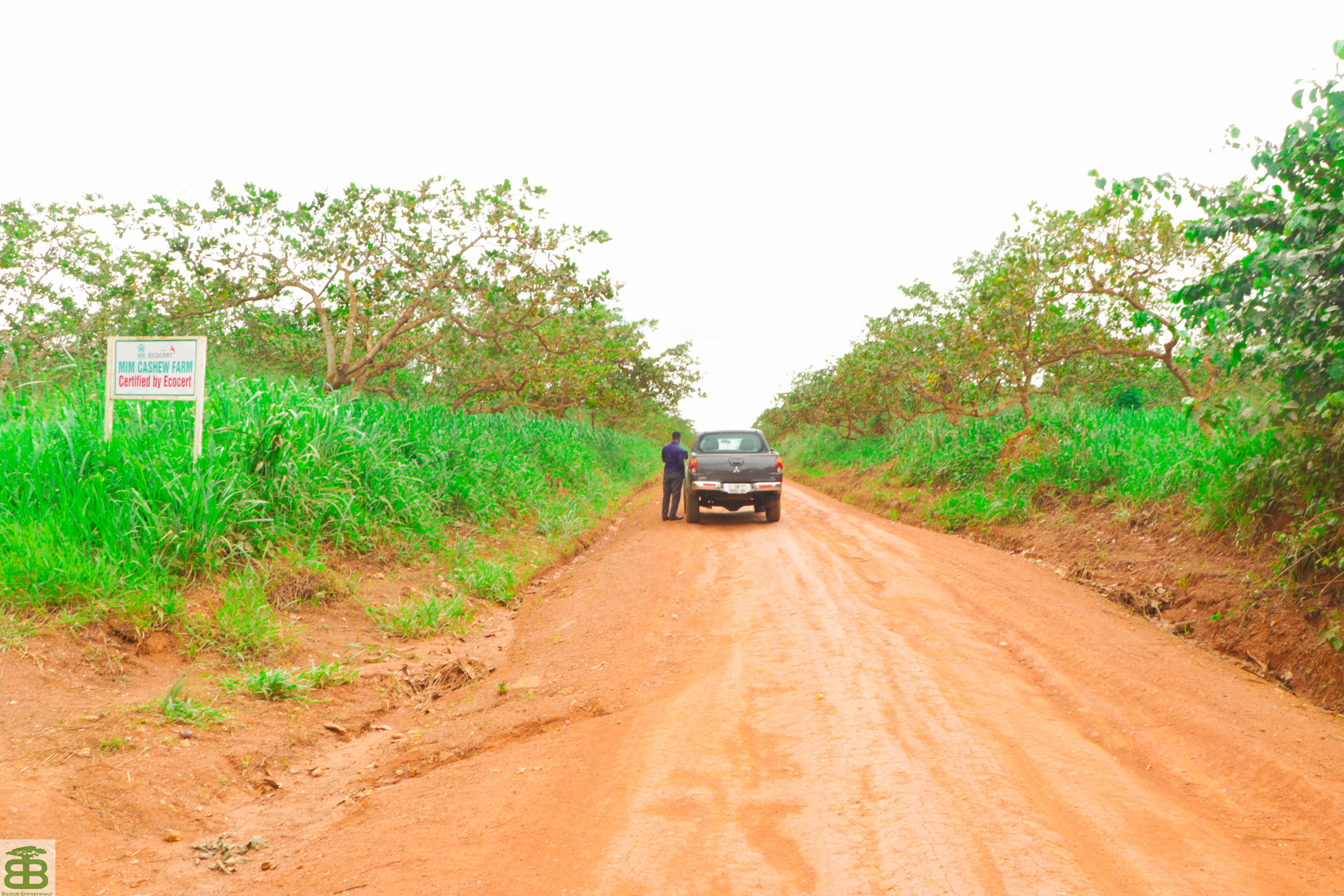
Mim Cashew plantation

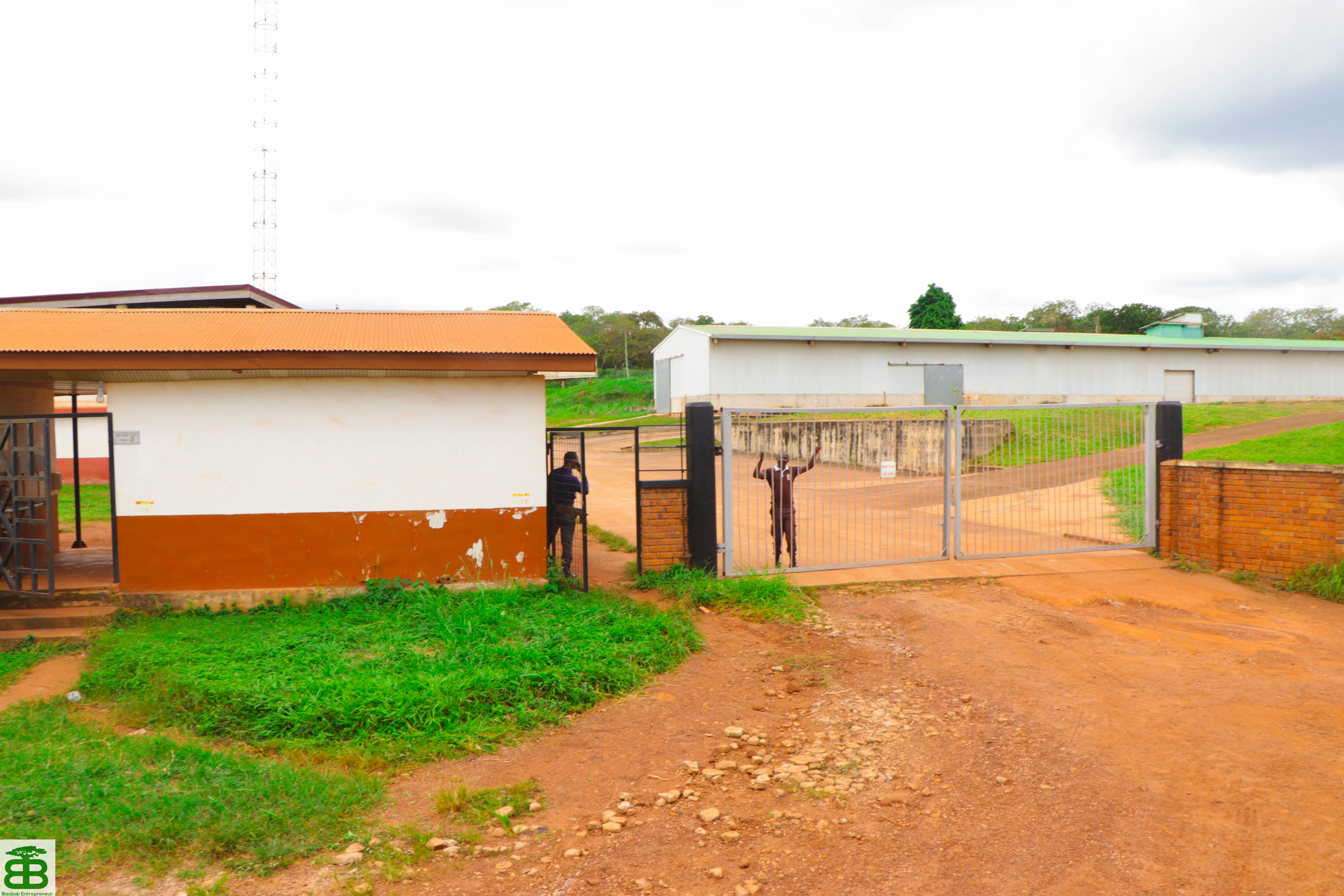
Mim Cashew Co. Main Entrance

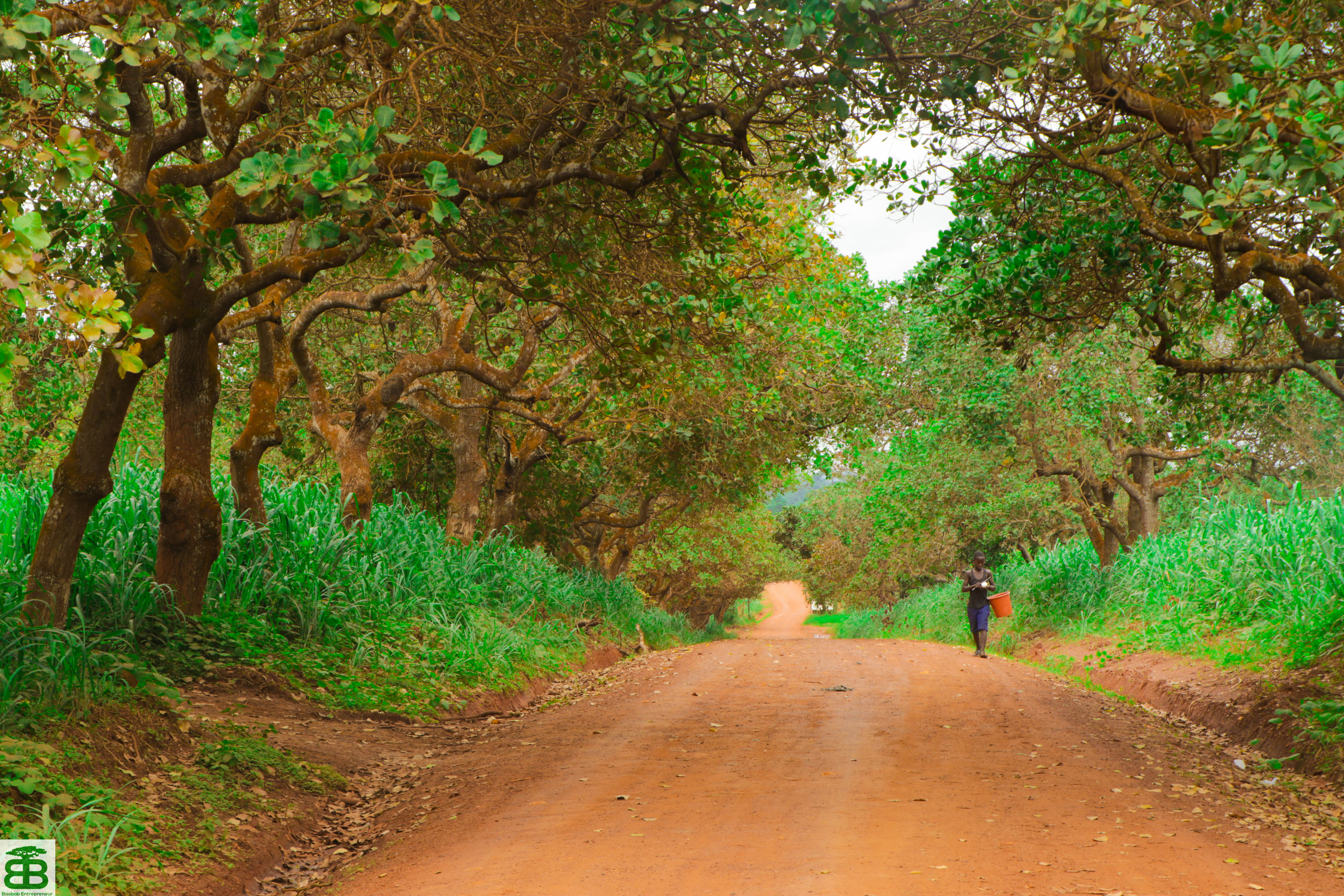
Mim Cashew Plantation

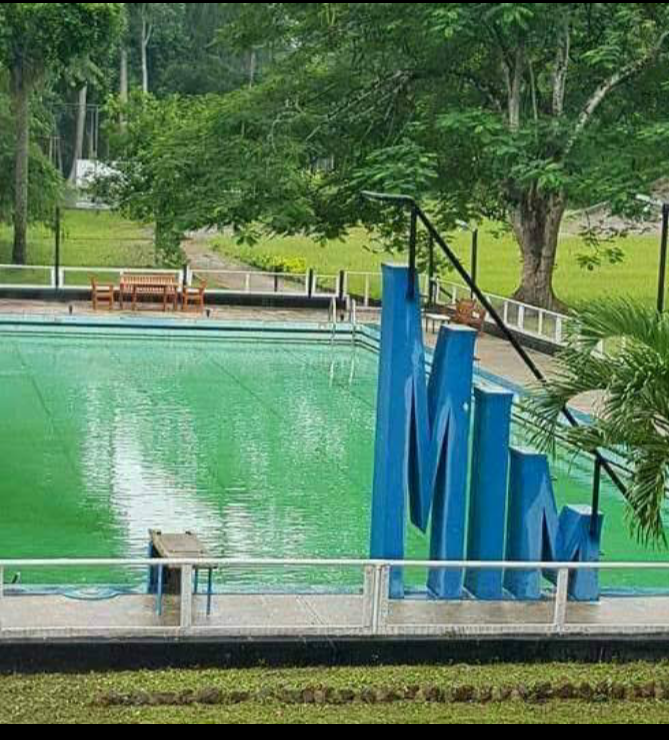
Mim Swimming pool

== Tourism ==
One of the tourist sites in Mim is the Mim Bour or 'Mim mountains'. These Rocky Mountains are famous tourist attraction center in the Ahafo Region of Ghana. According to history, the paramount chief of Mim used to climb the Mim bour whenever he wanted to address his people, and it is also said that, from the top, he could see all the areas within his jurisdiction and even as far as Techiman and Kumasi. From the top of the Mim Bour, you have a plain view of the cashew plantation and surrounding areas.

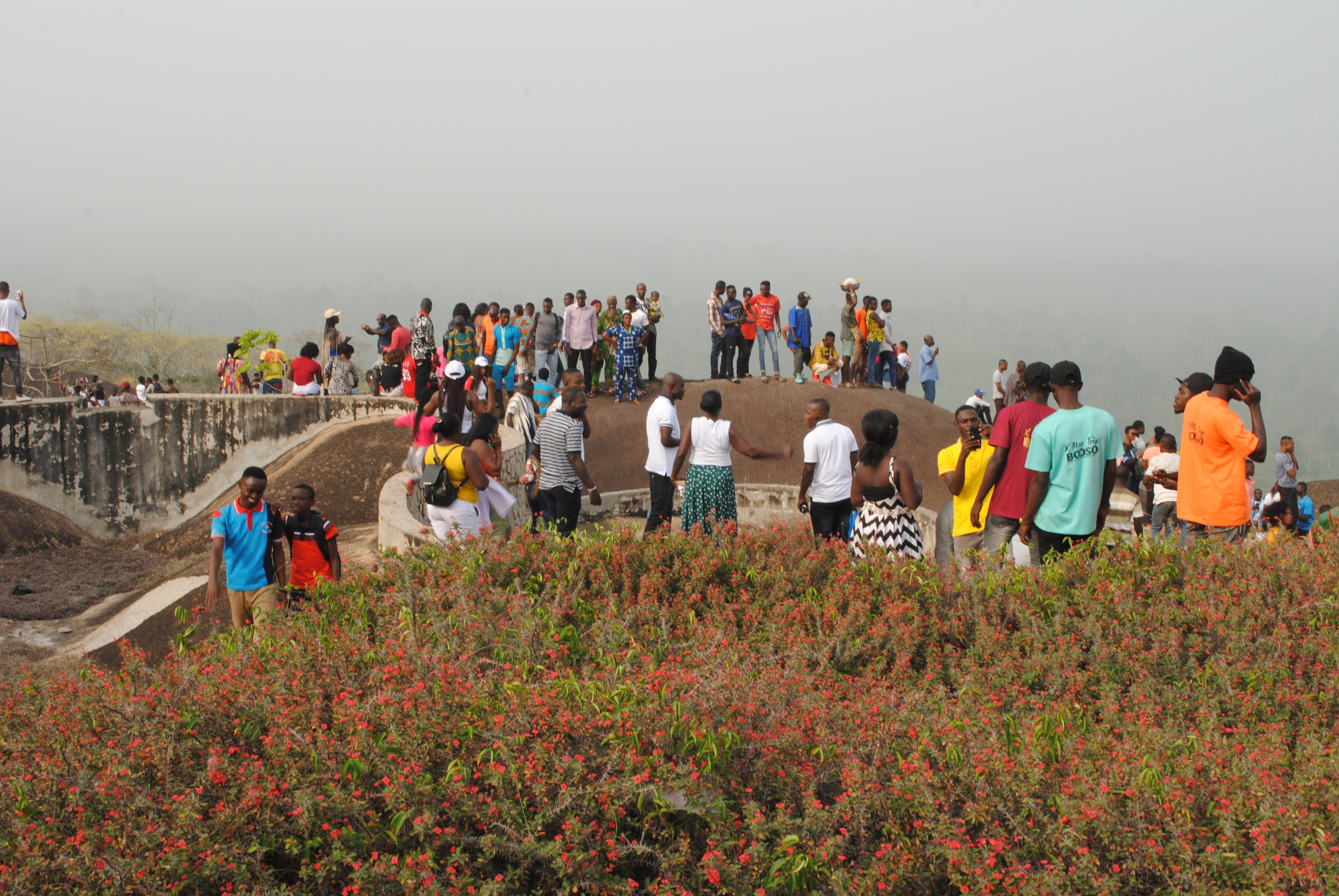
Tourists at Mim Bour

Mim Lake is another tourist attraction located off the Mim-Kenyasi road. It's about 1 km away north of the Mim township. This is an artificial lake where tourists and local people visit for leisure, canoeing and site seeing. This lake is also known as 'Anwomasu lake'.

== Education ==
Mim has several educational institutions including:

- Mim Senior High School
- Ghana Greentech Academy.
