= Community Health Nurses' Training College, Tanoso =

The Community Health Nurses' & Midwifery Training College (formerly known as Community Health Nurses' Training) is public tertiary health education institution in Tanoso in the Ahafo Region of Ghana. The college is in the Tano North District. The activities of the institution are supervised by the Ministry of Health.

The Community Health Nurses' & Midwifery Training College was established in October 2003 in accordance with the Government policy to establish a Community Health Nurses' Training School in every region in Ghana. This was made possible through the efforts of Ernest Akoubour Debrah (former Regional Minister of Brong Ahafo), Nana Asare Baffour, and Chief Ibrahim (former Regional Director of Health Service). The college is affiliated with the Kwame Nkrumah University of Science and Technology (KNUST), and accredited by the National Accreditation Board of Ghana. It holds a professional accreditation from the Nursing and Midwifery Council of Ghana.

== Principals of the College ==
1. Josephine Koranteng Asare 2003 - 2011

2. Abotzabire A William 2011 - 2015

3. Francis Ayaba (FGCNM) 2015 - 2016

4. Elizabeth Wiafe 2016 - 2023

5. Mrs. Gertrude Nancy Annan-Aidoo 2023 to 2025

6. Mrs. Ophelia Nkrumah 2025 - Date

== Academic Programmes ==
- Registered Public Health Nursing (Diploma)
- Registered Nurse Assistant Preventive (Certificate)
- Registered General Nursing (Diploma)
- Registered Midwifery (Diploma)
