= Addae Tuntum Festival =

Festival in Ghana by the people of Kukoum

Addae Tuntum Festival (Akwasidae Tuntum) is an annual festival celebrated by the chiefs and people of Kukuom-Asunafo in the Ahafo Region, formerly Brong Ahafo region of Ghana. It is usually celebrated in the month of January or in December.

== Celebrations ==
During the festival, visitors are welcomed to share food and drinks. The people put on traditional clothes and there is a durbar of chiefs. There is also dancing and drumming.

== Significance ==
This festival is celebrated to mark the event of the Ebirimoro war between the Sefwis and Ahafos in the 18th century. The festival is also held to re-affirm the people's commitment to their chief.
