= Kwadwo Addaikrom =

City in Ahafo region, Ghana

- Town
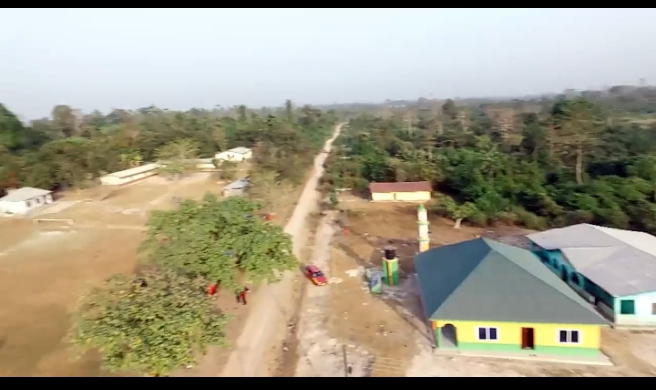
- Kwadwo Addaikrom - Mim direction

- Location within Ghana
- Coordinates: 6°59′28″N 2°42′52″W
- Country: Ghana
- Region: Ahafo Region
- District: Asunafo North Municipal District
- Time zone: GMT
  - Summer (DST): GMT

Kwadwo Addaikrom is a town about 24 km from Mim in the Asunafo North Municipal District in the Ahafo Region of Ghana. It serves as the center of the Bitre Electoral Area.

== Agriculture and amenities ==
Kwadwo Addaikrom is a farming community. The predominant cash crop grown in this area is cocoa. Different variety of food crops produced in Kwadwo Addaikrom are sent to big markets in Accra, Kumasi, Mim and Goaso.

The Chiefs and residents of the town recently registered their displeasure against the Ghana government over lack of water; lack of Maternity ward, dysfunctional telecommunication network and incomplete Police station

== History ==
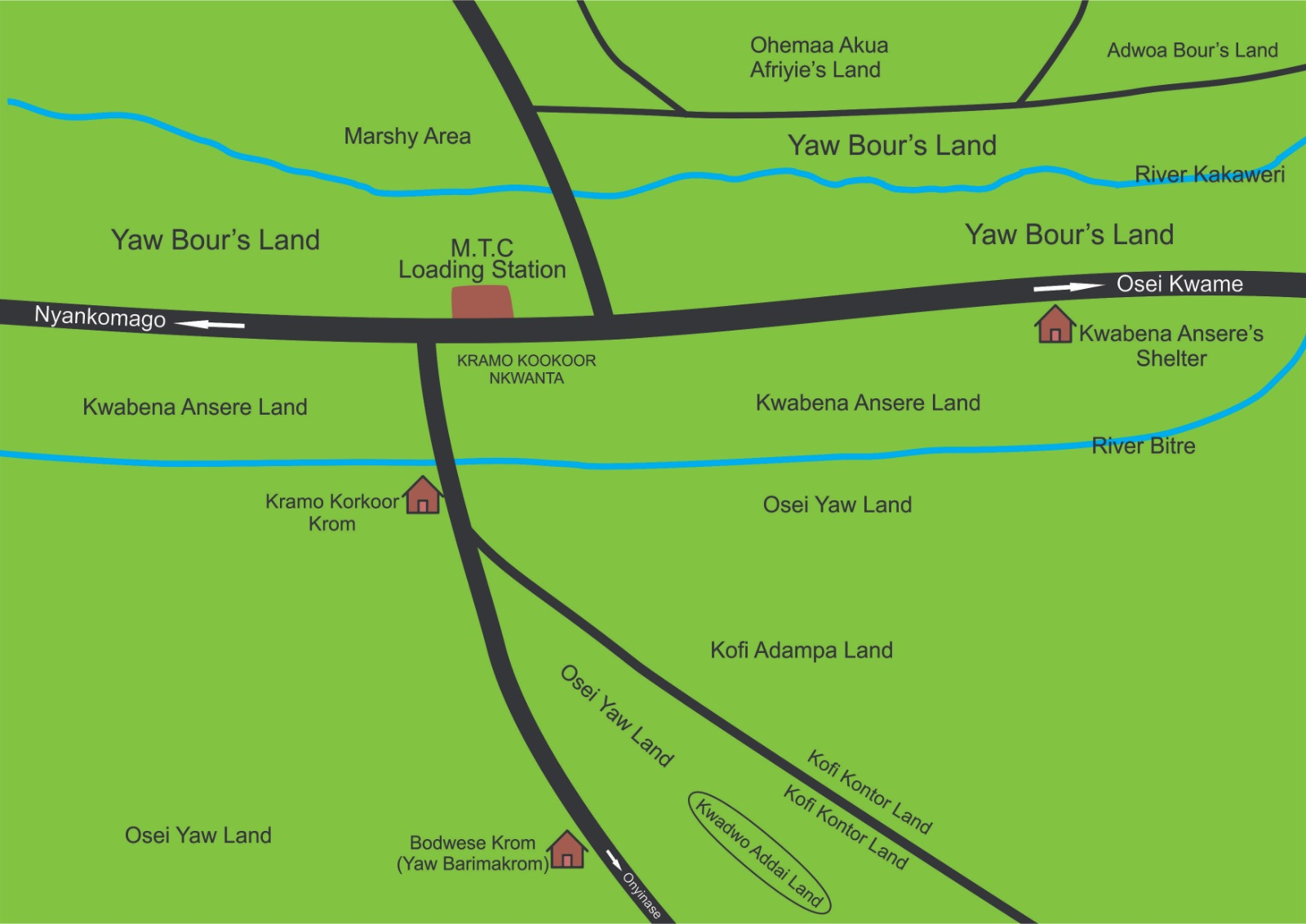
Lands acquired by the Akwasiase kinsmen

The present day Kwadwo Addaikrom was originally called Kramo Korkoor Nkwanta.

This village was founded by a group of Akwasiase kinsmen who moved from Mim to occupy a vast portion of then Bitre virgin forest.

Ohemaa Akua Afriyie was the first among the group to establish a settlement by building a mud house at an abandoned timber loading station that had been left behind by the Mim Timber Company(MTC).

Her settlement was nearby a footpath Junction that led to the hunting ground of a hunter called Kramo Korkoor.

This settlement by Ohemaa Akua Afriyie and her kinsmen therefore derived its name, Kramo Korkoor Nkwanta(junction) village now called Kwadwo Addaikrom.

== Local Administration ==
The community is ruled by the Chief, the Queen mother and the sub-Chiefs with support from the Assemblyman and the Unit committee members.

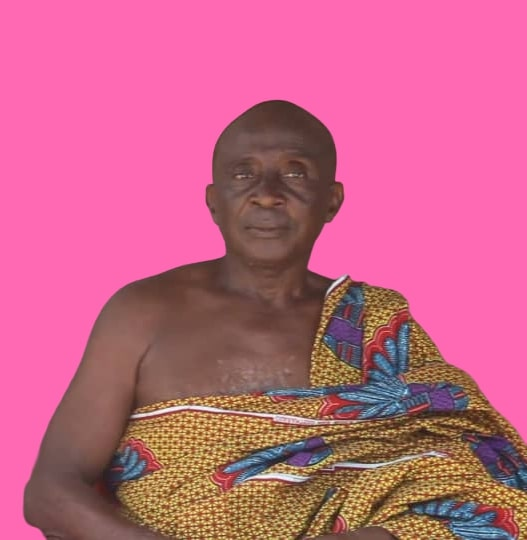
Nana Kofi Anane, Chief of Kwadwo Addaikrom

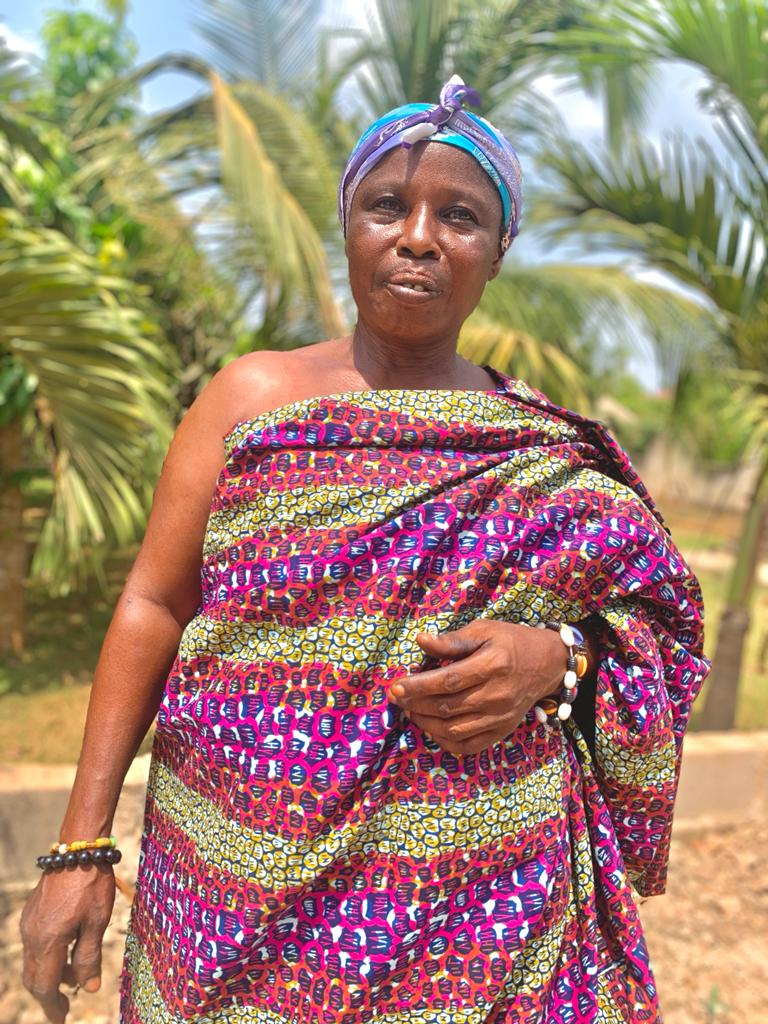
Nana Yaa Anokyewaa II, Queen mother of Kwadwo Addaikrom.

== Institutions ==
- Kwadwo Addaikrom CHPS compound
- Kwadwo Addaikrom Agric Office
- Kwadwo Addaikrom Police Station.
- Kwadwo Addaikrom M.A. Primary/JHS
- Kwadwo Addaikrom Golden Star Academy
