= Sankore, Ghana =

Community in Ahafo Region, Ghana

Sankore
- Town
- Location of Sankore in Ahafo Region
- Coordinates: 06°30′20.0″N 02°30′4.6″W
- Country: Ghana
- Region: Ahafo Region
- District: Asunafo South District
- Time zone: UTC0 (GMT)

Sankore is a farming community located in the Asunafo South District in the Ahafo Region of Ghana. As at 2023, the Krontihene of the town was Nana Tabiri Gyansah. As at 2019, the Chief of the town was Nana Ogyedom Appiah Kubi Pabo Katakye IV. The town is known for the cultivating of cocoa.

== Institutions ==
- Sankore Health Center
- Sankore Surgical Theater
- IBM Petroleum Limited
- Star Hospital
- Sankore Senior High School
