= Asunafo South District =

District in Ahafo Region, Ghana

- District
- Location of Asunafo South District within Ahafo Region
- Coordinates: 6°41′N 2°27′W
- Country: Ghana
- Region: Ahafo Region
- Capital: Kukuom

Government
  - District Executive: George Yaw Boakye

Area
  - Total: 1,019 km^{2} (393 sq mi)

Population (2021 Census)
  - Total: 91,693
  - Density: 89.98/km^{2} (233.1/sq mi)
- Time zone: UTC+0 (GMT)

Asunafo South District is one of the six districts in Ahafo Region, Ghana. Originally it was formerly part of the then-larger Asunafo District in 1988, until the southern part of the district was split off by a decree of president John Agyekum Kufuor on 12 November 2003 (effectively 17 February 2004) to create Asunafo South District; thus the remaining part has been renamed as Asunafo North District, which it was later elevated to municipal district assembly status on 29 February 2008 to become Asunafo North Municipal District. The district assembly is located in the western part of Ahafo Region and has Kukuom as its capital town.

== List of settlements ==
Settlements of Asunafo South District
No.	Settlement	Population	Population year
1	Abuom		
2	Anwiam		
3	Camp No. 1		
4	Dantano		
5	Kukuom		
6	Kwapong		
7	Noberkaw		
8	Sankore		
9	Asarekrom		
10	Nakete		
11	Kokooso		
