= Kukuom =

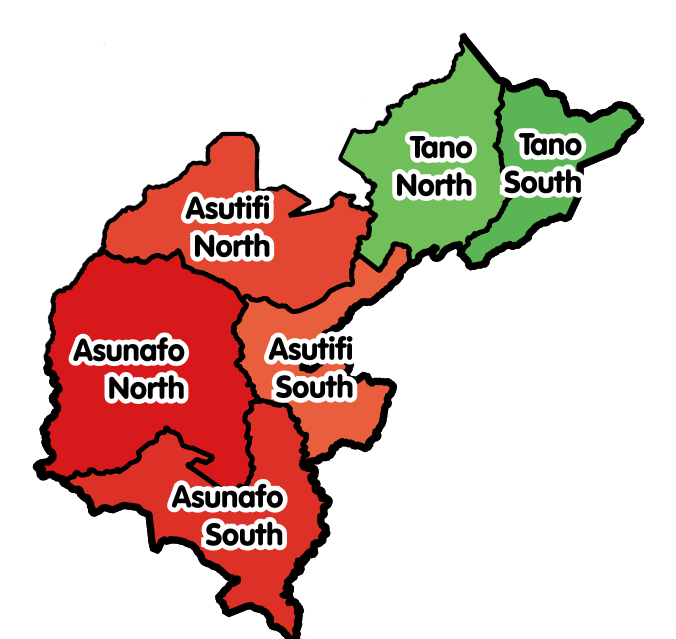
- Map showing the districts of the Ahafo Region of Ghana in 2019.

- Location of Kukuom in Ghana
- Coordinates: 6°40′N 2°27′W
- Country: Ghana
- Region: Ahafo Region
- District: Asunafo South District
- Time zone: GMT
  - Summer (DST): GMT

Kukuom is a town in the Ahafo Region of Ghana. It's the capital of Asunafo South District. Kukuom is known for The Kukuom Agric Secondary School. The school is a second cycle institution.

== See also ==
- Addae Tuntum Festival
