= MIMO (disambiguation) =

MIMO is multiple-input and multiple-output, a method for multiplying the capacity of a radio link.

MiMo or mimo may also refer to:

- Xiaomi MiMo, large language model developed by Xiaomi
- Miami Modern architecture, an architectural style
  - MiMo District, Miami, Florida, US
- Vicente Reynés Mimó (born 1981), Spanish cyclist
- Milano Monza Open-Air Motor Show, an annual auto show
- Musical Instrument Museums Online, a project; see Hornbostel–Sachs
- "Mimo-", a prefix used in taxonomy to mean mimicking
- "Mimo", a common nickname for Mimodactylus

== See also ==
- MIMOS, a Malaysian R&D organisation
- MIMOS II, an instrument used on the Mars exploration rovers
