= Tanoso =

- Interactive map of Tanoso
- Coordinates: 7°27′48.67″N 1°58′15.7″W
- Country: Ghana
- Region: Ashanti Region

Tanoso is a town in the Ashanti Region of Ghana. The town is known for the Yaa Asantewaa Girls Secondary School. The school is a second cycle institution.

== Education ==
- Community Health Nurses' Training College (2003)
