= Mim Lake =

Artificial reservoir in Ghana

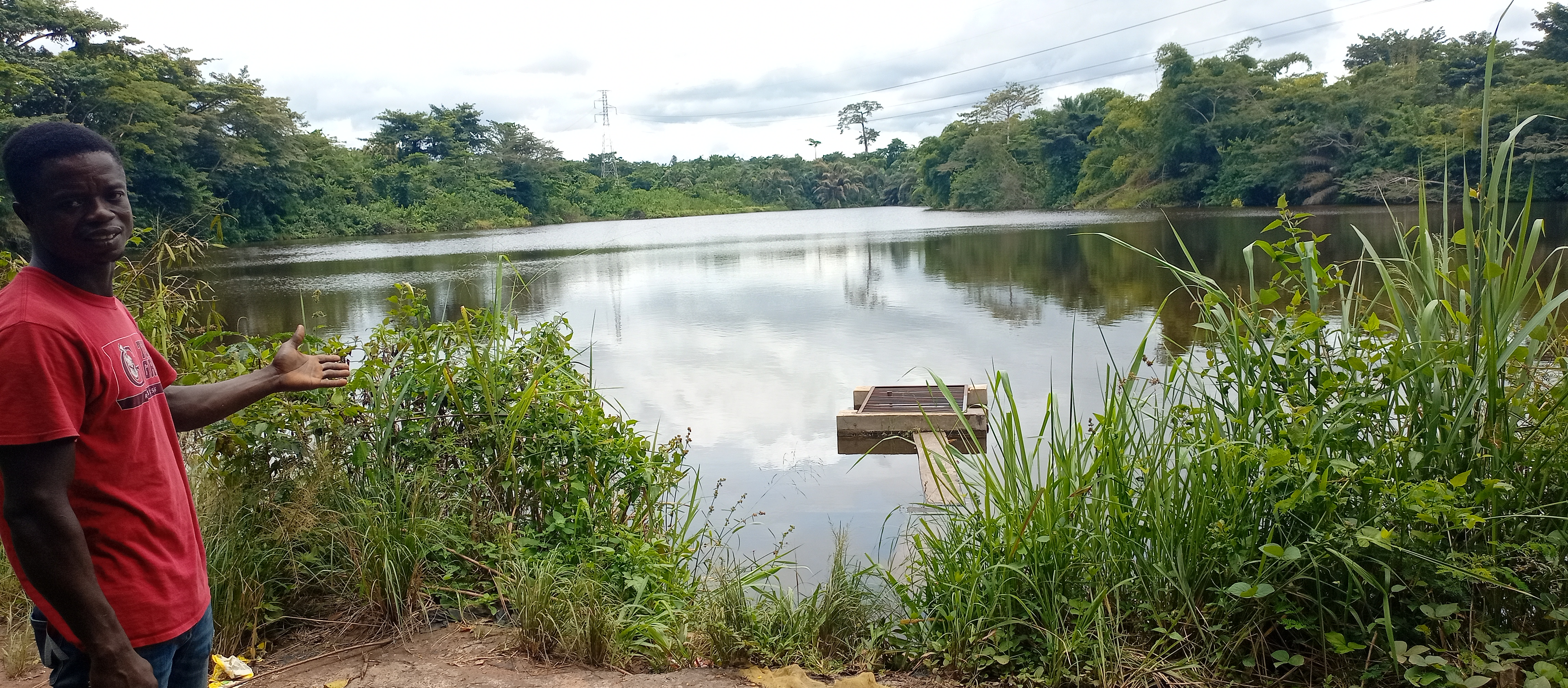

- Location within Ghana
- Location: Mim in Ahafo Region, Ghana.
- Coordinates: 6.91886°N 2.55275°W
- Type: Reservoir
- Primary inflows: rainfall
- Primary outflows: none
- Catchment area: 1.2 km^{2} (0.46 sq mi)
- Basin countries: Ghana
- Max. length: 0.45 km (1,500 ft)
- Max. width: 0.15 km (490 ft)
- Surface area: 0.1 km^{2} (0.039 sq mi)
- Average depth: 3.1 m (10 ft)
- Max. depth: 4.8 m (16 ft)
- Residence time: GMT
- Surface elevation: 220 m (720 ft)
- Settlements: Mim, Ahafo

Mim lake, originally known as the Anwomasu Lake, is an Inland lake located on the outskirts of Mim in the Asunafo North Municipal District in the Ahafo Region of Ghana. The lake is a latent tourist site and has the potential of a lake side Resort. Revellers often visit it for leisure.

== Geography ==
Mim lake at 6.91873°N 2.55269°W lies off the Mim - kenyasi road, about 1 km (0.62 mi) northwards of the Mim township. The main communities around this lake are the Mim old-airport quarters, Asukese, and Nkensere.

== History & People ==
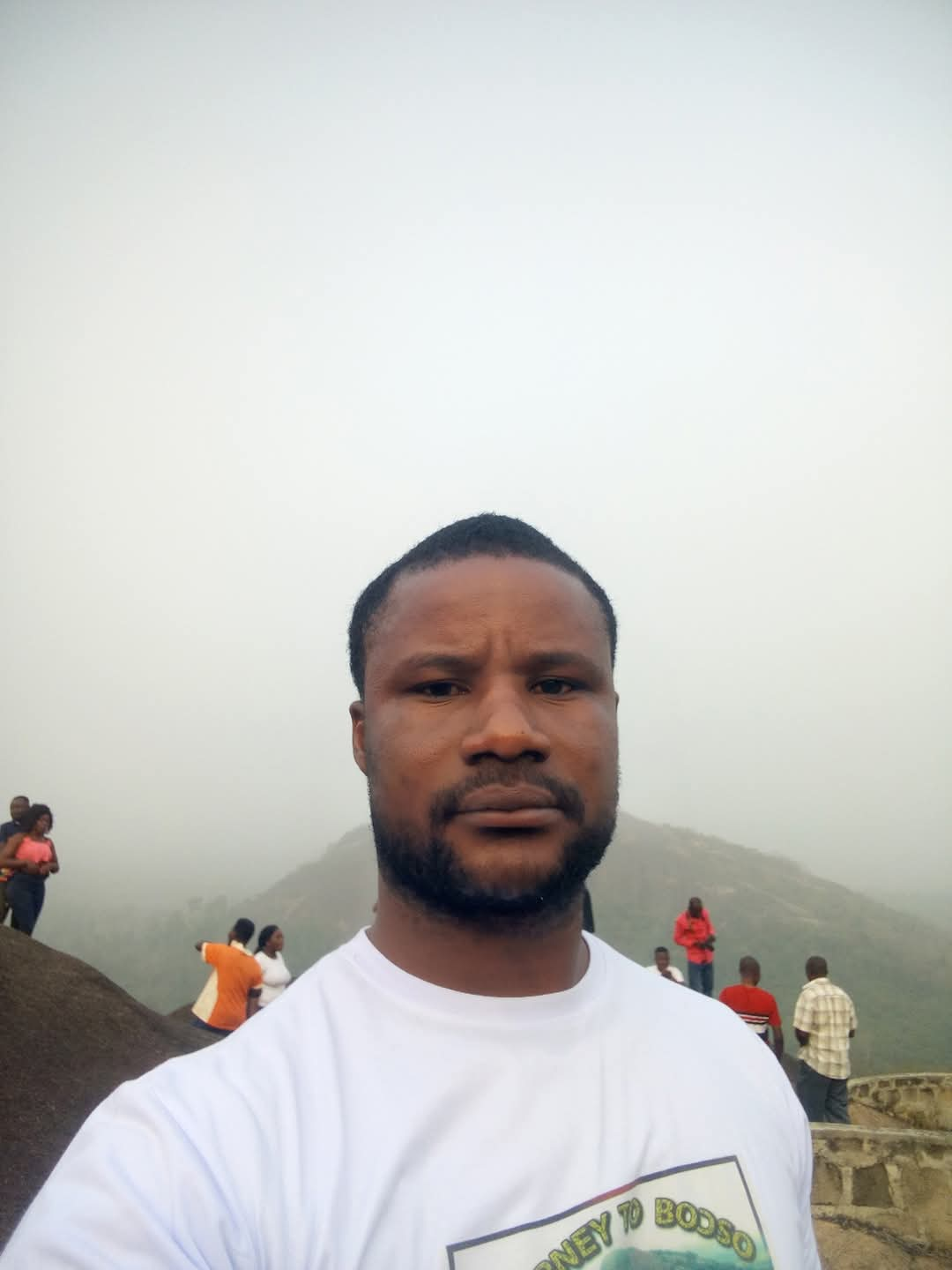
Hon. Boadu, a reveller of Mim Lake

This lake is an expansion of the old Anwomasu river which was a natural lake. The expansion turned the natural lake into artificial lake initially serving both industrial and domestic purposes.

After decades of use, the Lake with its diverse natural scenes is preserved as tourist attraction. The Lake has different species of flora and fauna. Among the fish species in the lake are the endemic cichlid hemichromis frempongi, and the near-endemic cichlids tilapia busumana and T. discolor.

This Lake is connected by a conduit pipe that leads to a Dam at 6.9105600°N 2.5605000°W, few meters away from the Ayum Forest Products Ltd. This Dam serves both industrial and domestic purposes.

== Incidents ==
There have been a couple of separate incidents when two people, aged 57 and 31 years, on different occasions drowned in the lake.
