= Goaso =

Capital of Ahafo Region, Ghana

- Regional Capital
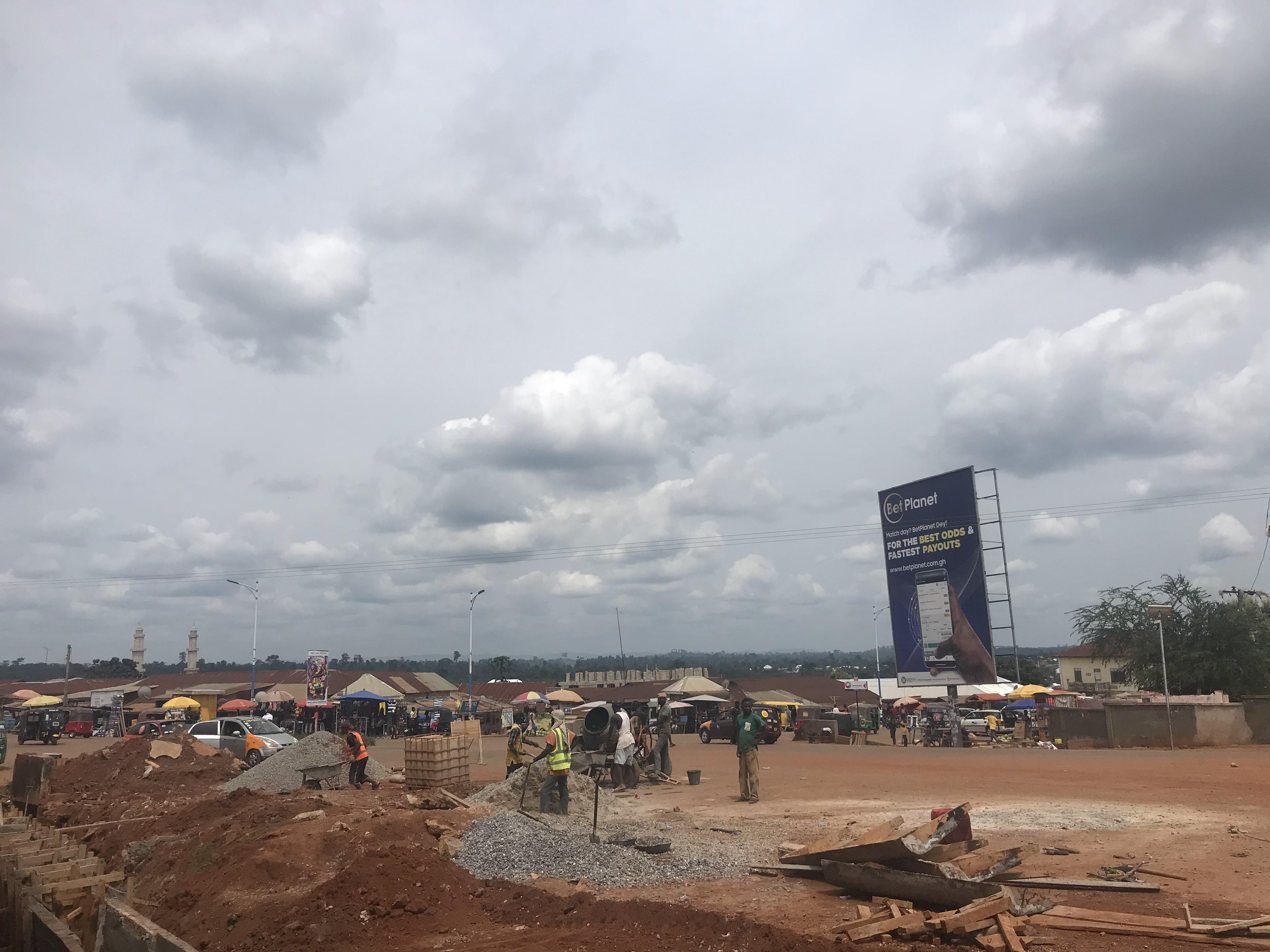

- Location of Goaso in Ahafo Region
- Coordinates: 6°48′N 2°31′W
- Country: Ghana
- Region: Ahafo Region
- District: Asunafo North Municipal District

Government
  - Type: Decentralised government
  - Municipal Chief Executive: Hon. Osei Yaw Boahen

Population (2010)
  - Total: 21,146
- Time zone: GMT
  - Summer (DST): GMT
- postal code: 003

Goaso is a city and the capital of the Asunafo North Municipal and the Ahafo Region of Ghana. It has population of 21,146 according to the 2010 census. The town is run by a traditional council, with Nana Akwasi Bosompra I having the title of Omanhene.

== History ==
According to oral traditions, Goaso (then known as Goaso Krodadaamu) was originally settled near Goa River. Due to occurring issues living near the river, the residents resettled uphill to the town's current location.

== Economy ==
Agriculture dominates most of the town's economy, with it employing about 60% of the population. Some cash crops grown include cocoa, cassavas, maize, and plantains.

== Health ==
The only major hospital in Goaso is the Ahafo Regional Hospital, which serves the entire region. Establish in 1950 and converted into a municipal hospital in 1987, the 118-bed facility serves about 60,000 patients annually.

== Geography ==
=== Topography ===
Goaso is described by gently undulating lowlands which is drain by three major rivers: Tano, Anum and Go. The town is located in a dense forest area, which is important for the hunting and charcoal production sectors of its economy. Although, the exploitation of its resources have increase the risk of forest fires in the area (including Goaso).

=== Climate ===
The town's climate is hot and humid and receives an annual rainfall of between 1500 mm and 1750 mm. The average temperatures range between 26 and 29 °C. There are two rainfall seasons: the major season occurs from April to July while the minor season begins in September and ends in October. The two dry seasons occurs between December and March and one in August.

Climate data for Goaso
Month	Jan	Feb	Mar	Apr	May	Jun	Jul	Aug	Sep	Oct	Nov	Dec	Year
Mean daily maximum °C (°F)	32.6 (90.7)	34.2 (93.6)	33.9 (93.0)	32.9 (91.2)	32.2 (90.0)	30.7 (87.3)	29.2 (84.6)	28.6 (83.5)	29.8 (85.6)	31.0 (87.8)	31.8 (89.2)	31.3 (88.3)	34.2 (93.6)
Mean daily minimum °C (°F)	18.6 (65.5)	20.8 (69.4)	22.0 (71.6)	22.2 (72.0)	22.4 (72.3)	22.0 (71.6)	21.6 (70.9)	21.4 (70.5)	21.8 (71.2)	21.8 (71.2)	21.7 (71.1)	20.5 (68.9)	18.6 (65.5)
Average precipitation mm (inches)	9.7 (0.38)	45.5 (1.79)	124.4 (4.90)	157.8 (6.21)	180.7 (7.11)	191.1 (7.52)	129.2 (5.09)	76.9 (3.03)	148.9 (5.86)	170.2 (6.70)	60.1 (2.37)	32.6 (1.28)	1,327.1 (52.24)
Average precipitation days	1.0	3.0	7.0	9.0	11.0	12.0	9.0	8.0	11.0	13.0	5.0	2.0	91
Source: World Meteorological Organization

== Culture ==
The town helds the bi-annual Abetiase festival to celebrated their traditions and their roles for the Golden Stool.

== Education ==
There are several educational institutions in Goaso. Notable ones include Goaso Nursing and Midwifery Training College and Ahafoman Senior High.

== See also ==
- Bibiani
- Asante people
- Roman Catholic Diocese of Goaso
