= Asunafo North Municipal District =

Municipal District in Ahafo Region, Ghana

- Municipal District
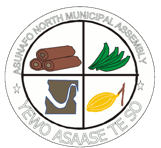
- Seal

- Location of Asunafo North Municipal District within Ahafo Region
- Coordinates: 6°48′N 2°31′W
- Country: Ghana
- Region: Ahafo Region
- Capital: Goaso

Government
  - Municipal Chief Executive: Yaw Osei Boahen

Area
  - Total: 1,093 km^{2} (422 sq mi)

Population (2021)
  - Total: 150,198
  - Density: 137.4/km^{2} (355.9/sq mi)
- Time zone: UTC+0 (GMT)

Asunafo North Municipal District is one of the six districts in Ahafo Region, Ghana. It was formerly part of the then-larger Asunafo District from 1988 until the southern part of the district was split off by a decree of president John Agyekum Kufuor on 12 November 2003 (effectively 17 February 2004) to become Asunafo South District. The remaining northern part was renamed as Asunafo North District which was later elevated to municipal status on 29 February 2008 to become Asunafo North Municipal District. The municipality is located in the western part of Ahafo Region and has Goaso as its capital town.

== History ==
Asunafo North Municipal District is one of the 260 Metropolitan, Municipal and District Assemblies (MMDAs) in Ghana, and forms part of the 6 Municipalities and Districts in the Ahafo Region. It was one of the first Districts created in the then Brong-Ahafo Region dating back as far as 1912.

Asunafo North Municipal District lies between latitudes 6°27°N and 7.00°N and longitudes 2°52°W and shares common boundaries with Asutifi South District in the north east, Dormaa Central Municipal on the north west and Juaboso District and Sefwi-Wiaso Municipal in Western North Region on the west-south borders, and Asunafo South District in the Ahafo Region on the south-eastern borders.

The total land size of the Municipality is 1093.7 km2 with 389.7 km2 covered by forest reserves. The population of the Municipality according to 2010 population and housing census stands at 124,685 with 62,854 males and 61,831 females.

== List of settlements ==
Settlements of Asunafo North Municipal District
No.	Settlement	Population	Population year
1	Mim	30,753	2017
2	Goaso	24,846	2017
3	Akrodie	5,259	2017
4	Fawohoyeden	5,168	2017
5	Kasapin	4,563	2017
6	Ayomso	4,097	2017
7	Bediako	3,212	2017
8	Dominase	2,081	2017
9	Asumura	2,212	2017
10	Pomaakrom	1,542	2017
11	Bitre Ahenkro (Kojo Addai)	1,420	2017
12	Nyamekyebekyere	1,274	2017
13	Ampenkro	1,159	2017
14	Abebresekrom	1,126	2017
15	Gyakontabuo	1,108	2017
16	Kwaopotey	1,086	2017
17	Nyankomagokrom	1,023	2017
18	Kofi Mmerekrom	1,016	2017
19	Daseana	1,012	2017
19	Gyasikrom	1,002	2017

== Sources ==
- "Asunafo North Municipal District". Statoids.
- District: Asunafo North Municipal District
- 19 New Districts Created , November 20, 2003.
