= Ahafo Region =

Region of Ghana

Coordinates: 7°00′N 2°27′W

Ahafo
- Region
- Ahafo Region
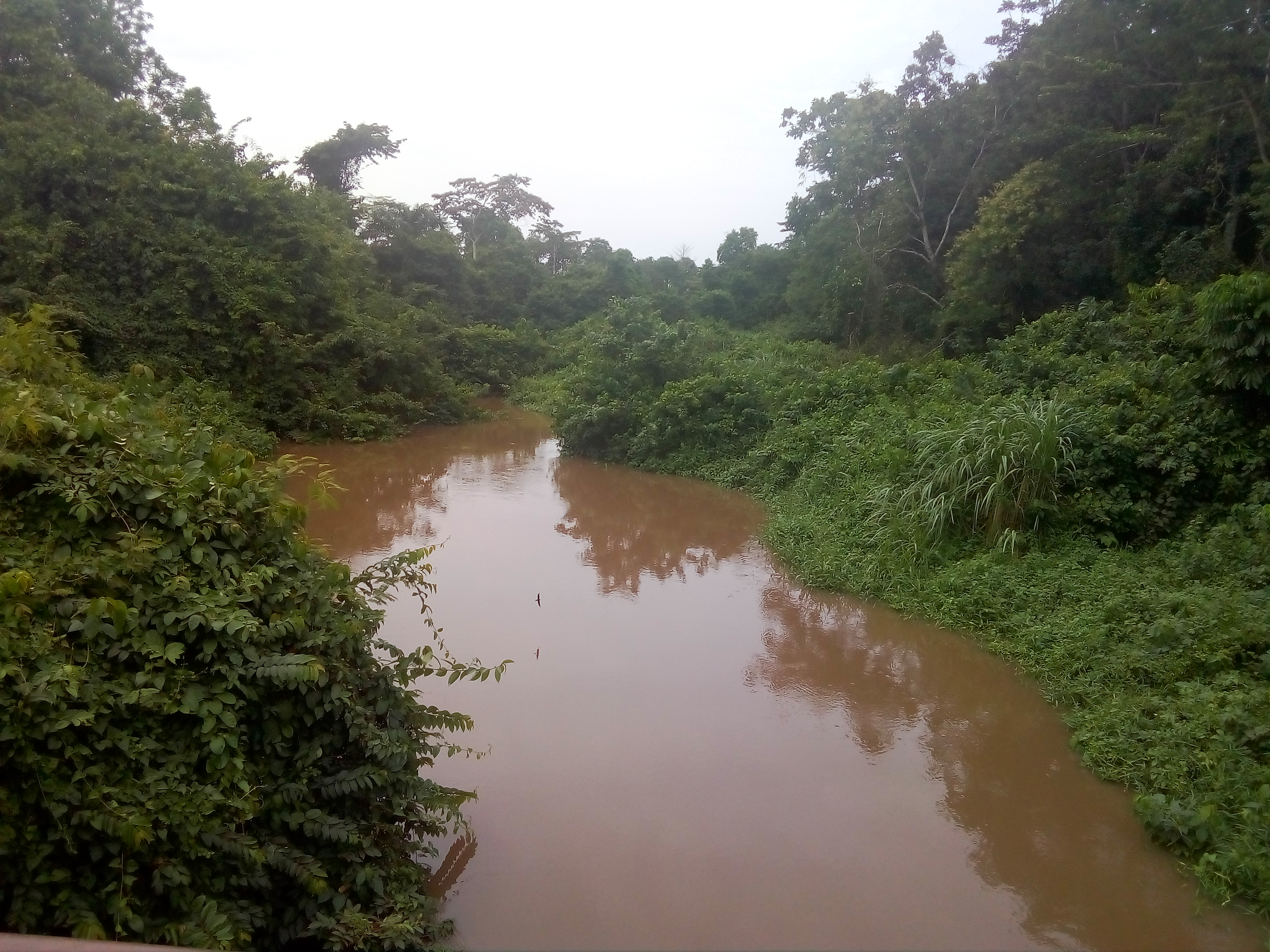
- The Tano River

- Location of Ahafo in Ghana
- Country: Ghana
- Capital: Goaso

Government
  - Largest Town: Mim, Ahafo
  - Regional Minister: Charity Gardiner

Area
  - Total: 5,193 km^{2} (2,005 sq mi)

Population (2021 census)
  - Total: 564,668
  - Rank: Ranked 16th
  - Density: 109/km^{2} (280/sq mi)

GDP (PPP)

GDP (Nominal)
- Time zone: GMT
- Area code: 035

The Ahafo Region is a new region in Ghana, created on 27 December 2018, with Goaso as its capital. The region has administrative and governmental legislature like all the ten already existing regions in Ghana. The region was carved out of the south-eastern part of the Brong Ahafo Region and was in fulfilment of a campaign promise made by the New Patriotic Party. Prior to the 2016 Ghanaian general election, the then candidate Nana Akufo-Addo declared that when elected, he would explore the possibility of creating new regions out of some of the existing regions in Ghana in order to bring government closer to citizens.

The execution of plans for the creation of the regions was assigned to the newly created Ministry of Regional Reorganization and Development which is under the leadership of Hon. Dan Botwe, the Government of Ghana minister charged with the responsibility of supervising the creation of new regions in Ghana. In March 2017, the ministry sent the blueprint for the creation of the region, along with others, to the Council of State. The council met over 36 times from the time of submission to August 2017. The final stage for the creation of the region was decided through a referendum by the people within the catchment of the new region on 27 December 2018.

== Major towns ==
Major Towns of Ahafo Region.
No.	Settlement	Population	Population year
1	Mim, Ahafo	30,753	2017
2	Goaso	24,846	2017
3	Bechem	17,677	2013
4	Duayaw Nkwanta	16,541	2013
5	Techimantia		
6	Kenyasi		
7	Hwidiem		

== Administrative divisions ==
The political administration of the region is through the local government system. Under this administration system, the region is divided into six MMDA's (made up of 0 Metropolitan, 3 Municipal and 3 Ordinary Assemblies). Each District, Municipal or Metropolitan Assembly, is administered by a Chief Executive, representing the central government but deriving authority from an Assembly headed by a presiding member elected from among the members themselves. The current list is as follows:

Districts of the Ahafo Region
#	MMDA Name	Capital	MMDA Type	Chief Executive	Member of Parliament	Party
1	Asunafo North	Goaso	Municipal	Osei Yaw Boahen	Evans Bobie Opoku	NPP
2	Asunafo South	Kukuom	Ordinary	Frank Aduse Poku	Eric Opoku	NDC
3	Asutifi North	Kenyasi	Ordinary	Anthony Mensah	Patrick Banor	NPP
4	Asutifi South	Hwidiem	Ordinary	Robert Mensah Dwomoh	Collins Dauda	NDC
5	Tano North	Duayaw Nkwanta	Municipal	Ernest Kwarteng	Freda Prempeh	NPP
6	Tano South	Bechem	Municipal	Collins Takyi Offinam	Benjamin Yeboah Sekyere	NPP

== History ==
A referendum on 27 December 2018 approved the creation of the Ahafo Region. Out of a total of 307,108 registered votes, 277,663 took part in the referendum, with 276,763 (99.68 per cent) voting in favour of the creation of the new region. 675 (0.24 per cent) rejected the motion, and 225 rejected ballots represented 0.08% of total votes cast. The region was created on 13 February 2019 by Constitutional Instrument 114. Goaso was announced as the capital of the new region.

== Economy ==
Residents of Ahafo Region are predominantly agriculture farmers who produce both cash crops and food crops. The predominant cash crop grown in the region is cocoa.

Plantain and Cassava are the major food crops produced in the region, and these farm products are mainly from Sankore, Kwadwo Addaikrom, and Asumura localities.

The Region is endowed with rich natural resources such as Gold, Diamonds, Timber. Gold deposits abound in large quantities in Mim, Kenyasi and Yamfo zones. Newmont Gold Ghana Limited, which is one of the biggest mining companies in the world, currently has its mining operations in Kenyasi and Yamfo zones.

Ahafo Region, which is one of the forest belts in Ghana, has a lot of forest reserves. The timber industry is the second-highest employer in the region. There are large and medium timber companies scattered across the region. Notable among the timber companies in the region are Ayum Forest Products Co. Ltd, Exbo wood Co. Ltd, Ocean-wood Co. Ltd, and Supremo-wood processing Co LTD, all in Mim, Ahafo.

Ahafo Region is known to be the breadbasket of Ghana. The soil type in the region supports the production of both food and cash crops. The region is known for its large cocoa and cashew productions. The major agro-processing company in the region is the Mim Cashew & Agric Products company LTD, located at Mim, Ahafo.

== Tourism ==
Tourist attractions in the Ahafo Region are:

- Mim Bour (Mim rock) at Mim, Ahafo
- Mim Lake also in Mim, Ahafo
- The White-necked Rockfowl conservation at Asumura
- Okomfo Anokye tree at Sankore

== Geography and climate ==
=== Location and size ===
The Ahafo Region is bordered on the north by the Bono Region, on the east by the Ashanti Region, on the west by the Bono Region, and on the south by the Western North Region and is made up of 6 districts.

=== Climate and vegetation ===
The Ahafo Region is part of the forest belt of Ghana and has vegetation consisting predominantly of fertile soil and grassland, especially savanna with clusters of drought-resistant trees such as baobabs or acacias. Between December and April is the dry season. The wet season is between about July and November, with an average annual rainfall of 750 to 1050 mm (30 to 40 inches). The highest temperatures are reached at the end of the dry season; the lowest are in December and January. However, the hot Harmattan wind from the Sahara blows frequently between December and the beginning of February. The temperatures can vary between 14 °C (59 °F) at night and 40 °C (104 °F) during the day.

== See also ==
- Roman Catholic Diocese of Goaso
