= Tano =

Tano may refer to

== Places ==
Ghana/Ivory Coast

- Tano North District and
- Tano South District in Ghana, which make up
  - Tano North (Ghana parliament constituency) and
  - Tano South (Ghana parliament constituency)
- Tano River or Tanoé River in Ghana and Ivory Coast

Italy

- Tano, Italy, a place in Campania

Japan

- Tano, Ehime, a former village in Ehime Prefecture, Japan
- Tano, Kōchi, a town in Japan
- Tano District, Gunma in Japan
- Tano Station (disambiguation), either one of the train stations named thus, in Kōchi or in Miyazaki prefecture of Japan
- Tano, Miyazaki, a former Japanese town, now part of the city of Miyazaki

== Other ==
- Tano (name), a given name and surname
- Tano (Ta Kora), the Akan God of war and strife
- Ta-no-Kami, a Japanese spirit believed to observe the harvest of rice plants
- Tano languages, a group of Kwa languages spoken in the Tano River region
- Ahsoka Tano, a character in the Star Wars franchise
- Hopi-Tewa, a Pueblo group from Arizona
- Bofoakwa Tano, a football team from Sunyani, Ghana
- Italians in Argentina, in Argentine slang
- Tano (publisher), a former Norwegian publishing company absorbed by Universitetsforlaget
- Tano Cariddi, a character in the Italian TV drama La piovra
- Tano-Sitha, a binary star system in the Nightfall universe

== See also ==
- Tanno
