= Adjei =

Adjei is a surname. Notable people with the surname include:

- Benjamin Adjei (born 1990), German politician
- Daniel Adjei (born 1995), footballer for Hashtag United
- David Adjei (born 1977), Ghanaian footballer
- Eric Adjei (born 1984), Ghanaian footballer
- Felix Adjei (born 1990), Ghanaian footballer
- Francis Adjei (born 1996), Ghanaian footballer
- Frank Adjei (born 2004), Ghanaian footballer
- Joseph Adjei (born 1995), Ghanaian footballer
- Lawrence Adjei (born 1979), Ghanaian footballer
- Mamé Adjei (born 1991), Ghanaian-American model
- Mavis Adjei (born 1982), Ghanaian actor
- Natey Adjei (born 1989), Canadian football player
- Nathaniel Adjei (born 2002), Ghanaian footballer
- Raymond Adjei (born 2004), Swedish footballer
- Richard Adjei (born 1983), German bobsledder
- Sam Adjei (1948–2016), Ghanaian public health figure
- Sammi Adjei (born 1973), Ghanaian footballer
- Sammy Adjei (born 1980), Ghanaian footballer
- Samuel Adjei (born 1992), Swedish footballer
- Simon Adjei (born 1993), Swedish footballer

== See also ==
- Adji (disambiguation)
- Agyei
- Andrews Adjei-Yeboah, Ghanaian politician
- Ebenezer Ako-Adjei (1916–2002), Ghanaian politician
- Akwasi Osei-Adjei, Ghanaian politician
