= Tano District, Ghana =

Tano District
- Former District
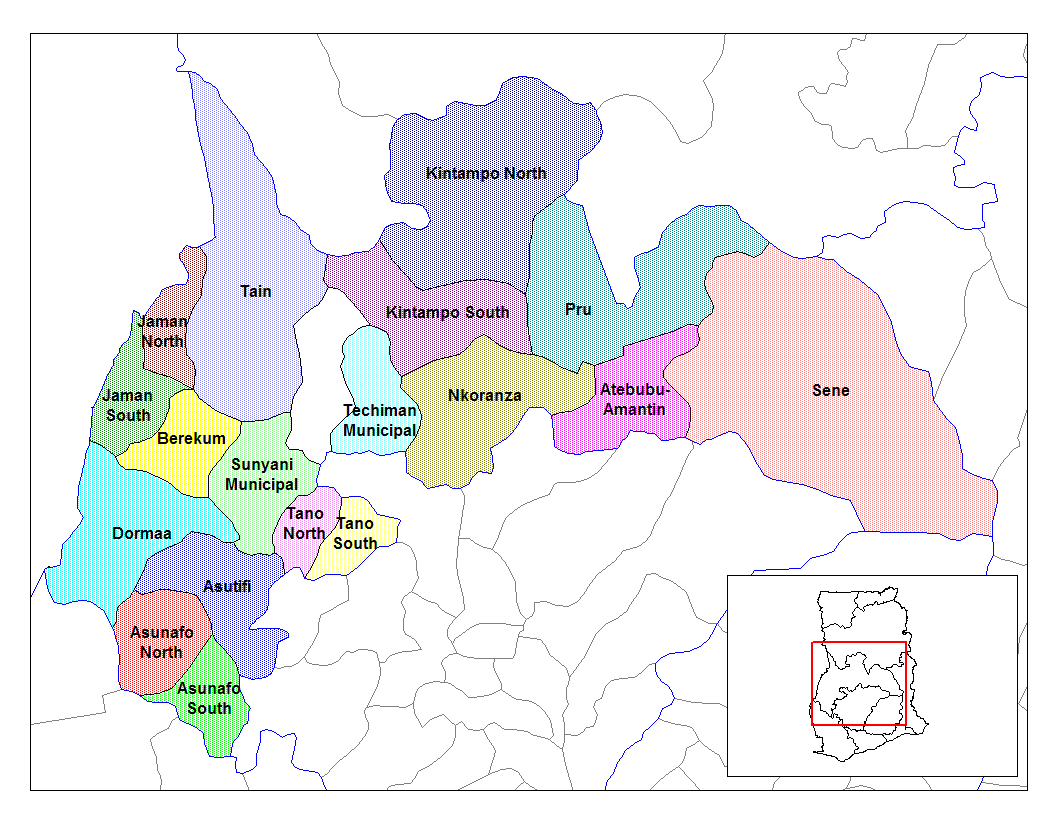
- Districts of Brong-Ahafo Region

- Location of Tano District within Brong-Ahafo
- Coordinates: 7°05′N 2°01′W
- Country: Ghana
- Region: Brong-Ahafo
- Capital: Bechem

Population (2012)
  - Total: —
- Time zone: UTC+0 (GMT)

Tano District is a former district that was located in Brong-Ahafo Region (now currently in Ahafo Region), Ghana. Originally created as an ordinary district assembly in 1988. However, on 17 February 2004, it was split off into two new districts: Tano South District (which it was elevated to municipal district assembly status in April 2018; capital: Bechem) and Tano North District (which it was also elevated to municipal district assembly status in April 2018; capital: Duayaw-Nkwanta). The district assembly was located in the southwest part of Brong-Ahafo Region (now eastern part of Ahafo Region) and had Bechem as its capital town.

== Sources ==
- "Tano District". Statoids.
- 19 New Districts Created , November 20, 2003.
