= Andrews Adjei-Yeboah =

Ghanaian politician

Hon. Andrews Adjei-Yeboah

Member of the Ghana Parliament for Tano South
- In office 7 January 2009 – 6 January 2013
- President: John Atta Mills; John Mahama
- Succeeded by: Hanna Louisa Bissiw

Member of Parliament for Tano South Constituency
- In office 7 January 2005 – 6 January 2009
- President: John Kufuor

Member of Parliament for Tano South Constituency
- In office 7 January 2001 – 6 January 2005
- President: John Kufuor

Personal details
- Born: 26 November 1955 (age 70)
- Party: New Patriotic Party
- Children: 3
- Education: University of Ghana
- Profession: Managers/Administrators

Andrews Adjei-Yeboah was the member of parliament for Tano South constituency for the 5th parliament of the 4th republic of Ghana.

== Early life and education ==
Adjei-Yeboah was born on 26 November 1955. He comes from Techimantia in the Ahafo Region of Ghana. He graduated from the University of Ghana with Bachelor of Science in Administration in 1982.

== Career ==
Adjei-Yeboah was the chief executive officer of Farest Wood Products Company Limited before he became a Member of Parliament.

== Politics ==
Adjei Yeboah was first elected as the Member of parliament for the Tano South constituency in the Brong Ahafo region of Ghana for the 3rd parliament of the 4th republic of Ghana.

In 2000, Adjei-Yeboah won the Ghanaian general elections as the member of parliament for the Tano South constituency of the Brong Ahafo Region of Ghana. He won on the ticket of the New Patriotic Party. His constituency was a part of the 14 parliamentary seats out of 21 seats won by the New Patriotic Party in that election for the Brong Ahafo Region. The New Patriotic Party won a majority total of 100 parliamentary seats out of 200 seats in the 3rd parliament of the 4th republic of Ghana. He was elected with 14,003 votes out of 24,920 total valid votes cast. This was equivalent to 57.3% of the total valid votes cast. He was elected over Kwadwo Owusu Agyeman of the National Democratic Congress, Yaw Amankwah of the Convention People's Party, John Arthur of the National Reform Party, Osman Asante-Bonsu of the People's National Convention. These won 9,885, 210, 198 and 134 votes respectively out of the total valid votes cast. These were equivalent to 40.5%, 0.9%, 0.8% and 0.5% respectively of total valid votes cast.

He was re-elected as the member of parliament for the Tano South constituency in the 2004 Ghanaian general elections. He thus represented the constituency in the 4th parliament of the 4th republic of Ghana. He was elected with 14997votes out of 27,844total valid votes cast. This was equivalent to 53.9% of total valid votes cast. He was elected over Boateng Frederick of the People's National Convention and Kwadwo Owusu Agyeman of the National Democratic Congress. These obtained 301votes and 12,546 votes respectively of the total valid votes cast. These were equivalent to 1.1% and 45.1% respectively of total valid votes cast. Adjei Yeboah was elected on the ticket of the New Patriotic Party. His constituency was a part of 14constituencies out of a total 24 constituencies won by the New Patriotic Party in the Brong Ahafo Region in that election. In all the New Patriotic Party won a majority total of 128parliamentary representation out of a total 230 parliamentary seats in the 4th parliament of the 4th republic of Ghana.

Adjei-Yeboah was elected as the Member of Parliament for the Tano South constituency in the 2008 Ghanaian general elections for the 5th parliament of the 4th republic of Ghana. He obtained 15,242 votes out of the 28,822 valid votes cast, equivalent to 52.88% of all total valid votes cast. He was elected over Boateng Fredrick of the People's National Convention, Kwadwo Owusu Agyemang of the National Democratic Congress and Josephine Ataa Oppong of the Convention People's Party. These obtained 1.00%, 43.49% and 2.63% of all total votes cast in the elections.

== Personal ==
Adjei-Yeboah is married with three children. He is a Christian (Methodist).
