= 2012–13 Lithuanian Football Cup =

2012–2013 Lithuanian Football Cup
Tournament details
- Country: Lithuania
- Teams: 62

Final positions
- Champions: Žalgiris
- Runners-up: Šiauliai

Tournament statistics
- Matches played: 32

The 2012–13 Lithuanian Football Cup was the 24th season of the Lithuanian annual football knock-out tournament. The competition started on 15 June 2012 with the matches of the first round and ended with the final on 19 May 2013, when Žalgiris Vilnius defeated FC Šiauliai in penalty kicks.

Žalgris qualified for the first qualifying round of the 2013–14 UEFA Europa League.

== First round ==
These matches were played around 15 June 2012.

Team 1	Score	Team 2
Celsis Kaunas	2–5	Lokomotyvas Radviliskis
Pionieriai Vilnius	3–2	FK Rokiskis
Peruno Vilnius	2–1	Ekrano Senjorai Panevezys
Silas Kazlu Ruda	2–1 a.e.t.	Titanas Alytus
United Kaunas	4–1	Ozo tapyrai Vilnius
GB United Vilnius	4–1	KUPSC Siauliai
FK Minija Kretinga	0–1 a.e.t.	FBK Kaunas
TEC Vilnius	0–2	Spartakas Ukmerge
Prelegentai Vilnius	6–2	Sirvinta Sirvintos
Aukstaitijos Akmenys Panevezys	1–2	Gariunai Vilnius
Rezervai Vilnius	0–1	Sveikata Kybartai
Sakuona-Klarksonas Plikiai	1–3	Aktas Vilnius
Zygis Joniskis	2–3	Ipukis Marijampole
Ozas Vilnius	4–1	Kursiai Klaipeda
Trivartis Vilnius	1–8	Bekentas Vilnius

== Second round ==
These matches were played around 8 July 2012.

Team 1	Score	Team 2
FK Palanga	1–0	Silas Kazlu Ruda
Sarema Klaipeda	3–0	Katastrofa Vilnius
Ipukis Marijampole	3–0	Pionieriai Vilnius
Bekentas Vilnius	6–1	Svyturys Marijampole
Ozas Vilnius	0–3 w/o	Granitas Vilnius
Viltis Vilnius	2–4	Ave.Ko Vilnius
United Kaunas	7–1	Rytas Vilnius
FBK Kaunas	3–6	Spyris Kaunas
Gariunai Vilnius	4–5	Lokomotyvas Radviliskis
Rinkuskiai Vilnius	1–0	Taip Vilnius
Aktas Vilnius	0–0 a.e.t. 1–3 pen	Jambo Klaipeda
Peruno Vilnius	0–0 a.e.t. 4–5 pen	Kiemas Vilnius
Sveikata Kybartai	1–5	GB United Vilnius
Rotalis Vilnius	1–2	Prelegentai Vilnius
Polonija Vilnius	4–0	Pietu IV Vilnius
Spartakas Ukmerge	4–1	Saulininkas Siauliai

== Third round ==
These matches were played between 13 and 29 August 2012.

Team 1	Score	Team 2
United Kaunas	2–1	GB United Vilnius
Lokomotyvas Radviliskis	3–5 a.e.t.	FK Palanga
Spyris Kaunas	3–0 w/o	Spartakas Ukmerge
Ipukis Marijampole	2–1	Jambo Klaipeda
Granitas Vilnius	2–1	Sarema Klaipeda
Ave.Ko Vilnius	3–2	Kiemas Vilnius
Prelegentai Vilnius	4–2 a.e.t.	Rinkuskiai Vilnius
Polonija Vilnius	3–0	Bekentas Vilnius

== Fourth round ==
These matches were played between 19 and 28 September 2012.

Team 1	Score	Team 2
FK Trakai	1–2	Venta Kursenai
Spyris Kaunas	6–2	Polonija Vilnius
Ave.Ko Vilnius	0–15	Nevėžis
FK Palanga	2–0	Ipukis Marijampole
Granitas Vilnius	3–0	United Kaunas
Atlantas	3–0	FK Kedainiai
Šilutė	2–0	Prelegentai Vilnius

== Fifth round ==
These matches were played on 22, 23 and 24 October 2012.

Team 1	Score	Team 2
Spyris Kaunas	2–3 (a.e.t.)	Šilutė
Kruoja	5–0	FK Palanga
Tauras	0–3	Žalgiris
Nevėžis	0–1	Lietava
FK Granitas Vilnius	4–0	Venta Kursenai
Dainava	0–3	Ekranas
Šiauliai	1–0	Banga
Atlantas	1–0	Sūduva

== Quarterfinals ==
These matches took place on 6 and 7 November 2012.

Team 1	Score	Team 2
FK Granitas Vilnius	1–6	Žalgiris
Kruoja	0–2	Ekranas
Atlantas	4–1 (a.e.t.)	Šilutė
Šiauliai	4–1	Lietava

== Semifinals ==
The 4 winners from the previous round entered this stage of the competition. Unlike the previous rounds of the competition, this was played over two legs. The first legs were played on 16 and 17 April 2013 and the second legs were played on 30 April and 1 May 2013.

Team 1	Agg.	Team 2	1st leg	2nd leg
Ekranas	2–4	Šiauliai	1–2	1–2
Atlantas	0–1	Žalgiris	0–0	0–1

== Final ==
19 May 2013
13:30 EEST

Žalgiris	3–3 (a.e.t.)	Šiauliai
Švrljuga 13'; Skerla 45'; Gerc 91'		Vaskėla 5'; Rašo 34'; Birškys 98'
Penalties
Švrljuga (penalty missed); Skerla (penalty scored); Gerc (penalty scored); Kuklys (penalty scored); Perić (penalty scored); Janušauskas (penalty scored); Wilk (penalty scored); Žulpa (penalty scored); Vaitkūnas (penalty scored)	8–7	(penalty scored) Rašo; (penalty missed) Tokić; (penalty scored) D. Jankauskas; (penalty scored) Žderić; (penalty scored) Vaskėla; (penalty scored) Snapkauskas; (penalty scored) Mushnikov; (penalty scored) Birškys; (penalty missed) Lunskis

S. Darius and S. Girėnas Stadium, Kaunas
Attendance: 2500
Referee: Nerijus Dunauskas
