= Benjamin Yeboah Sekyere =

Ghanaian politician (born 1977)

Hon. Benjamin Yeboah Sekyere
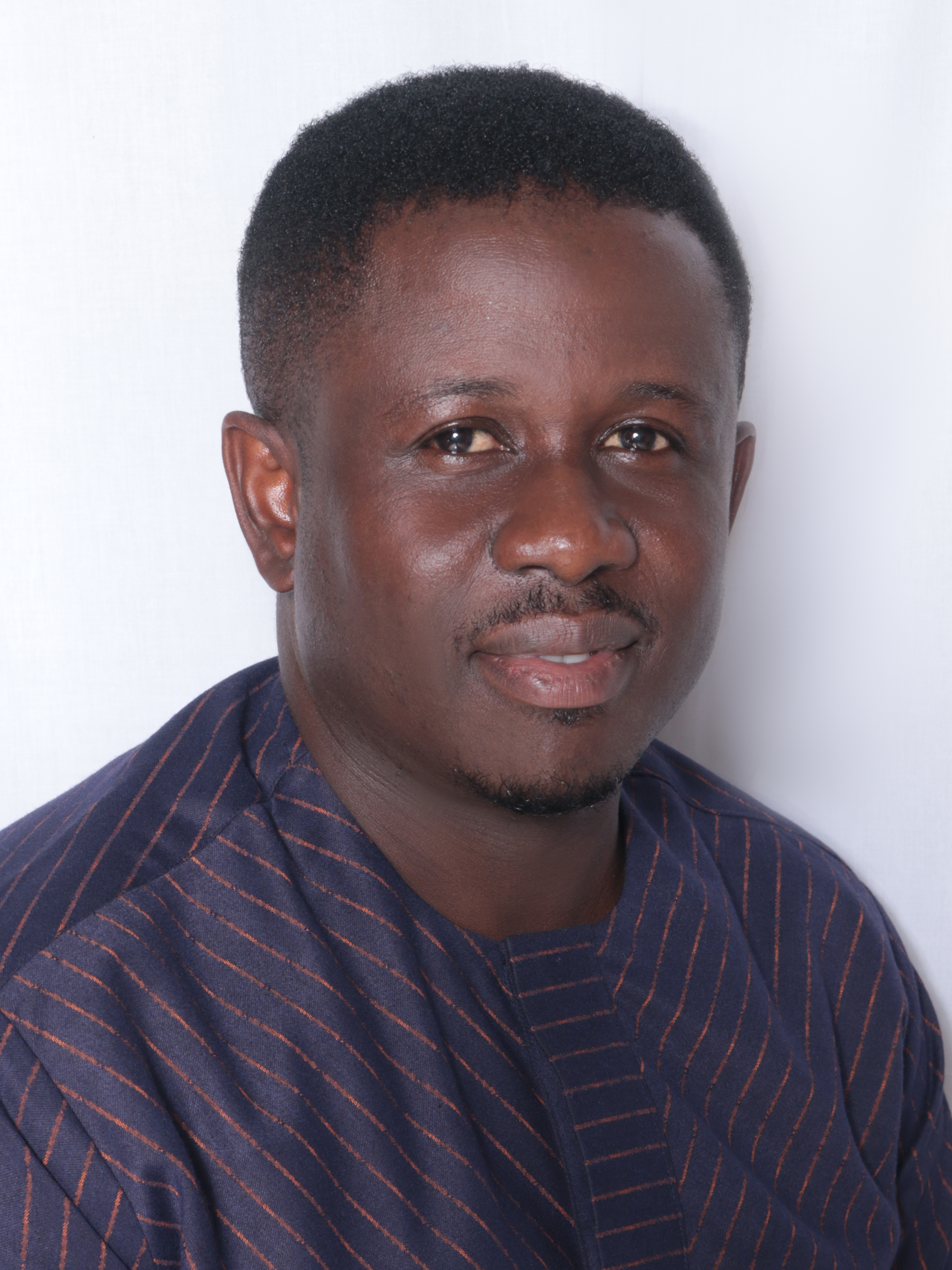

Member of Parliament for Tano South Constituency, Deputy Minister for Ahafo Region
- In office 7 January 2021 – 6 January 2025
- Succeeded by: Charles Asiedu

Personal details
- Born: Benjamin Yeboah Sekyere; 4 March 1977 (age 49) Derma, Ghana
- Party: New Patriotic Party
- Education: University of Ghana; University of Professional Studies
- Occupation: Politician
- Committees: Poverty Reduction Strategy Committee, Lands and Forestry Committee, Local Government and Rural Development Committee

Benjamin Yeboah Sekyere (born 4 March 1977) is a Ghanaian politician and was a member of the Seventh Parliament and the 8th Parliament of the Fourth Republic of Ghana, representing the Tano South Constituency in the Ahafo region on the ticket of the New Patriotic Party. He was the deputy minister of the Ahafo region.

== Early life and education ==
Sekyere was born on Friday, 4 March 1977 in Derma of the Ahafo region. He obtained a bachelor's degree in Business Administration from the University of Ghana, prior to that, he had gain a HND Accounting from the Sunyani Polytechnic. He also holds an MBA. Accounting/Finance from the University of Professional Studies.

== Professional and political career ==
He was an accountant in the Ghana Education Service. Before joining active politics, he was the principal Accountant in the Berekum Municipal Officer of the Ghana Education Service. He was re-elected in the 2020 General election to represent in the 8th Parliament of the Fourth Republic of Ghana. He won the parliamentary seat with 22,034 votes whiles Hanna Bissiw had 19,731 votes. He was the Deputy Minister for the Ahafo region in 2020.

== Personal life ==
He is married with three children. He is a Seventh-day Adventist Church.

== Politics ==
Sekyere is a member of the New Patriotic Party, representing the Tano South constituency in the Ahafo Region in the Seventh and Eighth Parliament of the Fourth Republic of Ghana.

=== 2016 election ===
Sekyere first contested the Tano South constituency on the ticket of the New Patriotic Party during the 2016 Ghanaian general election and won with 21,018 votes representing 54.62% of the total votes. He won the election over Hanna Louisa Bisiw of the National Democratic Congress who polled 17,215 votes which is equivalent to 44.73%, parliamentary candidate for Progressive People's Party Timothy Anabila had 224 votes representing 0.58% and the parliamentary candidate for the Convention People's Party Addai Mununkum had 26 votes representing 0.07% of the total votes.

==== 2020 election ====
Hon. Sekyere was re- elected as a member of parliament for Tano South on the ticket of New Patriotic Party during the 2020 Ghanaian general election. He was elected with 22,034 votes representing 52.8% over the parliamentary candidate for the National Democratic Congress Hanna Louisa Bisiw who pulled 19, 731 votes which is equivalent to 47.2% of the total votes.

===== 2024 election =====
Hothe Tano South (Ghana parliament constituency) on the ticket of New Patriotic Party during the 2024 Ghanaian general election and lost the election to Charles Asiedu with 19,061 which is equivalent to 48.27%.

== Committees ==
He was part of the Works and Housing Committee and also the Poverty Reduction Strategy Committee. He was the ranking member for the Poverty Reduction Strategy Committee, also a member of the Lands and Forestry Committee and also Local Government and Rural Development Committee.

== Philanthropy ==
In 2018, he donated a school bus to the Samuel Otu Senior High School. He also gave 20 laptops to some SHS and about 871 uniforms to schools in Tano South.
