= Serwaa Kesse Girls' Senior High School =

Female public school in Duayaw Nkwanta, Ghana

Coordinates: 7.189°N 2.097°W

- Duayaw Nkwanta, Ahafo Region; Ghana

Information
- Type: secondary/high school,
- Established: 1965 (61 years ago)
- School code: 0060203
- Grades: Forms [1-3]

Serwaa Kesse Girls' Senior High School is a female public school located in Duayaw Nkwanta in the Tano North Municipal District in the Ahafo Region of Ghana. In September 2022, they emerged as winners in the 2022 National Business Pitch Competition which was held in Accra.

In 2019, the school took part in the qualifying stage of the National Science and Math Quiz.

== History ==
The school was established in 1965 initially as a Women's Training College by Kwame Nkrumah. On 15 August 1970, it was changed into a mixed public secondary school and named as Duayaw Nkwanta Secondary School. Finally in 2003, it was converted into a female senior high and renamed into its current name. The school was named after the First Queen mother of the Duayaw-Nkwanta Traditional Area.

== Junior Achievement award ==
In 2022, the school took part in the National Business Pitch Competition organized by the Junior Achievement Ghana. It was hosted by the Academic City University College in Accra. The competition brought together 16 schools across Ghana. Serwaa Kesse Girls' Senior High School emerged the winner.

== Achievements ==
- 2016 National Debate Champions
- Ahafo regional Soccer and Volleyball champions
- Handball 2012-2016

== Philanthropy ==
In March 2018, the management and students of the school donated assorted items to the inmates of the Sunyani Female Prisons. They presented items such as biscuits, detergents, bags of rice, sanitary pads, clothing, sugar and cooking oil.

== School Courses ==
- Agriculture
- Business
- Home Economics
- General Arts
- General Science
- Visual Arts

== School Facilities ==
- Class Rooms
- Science Lab
- Library
- Dining Hall
- Dormitory Block

== Former headteachers ==
- In 2013, the headmistress of the school was Doris Bainn.
- In 2018, the headmistress of the school was Doris Cobbinah.
