= Dwommo =

- Village
- Location in Ghana
- Coordinates: 7°9′6″N 2°2′45″W
- Country: Ghana
- District: Tana South
- Region: Ahafo

Area
  - Total: 0.68 km^{2} (0.26 sq mi)
- Elevation: 296 m (971 ft)
- Time zone: UTC+0 (GMT)

Dwommo is a town situated on a main road in Tano South Municipal District, Ahafo Region, Ghana. Dwommo has a memorial park and a supermarket. According to a study, the agriculturally employed population of Dwommo was asked on their subjective wealth in relation to their livestock, and they considered themselves wealthy.
