= Dominic Yaw Amoako =

Ghanaian politician

Mp for Tano North constituency
- President: Jerry John Rawlings
- Parliamentary group: National Democratic Congress

Personal details
- Born: 10 April 1950, Terchire, Ghana.
- Education: Acherensua Senior High School Advance Teachers' Training College
- Occupation: Teacher

Dominic Yaw Amoako is a Ghanaian politician and a member of the 1st Parliament of the 4th republic of Ghana representing Tano North constituency under the membership of the National Democratic Congress.

== Early life and education ==
Dominic was born in Terchire, in the Ahafo Region of Ghana on 10 April 1950. He had his secondary school education at Acherensua Senior High School and obtained his Teachers' Training Certificate at Teachers' Training College and thereafter proceeded to Advanced Teacher Training College where he obtained his Diploma in English.

== Politics ==
Dominic was elected into the first parliament of the fourth republic of Ghana on 7 January 1993 after he was pronounced winner at the 1992 Ghanaian parliamentary election held on 29 December 1992. He lost his ticket to his party comrade Felix Boakye who became the candidate for the 1996 Ghanaian General elections but lost the election to the New Patriotic Party member Joe Donkor. Donkor defeated Felix by claiming 39.40% of the total valid votes cast which was equivalent to 12,010 votes while Felix obtained 38.20% of the total valid votes cast which was equivalent to 11,634 votes.

== Personal life ==
Dominic is a Christian.
