= Ludwig Ernstsson =

Swedish footballer and manager

Personal information
- Date of birth: 29 April 1972 (age 54)
- Place of birth: Växjö, Sweden
- Height: 1.86 m (6 ft 1 in)
- Position: Striker

Youth career
- 1987–1992: Öster

Senior career*
Years	Team	Apps	(Gls)
1992–1996	Öster		
1997–1998	Kongsvinger	38	(10)
1998–2000	Austria Wien	28	(4)
2000–2003	Öster		

Managerial career
- 2009–2010: Öster (assistant)
- 2010: Öster (head coach July–September)
- * Club domestic league appearances and goals

Ludwig Ernstsson (born 29 April 1972) is a Swedish retired football striker.

He grew up in both Räppe and Ör, since his parents were separated. He joined Östers IF, made his senior debut in 1992 and joined Kongsvinger IL in 1997. Here he scored ten Norwegian Premier League goals in 1997 and 1998. In the middle of the season he left Kongsvinger for Austria Wien. He stayed here until 2000, when he returned to Öster.

After retiring he became a youth coach. In 2009, he was promoted to assistant coach for the senior team. In July 2010 he was promoted to head coach, only to be replaced two months later - following a six-game losing streak - by Hans Gren. Another two months later, on 10 November, it was announced that Ernstsson and Öster parted ways for the time being.
