= Freda Akosua Prempeh =

Ghanaian politician

Hon Dr. Freda Prempeh MP
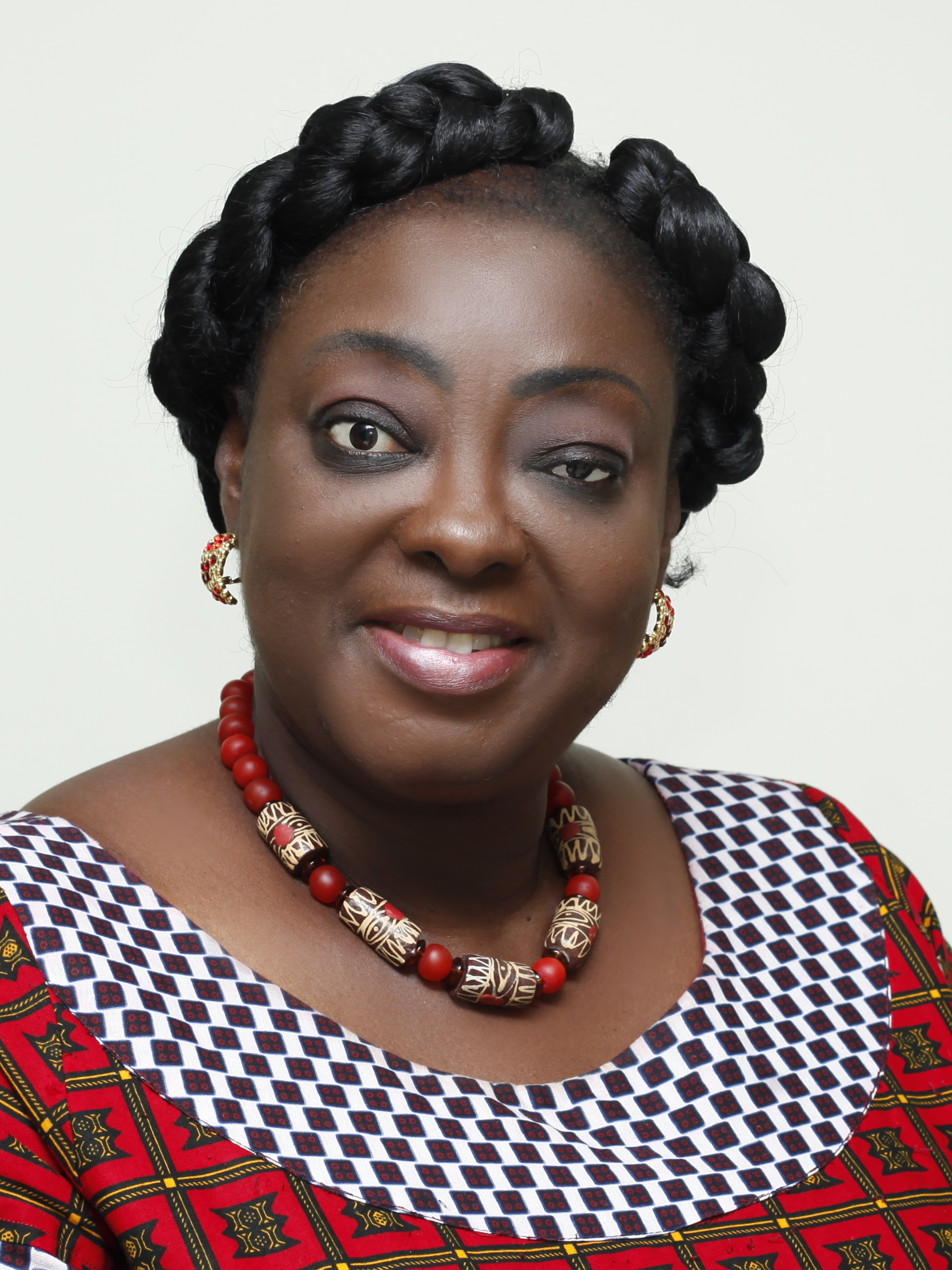

Member of the Ghana Parliament for Tano North
- In office 7 January 2013 – 6 January 2024
- Succeeded by: Gideon Boako

Personal details
- Born: Freda; 23 January 1966 (age 60) Duayaw-Nkwanta, Ahafo Region, Ghana
- Party: New Patriotic Party
- Spouse: Separated
- Education: University of Ghana
- Occupation: Politician
- Profession: Public Relations and Marketing Executive
- Committees: Committee on Government Assurances, Health
- Portfolio: Deputy Minister of Gender, Children and Social Protection.

Freda Akosua Oheneafrewo Prempeh (born 23 January 1966) is a Ghanaian politician, and Member of Parliament in the Seventh Parliament and Eighth Parliament of the fourth republic of Ghana representing Tano North Constituency in the Ahafo Region, Ghana. She was the Minister of State, for the Ministry of works and housing, Ghana and previously served as the Deputy Gender Minister and also Assembly member – "Assembly Woman" from 2002 to 2010 for the Lakoo Electoral Area of the La-Dadekotopo Constituency in the Greater Accra Region.

In 2017, she was appointed chairperson of an 11-member local organising committee tasked to organise the 2018 African Women Cup of Nations.

== Early life and education ==
She was born on 23 January 1966 in Accra to a Ghanaian Royal family. She is the third daughter of the late Ohenenana Akwasi Agyeman Dua-Prempeh, of the Ashanti Royal Family and the late Nana Amma Serwaa, Kontihemaa of Duayaw Nkwanta( known in private life as Madam Georgina Ansah).

Freda started her basic education at University Primary School, Kumasi and furthered with her Ordinary(O) level at Technology Secondary School (now KNUST Senior High School) in Kumasi, Ghana and continued with her Advanced level Certificate (A level) at the Accra Workers College in Accra, Ghana. She then proceeded to the Ghana Institute of Journalism, where she pursued a Diploma in Public Relations and Advertising. She was honored a Certified Public Accountant by Ghana Institute of Management and Public Administration in 1998. She holds both a Certificate and an Advanced Certificate in Marketing, DipM, MCIM, Chartered Marketer Professional Postgraduate Diploma in Marketing, all from the Chartered Institute of Marketing, United Kingdom. She obtained her degree in (Business Administration), Human Resource Management Option from the University of Ghana in 2006. She also studied MA Comms, Media and Public Relations at the University of Leicester, UK and also has a PhD in Business Administration from the Ghana Technology University College.

== Personal life ==
Freda Akosua Prempeh hails from Duayaw Nkwanta, the capital of her parliamentary Constituency, Tano North, in the Ahafo Region, Ghana. She is a Christian, and is married with a son.

Freda almost lost her life to the June 3, 2015 flood and fire disaster at circle, Accra.

Prior to Freda's election into office as a Member in parliament in 2013, she was a manageress at the Point Four Hotel in Sunyani and had also worked with Prison Service for 10 years.

== Political life ==
Freda Prempeh belongs to the New Patriotic Party (N.P.P.). Her political career started back in 2002, as an Assembly member for the Lakoo Electoral Area of the La-Dadekotopo Constituency in the Greater Accra Region, for 8 years, In February 2006, she was called to serve on the National Reconciliation Commission as a Public Affairs Officer for a period of 9 months. She's is currently the member of Parliament for Tano North Constituency, and serves on the Mines and Energy, Government Assurance Committee in parliament. She was appointed the Deputy Minister of Works and Housing, in 2017 by President Akufo-Addo. On February 14, 2024, she was relieved from office as the minister of Sanitation and Water Resources.

She contested in the 2020 Ghanaian general election as the parliamentary candidate for the Tano North seat on the ticket of New Patriotic Party and won by more than 51%. This makes it her 3rd term as an MP and now a member of the 8th parliament of the Fourth Republic.

In the parliamentary primaries of 2024 for the NPP, she was defeated in her attempt to represent the party by Dr. Gideon Boako, Spokesperson for the Vice President and NPP flagbearer, Dr. Mahamudu Bawumia. Boako secured 444 votes, surpassing his opponent who received 221 votes out of the total valid votes cast.

== Leadership positions held ==
- 2004–2008 Member, Governing Council, – Local Government Service Council
- 2005–2008 Member – National Media Commission
- 2005–2008 Board Member – National Health Insurance Scheme, Kpeshie Sub- Metro, Accra
- 2002–2006 Chairperson, Development Sub-Committee (Accra Metropolitan Assembly)
- 2006–2008 Chairperson, Women & Children Sub-Committee (Accra Metropolitan Assembly)
- 2006/2007 Founding Member and Vice President, Tertiary Students Academic Year Confederacy (TESCON), University of Ghana, Accra City Campus
- 2008 Member, Communication Committee. New Patriotic Party, National Campaign Team
- President and Founder, Women Supporters Union of Ghana

== Membership of professional bodies ==
- 31 October 2003 to date Institute of Public Relations (IPR, Ghana) – Accredited Member.
- October 2000 – October 2003 Institute of Public Relations (IPR) Ghana – Associate Member
- Ghana Journalists Association (GJA) – Affiliate Member
