= Techimantia =

- Town
- Location within Ghana
- Coordinates: 7°10′N 2°01′W
- Country: Ghana
- Region: Ahafo Region
- District: Tano South Municipal District
- Time zone: GMT
  - Summer (DST): GMT

Techimantia is a town located in the Tano South Municipal District in the Ahafo Region of Ghana. It's about 14 km away from Bechem which is the District Capital.

According to oral history, settlements of Techimantia began by hunters who were stationed in that section of the forest to hunt for elephant for its ivory to the then Asantehene.

Techimantia is noted for the Samuel Otoo Senior High School.

== Economy ==
The economy of Techimantia is predominated by agricultural farming. Tomatoes shipped to many parts of Ghana are produced here.
