= Daniel Ask =

Swedish footballer (born 1998)

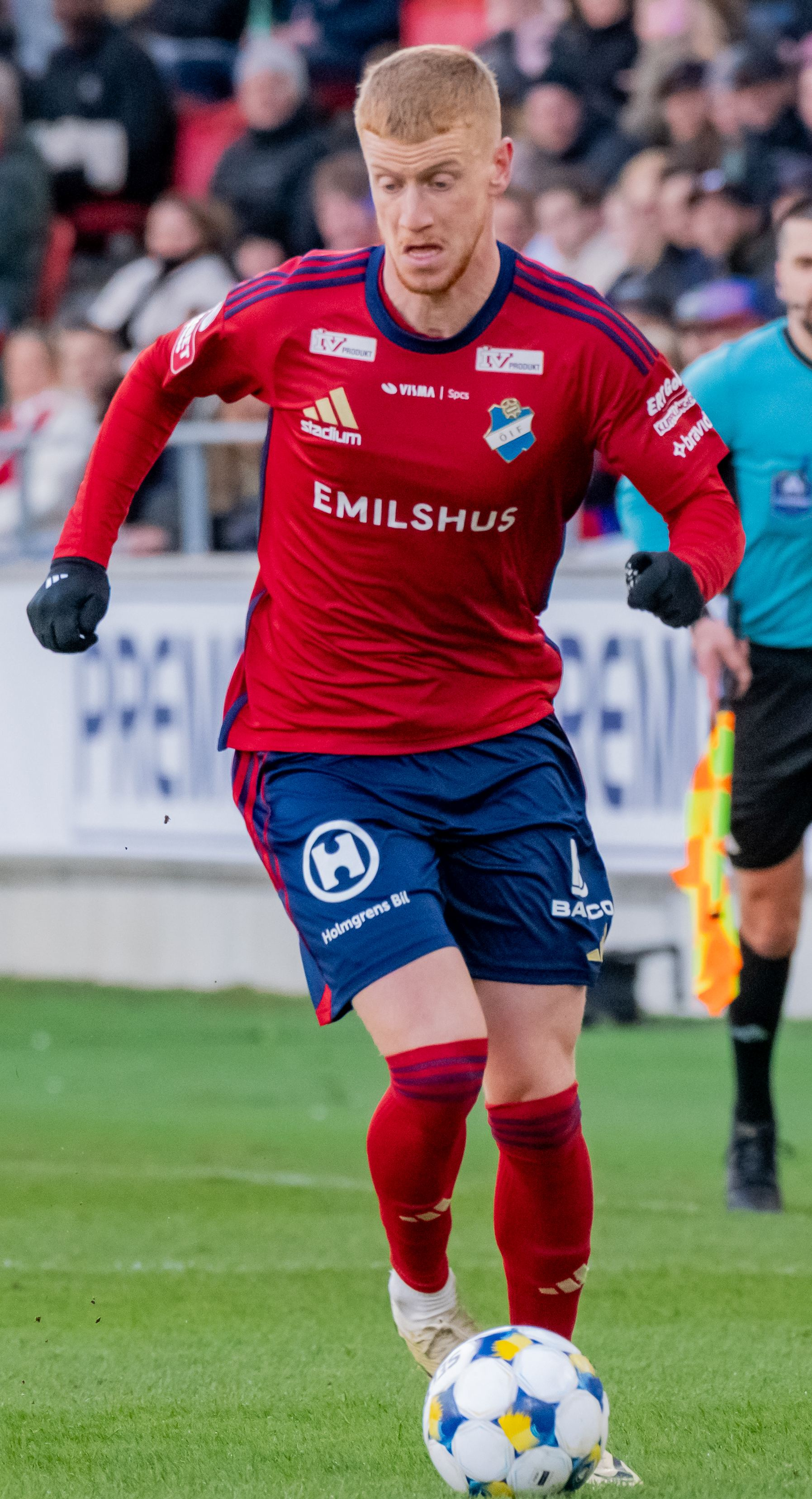

Personal information
- Full name: Nils Daniel Erik Ask
- Date of birth: 20 December 1998 (age 27)
- Place of birth: Malmö, Sweden
- Height: 1.92 m (6 ft 4 in)
- Position: Midfielder

Team information
- Current team: Östers IF
- Number: 8

Youth career
- Malmö FF
- LB07
- 2016: Östers IF
- 2017: Landskrona BoIS
- 2017: IFK Värnamo

Senior career*
Years	Team	Apps	(Gls)
2015	IFK Osby	9	(0)
2016	Östers IF	4	(0)
2017	Landskrona BoIS	3	(0)
2018–2020	IFK Värnamo	26	(1)
2020	LB07	10	(2)
2021	Skövde AIK	26	(3)
2022–2023	Västerås SK	57	(2)
2024–2025	AaB	11	(0)
2024	→ Västerås SK (loan)	18	(0)
2025–	Östers IF	48	(0)
- * Club domestic league appearances and goals as of 12 November 2026

Nils Daniel Erik Ask (born 20 December 1998) is a Swedish footballer who plays as a midfielder for Östers IF.

== Career ==
Ask is a product of Malmö FF. Later in his youth, he moved to Limhamn Bunkeflo. The 2015 season was spent in the town of Osby, where he played both at an academy called 'Calcio' and for the local club IFK Osby, which played in the Swedish Division 3. On April 13, 2016, Ask was signed by Östers IF. Ask played for both the club's U-19 team and the first team.

Already in December 2016 18-year old Ask switched clubs again when he signed a three-year deal with Landskrona BoIS. Here Ask also played both U19 and first team football.

In August 2017, Ask was signed by IFK Värnamo, where he would initially be part of the U19 squad. Ahead of the 2018 season, Ask was promoted to the first team. In May 2020, Ask left the club after a period of injury problems.

In June 2020, Ask joined his former club, Division 2 club LB07. In January 2022, Ask was signed by Västerås SK, where he signed a two-year contract. During his time at Västerås SK, Ask was named 2023 Superettan Midfielder of the Year and was an important part of the team in the club's 2023 season, which ended with promotion to the 2024 Allsvenskan.

In December 2023, Ask was signed by newly relegated Danish 1st Division side AaB, where he signed a 3.5-year contract. In June 2024 during the Allsvenskan break, Västerås SK announced that Ask would re-join the club on loan for the remainder of the Allsvenskan season. He returned to AaB after the loan spell.

On January 22, 2025, AaB confirmed that the parties had terminated the contract by mutual agreement.

On January 25, 2025, it was confirmed that Ask was moving to his former club, Östers IF, who had just been promoted to 2025 Allesvenskan.
