= Tatu Varmanen =

Finnish football player (born 1998)

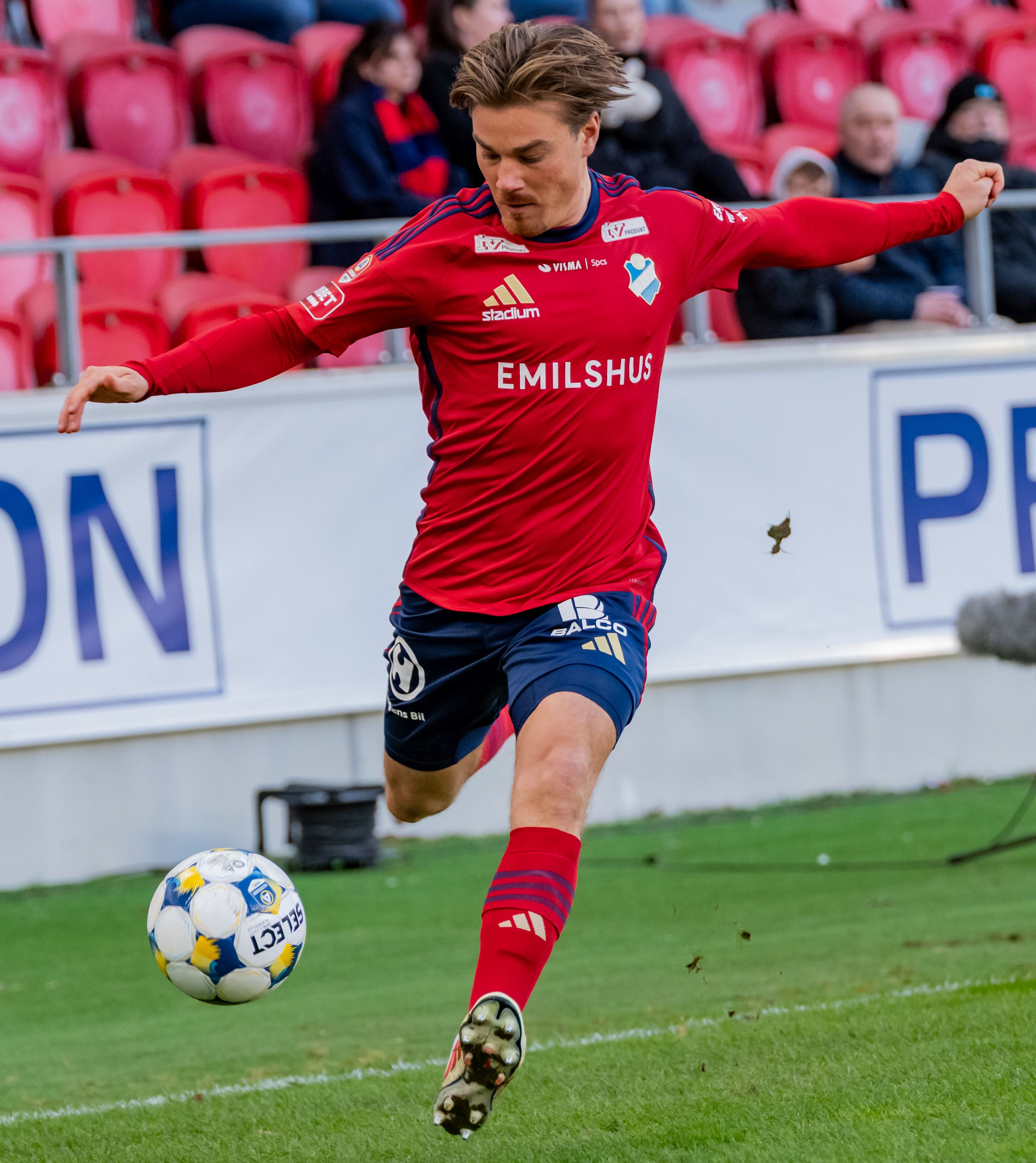
- Varmanen with Öster in 2025

Personal information
- Full name: Tatu Valdemar Varmanen
- Date of birth: 9 July 1998 (age 28)
- Place of birth: Sweden
- Height: 1.78 m (5 ft 10 in)
- Position: Right-back

Team information
- Current team: Östers IF
- Number: 15

Youth career
- –2016: Brommapojkarna

Senior career*
Years	Team	Apps	(Gls)
2016–2017	Brommapojkarna	1	(0)
2017–2018	Inter Turku	31	(0)
2017	→ JJK (loan)	0	(0)
2019–2020	TPS	38	(0)
2021–2025	Östers IF	108	(2)
2026–	Östers IF	15	(0)

International career^{‡}
2015–2016	Finland U18	7	(0)
2016–2017	Finland U19	4	(0)
- * Club domestic league appearances and goals as of 12 November 2026 ‡ National team caps and goals as of 28 March 2017

Tatu Valdemar Varmanen (born 9 July 1998) is a professional footballer who plays for Swedish club Östers IF. Born in Sweden, he has represented Finland at youth level.

== Club career ==
=== Brommapojkarna ===
A product of Brommapojkarna's youth academy, Varmanen made his league debut for the club on 17 April 2016 in a 2–0 home victory over Piteå, coming on as an 80th-minute substitute for Nemrut Awrohum.

=== Inter Turku ===
In March 2017, Varmanen moved to Veikkausliiga side Inter Turku, before being sent on loan to JJK. He made his league debut for the club on 4 August 2017 in a 3–0 home victory over HIFK.

=== TPS ===
In March 2019, Varmanen signed with Ykkönen club TPS on a one-year deal. After making his debut on matchday one against MYPA, Varmanen would make 20 appearances in all competitions for the club in 2019 as TPS gained promotion to the Veikkausliiga. In October, he signed a one-year contract extension.

=== Östers IF ===
Following four seasons in Finland, Varmanen returned to his native Sweden, signing with Östers IF. He made his debut for Öster on 11 April 2021 playing full 90 minutes in a match against Örgryte. In March 2022, he signed a two-year contract extension with the club. After Öster had won the promotion to Allsvenskan at the end of 2024, Varmanen extended his contract with the club in late November 2024. He left the club af the end of 2025, however he re-joined Östers IF again in June 2026.

== International career ==
Varmanen has represented both Finland U-18 and Finland U-19.

== Personal life ==
Born in Sweden to Finnish parents, Varmanen spent the majority of his childhood in Stockholm. His mother is from Tornio and father from Lahti. He holds a dual Finnish-Swedish citizenship.

== Career statistics ==
=== Club ===
As of 13 April 2025

Appearances and goals by club, season and competition
Club	Season	League			Cup (Note: Includes Suomen Cup and Svenska Cupen)		Continental		Total	
Club	Season	Division	Apps	Goals	Apps	Goals	Apps	Goals	Apps	Goals
Brommapojkarna	2016	Ettan	1	0	1	0	—		2	0
Inter Turku	2017	Veikkausliiga	14	0	0	0	—		14	0
Inter Turku	2018	Veikkausliiga	17	0	6	0	—		23	0
Inter Turku	Total		31	0	6	0	0	0	37	0
JJK (loan)	2017	Veikkausliiga	0	0	1	0	—		1	0
TPS	2019	Ykkönen	18	0	2	0	—		20	0
TPS	2020	Veikkausliiga	20	0	7	0	—		27	0
TPS	Total		38	0	9	0	0	0	47	0
Öster	2021	Superettan	26	2	4	0	—		30	2
Öster	2022	Superettan	24	1	3	1	—		27	1
Öster	2023	Superettan	10	0	0	0	—		10	0
Öster	2024	Superettan	25	0	2	0	–		27	0
Öster	2025	Allsvenskan	2	0	2	0	–		4	0
Öster	Total		87	3	9	1	0	0	96	4
Career total			157	3	26	1	0	0	183	4

== Honours ==
Östers IF

- Superettan runner-up: 2024

Inter Turku

- Finnish Cup: 2017–18
