= Gideon Boako =

Ghanaian politician and economist

Hon. Gideon Boako MP

Member of Parliament for Tano North Constituency
- Incumbent
- Assumed office 7 January 2025
- Preceded by: Freda Prempeh
- President: John Mahama
- Vice President: Jane Naana Opoku-Agyemang

Personal details
- Born: 16 December 1983 (age 42)
- Party: New Patriotic Party
- Education: Kwame Nkrumah University of Science and Technology, Columbia University, University of Witwatersrand
- Profession: Politician, financial economist

Gideon Boako (born 16 December 1983) is a Ghanaian financial economist and politician. He is the member of parliament for the Tano North (Ghana parliament constituency) in the Ahafo Region of Ghana. He represents the constituency in the 9th Parliament of the Fourth Republic of Ghana as a member of the New Patriotic Party (NPP).

== Early life and education ==
Gideon holds a Ph.D. in finance, specializing in financial economics, from the University of Witwatersrand. He also earned two master's degrees in finance, an M.Phil. and an MBA, from the Kwame Nkrumah University of Science and Technology (KNUST). Additionally, Gideon is a Charter Holder in Financial Economics (Ch.FE). He completed certificate programs in Financial Engineering and Risk Management from Columbia University and in Financial Markets from Yale University.

== Career ==
Gideon Boako currently serves on Ghana's Economic Management Team (EMT) as a technical advisor at the Office of the president and as the spokesperson to the vice president of Ghana. He is a member of the New Patriotic Party and currently the member of parliament-elect for the Tano North (Ghana parliament constituency) in the Ahafo Region of Ghana.

== Politics ==
On January 27, 2024, Boako emerged victorious in Tano North New Patriotic Party parliamentary primaries by securing 444 votes against the incumbent Freda Prempeh who had 221 votes. The victory guaranteed him to contest on the tick of the NPP in the 2024 parliamentary election.

In December 2024, he contested in the Ghanaian general elections for member of parliament in the Tano North (Ghana parliament constituency). Boako secured 21,127 votes, defeating his sole opponent, Pious Opoku of the National Democratic Congress (NDC).

== Personal life ==
On January 21, 2023, Gideon Boako married Belinda. He was born December 16, 1983. He studied at Kwame Nkrumah University of Science and Technology, where he did his BSC in the year 06–2008, MBA in the year 05-2014 MPhil in the year 12–2012.
