= Hanna Louisa Bissiw =

Ghanaian politician (born 1972)

Hanna Louisa Bisiw
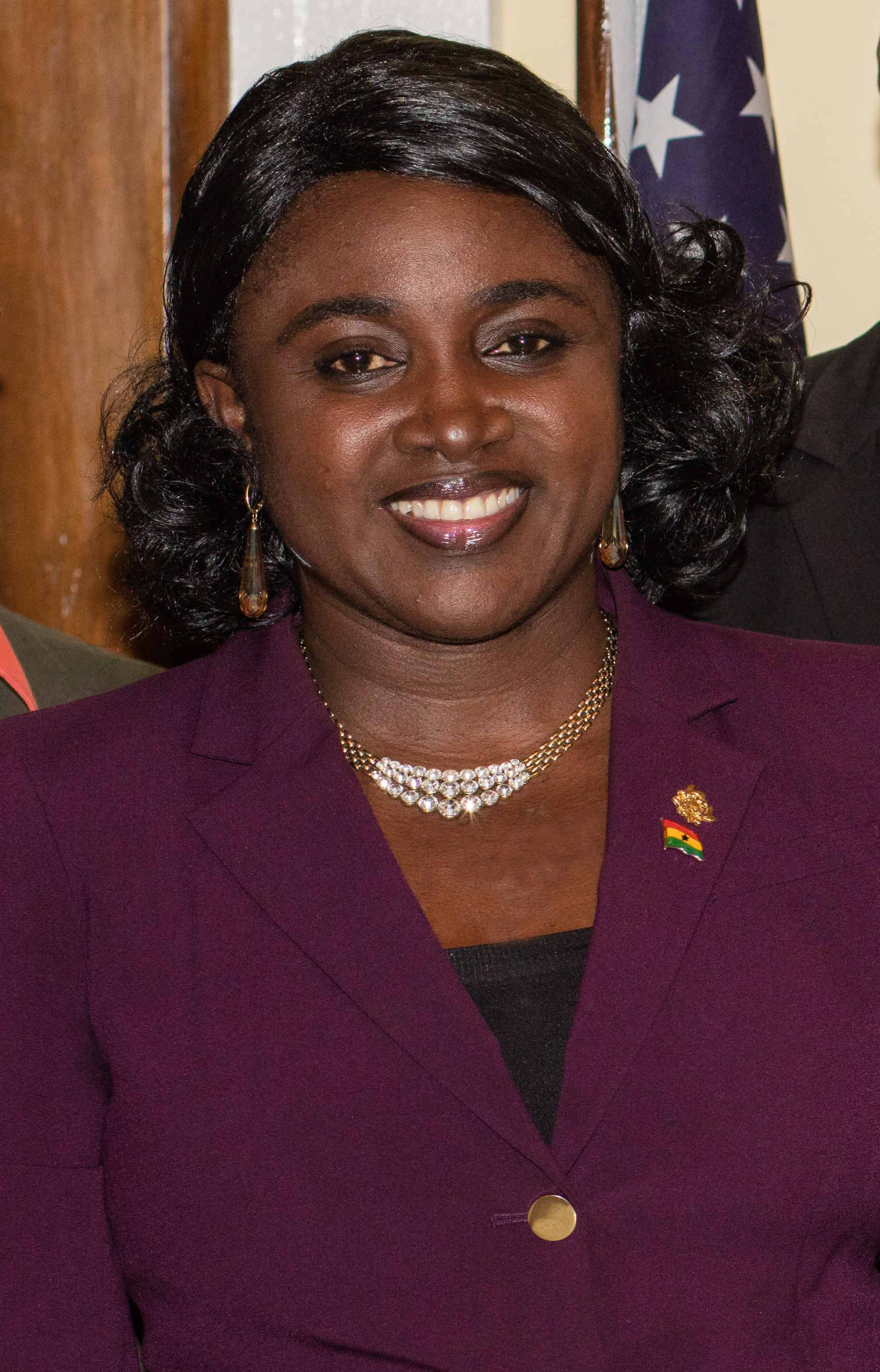

Member of Parliament for Tano South Constituency
- In office 2013–2017

Deputy Minister for Food and Agriculture
- In office 2013–2017
- President: John Dramani Mahama

Deputy Minister for Water Resources, Works and Housing
- In office 2009–2013
- President: John Atta Mills

Personal details
- Born: 23 July 1972 (age 54) Techimantia, Brong Ahafo
- Party: National Democratic Congress
- Spouse: N/A
- Children: 2
- Education: Kumasi Girls Senior High School
- Profession: Veterinary Doctor

Hanna Louisa Bissiw (born 23 July 1972) Is a Ghanaian politician who is a former Deputy Minister of Food and Agriculture and also a former Member of Parliament for Tano South, Brong Ahafo Region Ghana.

She is a member and the National Women's Organizer of the National Democratic Congress in Ghana.

== Early life and education ==
Dr.Hanna Louisa Bisiw was born in Techimantia in the Brong Ahafo Region of Ghana. She received her senior high-school education at Kumasi Girls Secondary School, and later acquired a scholarship to study in Cuba, where she graduated as a Veterinary Doctor (1999).

== Career ==
Upon returning to Ghana, Bissiw worked with Veterinary Hospitals and also collaborated projects between Ghana and Cuba. In 2008, she became active in politics. She rose from being a member of the NDC Manifesto Committee (2008) to become the Deputy Minister of State (Ministry of Water Resources, Works and Housing (MWRWH) (2009), Deputy Minister of Food and Agriculture and also Member of Parliament for Tano South (2012 – 2017).

== Corruption allegations ==
Hanna Bissiw has come under public criticism in the past years over allegations of living a lavish lifestyle at the expense of state resources.

In 2010, the Daily Searchlight reported an undercover investigation suggesting that she was the owner of a multi-bedroom double mansion being put up at Techimantia, her hometown in the Brong Ahafo region of Ghana.

In 2014, Daily Guide published details of her birthday celebration where she was given a new Toyota Land Cruiser Prado worth $120,000. The paper describing the occasion as a "mega party". She responded that the car was a birthday present from her wealthy husband.

== 2016 Elections ==
Hanna Bissiw lost her parliamentary seat of the Tano South Constituency in the Brong Ahafo Region on the ticket of the National Democratic Congress in the 2016 parliamentary elections. It was alleged by some of her constituents that after losing her seat she made efforts to retrieve hospital supplies she had earlier donated to a hospital in her constituency. She denied the allegation citing that her intention was misconstrued by the report.

== Personal life ==
Hanna Bissiw has two children.
