= SK Roudnice nad Labem =

Roudnice nad Labem
- Full name: SK Roudnice nad Labem
- Founded: 1907
- Ground: Stadion Pod Lipou
- Capacity: 6,000
- Chairman: Pavel Dohnal
- Manager: Marián Řízek
- League: I. A třída, Ústecký kraj (level 6)
- 2022–23: 7th
- Website: www.skroudnice.cz
Home colours

SK Roudnice nad Labem is a Czech football club located in Roudnice nad Labem in the Ústí nad Labem Region. It currently plays in the I. A třída, Ústecký kraj (level 6), which is in the sixth tier of Czech football. Since 2011, Roudnice has been a farm team for Czech First League side FK Teplice.

== History ==
The club was promoted to the Bohemian Football League in 2011 after finishing second in Divize B in the Czech Fourth Division. Champions SK Viktorie Jirny decided not to promote.

=== Historical names ===
- 1907 – SK Roudnice nad Labem
- 1948 – Sokol Roudnice nad Labem
- 19?? – ZSJ Benzina Roudnice nad Labem
- 1953 – TJ Slavoj SKP Roudnice nad Labem
- 19?? – TJ Slavoj OKP Roudnice nad Labem
- 19?? – TJ Spartak Roudnice nad Labem
- 1990 – SK Roudnice nad Labem

== Current squad ==
Note: Flags indicate national team as defined under FIFA eligibility rules; some limited exceptions apply. Players may hold more than one non-FIFA nationality.

No.	Pos.	Nation	Player
1	GK	CZE	Richard Brauneis
5	DF	CZE	Michal Obrtlík
6	MF	CZE	Radek Cibulka
8	MF	CRO	Marko Rašo
9	MF	CZE	Tomáš Kuchař
11	FW	CZE	Radek Bukač
12	DF	CZE	Vít Kala
13	DF	CZE	Lukáš Brhlík
14	FW	CZE	Václav Laušman
15	FW	CZE	Karel Mikas
17	MF	CZE	Martin Medek

No.	Pos.	Nation	Player
18	GK	CZE	Martin Cvrkal
19	DF	CZE	Jan Lukášek
20	MF	CZE	Petr Gutheis
21	DF	CZE	Tomáš Kučera
22	FW	CZE	Petr Vobořil
23	DF	CZE	Jakub Pícha
24	DF	CZE	Lukáš Vaněk
25	FW	CZE	David Brandejs
24	MF	GHA	Eric Adjei
27	FW	CZE	Martin Pohořelý
30	GK	CZE	Tomáš Kysela
