= Agyei =

Agyei is a surname common in the African nation of Ghana, especially among the Akan. Notable people with the surname include:

- Dan Agyei (born 1997), English professional footballer
- Daniel Agyei (born 1989), Ghanaian footballer
- Daniel Kofi Agyei (born 1992), Ghanaian footballer
- William Kwabena Antwi Agyei (or Will Antwi) (born 1982), Ghanaian-English footballer
- Nicholas Anane-Agyei, Ghanaian politician

== See also ==
- Adjei
