= Östers IF =

Association football club in Sweden

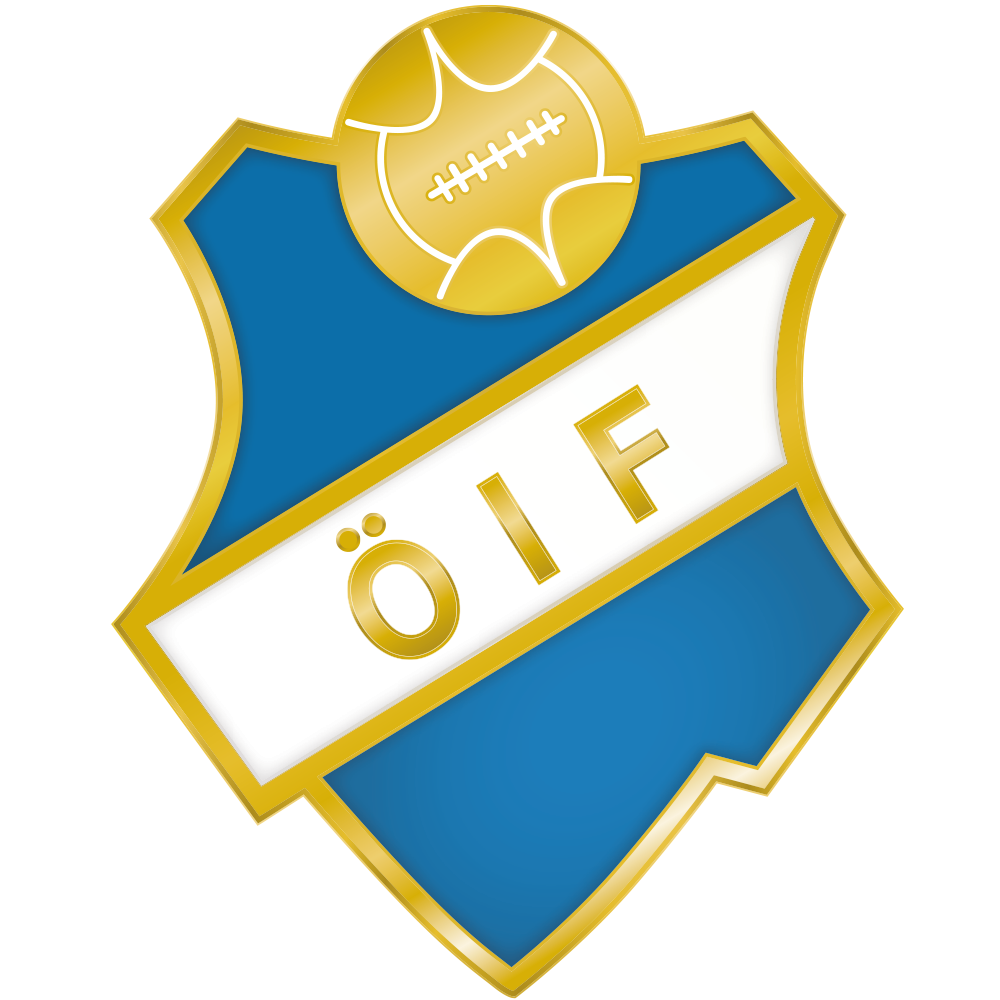
- Full name: Östers Idrottsförening
- Founded: 20 April 1930; 96 years ago
- Ground: Spiris Arena, Växjö
- Capacity: 12,000
- Chairman: Jonas Karlsson
- Head coach: Roberth Björknesjö
- League: Superettan
- 2025: Allsvenskan, 15th of 16 ▼ (relegated)
- Website: www.ostersif.se
Home colours	Away colours

Östers Idrottsförening, commonly known as Östers IF or simply Öster, is a Swedish sports club located in Växjö, specializing in football. Östers will be relegated from Allsvenskan to Superettan in 2025. They were promoted from Superettan in 2024 and were relegated during their first season in a long time in Allsvenskan.

The club has previously also competed in ice hockey (see separate article), bandy, and bowling. Öster was formed on 20 April 1930 as Östers Fotbollförening, before adopting the name "Östers IF" in 1932. The club is affiliated to the Smålands Fotbollförbund.

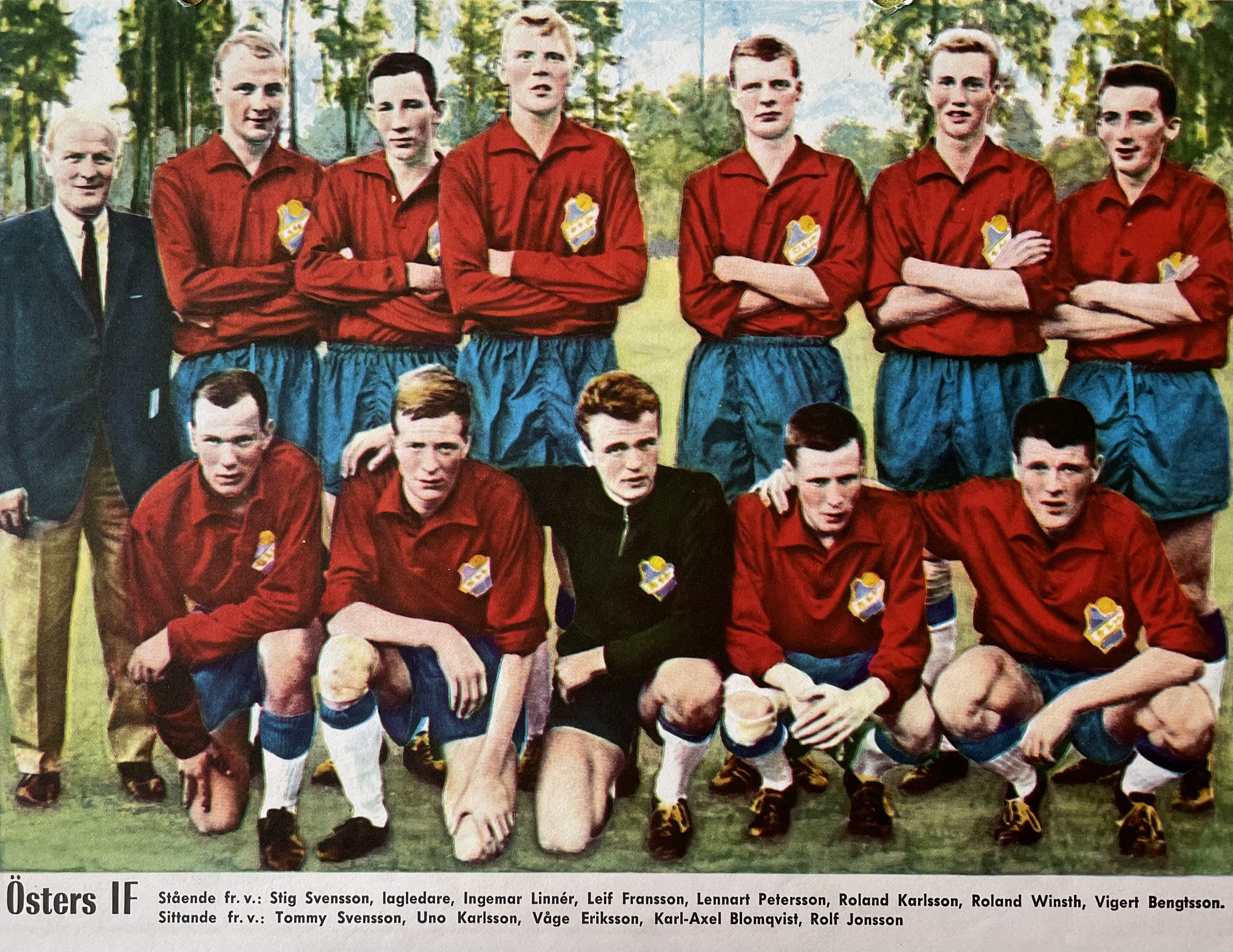
Östers IF in 1964.

In 1968, their first season in Allsvenskan, Öster became the first team ever to win the national title at their first attempt (newly promoted IF Elfsborg won the league in 1961 but had played in, and been winners of, the championship in the past). This win ignited the team's 'golden age' which lasted until the early 1980s and saw them win a total of four Swedish championships.

On 31 March 2011, Öster broke ground on their new arena, Myresjöhus Arena, which was inaugurated in August 2012. The arena hosted four games of the UEFA Women's Euro 2013 tournament.

== History ==
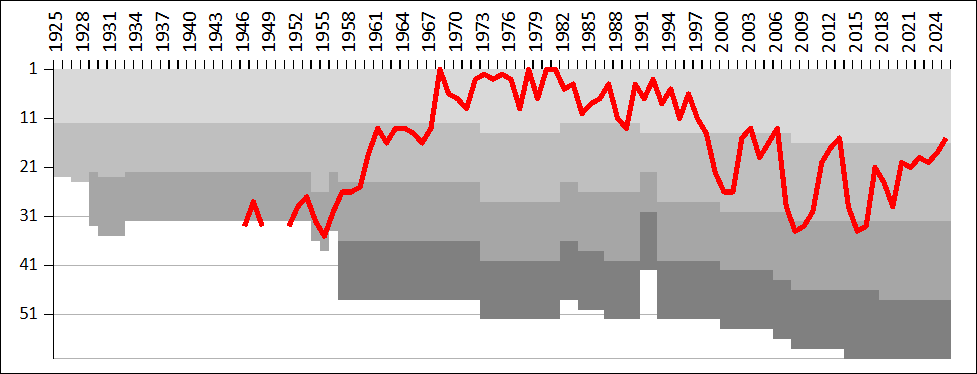
A chart showing the progress of Östers IF through the Swedish football league system. The different shades of gray represent league divisions.

Öster (English: "East") was named after a district in the city of Växjö. They were not part of the upper divisions in the early days of Swedish football and only made their first appearance in the third tier in 1947. During the 1950s and the early-1960s the club made a push to raise the level of football by inviting and playing against foreign teams such as Flamengo, Juventus and Fluminense. This coupled with an increase in the amount of training helped the team establish themselves in the second tier.

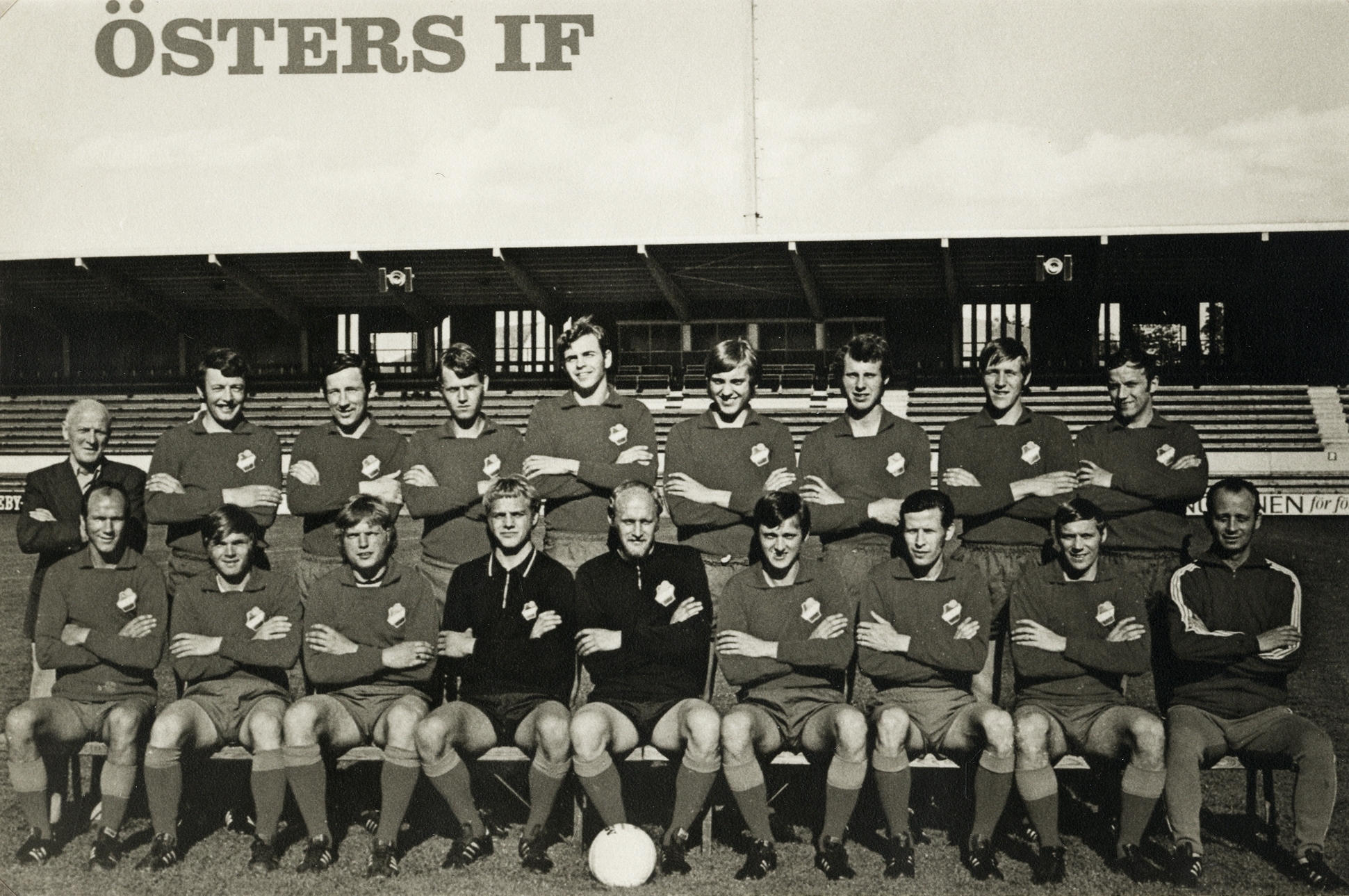
1970 team photo of Östers IF.

In 1961, Öster had their first chance ever to qualify for Allsvenskan but ended up in last place in the four team promotion playoffs. Success in the promotion playoffs would instead come 6 years later in 1967 when they beat IK Brage in the deciding game in front of a home crowd of 26,404 people. Öster defied the odds during their first season in the top division and won the league on goal difference after four teams had ended the season on exactly the same amount of points. Following their championship title the club had a 10 year period of solid Allsvenskan finishes before becoming dominant in the late-1970s and early-1980s, when they won the league three times in four years.

After that successful era followed a slow decline over the next couple of decades which culminated in their relegation to the second tier in 1998. After that the club has found it hard to reestablish itself in Allsvenskan and has only made short one year appearances.

== Current squad ==
As of 1 September 2026

Note: Flags indicate national team as defined under FIFA eligibility rules; some limited exceptions apply. Players may hold more than one non-FIFA nationality.

No.	Pos.	Nation	Player
1	GK	SWE	Carl Lundahl Persson
3	DF	GHA	Kingsley Gyamfi
4	DF	SWE	Sebastian Starke Hedlund
5	DF	SWE	Mattis Adolfsson
6	MF	SWE	Noah Söderberg
7	FW	SWE	Christian Kouakou
8	MF	SWE	Daniel Ask
9	FW	SWE	Kalipha Jawla (on loan from Djurgården)
10	MF	SWE	Oscar Uddenäs
11	MF	SWE	Filip Olsson
14	DF	SWE	Dennis Olsson
15	DF	FIN	Tatu Varmanen

No.	Pos.	Nation	Player
16	DF	SWE	Raymond Adjei
17	MF	SWE	Hannes Bladh Pijaca
18	MF	SWE	Keyano Marrah (on loan from Hammarby TFF)
19	MF	FIN	Matias Tamminen
21	DF	SWE	Vincent Lind
23	FW	SWE	Samuel Burakovsky (on loan from Bodø/Glimt)
26	MF	DEN	Magnus Christensen
29	MF	DEN	Marinus Due Grandt
33	GK	USA	Michael Hartmann
34	FW	SWE	William Thellsson (on loan from Sandvikens IF)
—	DF	SWE	Axel Lindahl

=== Out on loan ===
Note: Flags indicate national team as defined under FIFA eligibility rules; some limited exceptions apply. Players may hold more than one non-FIFA nationality.

No.	Pos.	Nation	Player
2	DF	FIN	Aapo Mäenpää (at FC Haka until 31 December 2026)
12	GK	SWE	Lukas Pihlblad (at Umeå FC until 30 November 2026)
18	FW	GAM	Musa Njie (at Umeå FC until 30 November 2026)

No.	Pos.	Nation	Player
24	MF	SWE	Al-Hussein Shakir (at Umeå FC until 30 November 2026)
31	FW	SWE	Gustav Fälth (at Räppe GoIF until 30 November 2026)

== Personnel ==
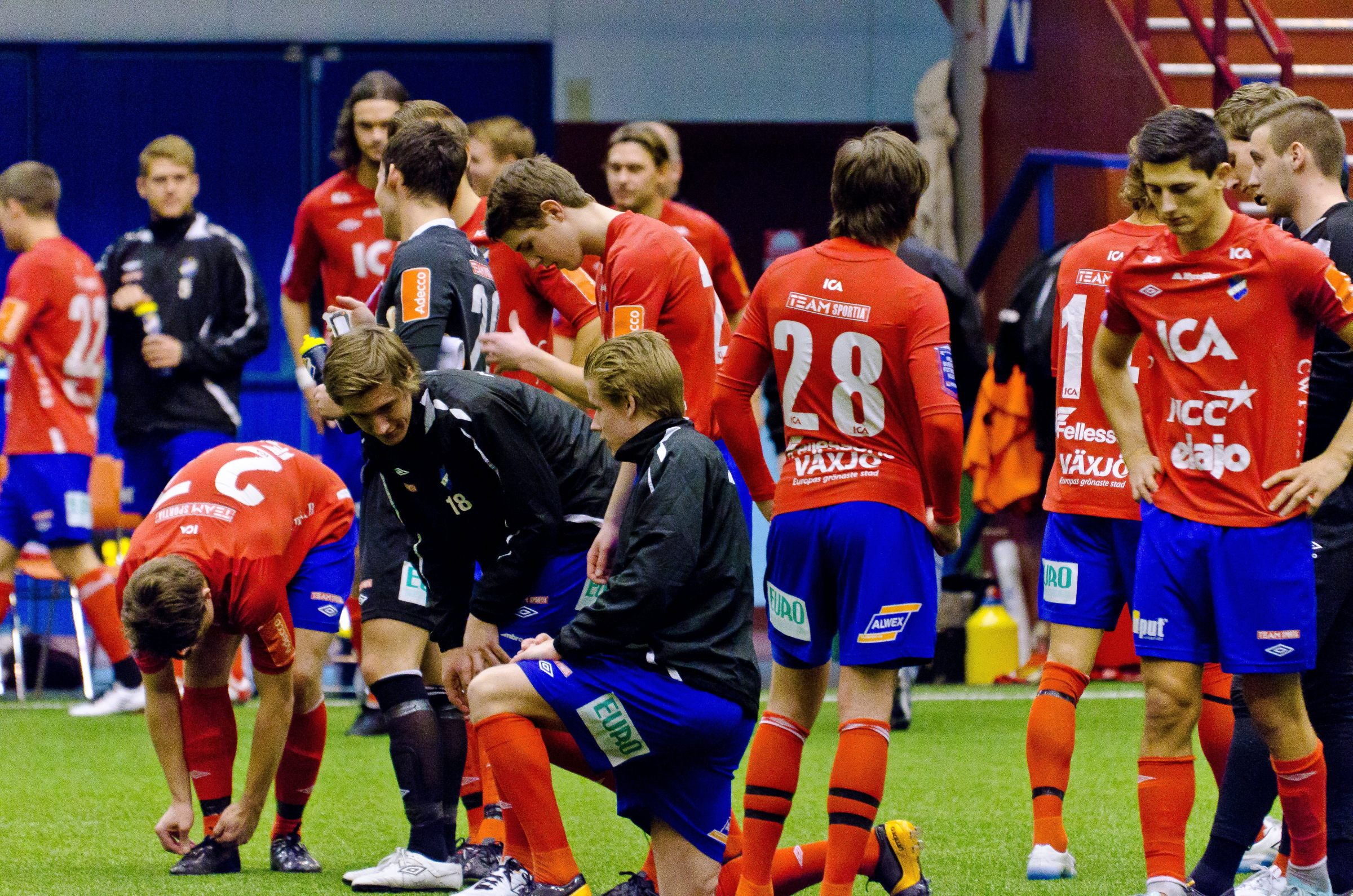
The team during a pregame warmup in 2012 wearing their traditional red and blue kits.

=== Current technical staff ===
Head coach:	(Sweden) Roberth Björknesjö
Assistant coach:	(Sweden) Torbjörn Arvidsson
Goalkeeper coach:	(Sweden) Rasmus Rydén
Physical Coach:	(Sweden) Agne Bergvall
Head of youth department:	(Sweden) Christian Järdler

== Coaches ==
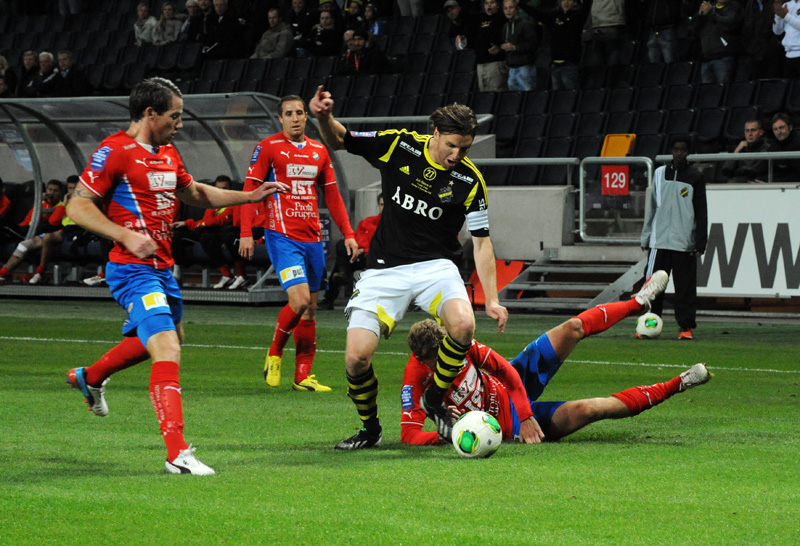
Öster playing against AIK in the 2013 Allsvenskan.

- (Sweden) Bertil Bäckvall (1958–1963)
- (Hungary) Vilmos Varszegi (1967–1973)
- (Sweden) Bengt "Julle" Gustavsson (1973–1974)
- (Sweden) Gunnar Nordahl (1975–1976)
- (Sweden) Lars "Laban" Arnesson (1977–1979)
- (Sweden) Tommy Svensson (1978–1984) (Team manager)
- (Sweden) Bo Johansson (1979–1981)
- (Sweden) Leif Widén (1981–1986)
- (Sweden) Bo Johansson (1986–1988)
- (Sweden) Peo Bild (1988–1989)
- (Sweden) Hans Backe (1989–1994)
- (Sweden) Nanne Bergstrand (1994–1997)
- (Sweden) Andreas Ravelli (1997–1998)
- (Sweden) Bo Axberg (1998)
- (Sweden) Jan Mattsson (1998–2001)
- (Russia) Yevgeni Kuznetsov (2001–2003)
- (Sweden) Leif Widén (2003–2005)
- (Sweden) Lars Jacobsson (2005–2006)
- (England) Giles Stille (2007)
- (Russia) Yevgeni Kuznetsov (2007–2009)
- (Sweden) Andreas Ottosson (2010)
- (Sweden) Ludwig Ernstsson (2010)
- (Sweden) Hans Gren (2010)
- (Sweden) Roar Hansen (2011–2012)
- (Sweden) Andreas Thomsson (2013)
- (Sweden) Roberth Björknesjö (2014)
- (Sweden) Thomas Askebrand (2014–2017)
- (Sweden) Christian Järdler (2018–2019)
- (Sweden) Denis Velic (2019–2021)
- (Serbia) Srdjan "Tufa" Tufegdzic (2021–2023)
- (England) Martin Foyston (2023–2025)
- (Sweden) Roberth Björknesjö (2025)
- (Sweden) Max Mölder (2026)
- (Sweden) Daniel Friberg (2026–)

== Achievements ==
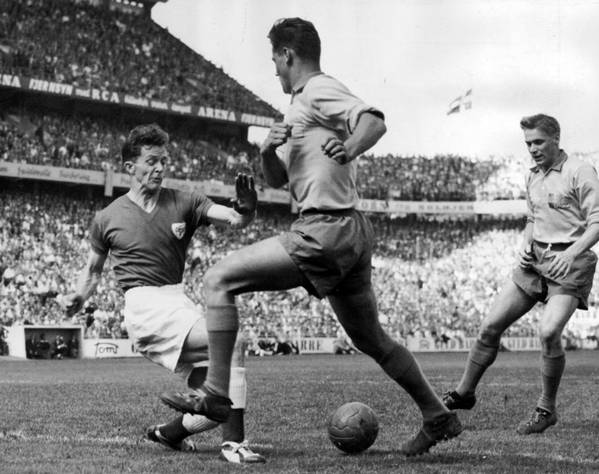
Striker Harry Bild was part of the team that won the club's first title in the 1968 Allsvenskan.

- Swedish Champions^{[B]}
  - Winners (4): 1968, 1978, 1980, 1981

=== League ===
- Allsvenskan:
  - Winners (4): 1968, 1978, 1980, 1981
  - Runners-up (3): 1973, 1975, 1992
- Superettan:
  - Winners (2): 2002, 2012
  - Runners-up (2): 2005, 2024
- Division 1 Södra:
  - Winners (3): 1989, 2009, 2016
  - Runners-up (1): 2008

=== Cups ===
- Svenska Cupen:
  - Winners (1): 1976–77
  - Runners-up (4): 1973–74, 1981–82, 1984–85, 1990–91
- Allsvenskan play-offs:
  - Runners-up (1): 1983

== Attendances ==
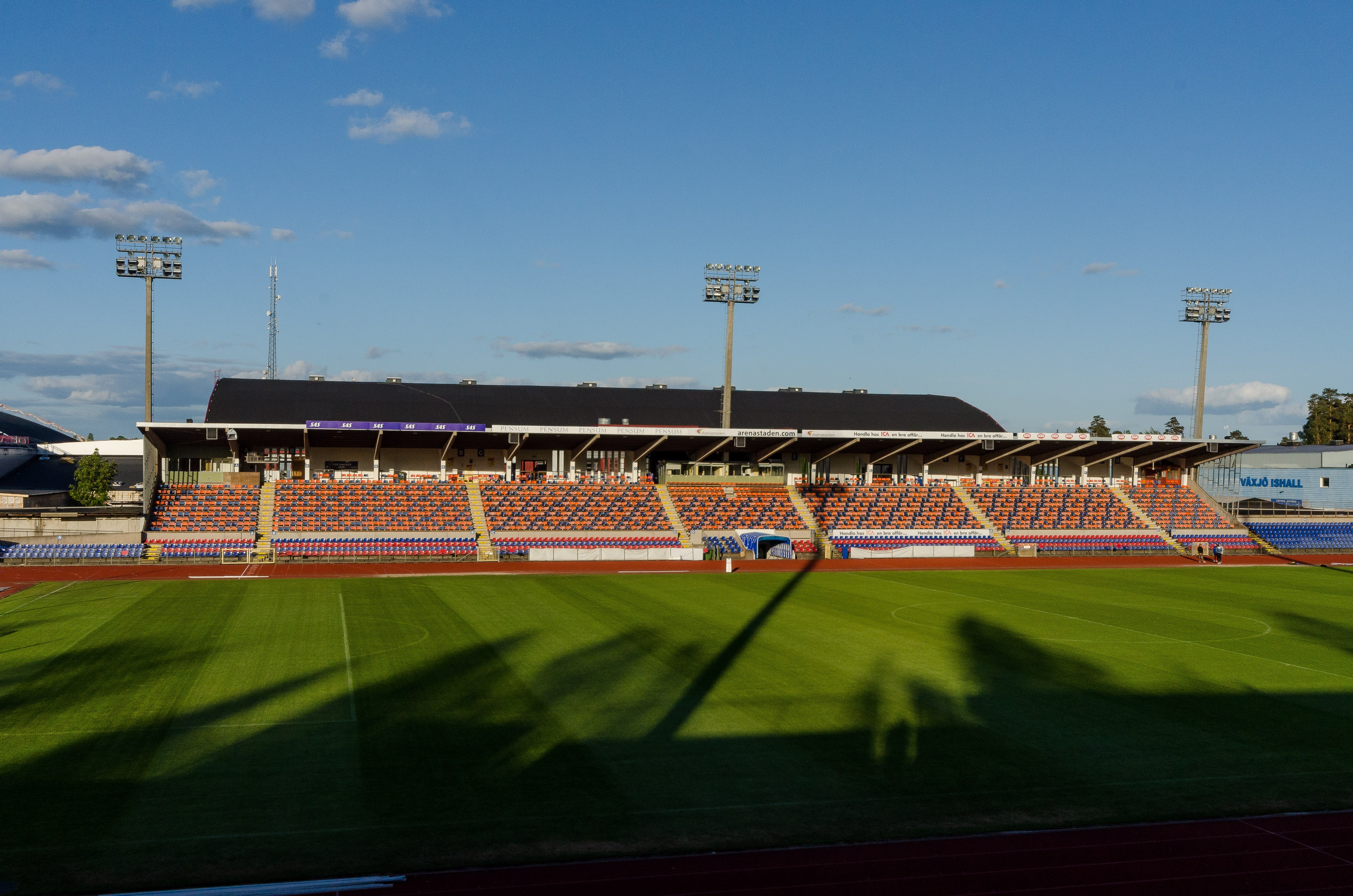
Värendsvallen: Öster stadium 1966–2012

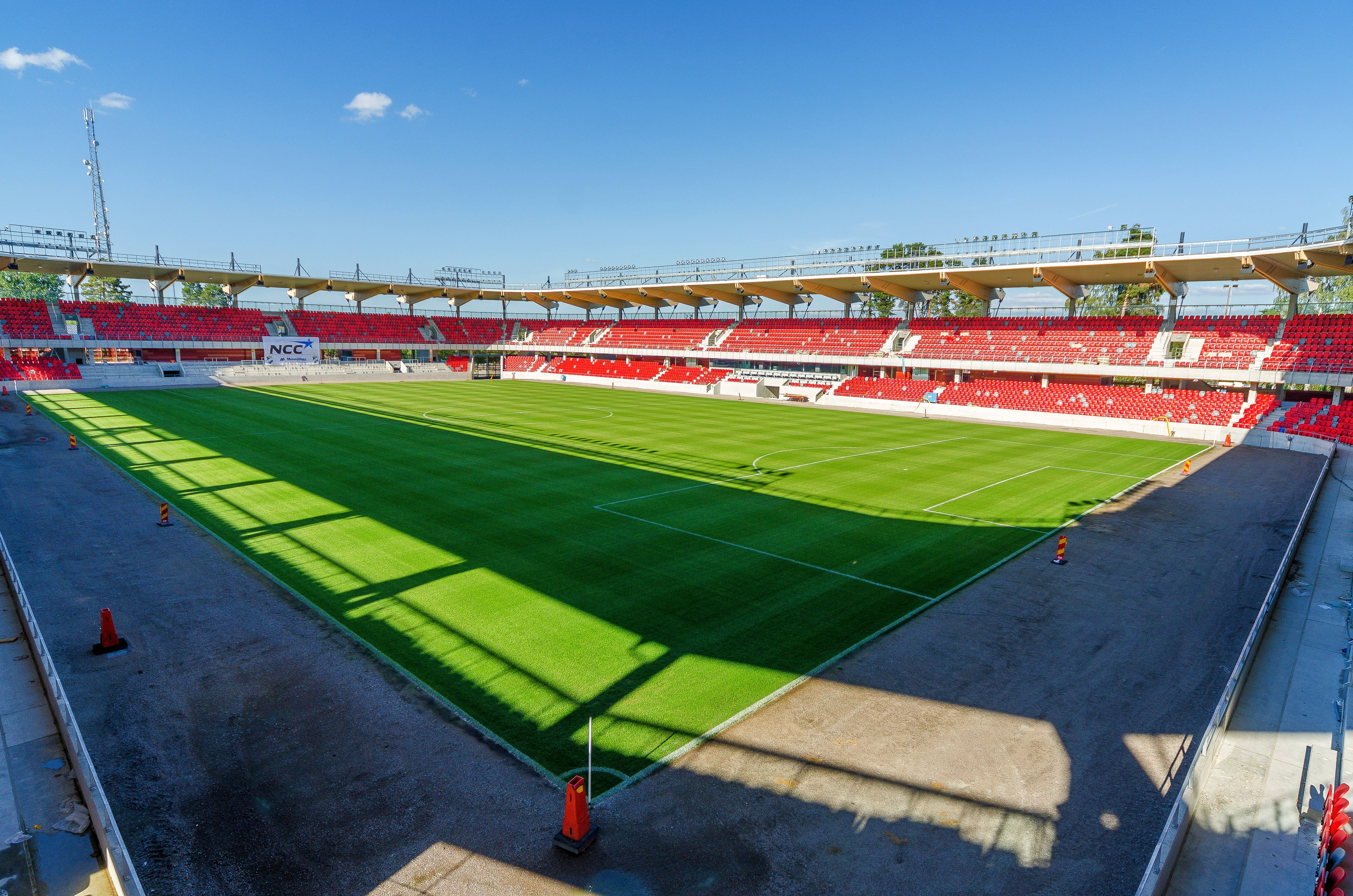
Spiris Arena: Öster stadium 2012–

In recent seasons Östers IF have had the following average attendances:

Season	Average attendance	Division / Section	Level
2004	2,670	Superettan	Tier 2
2005	3,517	Superettan	Tier 2
2006	5,364	Allsvenskan	Tier 1
2007	2,791	Superettan	Tier 2
2008	1,817	Div 1 Södra	Tier 3
2009	1,919	Div 1 Södra	Tier 3
2010	2,145	Superettan	Tier 2
2011	2,637	Superettan	Tier 2
2012	4,733	Superettan	Tier 2
2013	5,751	Allsvenskan	Tier 1
2014	3,289	Superettan	Tier 2

* Attendances are provided in the Publikliga sections of the Svenska Fotbollförbundet website.

== Footnotes ==
A Current youth players who at least have sat on the bench in a competitive match.

B. The title of "Swedish Champions" has been awarded to the winner of four different competitions over the years. Between 1896 and 1925 the title was awarded to the winner of Svenska Mästerskapet, a stand-alone cup tournament. No clubs were given the title between 1926 and 1930 even though the first-tier league Allsvenskan was played. In 1931 the title was reinstated and awarded to the winner of Allsvenskan. Between 1982 and 1990 a play-off in cup format was held at the end of the league season to decide the champions. After the play-off format in 1991 and 1992 the title was decided by the winner of Mästerskapsserien, an additional league after the end of Allsvenskan. Since the 1993 season the title has once again been awarded to the winner of Allsvenskan.
