= Joe Donkor =

Ghanaian politician (1942–2019)

Hon. Joe Donkor

Member of Ghana Parliament for Tano North Constituency
- In office 7 January 1997 – 6 January 2005
- Preceded by: Dominic Yaw Amoako
- Succeeded by: Ernest Akobuor Debrah

Personal details
- Born: 1942
- Died: 2019 (aged 76–77)
- Party: New Patriotic Party
- Education: University of Ghana
- Occupation: Politician
- Profession: Managing Director

Joe Donkor (1942–2019) was a Ghanaian politician and also a Deputy minister for Education and Employment and Labour Relations. He served as a member of parliament for the Tano North constituency in Brong Ahafo Region of Ghana.

== Early life and education ==
Joe Donkor was born in 1942. Joe started his education at Yamfo Roman Catholic Primary School. After his elementary school, Donkor continued his secondary school education at Achimota college in Accra. When he was in the final year of sixth form at Achimota school Ghana's former president JJ Rawlings started form one at Achimota school. He obtained his bachelor's degree at the University of Ghana, Legon.

After completing his bachelor's degree, he was employed by SIC which subsequently sponsored him to pursue a postgraduate degree in UK. He came back to Ghana in 1981 to work with SIC as a managing director for 8 years from 1981 to 1989.

== Political career ==
=== Member of Parliament ===
In 1992 when Ghana was ushered into the fourth republic uncle Joe contested for the post of an MP of Tano North constituency on the ticket of New Patriotic Party (NPP) . He did not go to parliament as New Patriotic Party led by its flag bearer Professor Albert Adu Boahen boycotted the parliamentary elections. Donkor contested again in 1996 on the ticket of NPP and won becoming one of the only three MPs from the then Brong Ahafo region to go to Parliament on the ticket of NPP. The other two MPs from B/A were from Sunyani East and Sunyani West.

Donkor braced all the odds to campaign in rural areas at a time campaigning to try and salvage a win for his party ahead of the elections. He won the elections and went to parliament in 1996 as a member of the opposition. In 2001 he won again this time going to parliament as one of the majority MPs serving in support of the government of H. E. John Agyekum Kuffour. He later on lost his third bid to present the party in the 2004 Ghanaian general election to Ernest Akobuor Debrah of New Patriotic Party in the primaries of the party.

=== Minister of state ===
In 2002, President Kufour appointed him as the deputy minister of Labour and employment. Later he was moved to the Ministry of Education becoming the deputy minister of education in 2003.

== Elections ==
In the year 2000, Donkor won the Ghanaian general elections as the member of parliament for the Tano North constituency of the Brong Ahafo Region of Ghana. He won on the ticket of the New Patriotic Party. His constituency was a part of the 7 parliamentary seats out of 21 seats won by the National Democratic Congress in that election for the Brong Ahafo Region. The National Democratic Congress won a minority total of 92 parliamentary seats out of 200 seats in the 3rd parliament of the 4th republic of Ghana.

He was elected with 13,408 votes out of 23,924 total valid votes cast. This was equivalent to 56.8% of the total valid votes cast. He was elected over Nana Opoku Acheampong of the National Democratic Congress, Alex Owusu Kwakye of the National Reform Party, Appiah Kwadwo John of the People's National Convention and Addo Kwasi of the Convention People's Party. These won 9,361, 374, 264 and 190 votes respectively out of the total valid votes cast. These were equivalent to 39.7%, 1.6% and 1.1% and 0.8% respectively of total valid votes cast.

== Personal life ==
Donkor was married and he had 7 children. He died in February 2019.
