= Jakub Pícha =

Czech footballer (born 1991)

Personal information
- Date of birth: 21 July 1991 (age 35)
- Place of birth: Děčín, Czechoslovakia
- Position: Defender

Team information
- Current team: SV Eintracht Elster
- Number: 3

Senior career*
Years	Team	Apps	(Gls)
2009–2011	Teplice	1	(0)
2011	→ Česká Lípa (loan)		
2011–2014	SK Roudnice nad Labem		
2014–2017	FK Ústí nad Labem	41	(0)
2017–	SV Eintracht Elster	2	(0)

International career
2006–2007	Czech Republic U-16	10	(1)
2007	Czech Republic U-17	3	(0)
- * Club domestic league appearances and goals as of 3 September 2017

Jakub Pícha (born 21 July 1991) is a Czech football player who currently plays for German club SV Eintracht Elster. He has represented his country at youth international level.
