= Adji =

Adji may refer to:

- Adji Bousso Dieng, Senegalese computer scientist and statistician
- Boukary Adji (1939–2018), politician from Niger
- Oware, an abstract strategy game, for which "Adji" is the Ewe language name

== See also ==
- Adjei, a similar name
