= Charles Asiedu =

Ghanaian politician

Hon. Charles Asiedu MP

Member of Parliament for Tano South Constituency
- Incumbent
- Assumed office 7 January 2025
- Preceded by: Benjamin Yeboah Sekyere
- President: John Mahama
- Vice President: Jane Naana Opoku-Agyemang

Personal details
- Born: 23 June 1987 (age 39)
- Party: National Democratic Congress (Ghana)
- Education: University of Ghana, Legon
- Occupation: Politician

Charles Asiedu (born on 23rd June, 1987 in Dwomo) is a Ghanaian politician who is a member of the ninth parliament of the fourth republic of Ghana representing Tano South (Ghana parliament constituency) in the Ahafo Region. He is a member of National Democratic Congress. (NDC)

== Early life and career ==
Asiedu was born on 23 June 1987 in Dwomo in the Ahafo Region of Ghana. He attended the University of Ghana Business School, where he obtained a Master of Arts degree in September 2022.

Before entering Parliament, Asiedu worked at KAYAB Maritime Services as a Logistics Manager.

== Politics ==
=== NDC 2023 parliamentary primaries ===
Charles Asiedu contested the National Democratic Congress primaries and won with 698 votes over his closes contestant Nana Agyeman Prempeh who had 281 votes.

==== 2024 Ghanaian general election ====
Mr Asiedu contested the Tano South constituency parliamentary seat in the Ahafo Region on the ticket of National Democratic Congress during the 2024 Ghanaian general election and won with 20,056 representing 50.78%. He won the election over the New Patriotic Party candidate Benjamin Yeboah Sekyere who polled 19,061 which is equivalent to 48.27% and an independent candidate Kofi Nti Christopher who had 375 votes representing 0.95%.

== Personal life ==
His parents are Johnson Asiedu Nketia who is the national chairman of the NDC and Mrs. Vida Adomah. He had five siblings:Amma Addae Nketiah, Kwaku Asiedu Nketiah, Yaa Asantewaa Nketiah, Afia Afra Nketiah and Kwame Boateng Nketiah. He is a Christian.
