= Eric Adjei =

Ghanaian footballer (born 1984)

Personal information
- Full name: Eric Kwame Adjei
- Date of birth: September 12, 1984 (age 42)
- Place of birth: Tema, Ghana
- Height: 1.85 m (6 ft 1 in)
- Position: Midfielder

Team information
- Current team: Great Olympics
- Number: 24

Youth career
- 1991–1994: F.C. Ever Green
- 1994–1997: F.C. Okyeman
- 1997–2000: F.C. Arsalah

Senior career*
Years	Team	Apps	(Gls)
2001–2003	F.C. Supreme	27	(0)
2003–2005	Tema F.C.	17	(0)
2005–2006	San Gennaro Calcio	25	(0)
2006–2007	TSV Hartberg	30	(0)
2007–2009	Bohemians Prague (Střížkov)	6	(0)
2009–2010	→ Great Olympics (loan)	26	(4)
2011	Roudnice nad Labem	?	(?)
2011–present	FC Chomutov	?	(?)
- * Club domestic league appearances and goals

Eric Kwame Adjei (born September 12, 1984, in Tema, Ghana) is a Ghanaian footballer who plays as a midfielder for SK Roudnice nad Labem.

He played domestically for F.C. Ever Green, F.C. Okyeman, F.C. Arsalah, F.C. Supreme, F.C. Tema and Great Olympics, in Italy for San Gennaro Calcio, in Austria for TSV Hartberg, and in the Czech Republic for Bohemians Prague (Střížkov), SK Roudnice nad Labem and FC Chomutov.
