= Raymond Adjei =

Swedish association football player

Personal information
- Full name: Raymond Owusu Ameyaw Adjei
- Date of birth: 10 February 2004 (age 22)
- Place of birth: Malmö, Sweden
- Height: 1.75 m (5 ft 9 in)
- Position: Right back

Team information
- Current team: Öster
- Number: 16

Youth career
- 2012–2015: BK Olympic
- 2016–2022: Malmö FF

Senior career*
Years	Team	Apps	(Gls)
2023	Malmö FF	0	(0)
2023	→ BK Olympic (loan)	17	(0)
2024–	Öster	40	(0)

International career^{‡}
2021–2022	Sweden U19	3	(0)
- * Club domestic league appearances and goals as of 12 November 2026 ‡ National team caps and goals as of 25 March 2023

Raymond Owusu Ameyaw Adjei (born 10 February 2004) is a Swedish professional footballer who plays as a right back for Superettan club Östers IF.

== Club career ==
Adjei began playing with BK Olympic when he was eight years old, before moving to Malmö FF at the age of twelve. On 21 December 2022, Adjei was sent out on loan to BK Olympic for the 2023 season.

Before the 2024 season, Adjei signed for Östers IF on a free transfer. On 10 December 2025, he extended his contract with the club until the end of 2027, following their relegation from Allsvenskan. In 2026, he grabbed a starting spot at right back for Öster.

== International career ==
Adjei is a youth international for Sweden. He is also able to represent Ghana internationally.

== Personal life ==
Adjei's parents were both born in Ghana, and moved to Sweden at age 23 and 18 respectively.
