= Tano (name) =

Tano may refer to the following people

Given name

- "Don Tano", the Sicilian capomafia Gaetano Badalamenti
- Tano Cimarosa (1922–2008), Italian actor

Surname

- Asami Tano (田野 アサミ, born 1987), Japanese voice actress
- Barbro Tano (born 1939), Swedish cross-country skier
- Eugenio Tano (1840–1914), Italian painter
- Kevin Tano (born 1993), Dutch association football player
- Kosei Tano (1914–?), Japanese Olympic water polo player
- Rocco Tano also known as Rocco Siffredi, an Italian pornography actor
