= Benjamin Adjei =

German politician (born 1990)

Member of the Landtag of Bavaria
- Incumbent
- Assumed office 5 November 2018
- Preceded by: Joachim Unterländer
- Constituency: Munich-Moosach (2018–2023); Upper Bavaria (2023–present)

Personal details
- Born: 14 May 1990 (age 35) Tegernsee
- Party: Alliance 90/The Greens (since 2011)

Benjamin Adjei (born 14 May 1990 in Tegernsee) is a German politician serving as a member of the Landtag of Bavaria since 2018. From 2015 to 2018, he served as chairman of the Green Youth in Upper Bavaria.
