= Francis Adjei =

Ghanaian footballer

Personal information
- Date of birth: 30 May 1996 (age 30)
- Place of birth: Fadama
- Position: Midfielder

Team information
- Current team: Karela United F.C.

Youth career
- Desderos Fc: Fayernood Academy Ghana

Senior career*
Years	Team	Apps	(Gls)
- Ashanti Gold Sc
- Karela United
- Vestri Fc
- * Club domestic league appearances and goals

Francis Adjei is a Ghanaian professional footballer who currently plays for Karela United F.C. in the Ghana Premier League.

== Career ==
Francis Adjei has played for several Ghanaian teams including Karela United and Ashanti Gold as a midfielder.

== International career ==
In November 2013, coach Maxwell Konadu invited him to be a part of the Ghana squad for the 2013 WAFU Nations Cup. He helped the team to a first-place finish after Ghana beat Senegal by three goals to one.
