= Tano Station =

Tano Station (田野駅) is the name of two train stations in Japan:

- Tano Station (Kōchi)
- Tano Station (Miyazaki)

== See also ==
- Tanno Station
