= Bechem =

Town and District Capital in Ahafo Region, Ghana

- Town and District Capital
- Location of Bechem in Ahafo
- Coordinates: 7°05′N 2°01′W
- Country: Ghana
- Region: Ahafo
- District: Tano South District
- Elevation: 863 ft (263 m)

Population (2013)
  - Total: 17,677
- Demonym: Bechemer
- Time zone: GMT
  - Summer (DST): GMT

Bechem is a town and is the capital of the Tano South district of the Ahafo Region of Ghana, and Bechem is the district capital for the Tano South Constituency. Bechem is located close to the capital town of Bono, Sunyani. The town is known for the Bechem Presbyterian Secondary School. The school is a second-cycle institution. The town has one of the best teacher training colleges in the country, known as St Joseph College (JOSCO), and has Bechem School for the Deaf and Blind and Technical Institute for the Deaf. It has two villages known as Techimantia and Derma, which both stand tall when it comes to tomato production in the country.

It is the home of Bechem United Football Club, who currently play in the top division in Ghana.
