= Tano North (Ghana parliament constituency) =

Constituency in the Ahafo Region of Ghana

Tano North District
- constituency for the Parliament of Ghana
- District: Tano North District
- Region: Ahafo Region of Ghana

Current constituency
- Party: New Patriotic Party
- MP: Gideon Boako

Tano North is one of the constituencies represented in the Parliament of Ghana. It elects one member of parliament (MP) by the first-past-the-post system of election. Gideon Boako is a member of parliament for the constituency. He was elected on the ticket of the New Patriotic Party (NPP) won a majority of 3,420 votes to become the MP. He had also represented the constituency in the 4th Republic parliament.

Tano North constituency is one of the constituencies that the New Patriotic Party wins almost every election and a stronghold for the party. In the last two decades, the constituency has consistently elected their representative of parliament from the NPP.

== Member of Parliament ==
First elected	Member	Party
1996	Joe Donkor	New Patriotic Party
2000	Joe Donkor	New Patriotic Party
2004	Ernest Akobuor Debrah	New Patriotic Party
2008	Ernest Akobuor Debrah	New Patriotic Party
2012	Freda Prempeh	New Patriotic Party
2016	Freda Prempeh	New Patriotic Party
2020	Freda Prempeh	New Patriotic Party
2024	Gideon Boako	New Patriotic Party

== See also ==
- List of Ghana Parliament constituencies
