= Hans Gren =

Swedish football manager

Personal information
- Date of birth: 2 October 1957 (age 69)
- Place of birth: Gothenburg, Sweden

Senior career*
Years	Team	Apps	(Gls)
- Göteborgs FF

Managerial career
- 1990–1992: Mölnlycke IF
- 1993–1994: GAIS (assistant manager)
- 1995–1996: Åsa IF
- 1997–1998: GAIS
- 1999: IFK Göteborg (youth team)
- 2000: Bodens BK
- 2001–2002: IF Elfsborg (youth team)
- 2003: Kållered SK
- 2004–2007: GAIS (assistant manager)
- 2008–2010: Malmö FF (assistant manager)
- 2010: Östers IF
- * Club domestic league appearances and goals

Hans Gren (born 2 October 1957) is a Swedish football manager. Among others, he managed GAIS, then youth teams of IFK Göteborg and IF Elfsborg. He was assistant manager at Malmö FF from 2008 until he left in the preseason of 2010. He was then manager of Östers IF.

== External sources ==
- Malmö FF Profile
