= Mavis Adjei =

Ghanaian actress

- Born: 1982 (age 43–44); Akwatia, Ghana
- Known for: Church Money, Salãm, Love & politics
- Children: 3

Mavis Adjei is a Ghanaian actress currently based in the Netherlands.

== Early life and education ==
Adjei hails from the diamond town of Akwatia in the Eastern Region of Ghana. She had her secondary education at Swedru Secondary School in the Central Region of Ghana from 1994 to 1996.

== Career ==
With over 25 films to her credit, her film roles include notable performances in Amsterdam Diary, Love & Politics, Church Money, Obaa pa, Salãm and many others. She also starred in numerous soap series in Ghana.

== Personal life ==
Adjei lives in the Netherlands with her children: two daughters, Tyra and Kayla, and her son, Kieran.
