= Filip Žderić =

German-born Croatian footballer

Personal information
- Date of birth: 11 December 1991 (age 34)
- Place of birth: Karlsruhe, Germany
- Height: 1.74 m (5 ft 9 in)
- Position: Right back

Team information
- Current team: Rudeš

Youth career
- Zagreb
- Croatia Sesvete

Senior career*
Years	Team	Apps	(Gls)
2011–2013	GOŠK Gabela	39	(0)
2013–2014	Šiauliai	32	(0)
2014–2015	Imotski	14	(1)
2015–2017	Cibalia	53	(0)
2017–2018	Gaz Metan Mediaș	10	(0)
2018	Kukësi	16	(1)
2019	Zadar	9	(0)
2019	Botev Vratsa	2	(0)
2020	Cibalia	3	(0)
2020–2021	Kustošija	3	(0)
2021–2022	Rudeš	2	(0)
- * Club domestic league appearances and goals as of 21:55, 20 February 2021 (UTC)

Filip Žderić (born 11 December 1991) is a Croatian professional footballer who plays as a right back for Rudeš.

== Club career ==
=== Kukësi ===
In January 2018, Žderić moved to Albanian Superliga club Kukësi on a free transfer. He made his league debut for the club on 26 January 2018 in a 3–1 away victory over KF Vllaznia Shkodër. In this match, he also scored his first league goal for Kukësi. The goal, scored in the 80th minute, made the score 2–1. He played all ninety minutes of the match. He left the club at the end of the season.

=== NK Zadar ===
On 21 March 2019 it was confirmed, that Žderić had joined Croatian Second Football League club NK Zadar.

== Honours ==
HNK Cibalia

- Croatian Second Football League: 2015–16
