= Marko Rašo =

Croatian footballer

Personal information
- Date of birth: 25 July 1989 (age 37)
- Place of birth: Zadar, SR Croatia, SFR Yugoslavia
- Height: 1.75 m (5 ft 9 in)
- Position: Midfielder

Senior career*
| Years | Team | Apps | (Gls) |
| 2006–2010 | Zadar | | |
| 2009–2010 | → Primorac Biograd (loan) | | |
| 2010 | Zlatna Luka Sukosan | | |
| 2011 | Zrinjski Mostar | 1 | (0) |
| 2011 | Teplice | 0 | (0) |
| 2011 | → Roudnice nad Labem (loan) | | |
| 2012 | Zadar | 3 | (2) |
| 2013 | Šiauliai | 12 | (2) |

International career
| 2007 | Croatia U-18 | 2 | (1) |
| 2007 | Croatia U-19 | 1 | (0) |
- * Club domestic league appearances and goals

Marko Rašo (born 25 July 1989) is a Croatian former professional footballer who played as a midfielder.

== Club career ==
Rašo's debut for NK Zadar's senior squad was at the age of 17 in the second Croatian division (2.HNL) against Čakovec. In the first Croatian division (1.HNL) he debuted aged 18 in a match against Međimurje. His first league goal was away at Varteks. In the 2007–08 season when he was a still a youth he had six appearances and one goal and two assists. In 2008–09 he had 16 appearances with one goal and three assists.

On 1 February 2010, he signed a 2.5-year contract with Premier Liga Bosnia and Herzegovina team HŠK Zrinjski Mostar, the champion 2005, 2008. Six months later he joined FK Teplice. Later in 2012 he returned to Zadar and stayed until 1 January 2013. In January 2013 he signed a two-year contract with Lithuanian team FC Siauliai.

== International career ==
Rašo had eight appearances for the Croatian national U-18 and U-19 team, and one goal in the home win against BIH 1–0.
