= Tanno =

The term Tanno may refer to:

== Places ==
- Tanno, Hokkaidō, town in Tokoro District, Japan
- Tanno Station, railway station in above town

== People ==
Tanno is also a surname which may refer to:

- Akira Tanno (1925–2015), Japanese photographer
- Asami Tanno (born 1985), Japanese track athlete
- Giulia Tanno (born 1998), Swiss freestyle skier
- Kenta Tanno (born 1986), Japanese football player
- Shinobu Tanno (born 1973), Japanese illustrator

== Religion ==
- Joyous Life, in which one of Tenrikyo's spiritual practices is tannō (joyous acceptance)
