= Duayaw Nkwanta =

City and Municipal Capital in Ahafo Region, Ghana

- City and Municipal Capital
- Location of Duayaw Nkwanta in Ahafo
- Coordinates: 7°10′N 2°06′W
- Country: Ghana
- Region: Ahafo
- Municipal: Tano North Municipal District
- Elevation: 315 m (1,033 ft)

Population (2013)
  - Total: 27,476
  - Demonym: Duayaw Nkwanter
- Time zone: GMT
  - Summer (DST): GMT

Duayaw Nkwanta is a town and the capital of Tano North Municipal District, a municipal in the Ahafo Region of Ghana. It is located close to Sunyani, the capital of the Bono Region. The infrastructure of Duayaw Nkwanta is well structured. Duayaw Nkwanta has a settlement population of 27,476. This town boasts of good schools such as Boakye Tromo Senior High Technical School, Serwaa Kesse Girls Senior High School, and Presbyterian Midwifery Training College, among others.

== Economy ==
Agriculture is the main occupation among the workforce of Duayaw Nkwanta. Arts, education, and entertainment are common focus areas for children and youth, supported by local commerce and population.

== Health ==
Duayaw Nkwanta has one of the best hospitals in Brong-Ahafo. It is known as the Saint John of God Hospital. The hospital has an excellent orthopaedic centre. It is rated among the top three in Ghana.

== Education ==
Duayaw Nkwanta is also known for the Boakye Tromo Secondary Technical School. It also has a girls' Senior High School known as Serwaa Kesse Girls’ Senior High School. Formerly, it was a mixed school named Duayaw-Nkwanta Secondary School, St. John of God College of Health, and Presbyterian Midwifery.
