= Tano North Municipal District =

- Municipal District
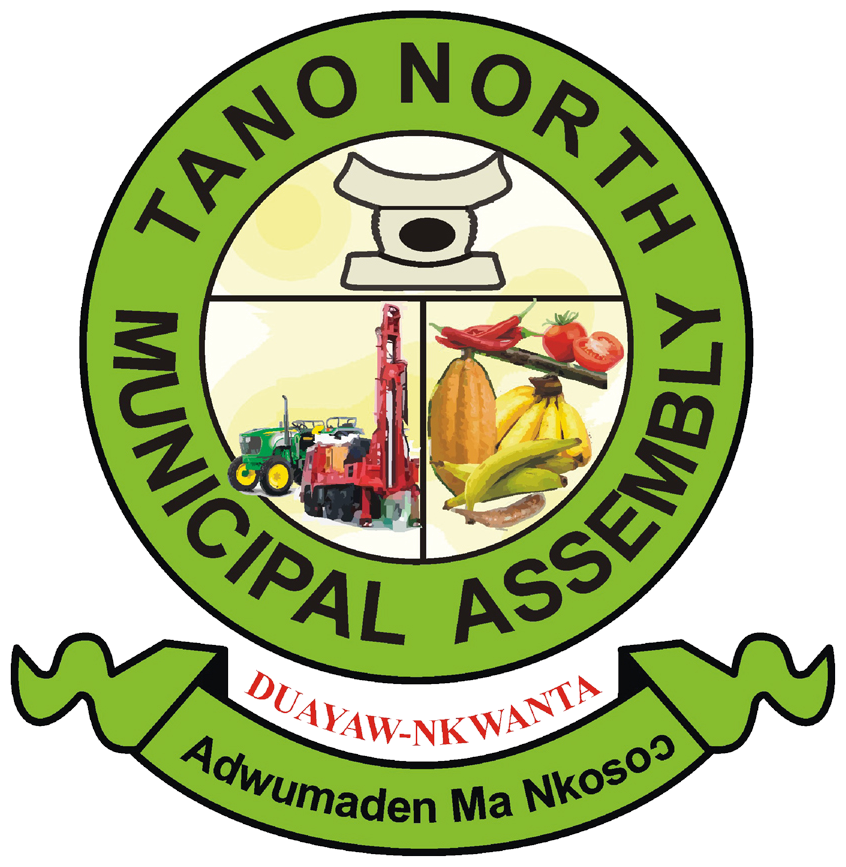
- Seal

- Location of Tano North Municipal District within Ahafo Region
- Coordinates: 7°10′N 2°06′W
- Country: Ghana
- Region: Ahafo Region
- Capital: Duayaw-Nkwanta

Government
  - Municipal Chief Executive: Ernest Kwarteng

Population (2021)
  - Total: 93,608
- Time zone: UTC+0 (GMT)

Tano North Municipal District is one of the six districts in Ahafo Region, Ghana. It was formerly part of the then-larger Tano District since 1988, until the western part of the district was split off to create Tano North District in December 2004; thus the remaining part has been renamed as Tano South District. It was later elevated to municipal district assembly status in April 2018 to become Tano North Municipal District. The municipality is located in the eastern part of Ahafo Region and has Duayaw-Nkwanta as its capital town.

== List of settlements ==
Settlements of Tano North Municipal District
No.	Settlement	Population	Population year
1	Adrobaa		
2	Bomaa		
3	Duayaw Nkwanta	17,130	2012
4	Subompang		
5	Susuanso		
6	Terchire		
7	Yamfo		

== External sources ==
- "Tano North District". Statoids.
- District: Tano North District
