= Tano South (Ghana parliament constituency) =

Constituency in the Ahafo Region of Ghana

Tano South District
- constituency for the Parliament of Ghana
- District: Tano South District
- Region: Ahafo Region of Ghana

Current constituency
- Party: National Democratic Congress
- MP: Charles Asiedu

Tano South is one of the constituencies represented in the Parliament of Ghana. It elects one Member of Parliament (MP) by the first past the post system of election. Charles Asiedu is the member of parliament for the constituency. He was elected on the ticket of the National Democratic Congress (NDC) won a majority of 1,898 votes to become the MP.

== Member of Parliament ==
First Elected	Member	Party
2016	Benjamin Yeboah Sekyere	New Patriotic Party
2020	Benjamin Yeboah Sekyere	New Patriotic Party
2024	Charles Asiedu	National Democratic Congress

== See also ==
- List of Ghana Parliament constituencies
