= Tano South Municipal District =

- Municipal District
- Location of Tano South Municipal District within Ahafo Region
- Coordinates: 7°05′N 2°01′W
- Country: Ghana
- Region: Ahafo Region
- Capital: Bechem

Government
  - Municipal Chief Executive: Collins Offinam Takyi

Population (2021 Census)
  - Total: 87,219
- Time zone: UTC+0 (GMT)

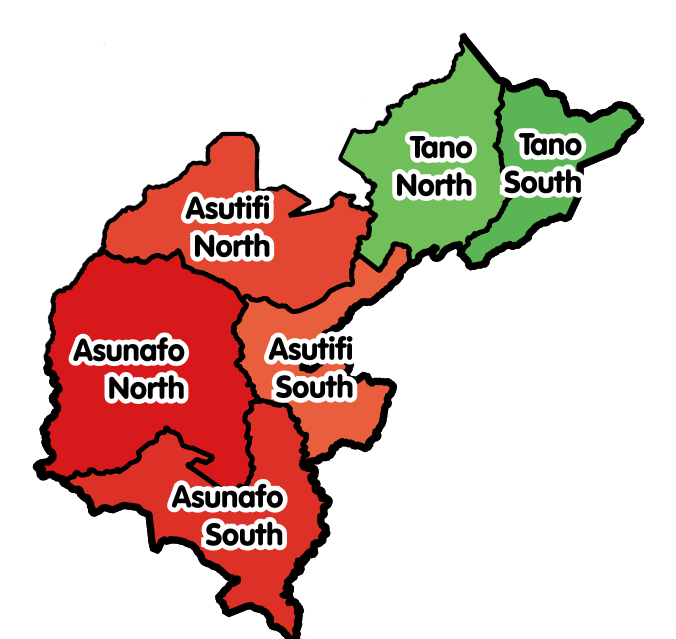

Tano South Municipal District is one of the six districts in Ahafo Region, Ghana. Originally it was formerly part of the then-larger Tano District in 1988, until the western part of the district was split off to create Tano North District in December 2004; thus the remaining part has been renamed as Tano South District. It was later elevated to municipal district assembly status in April 2018 to become Tano South Municipal District. The municipality is located in the eastern part of Ahafo Region and has Bechem as its capital town.

== Background ==
In the district there are three health centres and one hospital. Educational facilities include pre-school facilities, schools and a college. The industry within the district focuses on processing wood and agricultural products.

== List of settlements ==
Settlements of Tano South Municipal District
No.	Settlement	Population	Population year
1	Abease		
2	Akokoa		
3	Bakamba		
4	Bechem		
5	Cherembo		
6	Dama-Nkwanta		
7	Kamampa		
8	Komfourkrom		
9	Nyomoase		
10	Parembo-Sawaba		
11	Prang		
12	Zabrama		

== Sources ==
- "Tano South District". Statoids.
- District: Tano South Municipal
