= Agriculture in Ghana =

Agricultural activity in Ghana

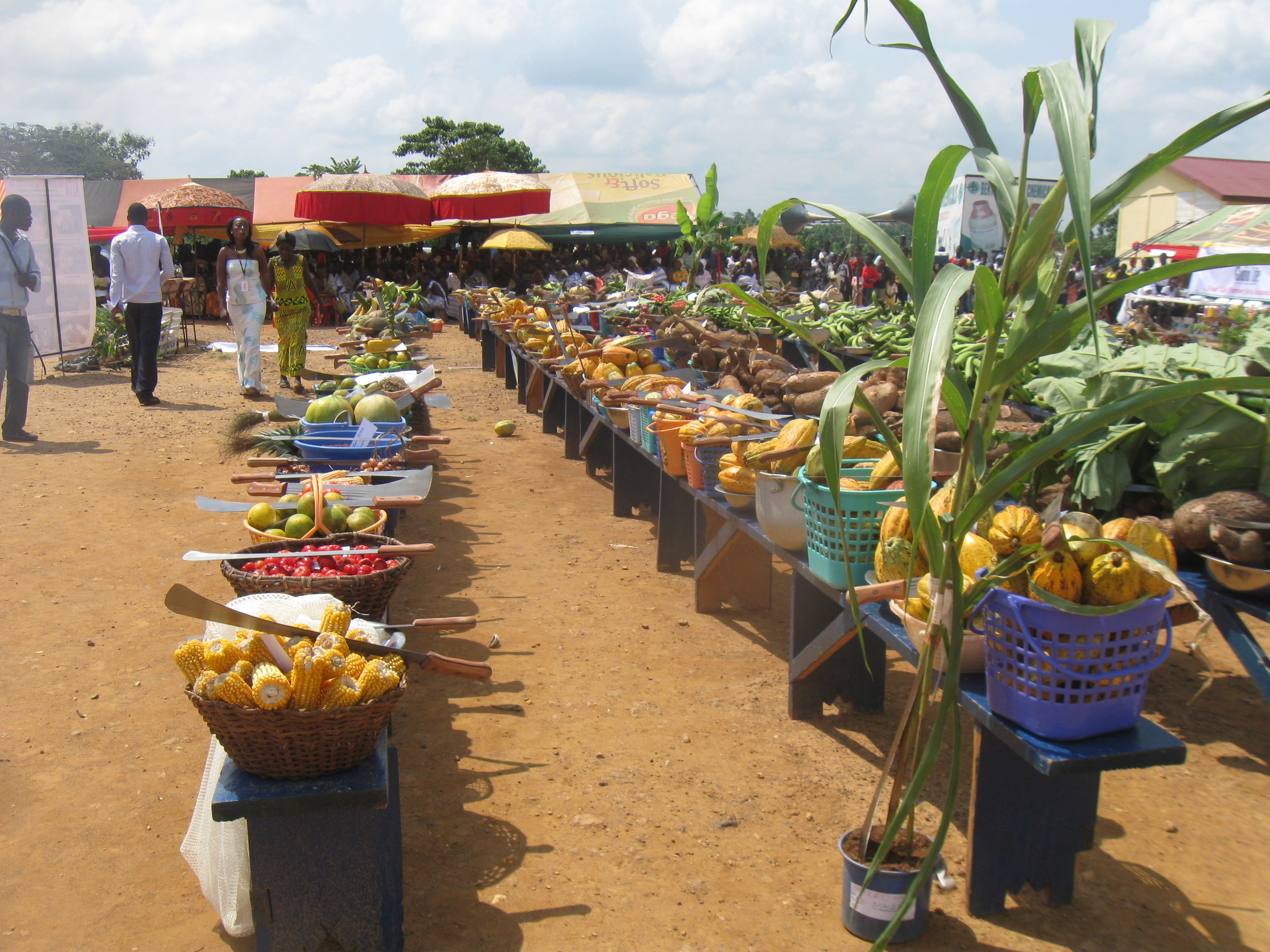
The 26th National Farmers' Day of the 2010 Ghana-KITA Best Institution Award in Ashanti Region.

Agriculture in Ghana consists of a variety of agricultural products and is an established economic sector, providing employment on a formal and informal basis. It is represented by the Ministry of Food and Agriculture. Ghana produces a variety of crops in various climatic zones which range from dry savanna to wet forest which run in east–west bands across Ghana. Agricultural crops, including yams, grains, cocoa, oil palms, kola nuts, and timber, form the base of agriculture in Ghana's economy. In 2013 agriculture employed 53.6% of the total labor force in Ghana.

Because such a larger part of the economy is dependent on rainfed agriculture, it is expected that climate change in Ghana will have serious consequences for both cash crops and staple crop production.

About 136,000 km^{2} (53,000 sq mi) of land, covering approximately 57% of the country's total land area of 238,539 km^{2} (92,100 sq mi) is classified as "agricultural land area" out of which 58,000 km^{2} (22,000 sq mi) is under cultivation and 11,000 hectares under irrigation.

== Production ==
Ghana produced in 2018:

- 20.8 million tons of cassava (4th largest producer in the world, second only to Nigeria, Thailand and Congo);
- 7.8 million tons of yam (2nd largest producer in the world, second only to Nigeria);
- 4.1 million tons of plantain (2nd largest producer in the world, just behind Congo);
- 2.6 million tons of palm oil (8th largest producer in the world);
- 2.3 million tons of maize;
- 1.4 million tons of taro (4th largest producer in the world, second only to Nigeria, China and Cameroon);
- 947 thousand tons of cocoa (2nd largest producer in the world, second only to Ivory Coast);
- 769 thousand tons of rice;
- 753 thousand tons of orange (19th largest producer in the world);
- 713 thousand tons of pineapple (11th largest producer in the world);
- 521 thousand tons of peanut;

In addition, there are smaller productions of other agricultural products such as, sweet potato (151 thousand tons), natural rubber (23 thousand tons) and tobacco (2.3 thousand tons).

The Ministry of Food and Agriculture has produced an integrated pest management plan for the country.

== History ==
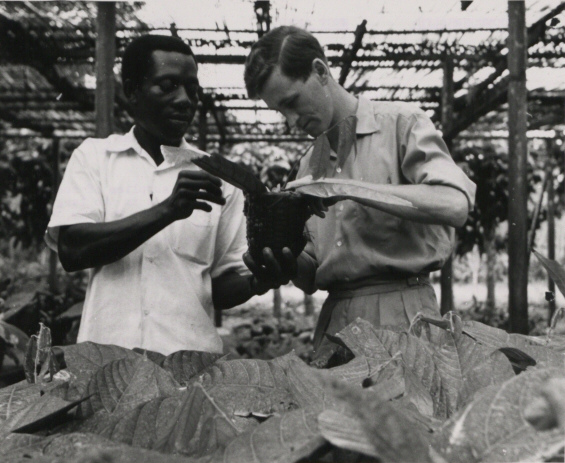
Plant physiologist and his assistant examine a Cacao tree in Ghana in 1957.

Under British colonial rule, Ghanaian farmers seized the opportunity to efficiently grow and export cocoa for the large British market, given that they had a safe food supply. The labor force needed for the labor-intensive production of cocoa in Ghana's fertile south was mainly constituted of migrant workers from the savannah of northern Ghana. This development was facilitated by the traditional Ghanaian system of communal purchase of land, which gave individual farmers the security of planting a cocoa tree that would take several years until being ready to harvest. Among other factors, this enabled Ghana to grow from zero in 1891 to the world's largest cocoa exporter in the world by 1911.

The first president of Ghana, Kwame Nkrumah attempted to use agricultural wealth as a springboard for the country's overall economic development. The Ghanaian agricultural output has consistently fallen since the 1960s. Beginning with the drop in commodity prices in the late 1960s, farmers were faced with fewer incentives to produce as well as with a general deterioration of necessary infrastructure and services. Farmers have also had to deal with increasingly expensive inputs, such as fertilizer, because of the overvaluation of the cedi. Food production has fallen as well, with a decline in the food self-sufficiency ratio from 83 percent in 1965–66 to 71 percent in 1900–80, coupled with a fourfold increase in food imports in the decade prior to 1982. By 1983, when drought hit the region, food shortages were widespread, and export crop production reached an all-time low.

When the Rawlings government initiated the first phase of the Economic Recovery Program (ERP) in 1984, agriculture was identified as the economic sector that could rescue Ghana from a financial ruin. Accordingly, since that time, the government has invested significant funds in the rehabilitation of agriculture. The government had directed capital toward repairing and improving the transportation and distribution infrastructure serving export crops. In addition, specific projects aimed at increasing cocoa yields and at developing the timber industry had been initiated. Except for specific development programs, however, the government had tried to allow the free market to promote higher producer prices and to increase efficiency.

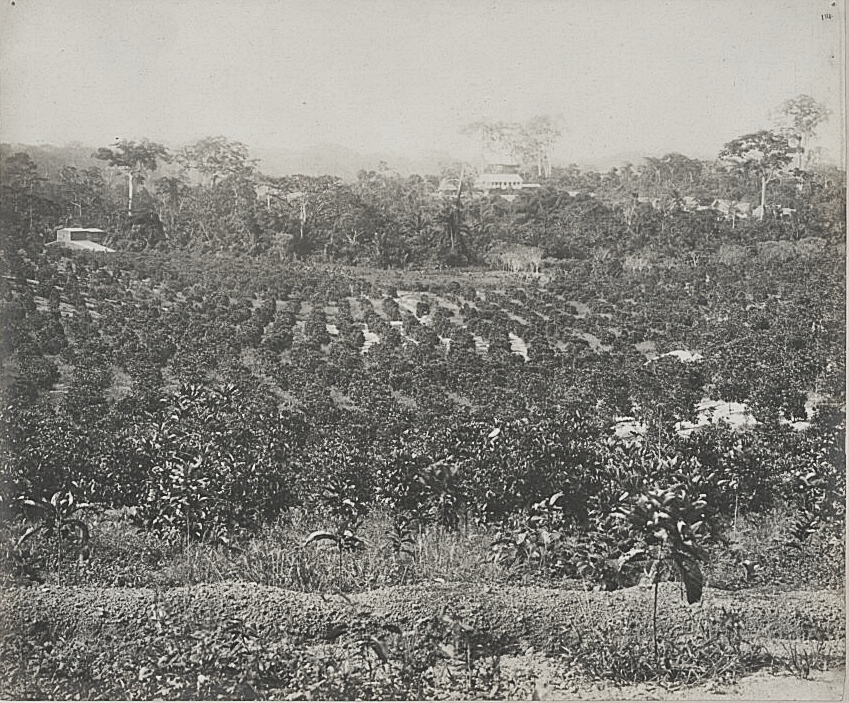
Harvesting and agriculture in Ghana in the 20th century

Although the government was criticized for focusing on exports rather than on food crops under the ERP, by the early 1990s, the Provisional National Defence Council had begun to address the need to increase local production of food. In early 1991, the government announced that one goal of the Medium Term Agricultural Development Program 1991–2000 was to attain food self-sufficiency and security by the year 2000. To this end, the government sought to improve extension services for farmers and to improve crop-disease research. Despite the statements concerning the importance of food crops, however, the plan was still heavily oriented toward market production, improvement of Ghana's balance-of-payments position, and provision of materials for local industrial production. Furthermore, the government planned to rely more heavily on the private sector for needed services and to reduce the role of the public sector, a clear disadvantage for subsistence producers. In particular, industrial tree crops such as cocoa, coffee, and oil palm seedlings were singled out for assistance. Clearly, agricultural sectors that could not produce foreign exchange earnings were assigned a lower priority under the ERP.

The people of the north attempted to reduce its role in marketing and assistance to farmers in several ways. In particular, the Cocoa Marketing Board steadily relinquished its powers over pricing and marketing. The government, furthermore, established a new farmers' organization, the Ghana National Association of Farmers and Fishermen, in early 1991 to replace the Ghana Federation of Agricultural Cooperatives. The new organization was to be funded by the farmers themselves to operate as a cooperative venture at the district, regional, and national levels. Although the government argued that it did not want to be accused of manipulating farmers, the lack of government financial support again put subsistence producers at a disadvantage.

== Agricultural products ==
=== Cocoa ===
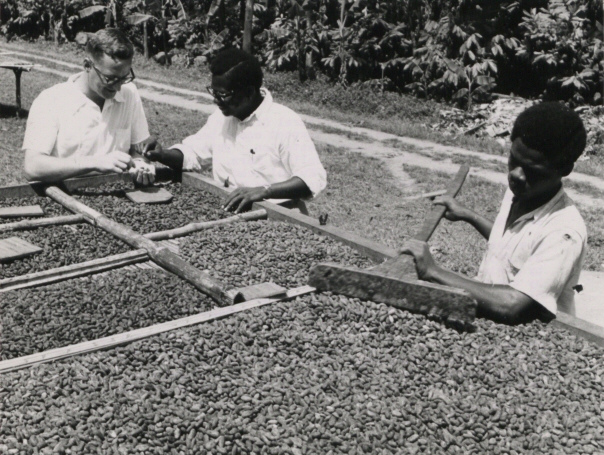
Harvest processing of Cocoa beans in Ghana in the 20th century

For over 81 years Agriculture in Ghana has been regulated by one of its highest yielding exports-Cocoa. Cocoa is Ghana's principal agricultural export. Cocoa production occurs in the forested areas of Ghana: Ashanti Region, Ahafo Region, Central Region, Eastern Region, Western Region and Volta Region. The crop year begins in October while the smaller mid-crop cycle starts in July. All cocoa, except that which is smuggled out of the country, is sold at fixed prices. Although most cocoa production is carried out by peasant farmers, a small number of farmers appear to dominate the trade. The government controls the industry through the Ghana Cocoa Board (COCOBOD). As of 2010, Ghana's cocoa bean exports were valued at $2,219.5 million (US).

As of 2017, Ghana is ranked number two for Cocoa exports behind Côte d'Ivoire bringing in a $1,914 per metric ton (2204.6 lbs. • ~$.868/lbs) received; Cocoa is slated to exceed the national average supply by 97,500 metric tons. This massive increase, in turn, will cause "supply and demand" issues for larger and smaller farmers sharing a 1.3-billion-dollar syndicated loan disbursed by the government for the 2017–2018 season.

The success of Ghana in cocoa production has shaped the economy a great deal and has been able to provide livelihood to more than half a million farmers in the southern part of the country. However, this did not happen overnight but by deliberate worldwide economic reforms.

=== Sweet Potato ===
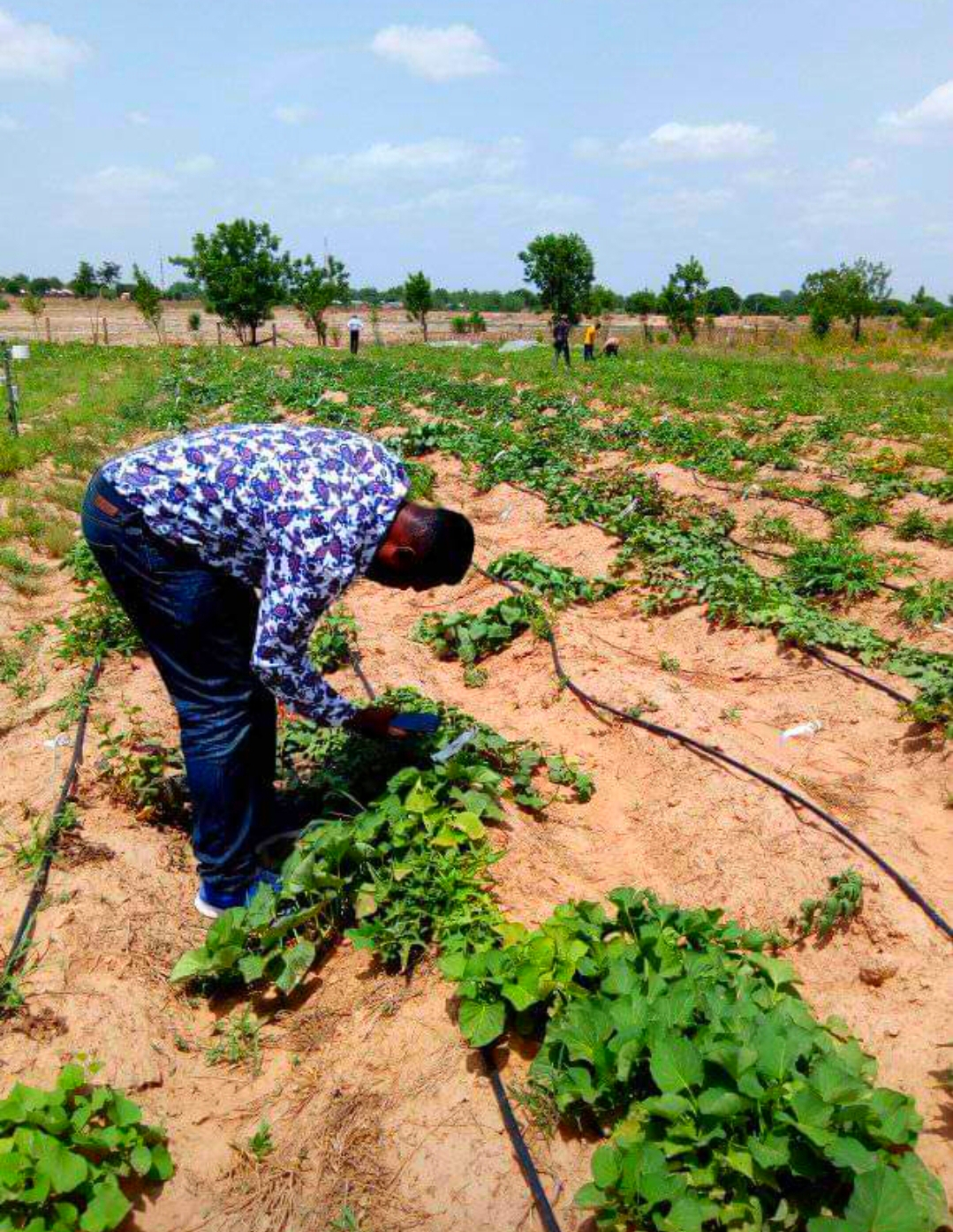
Sweet Potato Farming in Northern Ghana

The sweet potato is a viable resource, because it can be used for many things. The very roots of the sweet potato can be used to help mothers wean their children off of mother's milk. Even though the sweet potato is a good food source for humans, it can be also used in the feeding of livestock. Ghana is considered the leader in research of root crop. The sweet Potato is considered a prime crop. It is mostly grown in the northern parts of Ghana, as well as nationally.

When the sweet potato is brought to market it is processed into things like flour, bread, and beverages are made. Northern Ghana has not been able to take full advantage of this food source, in every part of the country, because some of the land is not fertile, and a complex socioeconomic limitation such as many farm owners not being able to come together. This causes a disruption in the market. There is this mistrust among the local farmers because most of the farmers have different opinions on how the product should be marketed. There are five groups of people that help get the Sweet potato to market, the Farmers, traders, commission agents the processors and final the consumers. They all deal with each other in a private and individuals basis. Transportation of the sweet potato is mostly done by outside source such as hired transportation.

=== Commercial crops ===
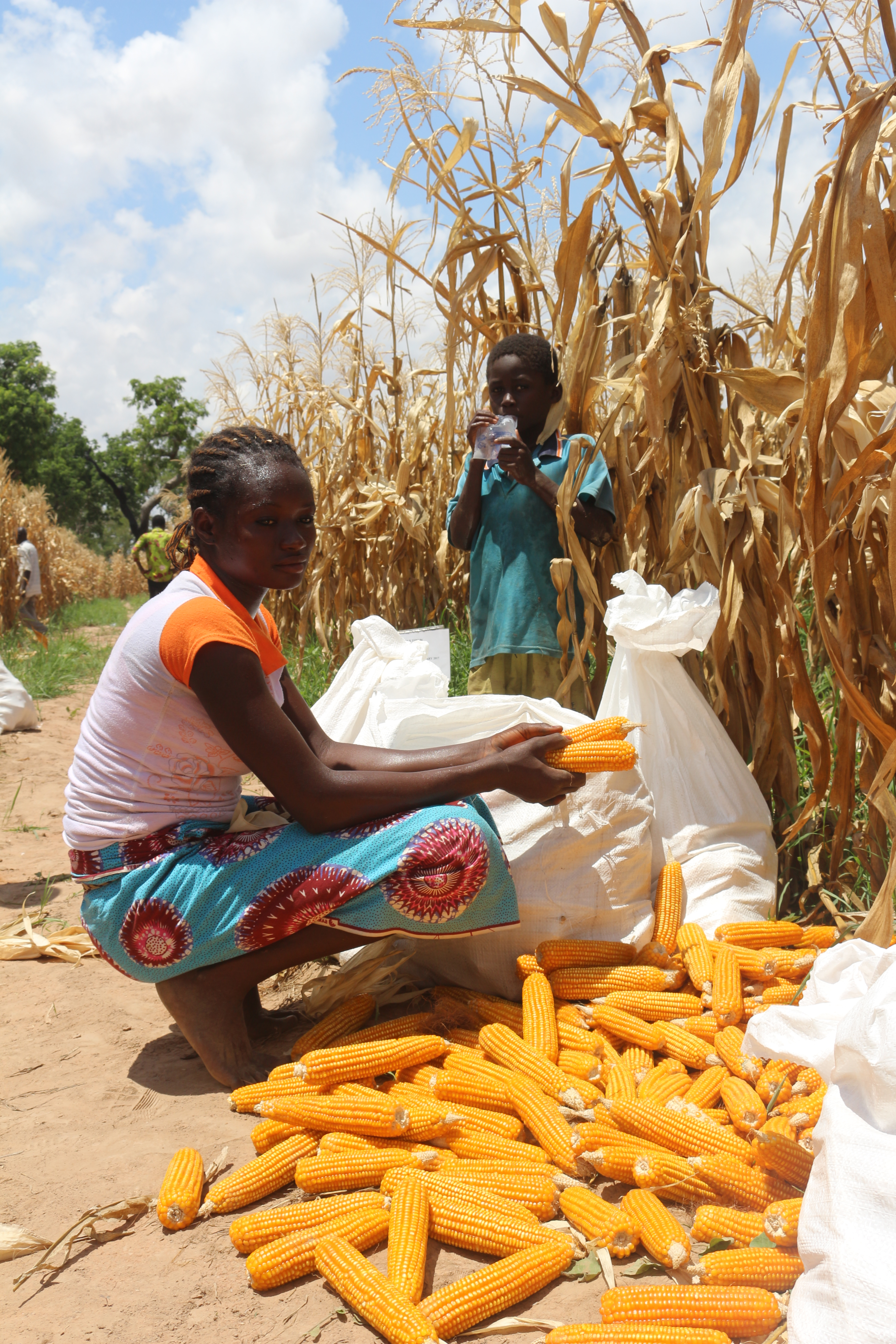
A maize farmer in Ghana

The main industrial crops are oil palm, cotton, rubber, sugar cane, tobacco, and kenaf, the latter used in the production of fiber bags. None is of strategic economic importance, and all, apart from oil palms. Despite claims that such crops could assist local industrialization efforts, the government has not focused the same attention on this sector as on export crops. For example, sugar cane output has diminished with the closure of the country's two sugar mills, which produced 237,000 tons per year in 1974–76, but only 110,000 tons in 1989.

The government has actually encouraged the export rather than the local processing of rubber, rehabilitating more than 3,000 hectares of plantations specifically for export production rather than revitalizing the local Bonsa Tire Company, which could produce only 400 tires per day in 1988 despite its installed capacity for 1,500 per day.

By the 1990s, the tobacco sector was expanding and moving toward higher export production. Ghana's dark-fired leaf probably grew too fast and required rich soil to compete effectively with rival crops, but the potential for flue-cured and Burley varieties is good. Pricing difficulties had reduced tobacco production from 3,400 tons in the early 1970s to an estimated 1,433 tons in 1989. Output began to improve in 1990, reaching 2,080 tons. In 2006–2007 BAT (British America Tobacco) shut down their Torikawa plant amid a social movement against tobacco smoking which resulted from high taxes caused by heavy tobacco smuggling.

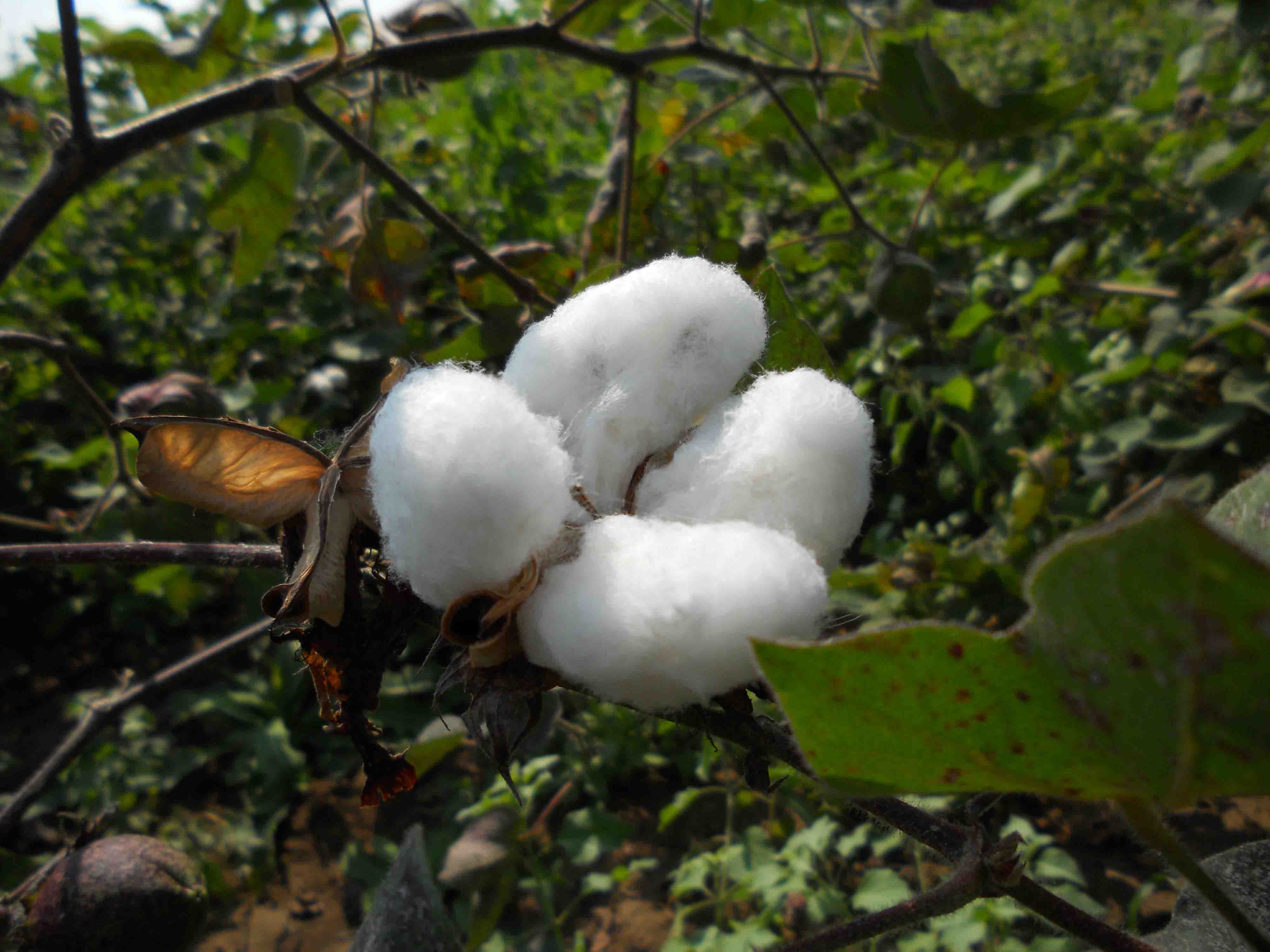
Cotton is a significant cash crop in Ghana

The Leaf Development Company was established in 1988 to produce tobacco leaf for the local market and to lay the basis for a future export industry. In 1991, the company's first commercial crop amounted to 300 tons of flue-cured, 50 tons of Burley, and 50 tons of dark-fired tobacco (all green leaf weights), of which 250 tons were exported, earning US$380,000. In 1991 Rothmans, the British tobacco company, acquired a 49.5 percent stake in the company and took over management of the Meridian Tobacco Company in partnership with the state-owned Social Security and National Insurance Trust. Another firm, the Pioneer Tobacco Company, announced a 92 percent increase in post-tax profits of more than ¢1 billion for 1991. The company declared dividends worth ¢360 million, double the amount paid out in 1990.

Cotton production expanded rapidly in the early and mid-1970s, reaching 24,000 tons in 1977, but it fell back to one-third of this figure in 1989. Since the reorganization of the Ghana Cotton Development Board into the Ghana Cotton Company, cotton production steadily increased from 4 percent of the country's national requirement to 50 percent in 1990. Between 1986 and 1989, Ghana saved US$6 million through local lint cotton production. The company expected that between 1991 and 1995, about 20,000 hectares of land would be put under cotton cultivation, enabling Ghana to produce 95 percent of the national requirement.

Shea Nuts from the shea tree is found predominantly in the Northern, Upper East and Upper West Regions of Ghana. Women are mostly engaged in fresh nut collection, nut processing and trading. More than 900,000 women in the three Northern Regions collect over 130,000 tons of dry nuts annually. The collection and processing of shea nuts is a major source of livelihood particularly for rural women in the region and also a way to reduce poverty. The leaves of the shea tree possess some medicinal values, as it is used to treat stomachaches in children. it is also used as vapor baths to treat headaches and for eye baths. The global trade in shea nuts has increased significantly in the last decade, and Ghana is one of the leading exporters of shea nuts and some other related products.

=== Food crops and livestock ===
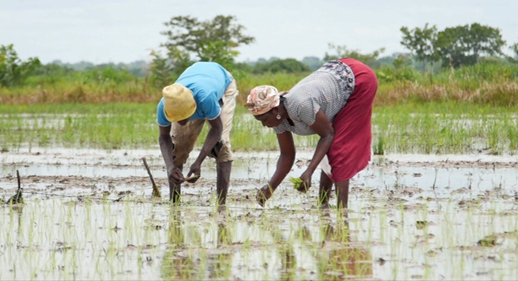
Rice plantation in Ghana

The main food crops are corn, yams, cassava and other root crops. Despite government efforts to encourage farmers to switch to production of staples, total food production fell by an average of 2.7 percent per year between 1971–73 and 1981–83. By 1983 Ghana was self-sufficient in only one staple food crop—plantains. Food imports rose from 43,000 tons in 1973 to 152,000 tons in 1981.

Those were various reasons for the declined performance, including growing urbanization and a shift in consumer preference from starchy home-grown staples to rice and corn. However, farmers also had to deal with shortages of production inputs, difficulties in transporting produce to market, and competition from imported foods that were underpriced because of the vastly overvalued Cedi. Weather also played a major part, particularly in 1983, when drought cut cereal production from 518,000 tons in 1982 to only 450,000 tons. Food imports in 1982–83 amounted to 115,000 tons, with the 1983–84 shortfall estimated at 370,000 tons. There was a spectacular improvement beginning in 1984, mainly because of recovery from the prior year's drought. By 1988 the agricultural sector had vastly expanded, with food crops responsible for the bulk of the increase. Drought conditions returned in 1990, bringing massive falls in the production of all food crops apart from rice, but better weather and improved production brought prices down in 1991.

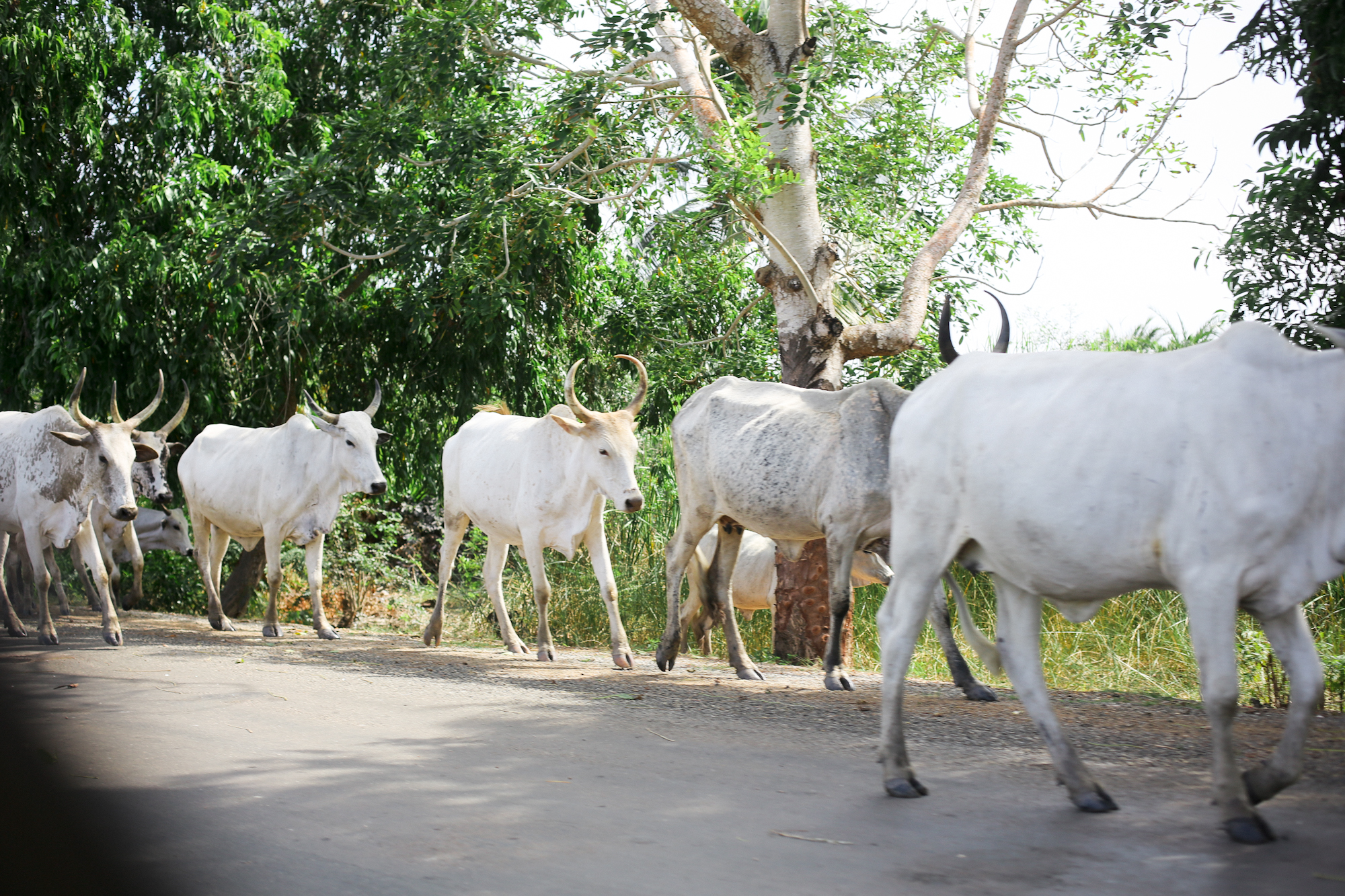
Herding Bovinae (cattle) in the Ashanti Region

In August 1990, the government moved to liberalize the agricultural sector, announcing the end of minimum crop prices. The measure's impact was difficult to gauge because higher production meant more food was available at better prices anyway. The government's medium-term plan, outlined in 1990, sought to raise average crop yields and to increase food security, with special attention to improved producer incentives and storage facilities.

Livestock production was limited by the incidence of tsetse fly in Ghana's forested regions and by low grazing vegetation elsewhere and it was of major importance only in the relatively arid north and was not earmarked for special treatment. In 1989 there were an estimated 1.2 million cattle, 2.2 million sheep, 2 million goats, 550,000 pigs and 8 million chickens in Ghana.

Cowpea (Vigna unguiculata) is a major crop here and so cowpea pests and diseases are a significant concern for the country. As of 2022 cowpea production has been declining for years and farming this crop has become increasingly unattractive due to pests and diseases. The pod borer Maruca vitrata is the most severe among those, with some farmers losing 90%. The government and various NGOs are promoting Bt cowpea as their pod borer-resistant variety of choice, and although it still needs regulatory approval as of 2022, farmers are eager for it and it is expected to be approved by 2024 or earlier. The ministry's IPM plan includes recommendations for this crop.

=== Forestry ===
Forestry products play an important part both in the subsistence economy and the export trade of many countries in West Africa. In Ghana, after cocoa and minerals, timber is the most valuable export. Ghana is one of the largest producers of hardwoods in the world. Several species of timber producing trees are exploited, the most popular being mahogany, wawa, sapele, odum (iroko).

Timber is exported mostly in the form of logs, although sawn timber and plywood also feature in the list of timber exports. Firewood, which is the main source of domestic fuel, is another important product of the forest. Other forest products include rubber-bearing plants, kola, teak and chewing stick.

=== Climate change and food production ===
Farmers in Ghana experimenting with new methods in order to reduce food spoilage after harvest (Voice of America)

Climate change affects food production, especially in the Dry Guinea Savannah spanning the three northern regions. Farmers continuously adapt their practices with the pursuit of weather and climate information for informed decision-making.

Initiatives like the Ghana Commercial Agriculture Project (GCAP) and the Food System Resilience Project (FSRP-2) have been crucial in supporting farmer adaptations and enhancing resilience to climate change. GCAP, with a $62 million investment, has upgraded irrigation and drainage over 7,391 hectares, improving water management and integrating climate information into farming practices. This has increased rice yields from 4.5 MT/ha to 5.5 MT/ha and strengthened farmers' ability to cope with climate variability.

== Transportation ==
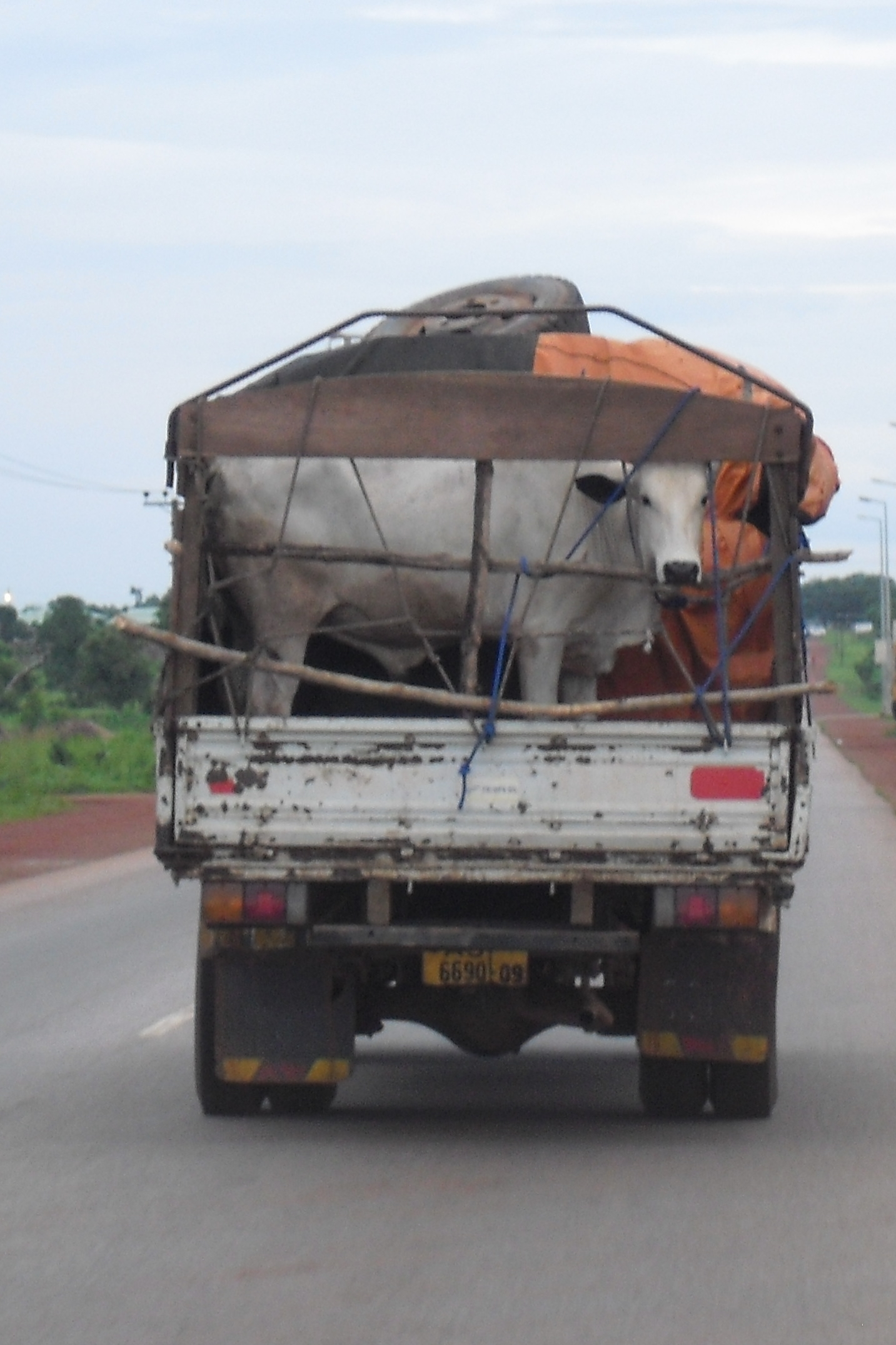
Zebu cattle being transported by road in the Northern Region

One of the challenges to Ghana's agricultural economy is its lack of transportation. Transportation is fundamental to the distribution of crops and livestock. Ghana has seen its economic growth slow down in recent years, particularly its agricultural market. Transportation helps farmers link their products to local consumers. It helps link rural communities to the marketplace, and increases economic productivity. It would help expand the market to the entire country, instead of local communities.

As of 2009, Ghana has a road network stretching 67,448 km (41,910 mi). 41% of the road network considered to be in decent condition, which is a major hindrance for the transport of agricultural products. Farmers in Ghana have complained about the country's lack of transportation. The World Bank strongly advised Ghana to drastically improve its transportation to improve its agriculture and economy. According to David Asare Asiamah (founder and CEO of AgroMindest), "Most of the farm produce just go to waste in the remote areas because farmers find it difficult transporting their farm produce to the market to sell. The roads don't exist and most remote areas find themselves cut off from the rest of the country. And because there are no proper storage facilities in these areas, a lot of the produce just rot away".

=== Improvements and Innovations in Transportation ===
The Ghana Commercial Agriculture Project (GCAP) also made substantial improvements to transportation infrastructure within agricultural regions. By building over 110 kilometers of access roads at the Kpong Irrigation Scheme (KIS), the project facilitated easier and more efficient transport of agricultural inputs and produce, thus supporting the economic viability of farming activities in the region.

There have been recent attempts to improve the transportation of agriculture in Ghana. In 2018, a Ghanaian startup, Agrocenta, won a 500,000 investment from Seedstars World. The role of Agrocenta is to use its online platform to connect local farmers to an online market. Trucks are then available to any farmer in small village with the click of a button. The company connects local farmers to buyers that purchase the goods at fair market prices.

== See also ==
- Economy of Ghana
- Fishing in Ghana
- Forestry in Ghana
- Salt industry in Ghana
- Chamber of Aquaculture
- Genetically modified food controversies in Ghana
