= Rice production in Ghana =

Cultivation of rice in Ghana

Rice production in Ghana is an important part of the country's agricultural sector. Rice (Oryza sativa) is grown in all of Ghana's agro-ecological zones and administrative regions, and has become one of the country's most important cereal crops alongside maize. Despite steady growth in output, domestic production has consistently fallen short of national demand, and Ghana remains a net importer of rice, meeting roughly half of its consumption through imports.

== History ==
Rice cultivation in West Africa long predates European contact; the African rice species Oryza glaberrima was domesticated in the region thousands of years ago, and mangrove-swamp rice-growing landscapes are associated with the histories of several pre-colonial West African states. Within the territory of modern Ghana, rice is recorded as a commercial food crop as early as the 17th and 18th centuries.

Rice did not become a major crop nationally until the 1960s, after which a significant share of the country's supply came from the Northern Region. Ghana experienced a rapid dietary shift toward rice, particularly in urban centres, during the early post-independence period. In 1989 the Ministry of Food and Agriculture initiated Valley Bottom Studies under the Agricultural Sector Review Project, coordinated by the Crop Research Institute, to assess the potential of inland swamps and valley bottoms for rice cultivation. Pilot sites were selected across the major agro-ecological zones, including Besease, Tolon/Yipeligu, Aframso and Gbi-Godenu. In July 2009 a five-year project for the sustainable development of rain-fed lowland rice production was launched as a technical cooperation between the Ministry of Food and Agriculture and the Japan International Cooperation Agency, aimed at smallholder farmers in the Ashanti and Northern regions.

== Production systems and geography ==
Rice is grown widely across Ghana using varieties adapted to the different agro-ecological zones. Production takes place under rain-fed and irrigated systems: rice is cropped once or twice yearly under rain-fed conditions and up to three cropping cycles per year under irrigation. According to the National Rice Development Strategy, nearly 80% of local rice is produced under lowland conditions by small-scale farmers.

Rice cultivation is concentrated in the northern part of the country and along the coastal savanna belt. The Northern, Volta and Upper East regions together account for the majority of national output. The Northern, Upper East and Upper West regions collectively account for roughly half of local production. The Coastal Savanna agro-ecological zone, comprising the Accra plains and parts of the Ho-Keta plains, is a major producing region where cultivation relies on high-input varieties grown under irrigation schemes supported by dams, pumps and water-channelling systems; average yields in these areas are among the highest in the country. Large irrigation projects such as the Tono Irrigation Project in the Upper East Region, constructed between 1975 and 1985, provide developed land for irrigated crops including rice.

Approximately 10% of farming households are thought to be employed by the rice industry. In 2020 the total rice cropping area was about 291,000 hectares, and with an estimated average household holding of 0.4 hectares this implied that roughly 597,500 households were involved in rice cultivation.

== Output and yields ==
Domestic rice production in Ghana grew at a rate of about 9.1% between 1973 and 2022. Production has grown steadily but has been driven more by expansion of cultivated land area than by increases in yield. In 2015 total production was about 400,000 metric tonnes, which fell short of local consumption by roughly 300,000 metric tonnes. By 2020 national output had risen to about 973,000 metric tonnes of paddy from a cropping area of about 291,000 hectares.

Average on-farm yields have remained well below their agronomic potential. In 2020 the average yield was about 3.3 tonnes per hectare against a potential of around 6.0 tonnes per hectare. Rice contributes an estimated 15% of Ghana's gross domestic product from the agricultural sector, but production is constrained by limited access to water, soil degradation, pest and disease pressures, and inefficient use of pesticides.

== Consumption and trade ==
Per capita consumption of milled rice in Ghana rose from about 13.3 kg per year in 1990 to about 32.0 kg per year in 2015, and one government source reported a further increase from 40.4 kg in 2016 to 51.5 kg in 2020, exceeding earlier projections. Rice has replaced maize as the primary cereal in Ghana, a shift attributed to urbanization, the relative ease of cooking rice, and changing consumer habits as incomes rise.

Because domestic supply has not kept pace with demand, Ghana imports a large share of the rice it consumes; in 2015 the country produced only about 57% of the rice it consumed. In 2021 Ghana imported around US$318 million of long-grain rice, principally from Vietnam, Thailand, India and China. Consumers frequently prefer imported rice over locally produced rice, citing taste, appearance, aroma, absence of foreign matter such as small stones, and packaging as key factors; aroma has been identified as the trait most preferred by farmers in some producing communities.

== Challenges ==
Local rice faces persistent competition from imported rice, which is often cheaper because of lower production costs abroad and is perceived as higher quality. A lack of suitable machinery and processing capacity negatively affects production, and many local mills lack graders, destoners, colour sorters and silos needed to raise quality to import-competitive levels. Other constraints include limited suitable rice cultivars for different ecological niches, poor-quality planting material owing to the absence of an organized seed system, weed and pest problems in valley bottoms and swamps, and post-harvest losses.

== Policy and development ==
To reduce dependence on imports and exposure to volatility in the international rice market, Ghana adopted a National Rice Development Strategy in 2009 (later revised). Rice was designated a priority crop under the Planting for Food and Jobs initiative launched by the Government of Ghana in 2017. Various programmes have sought to improve the taste and quality of local rice varieties, upgrade local processing, and raise consumer awareness of locally produced rice.

== See also ==
- Agriculture in Ghana
- Rice production in Nigeria
- African rice
- Economy of Ghana
