= Genetically modified food in Ghana =

Location of Ghana

Genetically Modified (GM) food crops were introduced into Ghana in 2013 after the 2011 Biosafety Act 831 permitted their introduction. By 2014, “confined field trials” of GM rice and cowpea in the Ashanti region and cotton in the three northern regions of the country were underway.

GM crops are controversial around the world for various reasons and Ghana is no exception. Groups against their introduction in Ghana include Food Sovereignty Ghana, The Coalition For Farmer’s Rights, Advocacy Against GMOs, Ghana Catholic Bishops’ Conference and the Convention People’s Party (CPP). They argue that genetically modified food is not conducive to good health and is neo-colonialist in nature. That is, it hands control of the food supply to rich nations, which threatens food sovereignty and the national interest.

Proponents of GM crops argue that the crops are engineered to resist common pests, increase yield, and hence lead to rising incomes for farmers and the country in general.

In 2015, a temporary injunction on any further Genetically Modified Organism (GMO) commercialization and development was put in place until the conclusion of the case brought by Food Sovereignty Ghana against the Ministry of Food and Agriculture. The trial has been severely protracted and testimonies from Jonathan Latham (of the Bioscience Resource Project) and TestBioTech took place in March and April 2022. Commercialization of Bt Cowpea is thus still pending approval, although imports of genetically engineered products to Ghana are still allowed.

== History of GMOs in Ghana ==
The National Seed Trade Association of Ghana (NASTAG), publicly advocates for the inclusion of GM seeds in Ghana, to aid agricultural development and mitigate the effects of climate change. NASTAG states that the use of GM seeds in this West Africa country will reduce the number of pesticides and time it takes for farmers to spray. In 2011, the Biosafety Act passed in Ghana, permitting the Council for Scientific and Industrial Research (CSIR) to conduct trials of specific GMOs. It is estimated that genetically modified cowpea, a GMO the CSIR has been experimenting with, will be on the market in Ghana in 2019.

In late 2017, the minister of Environment, Science, Technology, and Innovation Professor Kwabena Frimpong-Boateng, advocated for the people of Ghana to be educated on GM seeds and GMO products. Frimpong-Boateng believed that if the public knew more about GMO products, they would be more likely to accept and understand the importance of GMOs in assisting Ghana's economy and development.

In concurrence with the Frimpong-Boateng campaign for public education on GMO inclusion, Food Sovereignty Ghana filled suit against the National Biosafety Authority Board for its plans to proceed with the introduction of GM products on the local market.

== Plant Breeders Right Bill controversy ==
The Ghanaian Parliament is currently considering a bill that would protect the rights of scientists and corporations in relation to the creation of seeds or crops developed for Ghana. If passed, this bill could make Ghana dependent on certified seeds invented by MNCs and other seed producers, thus surrendering Ghana's food sovereignty to individuals and organizations. Activists believe this could hinder local farmers and cause local economic problems.

Pro Plant Breeders Right Bill opinions have indicated that GMOs and the bill are unrelated. Dr. Margaret Ottah Atikpo, head of the microbiology division of the Food Research Institute stated, "[The Bill] protects the breeders and brings royalty to the breeder and the country."
