= Ministry of Fisheries and Aquaculture Development =

Government ministry of Ghana

Agency overview
- Formed: Government of Ghana
- Jurisdiction: Government of Ghana
- Headquarters: Accra, Ghana
- Agency executive: Hon. Emelia Arthur, Minister
- Website: www.mofad.gov.gh

The Ministry of Fisheries and Aquaculture Development is a ministry in the Ghanaian government that concentrates on carrying out development interventions to move the fisheries sector and the industry to contribute efficiently to the overall development of the Ghanaian economy. This forms part of the 2014-2017 Sector Medium Term Development Plan.

The purpose serves as a sector "development compass" that directs or guides the operations of the Ministry, the private sector (fisheries industry players), and putting together agencies in the development of the fisheries sector. The ultimate goal of this Plan is to "consolidate the sector gains made' for the period 2010-2013, and to fast track the contribution of the fisheries sector to national development and growth through the implementation of target-specific and growth inducing strategies and interpositions". It is also a "medium term road map" that is directed at guiding Government investment and Development Partner support to revamp the fisheries sector for 2014-2017 and the years ahead.

== Goals and policy ==
The mission of the Ministry of Fisheries and Aquaculture Development is promotion of accelerated Fisheries Sector Development as a viable economic segment that will conduce to the total development of the economy of Ghana in line with Medium to Long term National Development Policy Frameworks of the country.

The main objective of the plan is to enhance operational effectiveness and efficiency of the ministry and its partners towards the achievement of stated sector policy objectives and time-bound targets, output and outcomes of the fisheries sector that are in line with the total medium term evolution goals and policy objectives of the Ghana Shared Growth and Development Agenda.

The ideas gained from the goals of the ministry derived its policy base from the thematic focus areas and broad policy objectives and strategies of growth and development agenda that are relevant to its mandate and functions.

== Leadership ==
The ministry consists of several departments and agencies. In total, the ministry is headed by a sector minister, and each agency or department has a director as an official head. In view of this, the Fisheries Commission is the implementing agency of the Ministry of Fisheries and Aquaculture Development and is headed by the Director of the Fisheries Commission.

== Divisions ==
The commission has five divisions:

A. Marine Fisheries Management Division

B. Inland Fisheries Management Division

C. Fisheries Scientific Survey Division

D. Monitoring, Control, and Surveillance Division

E. Operations and Administration Divisions

== Units ==
The commission has four operational units:

A. Fish Health Unit

B. Monitoring and Evaluation Unit

C. Post-Harvest Unit

D. Projects Unit

== National Premix Secretariat ==
The National Premix Committee was constituted by the government of Ghana in July 2009 to oversee the administration and distribution of premix fuel, a hugely subsidised petroleum product in the country.

Landing beach committees were established at the various landing beaches to empower the fishermen to operate premix fuel stations at the landing beaches. Each landing beach committee was required to choose an Oil Marketing Company to supply them with premix fuel. Proceeds from the sale of premix fuel at the landing beaches are to be used in developing the fishing communities in the country.

A National Premix Secretariat was formed to service the National Premix Committee. The allotment and distribution of premix fuel is undertaken by the secretariat. Requests made weekly for the distribution of premix fuel are sent to the Tema Oil Refinery, which refines and loads the product into tankers of the assigned oil marketing companies for distribution to the various Landing Beach Committees.

=== Mandate ===
The National Premix Committee's responsibility is to supervise the efficient and effective administration and distribution of premix fuel. Since premix fuel is highly subsidized by the government, the National Premix Committee makes sure that monitoring is enforced to avoid diversion or inappropriate distribution. The National Premix Committee is tasked to ensure that the proceeds from the sale of premix fuel are being used to develop the fishing communities in the country. Diverse developmental projects were undertaken by majority of the landing beach committeeCs.

== Directorates ==
The following are directorates of the Ministry of Fisheries and Aquaculture Development, with each directorate headed by a director.

- Internal Audit
- Finance and Administration
- Human Resource
- Research, Statistics, and Information Management
- Policy Planning, Monitoring, and Evaluation

== Collaborating ministries, departments, agencies, and institutions ==
The Ministry of Fisheries and Aquaculture Development and its agencies (the Fisheries Commission and the National Premix Secretariat) work hand in hand with over 80% of the Ministries in Ghana and other entities in order to develop a reliable, disciplined, manageable, and sustainable fisheries sector for Ghanaians.

== Laws and regulations ==
The Ministry of Fisheries and Aquaculture Development was formed under the 1992 Constitution of the republic of Ghana. It takes into consideration the Fisheries (Amendment) Regulations, 2015 (L.I. 2217).

== See also ==
- Fishing in Ghana
- Economy of Ghana
- Government of Ghana
- Ministry of Food and Agriculture
