= Genetically modified bean =

A genetically modified bean (GM bean) is a bean that has undergone changes in its genetic material through genetic engineering techniques, providing desirable traits such as resistance to pests and diseases or improved nutritional and digestive quality.

The world's first commercialized genetically modified bean, registered as BRS FC401 RMD, was developed entirely by Brazilian public research institutions, Embrapa, and was approved for cultivation in 2011, with commercialization beginning in 2015. It is a Pinto bean variety resistant to the bean golden mosaic virus (BGMV). Genetically modified cowpeas have been developed to express the cry protein from Bacillus thuringiensis, which is toxic to lepidopteran species, particularly to the pod borer (Maruca vitrata), a pest that can cause yield losses of up to 80%. These technologies have benefited farmers by providing greater profitability, higher yields, and reduced pesticide use.

== Examples of transgenic bean ==
=== BGMV-resistant bean ===
The common bean (Phaseolus vulgaris) is one of the most important foods in Brazil, serving as a source of protein, carbohydrates, and micronutrients, in addition to having long shelf life and being easy to prepare. Production takes place over three annual harvests, mainly in the states of Paraná, Minas Gerais, Bahia, São Paulo, and Goiás. However, pests, diseases, drought, and low soil fertility affect productivity, with the bean golden mosaic virus (BGMV), transmitted by the whitefly (Bemisia tabaci), being the main threat to the crop, capable of causing yield losses of up to 100% in affected areas. Chemical control proved to be largely ineffective, and conventional breeding programs failed to produce resistant cultivars. In 2004, the research team led by Aragão and Faria developed the first bean plant immune to BGMV using the siRNA strategy, selecting line 5.1, which underwent greenhouse and field trials as well as biosafety assessments. The studies confirmed food safety, nutritional equivalence, and the absence of environmental impacts, and in 2011 the National Technical Biosafety Commission (CTNBio) approved its commercial release, the first commercialized transgenic bean in the world, developed by a public institution. Regulatory requirements delayed its market introduction, but by 2015 commercial cultivars of the Pinto bean variety were already available, showing an average productivity 20% higher and profits up to 78% greater in affected areas, in addition to total immunity to the virus and reduced insecticide use. The official market launch took place only in 2020, after seed multiplication and commercial planning strategies, and initial farmer acceptance was positive. For consumers, expectations point to adoption rates similar to those of other GMO products on the market. Since Pinto beans are intended for domestic consumption, the process was facilitated, while export-oriented varieties such as black turtle beans remain outside the market.

==== Methods ====
Since the 1960s, Embrapa had been searching for bean varieties resistant to the bean golden mosaic virus (BGMV), but only found cultivars with partial resistance that were poorly adapted to Brazil, which led to a focus on biotechnology in the 1990s. After unsuccessful attempts using strategies such as antisense RNA and lethal transdominance, the solution emerged in the early 2000s with RNA interference (RNAi), a natural plant defense mechanism that silences genes. By inserting a fragment of viral DNA into the bean genome, scientists were able to make the plant produce small RNA molecules (siRNA) capable of blocking the gene essential for viral replication, functioning as a “vaccine” against BGMV. This process enhances an existing system in the plant, allowing the defense to be activated immediately upon infection; moreover, it was observed that insect vectors reduce their viral load when feeding on transgenic beans, and even neighbouring conventional crops can benefit indirectly.

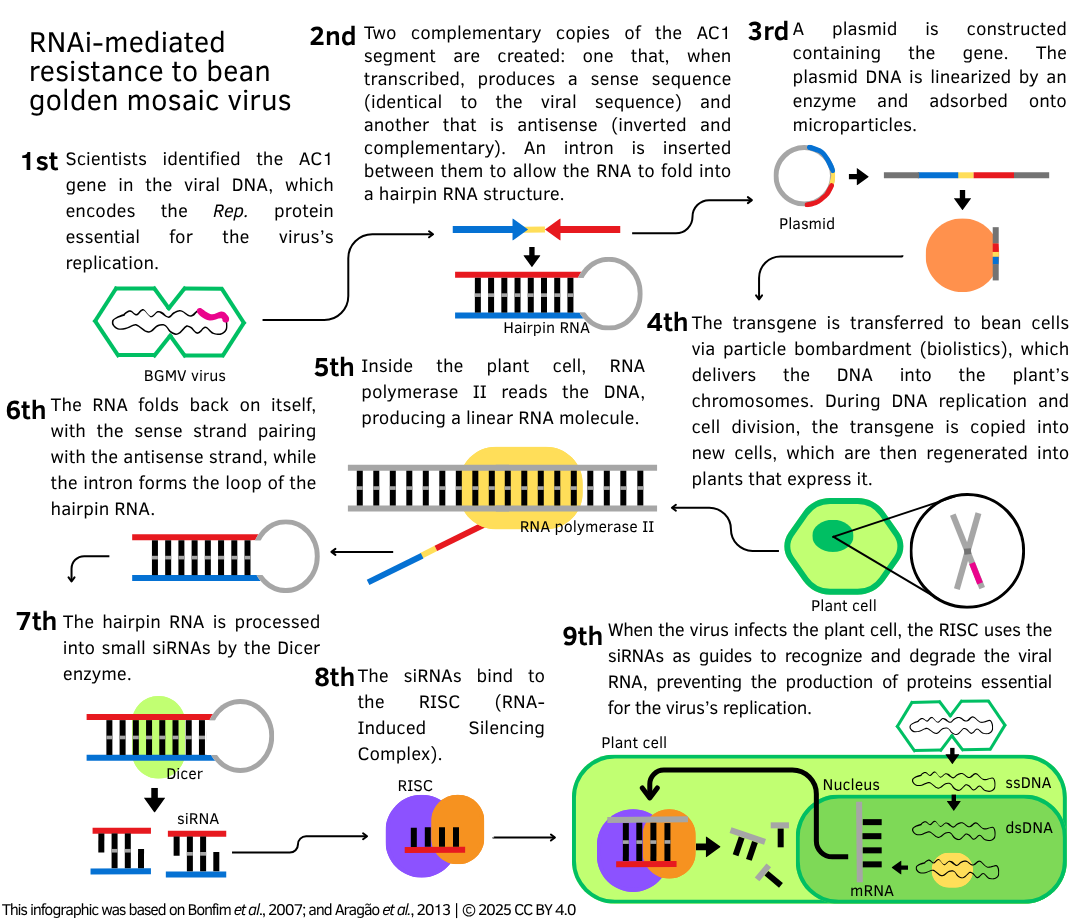
Process developed by Aragão and Faria's team to create a transgenic bean resistant to bean golden mosaic virus using RNA interference (RNAi) technology.

=== Bt cowpea ===
Genetically modified cowpea varieties have been developed and approved for cultivation in African countries such as Nigeria, in 2019, and Ghana, in 2024. These varieties have also been investigated in other countries, such as Burkina Faso. They express the cry protein from Bacillus thuringiensis, which is toxic to lepidopteran species, particularly to the pod borer (Maruca vitrata), a pest that can cause yield losses of up to 80%.

== Safety ==
There is a scientific consensus that currently available food derived from GM crops poses no greater risk to human health than conventional food, but that each GM food needs to be tested on a case-by-case basis before introduction. Nonetheless, members of the public are much less likely than scientists to perceive GM foods as safe. The legal and regulatory status of GM foods varies by country, with some nations banning or restricting them, and others permitting them with widely differing degrees of regulation.
