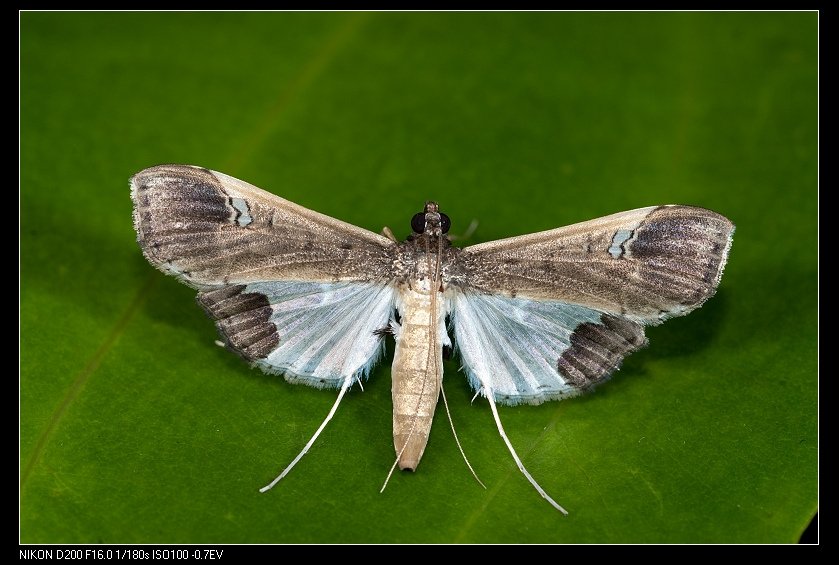

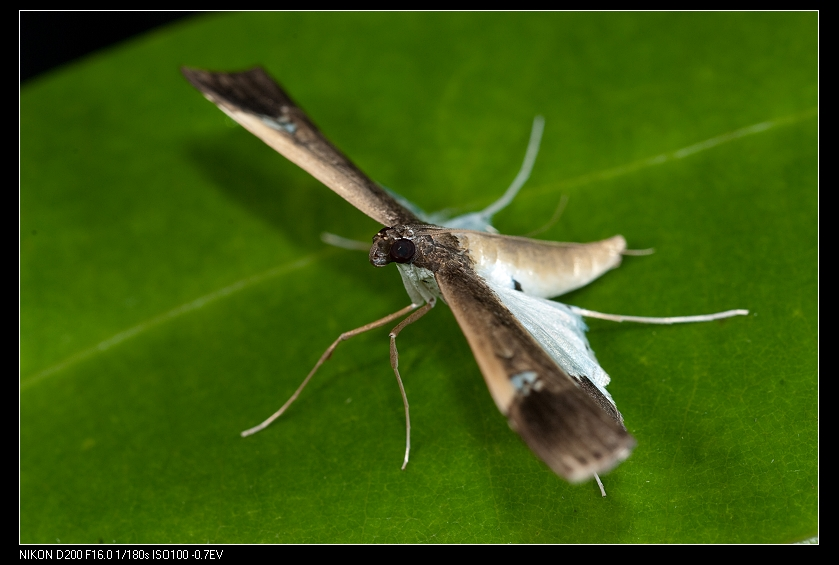

Scientific classification
- Kingdom: Animalia
- Phylum: Arthropoda
- Class: Insecta
- Order: Lepidoptera
- Family: Crambidae
- Genus: Maruca
- Species: M. amboinalis

Binomial name
- Maruca amboinalis (C. Felder, R. Felder & Rogenhofer, 1875)

Synonyms
- Siriocauta amboinalis C. Felder, R. Felder & Rogenhofer, 1875; Siriocauta simialalis Snellen, 1880

= Maruca amboinalis =

Species of moth

Maruca amboinalis is a moth in the family Crambidae. It was described by Cajetan von Felder, Rudolf Felder and Alois Friedrich Rogenhofer in 1875. It is found in Indonesia (Ambon Island, Sumatra), Taiwan and Japan.

The larvae feed on Pongamia pinnata.
