= Maruca nigroapicalis =

Scientific classification
- Kingdom: Animalia
- Phylum: Arthropoda
- Class: Insecta
- Order: Lepidoptera
- Family: Crambidae
- Genus: Maruca
- Species: M. nigroapicalis

Binomial name
- Maruca nigroapicalis de Joannis, 1930

Species of moth

Maruca nigroapicalis is a moth in the family Crambidae. It was described by Joseph de Joannis in 1930. It is found in Vietnam.
