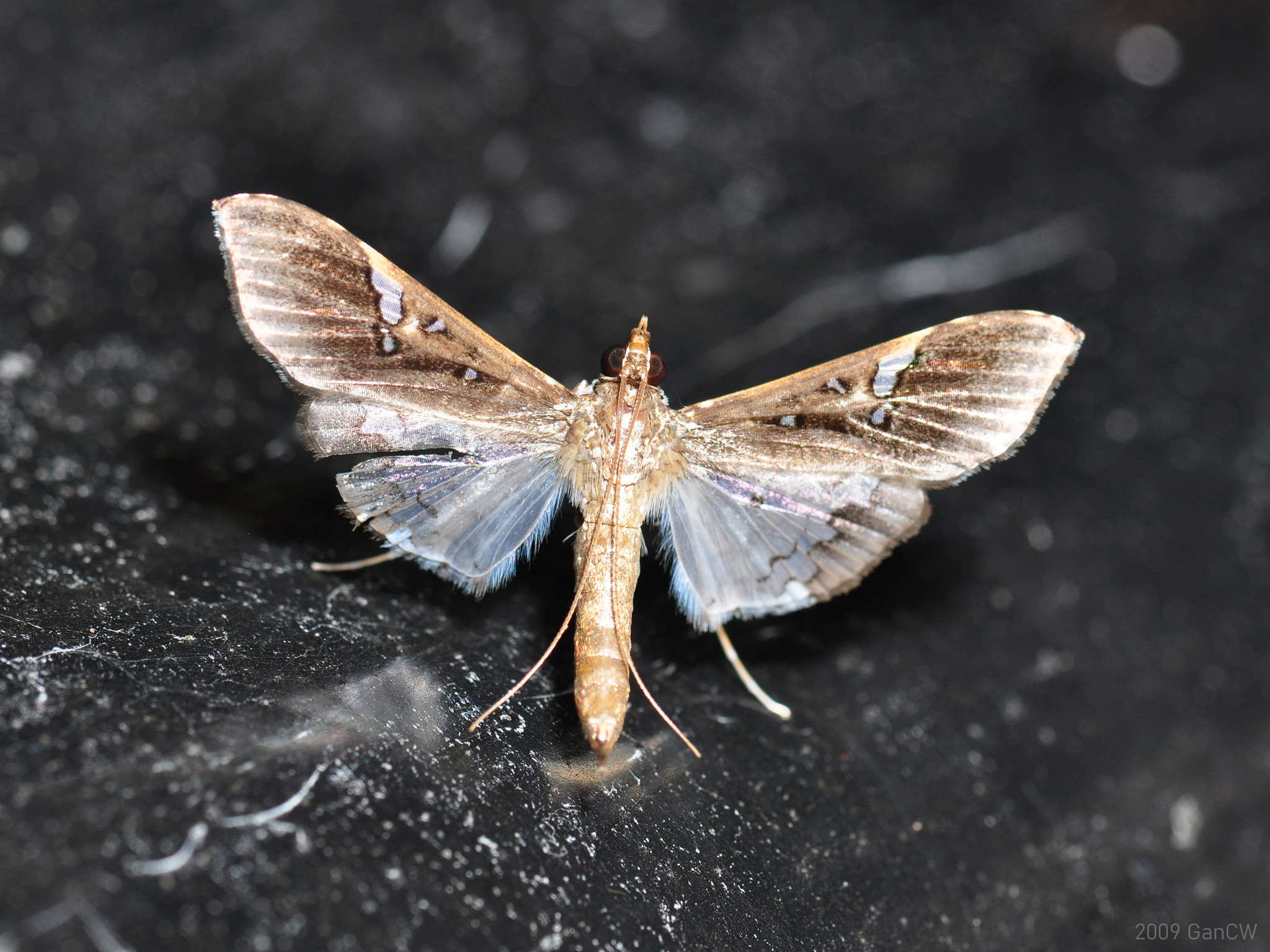

Scientific classification
- Kingdom: Animalia
- Phylum: Arthropoda
- Class: Insecta
- Order: Lepidoptera
- Family: Crambidae
- Genus: Maruca
- Species: M. fuscalis

Binomial name
- Maruca fuscalis Yamanaka, 1998

= Maruca fuscalis =

Species of moth

Maruca fuscalis is a moth in the family Crambidae. It was described by Hiroshi Yamanaka in 1998. It is found on Sulawesi in Indonesia.
