= Rice production in Nigeria =

Cultivation of rice in Nigeria

Rice production in Nigeria is a major component of the country's agriculture. Rice is a staple food in Nigeria and is cultivated in virtually all of the country's agro-ecological zones, though mostly on a relatively small scale. In 2002, Nigeria accounted for nearly 44% of total rice output and 57% of the total rice-producing area in West Africa, although yields have remained low even by West African standards. Domestic production has historically fallen short of consumption, and Nigeria has been one of the world's largest importers of milled rice.

== History ==
African rice (Oryza glaberrima) is indigenous to Nigeria and has been cultivated there for approximately 3,500 years. Cultivation of improved Asian rice (Oryza sativa) varieties began around 1890 with the introduction of upland varieties to the high forest zone of western Nigeria. By 1960, O. sativa had largely displaced O. glaberrima, which is now limited to deep-flooded plains of the Sokoto–Rima river basin and other isolated pockets of deep swamp.

The Abakaliki area of southeastern Nigeria became a significant rice-growing and milling centre in the mid-twentieth century. By 1959, about 20,000 acres were under rice cultivation around Abakaliki, served by some 95 rice mills, while a further 18,000 acres were cultivated in the Afikpo area.

== Production ==
Rice in Nigeria is grown in paddies or on upland fields depending on the variety, with limited mangrove cultivation; new varieties are developed and disseminated by research institutes or imported from Asia. Production is concentrated in particular geographic areas, notably the Middle Belt and the lowlands and floodplains adjacent to the Niger and Benue rivers, a pattern reinforced by the location of processing and marketing chains. Much of the rice grown in the Middle Belt comes from Benue, Kaduna, Kano, Niger and Taraba states, with Ebonyi, Ekiti and Ogun also being significant producers.

== Trade and marketing ==
Locally produced rice faces competition from imported rice, which is favoured for its long white grains and freedom from small stones that can become mixed with local grain during processing, reducing its marketability. The Nigerian government has at various times imposed restrictions on rice imports in an effort to stimulate domestic production.

== See also ==
- Agriculture in Nigeria
- Rice production in Ghana
