= Salt industry in Ghana =

Salt Industry

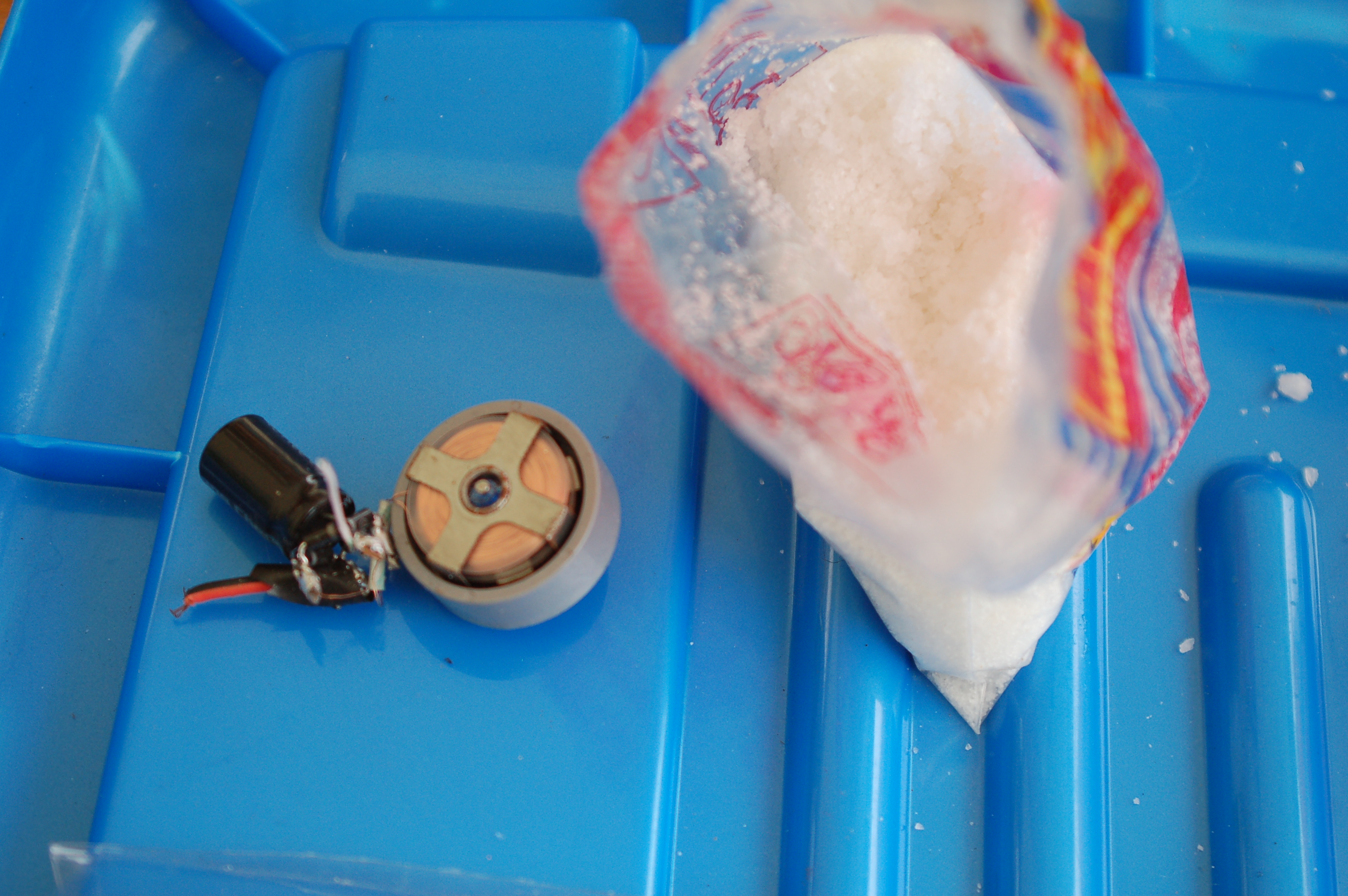
Ghanaian salt

The Ghanaian salt industry as of 2009 produced between 250,000 and 300,000 tonnes of salt annually. The Ghana Export Promotion Authority (GEPA) has identified the sector as an important one to aid the diversification of Ghana's economy, and the Ghanaian government is currently within the process of developing the industry.

== Economic benefits ==
Ghana has the production potential of 2.2 million tonnes of salt annually. Economists in Ghana believe the nation's salt industry represents a potential source of revenue from Nigerian purchasers who currently rely on Brazilian imports.

The GEPC has requested that the Commonwealth Secretariat establish a framework in Ghana to coordinate the development of the salt sector in the country. As a result, a team of consultants has conducted many interviews and seminars and undertaken market analysis with a realistic strategy and targets. While developers realise that Ghana will never be a leading world producer, the proponents believe that the development of the salt industry in Ghana will be important to the economy and the overall economic development of western Africa in supply. The salt can also be used to make chemical products which historically western Africa has not been capable of making. In 2002, the Minister of Mines, Kwadwo Adjei-Darko spoke at a salt mining site in Mendskrom, near the Weija Barrier, about increasing production in Ghana:

"Besides, it is equally important that we add value to the salt and think of converting it into other chemical products to enable us meet international competitors like Brazil and Australia who have dominated the West African market. Our capacity is low, sometimes let us involve partnership, which would be of interest to the nation. If we developed the salt industry through the private sector, it could become a major exporting commodity that would bring in more foreign exchange for Ghana, which may even superseded what Nigeria is earning in oil today."

== Extraction ==
In Ghana, as in many countries, the most common method of salt extraction, being the most cost-effective and productive, is solar evaporation, using brine from the sea, marine lagoons or underground wells or boreholes. One of Ghana's signature salt industrialists, Crown Sea Salt Limited, uses solar evaporation of seawater and is currently developing and testing new technologies to reduce production cost and improve on consistent product quality. Pambros Salt Production Limited, the largest salt producer in western Africa (producing 350,000 tonnes of salt in Ghana and Senegal in 2002) have aspirations to capitalize on government support and investment in increasing production to capacity.
