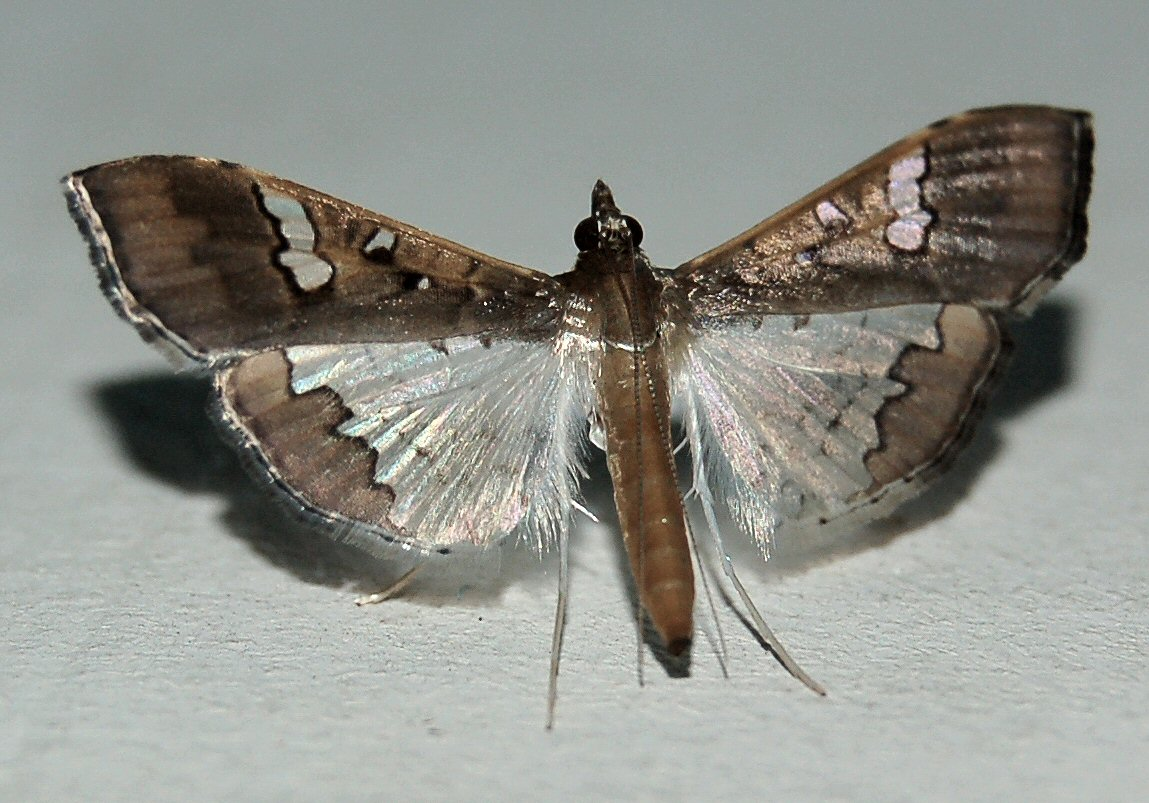
- Maruca vitrata

Scientific classification
- Kingdom: Animalia
- Phylum: Arthropoda
- Class: Insecta
- Order: Lepidoptera
- Family: Crambidae
- Tribe: Margaroniini
- Genus: Maruca; Walker, 1859

Synonyms
- Maruea Walker, 1859; Siriocauta Lederer, 1863

= Maruca =

Bean pod borer

Genus of moths

Maruca is a genus of moths of the family Crambidae, commonly known as bean pod borers.

== Species ==
- Maruca amboinalis (C. Felder, R. Felder & Rogenhofer, 1875)
- Maruca fuscalis Yamanaka, 1998
- Maruca nigroapicalis de Joannis, 1930
- Maruca vitrata (Fabricius, 1787)
