= Chamber of Aquaculture =

Ghanaian professional association

The Ghana Chamber of Aquaculture (frequently just Chamber of Aquaculture) is a Ghanaian professional association focused on the promotion and dissemination of information about Aquaculture in Ghana. The organization is a local member of the sustainable aquaculture advocacy program from the World Economic Forum called the Blue Food Partnership. The organization advocates for change in policy, in part because of the National Aquaculture plan advanced by the national government. The organization runs an awards ceremony for organizations involved in aquaculture in Ghana.

After a controlled spill in the Volta River in 2023, the organization worked with the Volta River Authority to improve farming practices to prevent damage and fish release during extreme events.
