= Fishing industry in Ghana =

Overview of fishing in Ghana

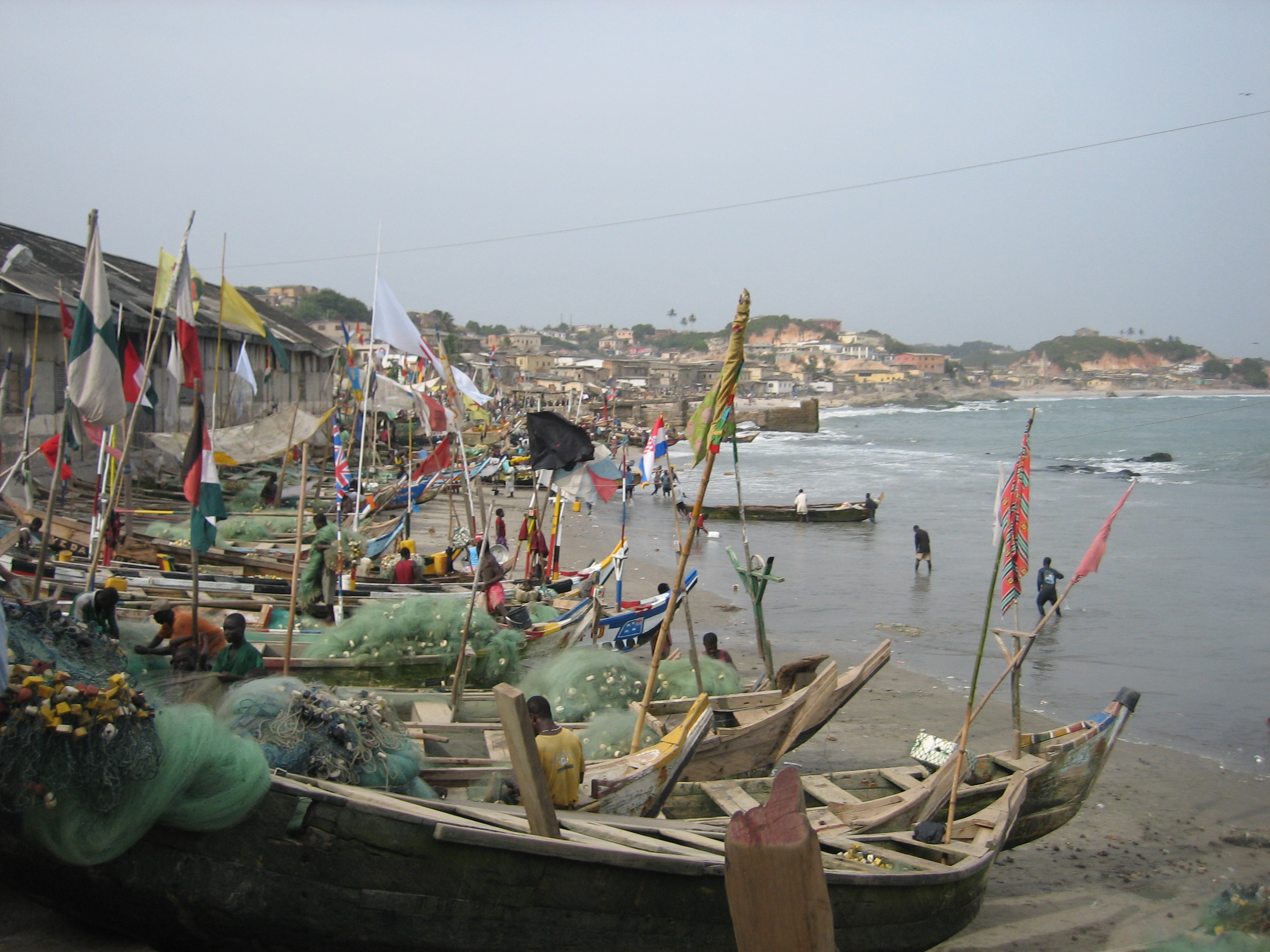
Fishing vessels at Cape Coast.

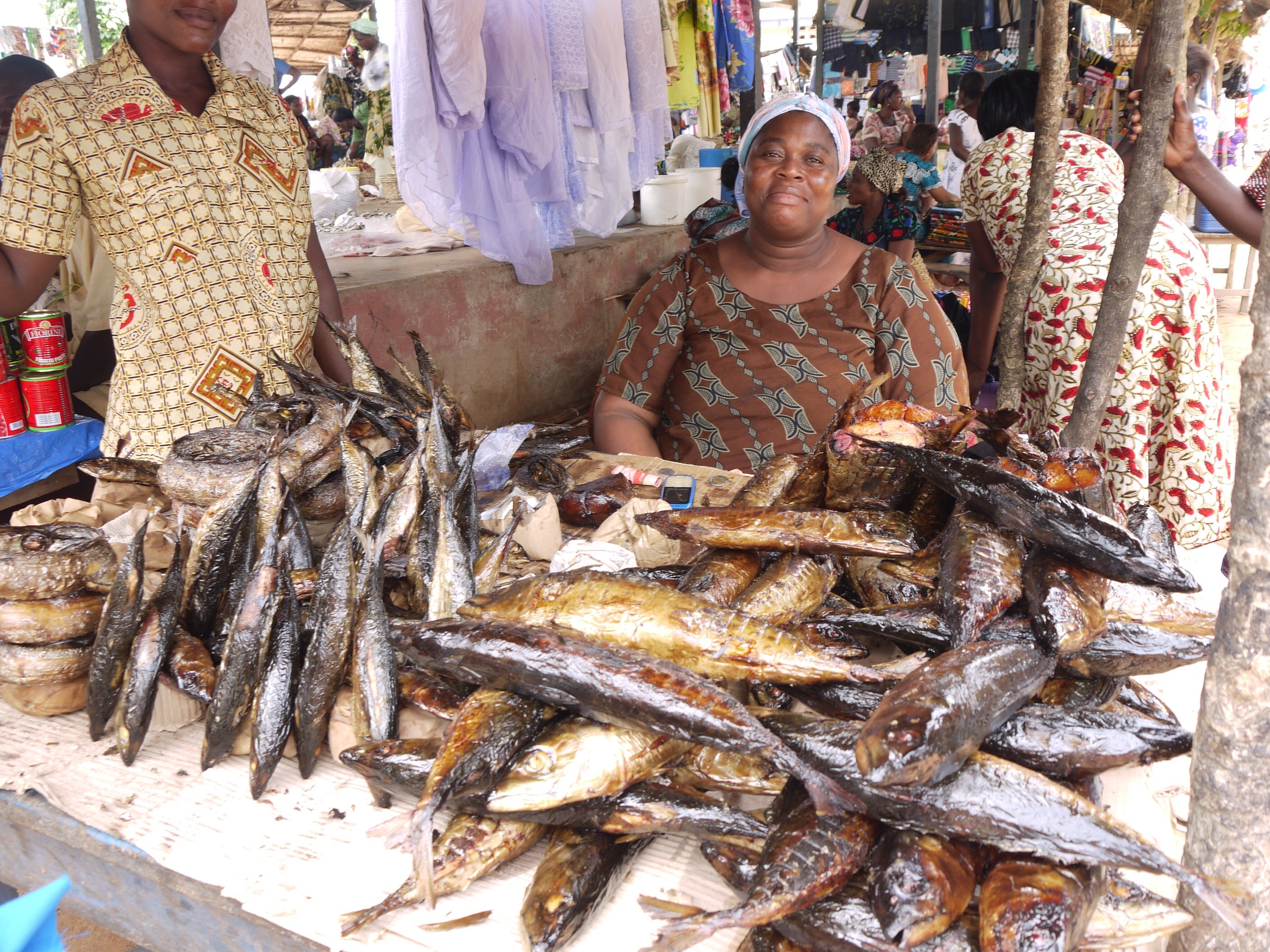
Fish seller in Vendor at Nyakrom fish market in Agona District.

Fishing in Ghana is made up of both ocean caught fish, as well as freshwater fishing in lakes and rivers. The fishing industry has been expanding due to increased interest by the government and substantial cage farming in the Volta Basin.

== History ==
The fishing industry's total catch increased considerably in the late 1960s, from 105,100 tons of marine fish caught in 1967 to 230,100 tons in 1971. In 1982 the yield was 234,100 tons, composed of 199,100 tons of marine varieties and 35,000 tons of freshwater fish from Lake Volta. The industry was hit by fuel shortages, inadequate storage facilities, and the general economic difficulties of the 1970s and the 1980s. In 1988 the fish catch was 302,900 tons. In 1991 the catch was 289,675 tons, down from more than 319,000 tons in 1990. In 2025 data from Ghana’s Ministry of Fisheries and Aquaculture indicated that Ghana’s seafood exports have reached more than $425 million annually.

Large-scale poaching by foreign vessels has severely depleted fish stocks in Ghana's 200-nautical-mile (370 km) maritime Exclusive Economic Zone, causing major government concern. The most affected stocks are sea bottom-feeding fish. Tuna stocks reportedly remain unaffected. A 1992 Ministry of Food and Agriculture report recommended that the government accelerate mobilization of surveillance and enforcement units and step up regulation of trawler fleets.

In 1992 the government passed a fisheries law to curb overfishing and to help protect the marine environment. Fishermen were banned from catching specified shellfish, and all fishing vessel operators were required to obtain licenses. The law provided for a regulatory body—the Fisheries Monitoring, Control, Surveillance, and Enforcement Unit—as well as a fisheries advisory council. These organizations, however, both of which are underfunded and undermanned, are unlikely to stop illegal fishing activities anytime soon.

Pollution in Ghana’s marine environment has become a serious problem, greatly harming the fishing industry. Fishermen often come back from the sea with little to no catch, sometimes finding their nets full of trash instead of fish. Plastic waste, sewage, and chemicals dumped into the sea are driving the fish away.

In 2025 the government signed a new fisheries and aquaculture law to protect local fishermen from large industrial trawlers and suspended licenses of four Chinese vessels. Since 2010, average annual income per artisanal canoe has dropped by as much as 40 percent, and 90 percent of small-scale fishers have reported declining catches.

== Kinds of Fishing ==
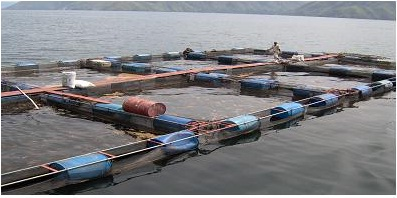
A tilapia culturing cage on the Volta Lake.

- Industrial Fishing
- Marine Artisanal fishing
- Inland Canoe Fishing

Industrial and artisanal fishermen fish the ocean. Artisanal fishing are small scale fishing practices undertaken by households or individuals.

The Volta Lake is the main source of inland fishery in Ghana.

The potential of aquaculture in Ghana is important, the actual estimated production reached about 9,000 tons mainly with Tilapia production. The potential for cage culturing for tilapia is steadily increasing.

== Fishing Communities ==
Some Fishing Communities in Eastern Region include:

- Sumuner
- Odortorm
- Petefour
- Odomeabra
- Nketepa
- Nrahponya
- Adakope
- Adakope
- Troameleveme
- Gonyokope
- Agaradzi
- Abuakwa
- Kwahu East

These communities are heavily rely on fish for sustenance, income and food security .

== Inland Fishing Centers in Ghana ==
- Lake Volta
- Bosomtwi
- Weija
- Barekese
- Tano
- Oti
- Afram
- Bortianor (Tsokome)
- Faana Village Beach
- Oshie
- Korkrobite
- Pra
- Densu
- Vea
- Kpong

== Contribution of Fishing towards the Ghanaian Economy ==
The Fishing sector of the country plays an important role contributing significantly to national economic development objectives related to employment, livelihood support, poverty reduction, food security, foreign exchange earnings and resource sustainability. The sector is estimated to contribute 3% of the total GDP and 5% of the GDP in agriculture. About 10% of the country's population is engaged in various aspects of the fishing industry.

== Future Plans For the Ghanaian Fishing Industry ==
The current president of Ghana, Nana Akuffo Addo, created a ministry of fisheries and agricultural development in Ghana. On the 9th of April 2018, The current Minister of the Fishery sector in Ghana, Francis Kinsley Ato Cudjoe, announced the “One house, one tank” program which is bound to take effect from May. With this, every house is to own one fish tank. This goes a long way to encourage tank farming across the nation. Again, the encouragement of youth programs to encourage fish farming as a means of reducing the estimated 930,000 metric tons of fishes being imported annually.

== See also ==
- Agriculture in Ghana
- Economy of Ghana
