= Pambros Salt =

Salt company in Ghana

Panbros Salt Production Limited is a Ghana-based salt production company known for being the largest salt producer in West Africa. The company was established in 1958 by Gerasimos Panagiotopoulos a Greek national and is located in Mendskrom, Ghana.

== Processing ==
Salt ponds are constructed through dugout facilities using pumps. Seawater channeled through the pipes are directed to salt ponds where the water sits for some time before evaporating. The salt crystals that are formed are then collected, treated, processed, bagged and sold to the Ghanaian market and other West African countries.
