= Bioscience Resource Project =

Organization

- Type: 501(c)(3) educational nonprofit
- Focus: Science, Food and Agriculture, Health, Environment, Biotechnology, Biosafety
- Established: 2006
- Location: Ithaca, New York
- Key people: Jonathan Latham, PhD, Executive Director; and co-founder Allison Wilson, PhD, Science Director
- Websites: http://www.bioscienceresource.org/ http://independentsciencenews.org/

The Bioscience Resource Project is an advocacy organization focused on agriculture-related biosciences since 2006. In 2011, they started the Independent Science News website.

== See also ==
=== Other organizations ===
- Center for Food Safety
- Center for Science in the Public Interest
- Pesticide Action Network
- Physicians for Social Responsibility
- Union of Concerned Scientists
