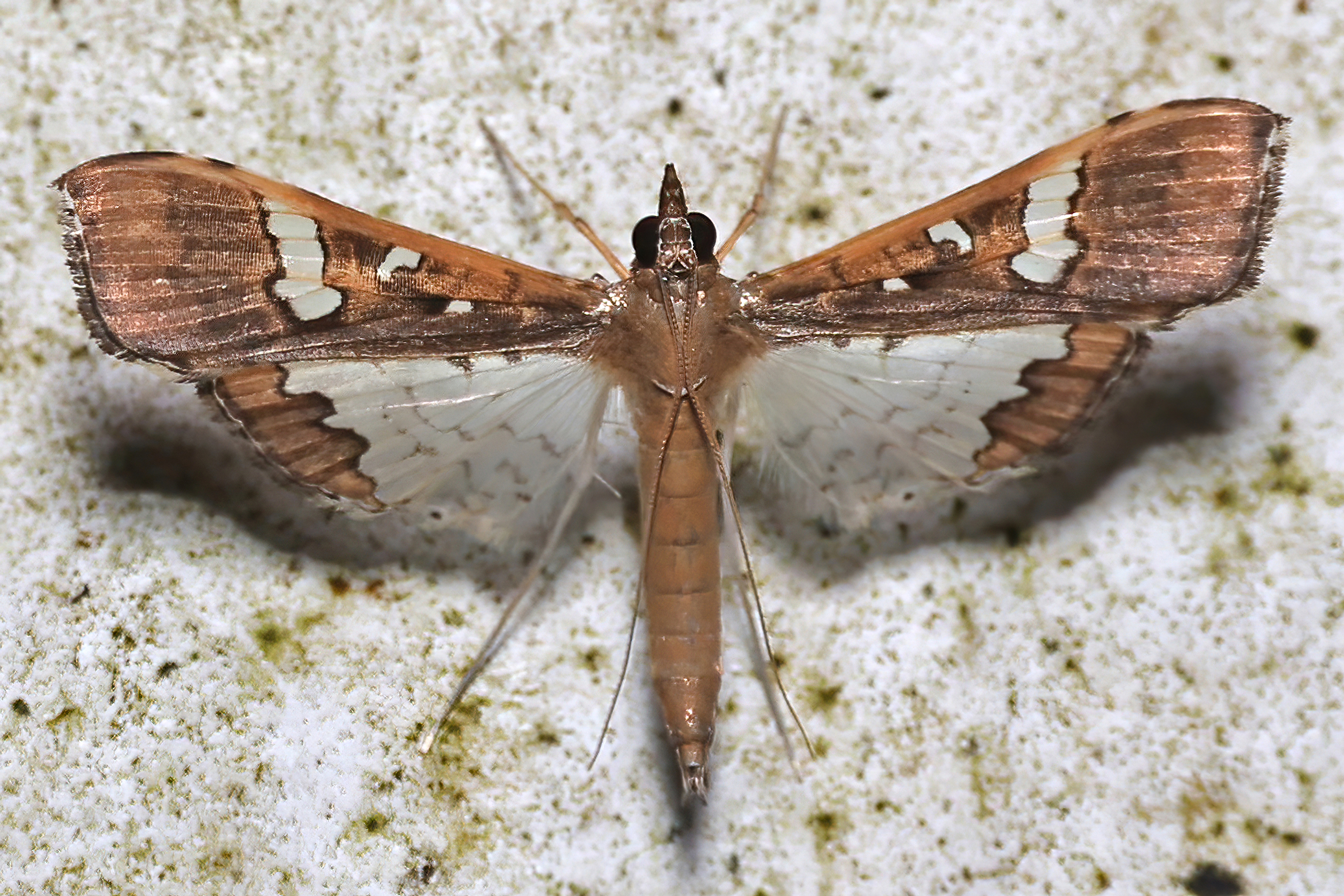
- Sinharaja Forest, Viharahena, Sri Lanka
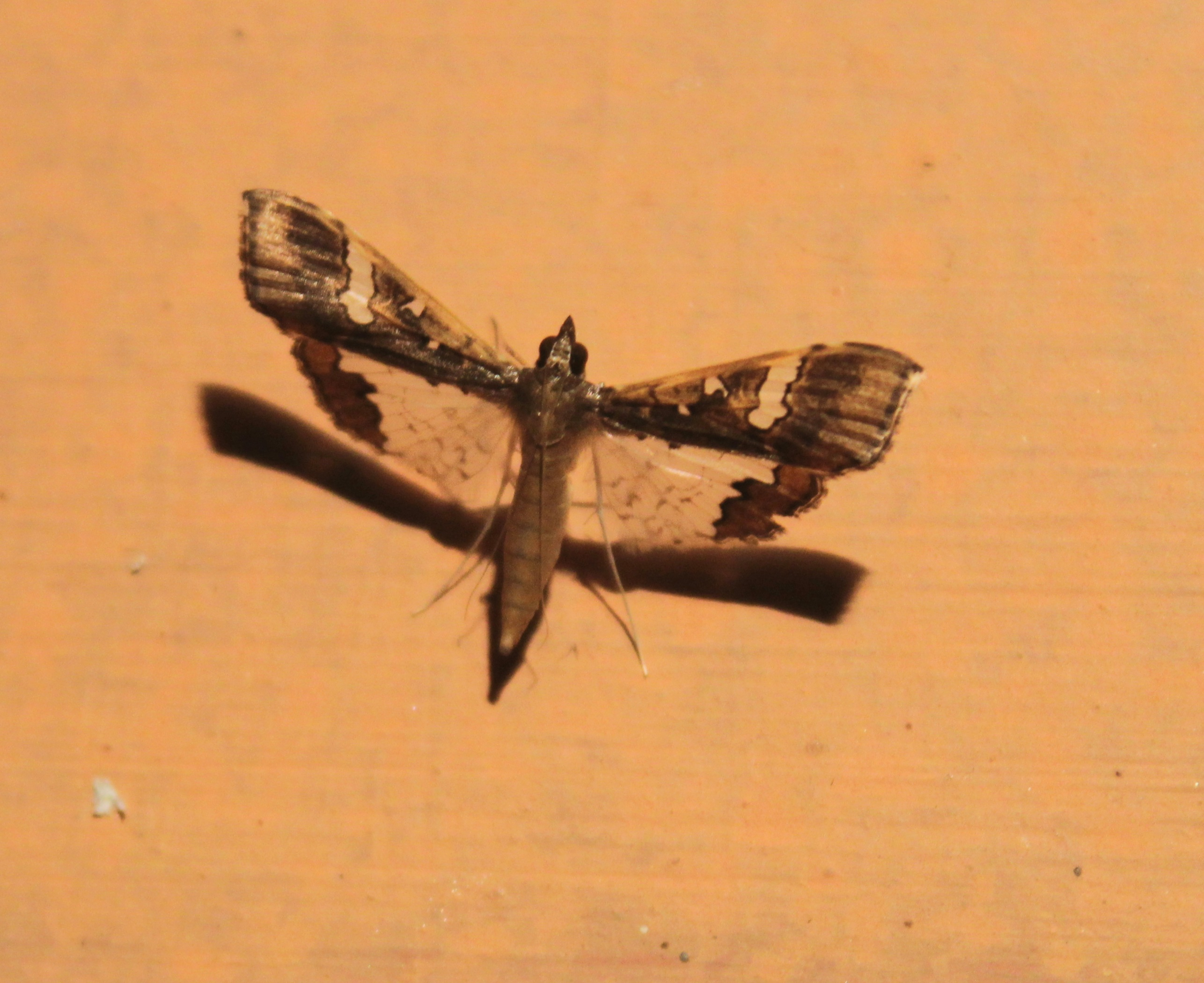

Scientific classification
- Kingdom: Animalia
- Phylum: Arthropoda
- Clade: Pancrustacea
- Class: Insecta
- Order: Lepidoptera
- Family: Crambidae
- Genus: Maruca
- Species: M. vitrata

Binomial name
- Maruca vitrata (Fabricius, 1787)

Synonyms
- Botys bifenestralis Mabille, 1880; Crochiphora testulalis Geyer, 1832; Hydrocampe aquitilis Guérin-Méneville, [1832]; Maruca testulalis (Geyer, 1832); Phalaena vitrata Fabricius, 1787

= Maruca vitrata =

Bean pod borer

Species of moth

Maruca vitrata is a pantropical insect pest of leguminous crops like pigeon pea, cowpea, mung bean and soybean. Its common names include the maruca pod borer, bean pod borer, soybean pod borer, mung moth, and the legume pod borer. The species was first described by Johan Christian Fabricius in 1787.

It can cause losses of 20–80% on the harvests of cowpeas.

Its feeding sites on plants are flower buds, flowers and young pods. In some cases early instars feed on flower peduncles and young stems.

== Methods for control ==
=== Biological ===
Some parasitoids have been shown to serve as a biological control for Maruca vitrata. Parasitoid wasps families include Braconidae and Ichneumonidae; some parasitoid flies in the Tachinidae are also natural enemies of the moth. M. vitrata prefers to lay its eggs on the flowering bodies of the cowpea plant. Efforts have been made to deter M. vitrata from reproducing on the plant ranging from pesticides to a chemical specifically designed to sterilize the moth. Genetically modified cowpeas has been developed to express the cry protein from Bacillus thuringiensis, which is toxic to lepidopteran species, particularly to the pod borer. This technology have benefited farmers by providing greater profitability, higher yields, and reduced pesticide use.

== Distribution ==
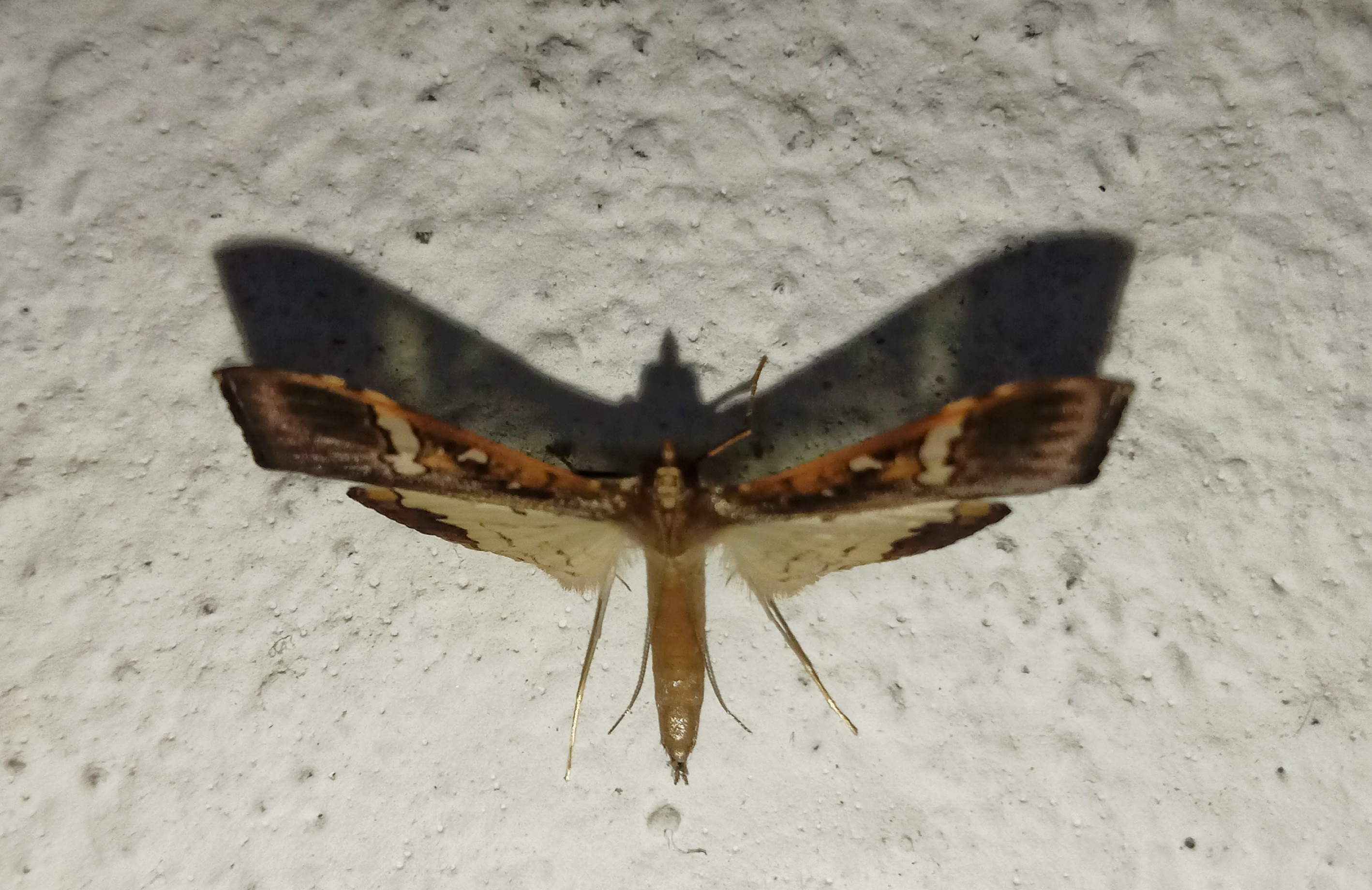
Maruca vitrata photographed at night, in West Bengal, India.

Worldwide in the tropics. Asia, Africa, North, South and Central America, the Caribbean, Europe, Australia & Oceania.
