= Ministry of Food and Agriculture (Ghana) =

Government ministry of Ghana

Coordinates: 5.558940°N 0.205196°W

- Emblem of MOFA

Agency overview
- Formed: Government of Ghana
- Jurisdiction: Government of Ghana
- Headquarters: Accra
- Agency executive: Hon. Eric Opoku (politician), Minister
- Website: Official website

Ghana's Ministry of Food and Agriculture (MOFA) is the government agency responsible for the development and growth of agriculture in the country. The jurisdiction does not cover the cocoa, coffee, or forestry sectors. The primary organisation and main area of the presidential administration of Ghana is the nation's Ministry of Food and Agriculture (MOFA), which is in charge of creating and carrying out policies and plans for the agricultural sector within the framework of an efficient national socio-economic development and prosperity agenda. The Ministry's plans and programmes are created, coordinated, and put into effect using frameworks for policy and strategy using a sector-wide approach. The Food and Agriculture Sector Development Policy II (FASDEP II) and the Medium Term Agriculture Sector Investment Plan (METASIP 2010–2015) were both developed with the aid of MOFA in relation to this.

== Structure of MOFA ==
The ministry is headed by the Minister for Agriculture and his three deputies. The deputies are in charge of the following:

The Minister's Office

- Deputy Minister in charge of Fisheries
- Deputy Minister in charge of Crops
- Deputy Minister in charge of Livestock
- The Line DIrectorates
- The Technical Directorates
- Sub-vented Organizations and State Owned Enterprises
- Councils and Commissions
- The Regional Directorates
- The District Directorates

Position	Name
Ministry of food and Agriculture	Honorable Eric Opoku
Ag. Chief Director	Mr. Paul Siameh

Line Directorates	Director
Human Resource Development and Management Directorates	Madam Esther Nuotuo
Finance and Administrative Directorate	Mr. Gilbert Ampeh
Statistics Research and Information Directorate	Mr. James Ayittey
Policy Planning Monitoring and Evaluation Directorate	Madam Josephine Ivy Quagrainie
Procurement and Supply Chain Directorate	Madam Doris Vaayi Yenawaa

Technical Directorates	Directors
Animal Production Directorates	Mr. Jonas Asare Berchie
Veterinary Service Directorate	Dr. Emmanuel Allegye Coudjoe
Women in Agriculture Development	Madam Paulina Abbey
Plant Protection Regulatory Service Directorate	Dr Eric Quaye
Agriculture Engineering Service Directorates	Ing. Patrick Ohene Kumi Aboagye
Agriculture Extension Services	Prospera Anku
Directorate of Crop Services	Dr. Solomon Gyan Ansah
Financial Controller	Mr. Emmanuel Adusei

Sub Vented Organizations	Heads
Ghana Irrigation Development Authority	Ing Wilson Darkwah
Grains and Legumes Development Board	Dr. Robert. A. Asuboah
Irrigation Company of Upper Region	Alhaji Issah .A. Bukari
National Food Buffer Stock Company	Ing. Wilson Darkwah

== Council ==
- The veterinary council advises the Hon. Minister on issues of veterinary service delivery and organization.
- The chairman of the council is Dr. Kwame O. Jyening

== Heads of Regional Directorates ==
Region	Position	Name
ahafo	Director	Kingsford Nyame
ashanti	Director	Rev. John Mane
bono	Director	Richard Assan Donkor
bono east	Director	Cecilia Kagya- Agyeman
central	Director	Samuel Abraham
eastern	Director	Mr Henry .K. Crenstil Junior
greater accra	Director	Margaret Sumah
northern	Director	Hawah Musah
northern east	Director	Hawah Musah
upper east	Director	Francis Ennor
upper west	Director	Emmanuel Sasu Yeboah
western	Director	S.Y. Apiiga
western north	Director	William .H. Fordjour
volta	Director	Mr. Delali Nutsukpo
oti	Director	Obrien Nyarko
savannah	Director	Mr. Eric Hudson Asamani

== Functions of MOFA ==
The ministry's roles include the following:

- Formulation of appropriate agricultural policies to aid the agricultural sector.
- Planning and coordination of various development projects in the agricultural sector.
- Monitoring and evaluation of the projects and programmes instituted to assess their progress.

== Vision ==
The Ministry's intent is an industrialised agriculture that leads to a systemically altered economy that manifests in increased food security, employment prospects, and lower poverty rates.

== Mission ==
The mission of MOFA is aimed at helping producers, processors, and merchants in their efforts to enhance their standard of living by advancing technological advancements and research, providing efficient extension services, and providing other forms of support.

== Mandate ==
The Ministry of Food and Agriculture (MOFA) leads Ghana's agricultural sector, developing and implementing policies to support national socio-economic growth. MOFA coordinates plans and programs through strategic frameworks, including the Food and Agriculture Sector Development Policy (FASDEP II) and the Medium Term Agriculture Sector Investment Plan (METASIP 2010-15).

== Objectives ==
Agriculture in Ghana is recognised as the mainstay of the economy and has a greater impact on poverty reduction than other sectors. It is also critical for rural development and associated cultural values, social stabilisation, environmental sustainability, and buffering during economic shocks. Based on the role of agriculture in the national development framework, the Food and Agriculture Sector Development Policy (FASDEP II) has the following objectives:

- Food security and emergency preparedness
- Improved growth in incomes
- Increased competitiveness and enhanced integration into domestic and international markets
- Sustainable management of land and environment
- Application of Science and Technology in food and agriculture development
- Improved institutional Coordination

== Strategies ==
By calculating the Medium Term Agricultural Sector Development Plan (METASIP 2010 - 2015), Ghana's farming tactics sum up the government's strategic structure and implementation strategies for achieving self-sufficient growth in all agricultural sub-sectors. This provides a means for maximising agriculture and combining rural growth with structural transformation for the socio-economic development of Ghana.

== The Five Main Subsectors Of the Agriculture Sector ==
Crops: Cereals and Starchy Crops

Livestock Cattle, Sheep, Goats, Poultry, Pigs

Fisheries: Marine, Inland and Aquaculture

Forestry

Cocoa

However, Ghana Cocoa Board under the Ministry of Food and Agriculture is responsible for cocoa affairs in the country.

The Ministry of Lands and Mineral Resources has responsibility for the Forestry Commission, while the Ministry of Fisheries and Aquaculture Development is responsible for the fisheries sub sector.

== Departments and agencies ==
=== DP Membership – Agric Sector working Group ===
- African Development Bank (AfDB)
- Agence française de développement (AFD – France)
- Alliance for Green Revolution for Africa (AGRA)
- Canadian International Development Agency (CIDA)
- Engineers Without Borders (EWB)
- The Brazilian Agricultural Research Corporation (EMBRAPA)
- Food and Agricultural Organization of the UN (FAO)
- German Development Cooperation (GIZ-KfW)
- International Food Policy Research Institute (IFPRI)
- International Fund for Agricultural Development (IFAD)
- International Water Management Institute (IWMI)
- Japan International Corporation Agency (JICA)
- Japan International Research Centre for Agricultural Science (JIRCAS)
- Millennium Challenge Corporation (MCC)
- United States Agency for International Development (USAID)
- World Bank (WB)
- World Food Programme (WFP)

== Projects Of The Ministry Of Food And Agriculture ==
- PFJ (Planting For Foods And Jobs): This is a five-year contract that is made to increase the production of crops in Ghana and decrease the importation of food. This project is also meant to provide job opportunities for the youth of the country. A training workshop was organized in collaboration with the Peasant Farmers Association of Ghana in 2021 for the PFJ implementation guidelines for farmers.
- The Ghana Peri-urban Vegetables Value Chain Project (GPVVCP) operates as a subsidiary initiative under the Ghana Commercial Agriculture Project (GCAP). It is financially supported by a $2.85 million grant from the Japan Social Development Fund (JSDF) through a Trust Fund Arrangement with the World Bank. The Ministry of Food and Agriculture (MOFA), specifically its Directorate of Crop Services (DCS), is responsible for project implementation, with managerial and coordination assistance from GCAP and technical guidance on irrigation from the Ghana Irrigation Development Authority (GIDA). Project Objective: The project aligns closely with the Government of Ghana's strategy to alleviate poverty by enhancing food security through increased vegetable production and market access for both domestic consumption and exports. It is also in harmony with JSDF's aim to empower and uplift the lives of the most underprivileged and vulnerable segments of society. Furthermore, it is rooted in the World Bank Group Country Partnership Strategy, which supports Ghana's Shared Growth and Development Agenda (GSGDA) and the Government's Agenda for Prosperity. The central objective of the project is to enhance the productivity and market access for vegetable farmers residing in selected peri-urban communities in Ghana. To achieve this, the project will:
  1. Promote water harvesting and small-scale irrigation schemes to enable year-round vegetable production and consumption.
  2. Enhance the capacity of resource-poor farmers and provide support to elevate their productivity and produce quality.
  3. Decrease post-harvest losses through the establishment of efficient post-harvest handling practices.
  4. Facilitate access to high-value markets to ensure improved income levels for the farmers. In essence, the GPVVCP seeks to boost the livelihoods of peri-urban vegetable farmers in Ghana by enhancing their productivity, product quality, and market accessibility while reducing post-harvest losses.
- The Savannah Zone Agricultural Productivity Improvement Project, with a total cost of US$56.32 Million, was launched in May 2018 to support the Ghanaian government's efforts within the framework of the Ghana Shared Growth and Development Agenda (GSODA-II 2014–2017). The project is aligned with the Planting for Food and Jobs (PFJ) Campaign and aims to stimulate innovation in agricultural production by enhancing skills and technological capabilities. This initiative aims to uplift farmers from low-productivity agriculture to more productive activities, thereby creating jobs, reducing poverty, increasing incomes, and improving social equity. The project has a duration of five years, spanning from 2018 to 2022. By the end of this period, it intends to directly benefit 50,000 individuals and reach 250,000 farmers across the country through the PFJ's input subsidy program. Importantly, at least 50% of the beneficiaries will be women and youth. Project Objectives: The overarching development objective of the project is to transform agricultural value chains in the Savannah Zone, with specific objectives that include:
  1. Increasing food and nutrition security among farmers.
  2. Raising incomes by enhancing agricultural productivity and diversification.
  3. Facilitating the establishment and strengthening of agribusinesses to sustainably increase incomes for participants along selected value chains.
- The Ghana Commercial Agriculture Project (GCAP) is a government initiative implemented under the Ministry of Food and Agriculture (MOFA) in Ghana. The primary objective of this project is to enhance agricultural productivity and production on both smallholder and nucleus farms in specific project intervention areas within Ghana. GCAP received approval from the Board of Executive Directors of the World Bank on March 22, 2012, and was subsequently endorsed by Ghana's Parliament on August 16, 2012. The project officially commenced on April 8, 2013. GCAP is characterized by its focus on the private sector and its responsiveness to market demands. It was initially financed by a World Bank loan of US$100 million and a grant of US$16.95 million from the United States Agency for International Development (USAID). Project Restructuring: In November 2015, the project underwent restructuring, which included the reformation and strengthening of the Ghana Irrigation Development Authority (GIDA) and the Irrigation Company of Upper Region (ICOUR). Additionally, four major irrigation schemes and six smaller-scale schemes were rehabilitated and modernized. The project's closing date was extended from September 2017 to September 2019. Subsequently, in May 2018, the project underwent a second restructuring, acquiring an additional financing of US$50 million and an extension of the closing date to December 2020. Project Objectives: The core development objective of GCAP is to enhance agricultural productivity in designated project intervention areas by improving access to reliable water, land, finance, and agricultural input and output markets for both smallholder and nucleus farms.
- The Outgrower and Value Chain Fund (OVCF) was established in 2011 and is currently in its second phase of implementation, supported by a €33.0 million loan from the Government of Germany through KfW. Project Objective: OVCF's primary objective is to address the financing gap in agriculture. It achieves this by providing medium to long-term loans to selected commercially viable value chains. These loans are disbursed through tripartite contractual agreements involving:
  1. Outgrower associations: These are groups of farmers who cultivate crops or produce goods under the guidance and support of the Technical Operator.
  2. Technical Operator: A dedicated company that provides inputs, services, and technical guidance to the outgrowers, as well as purchasing their produce.
  3. Participating bank (Financial Operator): The financial institution responsible for facilitating the loan disbursement and repayment process. Through these contractual arrangements, OVCF aims to strengthen agricultural value chains, promote commercial viability, and ensure sustainable financial support for agricultural projects.
- Rice Sector Support Project: This project is a collaborative effort between the Ministry of Food and Agriculture (MOFA) and the Agence Française de Développement (AFD) of France. The project's main focus is to support lowland rice production in areas spanning approximately 6,000 hectares. These areas are located in the Northern, Upper East, Upper West Regions, and the northern parts of the Volta Region of Ghana. Upon completion, the project aims to contribute an additional 16,250 metric tons of milled rice annually to the existing production. Project Objective: The project aligns with MOFA's strategy to enhance the production of food crops, achieve food self-sufficiency, and establish efficient output processing and marketing systems. In particular, it focuses on rice production, which has been identified as a key food crop in the Food and Agricultural Sector Development Policy (FASDEP) that requires special attention to achieve self-sufficiency. The overarching goal of the project is to enhance the livelihoods of impoverished farmers in the targeted regions. This is to be achieved by establishing a sustainable economic activity built upon the region's natural potential, thereby creating a platform for improved income and living standards among the local population.

== National Best Farmer Awards ==
=== 2023 ===
Charity Akortia, a 57-year old woman from the Agona West Municipality in the Central Region was awarded GH¢1 million as the national best farmer for 2023. The cash prize was sponsored by Agriculture Development Bank.

Theophilus Ezenrane Ackah from the Western Region was awarded a high horsepower tractor, a boom sprayer, a set of implements, and trailer as the first runner up. Ghana Exim Bank sponsored this prize.

Kwaku Yeboah Asumah from the Bono East Region received the second runner up award. His prize was an MF tractor head, trailer, and set of implements. His prize was sponsored by Stanbic Bank.

=== 2022 ===
In 2022, Nana Yaw Sarpong Siriboe won the ultimate award for being the best farmer in the country. Bryan Acheampong, the Minister for Food and Agriculture, awarded Nana Yaw Sarpong Siriboe of Siriboe Farms the esteemed Ultimate Award Prize as the National Best Farmer of 2022.

=== 2021 ===
The winner was Alhaji Mohammed Mashud. Alhaji Mohammed Mashud, a resident of the Northern region, has achieved the prestigious title of National Best Farmer for the year 2021 at the age of 44 and with an esteemed Ultimate Award Prize.

=== 2020 ===
The 2020 National best farmer went to a fifty-five year old livestock and multi crop farmer from the Jomoro District in the Western Region, Mr. Solomon Kojo Kusi. He was handed a cheque of GHC 570,000 at the 36 National Farmers Day Celebration in Techiman in the Bono East Region.

== See also ==
- Agriculture in Ghana
- Ministry of Fisheries and Aquaculture Development
