= Mavis =

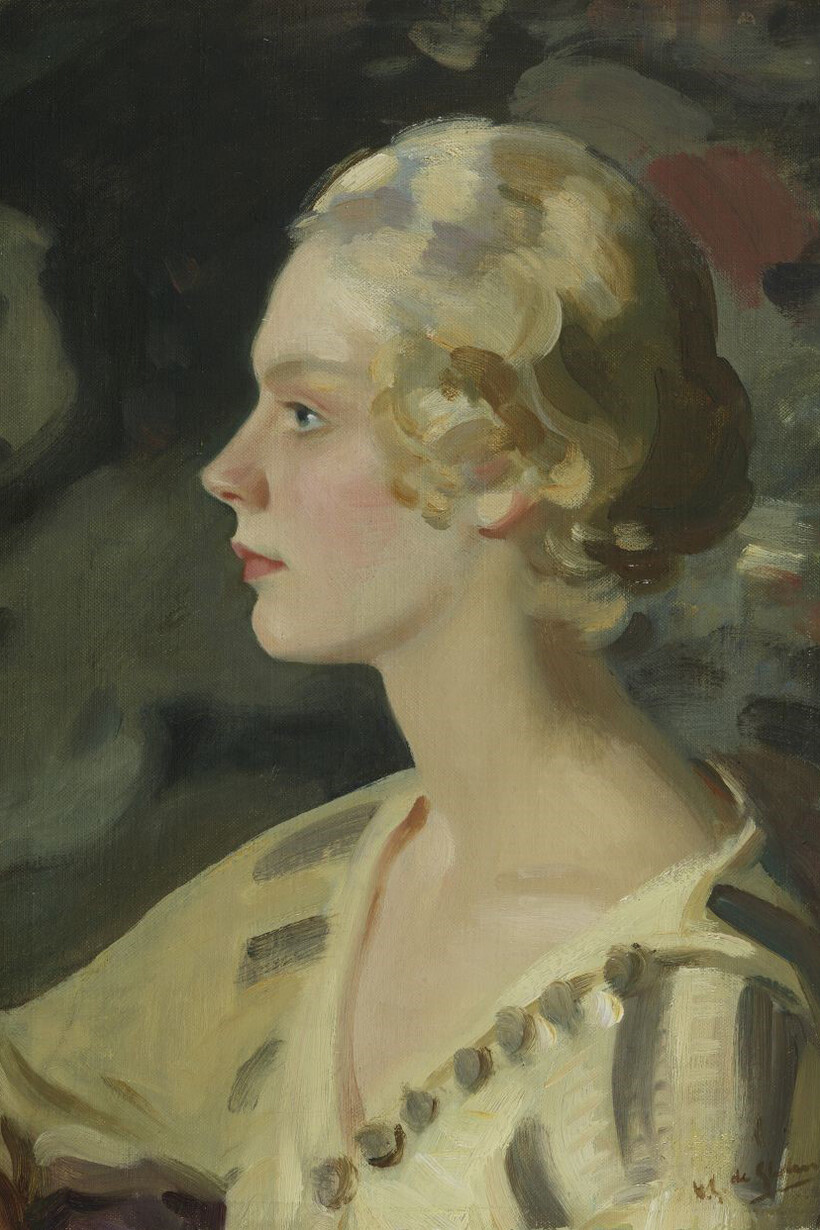
- Mavis Yorke by Wilfrid de Glehn, 1920.
- Gender: Female
- Language: Old French via Breton

Origin
- Meaning: song thrush

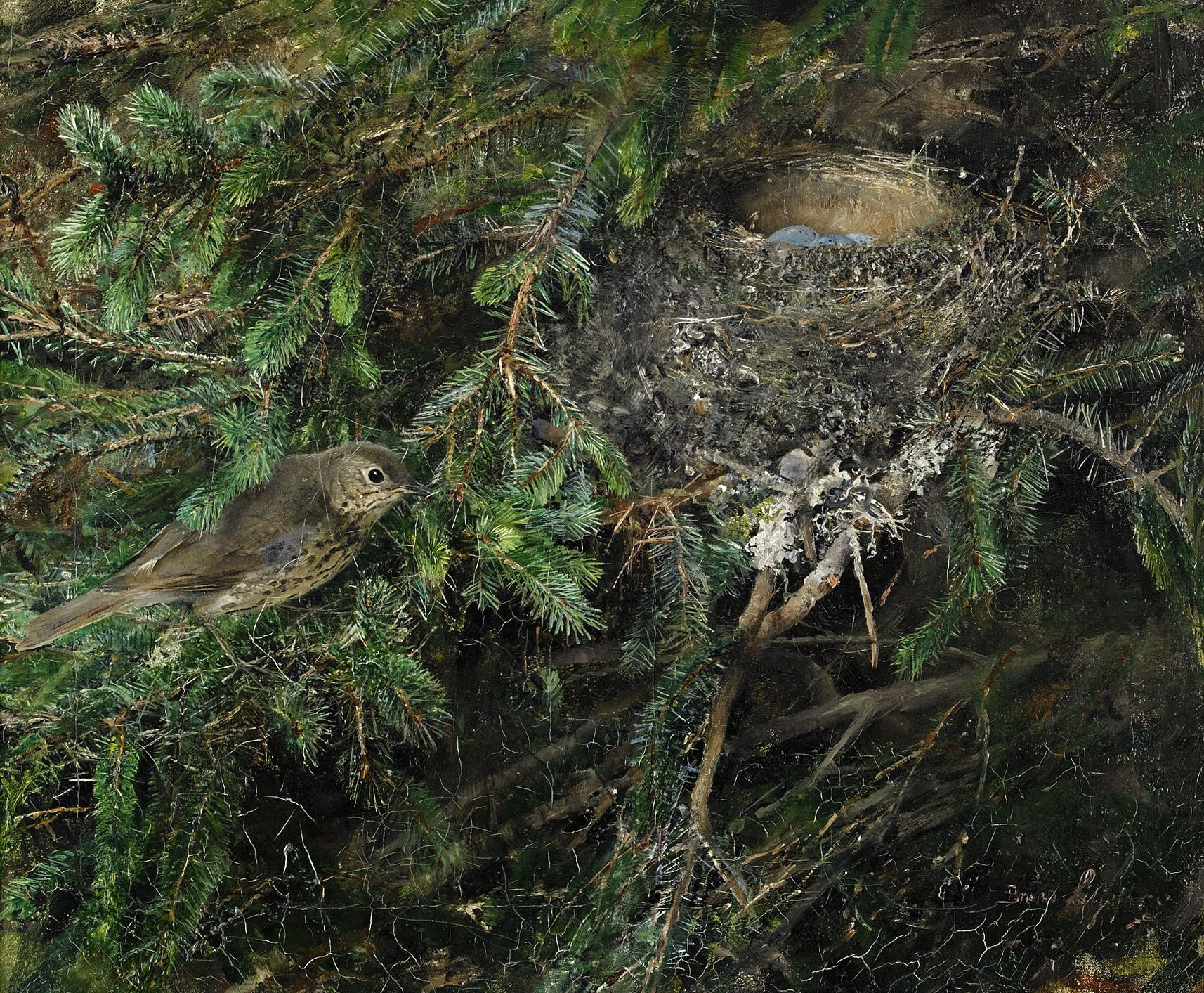
Song thrush at nest by Bruno Liljefors, 1888.

Mavis is a feminine given name, derived from a name for the common Old World song thrush. Its first modern usage was in Marie Corelli's 1895 novel The Sorrows of Satan, which featured a character named Mavis Clare (whose name was said to be "rather odd but suitable", as "she sings quite as sweetly as any thrush"). The name was long obsolete by the 19th century, but known from its poetic use, as in Robert Burns's 1794 poem Ca' the Yowes ("Hark the mavis evening sang/Sounding Clouden's woods amang"); and in the popular love song "Mary of Argyle" (c.1850), where lyricist Charles Jefferys wrote, "I have heard the mavis singing its love-song to the morn."

Mavis was among the top 100 names for newborn girls in New Zealand between 1900 and 1943 and among the top 100 names for newborn girls in the United Kingdom between 1924 and 1944. It first appeared among the 1,000 most popular names for newborn girls in the United States in 1895. It was at peak use for American girls between 1920 and 1938, when it was among the top 300 names given to newborn girls. Its usage declined thereafter in the Anglosphere, but usage in the United States has since increased in recent years. Mavis has again been among the top 1,000 names for newborn girls in the United States since 2016. Mavis Dracula is Dracula's teenage daughter in the popular Hotel Transylvania franchise, which debuted in 2012 and has had sequels in 2015, 2018, and 2022.

== Notable people ==
- Mavis Adjei, Ghanaian actress
- Mavis Akoto, Ghanaian sprinter
- Mavis Batey, MBE (1921–2013), English code-breaker during World War II
- Mavis Biesanz (1919–2008), Finnish-American writer and sociologist
- Mavis B. Carroll (1917–2009), American statistician
- Mavis Cheek (1948–2023), English novelist and feminist
- Mavis Chirandu (b. 1995), Zimbabwean footballer
- Mavis Thorpe Clark, AM (1909–1999), Australian novelist and children's writer
- Mavis Danso (b. 1984), Ghanaian footballer
- Mavis Doering (1929–2007), Cherokee Nation basketmaker from Oklahoma
- Mavis Dgajmah (b. 1973), Ghanaian footballer
- Mavis Ehlert (1922–2007), British-Canadian sculptor
- Mavis Fan (b. 1977), Taiwanese singer
- Mavis Freeman (1918–1988), American swimmer who competed in the 1936 Summer Olympics
- Mavis Gallant (1922–2014), Canadian writer
- Mavis Gibson, Zimbabwean lawyer, first black woman judge of the High Court of Zimbabwe, and first woman judge of the High Court of Namibia
- Mavis Gray née Beckett (b. 1944), Australian field hockey player
- Mavis Doriel Hay (1894–1979), British author
- Mavis Hee (b. 1974), Singaporean singer
- Mavis Hinds (1929–2009), English meteorologist
- Mavis Hutchinson (1924–2022), first woman to run across the United States
- Mavis Jones (1922–1990), Australian cricket player
- Mavis Jukes (b. 1947), American children's author
- Mavis Kelsey (1912–2013), American internist and one of the founders of the Kelsey-Seybold Clinic
- Mavis Hawa Koomson (b. 1966), Ghanaian politician and educationist
- Mavis Le Marquand, Jersey lawn bowler
- Mavis Leno (b. 1946), American feminist and wife of Jay Leno
- Mavis Maclean, MBE, FRSA (b. 1943), socio-legal researcher at the University of Oxford and founder of the Oxford Centre for Family Law and Policy (OXFLAP)
- Mavis Meadowcroft (1926–2008), Australian lawn bowler
- Mavis Moyo (b. 1929), Radio Zimbabwe broadcaster and founding member of the Federation of African Media Women Zimbabwe (FAMWZ)
- Mavis Mullins, New Zealand businesswoman
- Mavis Nicholson (1930–2022), Welsh broadcaster
- Mavis Ogun (b. 1973), Nigerian footballer who played in three FIFA Women's World Cups
- Mavis Pugh (1914–2006), English actress and comedian
- Mavis Rivers (1929–1992), Samoan and New Zealand jazz singer
- Mavis Smitheman, local body councillor for Ardwick, Manchester
- Mavis Staines (b. 1954), Canadian ballet dancer
- Mavis Staples (b. 1939), American rhythm and blues singer
- Mavis Steele MBE (1928–1998), British lawn bowler
- Mavis Sweeney (1909–1986), Australian hospital pharmacist who was awarded The Evans Medal for Merit in 1968
- Mavis Taillieu (b. 1952), Canadian politician
- Mavis Tate (1893–1947), British Conservative Party politician and feminist, born Maybird Hogg
- Mavis Taylor (1915–2007), Australian humanitarian
- Mavis Tchibota (b. 1996), Congolese footballer
- Mavis Villiers (1911–1976), British actress
- Mavis Wilson (fl. 1980–90s), Canadian politician

== Fictional characters ==
- Mavis Anderson, secondary character and best friend to Miss Ellie Ewing (Barbara Bel Geddes) in Dallas
- Mavis Beacon, the eponymous African-American typing instructor of the Mavis Beacon Teaches Typing software
- Mavis Freestone, a singer in the ...in Death series of detective novels
- Mavis Madling, in the situation comedy series Designing Women
- Mavis Pike, in the British situation comedy Dad's Army
- Mavis Wilton, in the British soap opera Coronation Street
- Mavis, a diesel locomotive character from The Railway Series books by the Rev. W. Awdry and from the derived children's television series Thomas & Friends

== Other uses ==
- Kawanishi H6K, Japanese WWII flying boat, codenamed "Mavis"
