= Ehlert =

Ehlert is a German surname. Notable people with the surname include:

- Herta Ehlert (1905–1997), female guard at many Nazi concentration camps during the Holocaust
- Lois Ehlert (1934–2021), American author and illustrator of children's books
- Louis Ehlert (1825–1884), German composer and music critic
- Mavis Ehlert (1922–2007), British–Canadian sculptor
- Tamara Ehlert (1921–2008), German writer and lyricist
- Tracy Ehlert, American politician

== See also ==
- Michael Ehlert Falch (born 1956), Danish singer, guitarist, author and actor
