= Mavis (disambiguation) =

Mavis is a feminine given name.

Mavis may also refer to:

== Places ==
- Mavis (crater), a small lunar crater
- 1607 Mavis, an asteroid, discovered in 1950

== Surname ==
- Andrew Mavis (born 1976), Canadian basketball player who competed in the 2000 Olympics
- Eylem Elif Maviş (born 1973), first Turkish woman mountaineer to climb Mount Everest

== Other uses ==
- "Mavis", Allied codename for the World War II Japanese Kawanishi H6K flying boat
- Mavis, the Old English name for the song thrush (Turdus philomelos), still used by some dialects in the UK
- The Mavis's, an Australian alternative rock band
- Cyclone Mavis (1965), west of Australia - see List of historical tropical cyclone names
- Cyclone Mavis (1971)
- Mavis Mill, a Lancashire cotton spinning mill
- Empire Mavis, a British ship - see List of Empire ships (M)
