= Jay Leno =

American television host and comedian (born 1950)

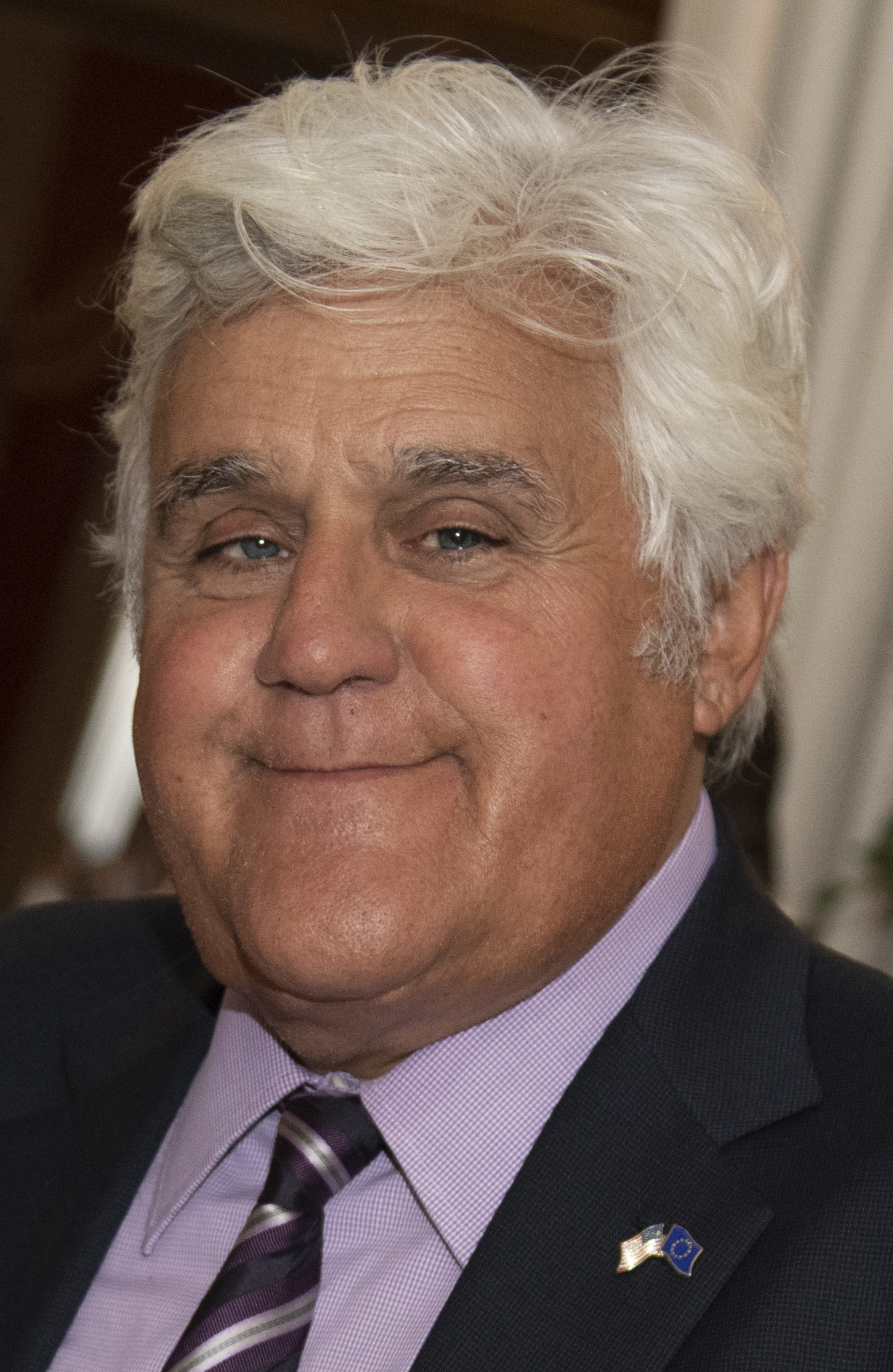
- Leno in 2019
- Born: James Douglas Muir Leno; April 28, 1950 (age 76); New Rochelle, New York, U.S.
- Education: Emerson College (BA)
- Notable work: The Tonight Show with Jay Leno; (host, 1992–2009, 2010–2014); The Jay Leno Show; (host, 2009–2010); Jay Leno's Garage (host, 2014–2022); You Bet Your Life; (host, 2021–2023)
- Spouse: Mavis Nicholson (m. 1980)

Comedy career
- Years active: 1976–present
- Medium: Stand-up, television, film
- Genres: Observational comedy, black comedy, surreal humor, insult comedy, deadpan, satire
- Subjects: American culture, American politics, everyday life, pop culture, current events, human behavior

James Douglas Muir Leno (/ˈlɛnoʊ/ LEN-oh; born April 28, 1950) is an American television host, comedian, writer and actor. After doing stand-up comedy for years, Leno was chosen in 1992 to replace Johnny Carson as the host of NBC's The Tonight Show; Leno hosted The Tonight Show until September 2009 when Conan O'Brien took over as host and Leno started a prime time talk show, The Jay Leno Show, which aired weeknights at 10:00 p.m. ET, also on NBC. O'Brien turned down NBC's offer to have Leno host a half hour monologue show before The Tonight Show to boost ratings amid reported viewership diminishing, which sparked the 2010 Tonight Show conflict that resulted in Leno's returning to hosting the show on March 1, 2010. He hosted his last episode of his second tenure on February 6, 2014. That year, he was inducted into the Television Hall of Fame. From 2014 to 2022, he hosted Jay Leno's Garage, and from 2021 to 2023, hosted the revival of You Bet Your Life.

Leno writes a regular column in Popular Mechanics showcasing his car collection and giving automotive advice. He also writes occasional "Motormouth" articles for The Sunday Times.

== Early life ==
Leno was born April 28, 1950, in New Rochelle, New York. His homemaker mother, Catherine (née Muir; 1911–1993), was born in Greenock, Scotland, and came to the United States at age 11. His father, Angelo (1910–1994), was an insurance salesman born in New York to immigrants from Flumeri, Campania, Italy. Leno grew up in Andover, Massachusetts, and graduated from Andover High School. He obtained a bachelor's degree in speech therapy from Emerson College in Boston, where he started a comedy club in 1973. His older brother, Patrick (May 12, 1940 – October 6, 2002), was a Vietnam War veteran who became an attorney.

== Career ==
=== Early career ===
Leno made his first appearance on The Tonight Show on March 2, 1977, performing a comedy routine. During the 1970s, he had minor roles in several television series and films, first in the 1976 episode "J.J. in Trouble" of Good Times, and the same year in the pilot of Holmes & Yo-Yo. After an uncredited appearance in the 1977 film Fun with Dick and Jane, he played more prominent roles in 1978 in American Hot Wax and Silver Bears. His other appearances from that period include guest spots on the television shows One Day at a Time, Alice and Laverne & Shirley. He had minor roles in the films Americathon (1979), and Polyester (1981). His only starring film role was the 1989 direct-to-video Collision Course, with Pat Morita. He also appeared numerous times on Late Night with David Letterman.

He also appeared on three weeks of the short-lived NBC game show Match Game-Hollywood Squares Hour in 1983 and 1984.

=== The Tonight Show ===
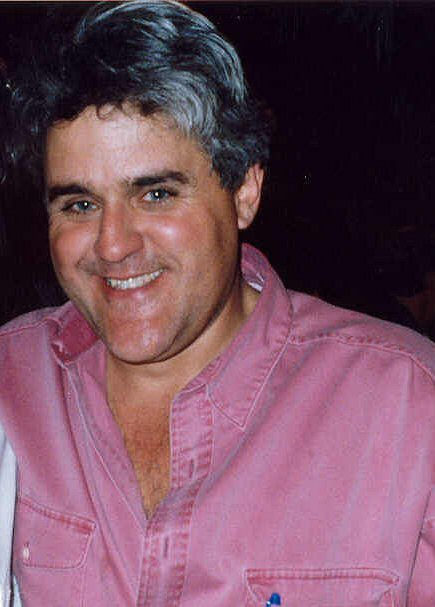
Leno in 1993, in the year after becoming host of The Tonight Show

Starting in 1986, Leno was a regular substitute host for Johnny Carson on The Tonight Show. In 1992, he replaced Carson as host amid controversy with David Letterman, who had been hosting Late Night with David Letterman since 1982 (which aired after The Tonight Show), and whom many—including Carson himself—expected to be Carson's successor. The story of this turbulent transition became the basis of a book and a movie. Leno continued to perform as a stand-up comedian throughout his Tonight Show tenure. In 1988, he received a contract extension with NBC itself. The July 1995 episode of The Tonight Show which featured an interview with Hugh Grant (who had been arrested for receiving oral sex in a public place from a prostitute) saw Leno rate higher than Letterman for the first time.

In 2004, Leno signed a contract extension with NBC to retain him as host of The Tonight Show until 2009. Later in 2004, Conan O'Brien signed a contract with NBC to become the show's host in 2009, replacing Leno at that time.

During the 2007–08 Writers Guild of America strike, Leno was accused of violating WGA guidelines by writing his own monologue for The Tonight Show. NBC and Leno claimed there were private meetings with the WGA where a secret agreement was reached allowing this; the WGA denied such meetings. Leno answered questions in front of the Writers Guild of America, West trial committee in February 2009 and June 2009, and when the WGAW published its list of strikebreakers on August 11, 2009, Leno was not on it.

On April 23, 2009, Leno checked himself in to a hospital with an undisclosed illness. He was released the following day and returned to work on Monday, April 27. The two subsequently canceled Tonight Show episodes for April 23 and 24 were his first in 17 years as host. The illness was not initially disclosed, but Leno later told People magazine that it was for exhaustion.

==== Michael Jackson trial ====
During the 2005 trial of Michael Jackson over allegations of child molestation, Leno was one of a few celebrities who appeared as defense witnesses. In his testimony regarding a phone conversation with the accuser, Leno testified that he was not asked for any money and there did not appear to be any coaching — but the calls seemed unusual and scripted.

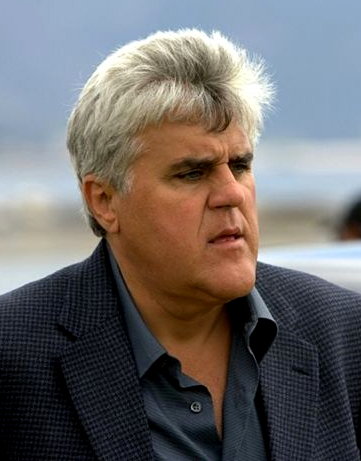
Leno in 2006

As a result, Leno was initially not allowed to tell jokes about Jackson or the case, which had been a fixture of The Tonight Show's opening monologue in particular. But he and his show's writers used a legal loophole by having Leno briefly step aside while stand-in comedians took the stage and told jokes about the trial. These stand-ins included Roseanne Barr, Drew Carey, Brad Garrett, and Dennis Miller. The gag order was challenged, and the court ruled on March 10, 2005 that Leno could continue telling jokes about the trial as long as he did not discuss his testimony. Leno celebrated by devoting an entire monologue to Michael Jackson jokes.

=== Succession by Conan O'Brien; The Jay Leno Show ===
Because Leno's show continued to lead all late-night programming in the Nielsen ratings, the pending expiration of his contract led to speculation about whether he would become a late-night host for another network when his commitment to NBC expired. He left The Tonight Show on Friday, May 29, 2009, and Conan O'Brien took over on June 1, 2009.

On December 8, 2008, it was reported that Leno would remain on NBC and move to a new hour-long show at 10 p.m. Eastern Time (9 p.m. Central Time) five nights a week. It would follow a similar format to The Tonight Show, be recorded in the same studio, and retain many of Leno's most popular segments, while O'Brien continued to host The Tonight Show.

Leno's new show, The Jay Leno Show, debuted on September 14, 2009. It was announced at the Television Critics Association summer press tour that it would feature one or two celebrities, occasional musical guests, and keep the popular "Headlines" segments, which would be near the end of the show. First guests included Jerry Seinfeld, Oprah Winfrey (via satellite), and a short sit-down with Kanye West discussing his controversy at the 2009 MTV Video Music Awards, which had occurred the night before.

=== Timeslot conflict and return to The Tonight Show ===
In their new roles, neither O'Brien nor Leno succeeded in delivering the viewing audiences the network anticipated. On January 7, 2010, multiple media outlets reported that beginning March 1, 2010, Leno would move from his 10 p.m. weeknight time slot to 11:35 p.m., due to a combination of pressure from local affiliates, whose newscasts were suffering, and both Leno's and O'Brien's poor ratings. Leno's show would be shortened from an hour to 30 minutes. All NBC late night programming would also be preempted by the 2010 Winter Olympics between February 15 and 26, moving The Tonight Show to 12:05 a.m., the first post-midnight timeslot in its history. O'Brien's contract stipulated that NBC could move the show ahead to 12:05 a.m. without penalty (a clause included primarily to accommodate sports preemptions).

On January 10, NBC confirmed that it would move Leno out of primetime as of February 12 and move him to late-night as soon as possible. TMZ reported that O'Brien was given no advance notice of this change, and that NBC offered him two choices: an hour-long 12:05 a.m. time slot, or the option to leave the network. On January 12, O'Brien issued a press release that he would not continue with Tonight if it moved to a 12:05 a.m. time slot, saying, "I believe that delaying The Tonight Show into the next day to accommodate another comedy program will seriously damage what I consider to be the greatest franchise in the history of broadcasting. The Tonight Show at 12:05 simply isn't The Tonight Show."

On January 21, it was announced that NBC had struck a deal with O'Brien: He would leave The Tonight Show, receive a $33-million payout, and his staff of almost 200 would receive $12 million in the departure. His final episode aired on Friday, January 22, 2010. Leno returned as host of The Tonight Show following the 2010 Winter Olympics on March 1, 2010.

On July 1, 2010, Variety reported that total viewership for Leno's Tonight Show had dropped from 5 million to 4 million for the second quarter of 2010, compared to the same period in 2009. Although it represented the show's lowest second-quarter ratings since 1992, Tonight was still the most-watched late-night program, ahead of ABC's Nightline (3.7 million) and Late Show with David Letterman (3.3 million).

=== Announcement of successor ===
On April 3, 2013, NBC announced that Leno would leave The Tonight Show in spring 2014, with Jimmy Fallon as his designated successor.

Leno's final show as the host of The Tonight Show was on February 6, 2014, with guests Billy Crystal (who was the first guest on the first version of Leno's show), musical guest Garth Brooks, and surprise guests Jack Black, Kim Kardashian, Jim Parsons, Sheryl Crow, Chris Paul, Carol Burnett and Oprah Winfrey.

=== After The Tonight Show ===
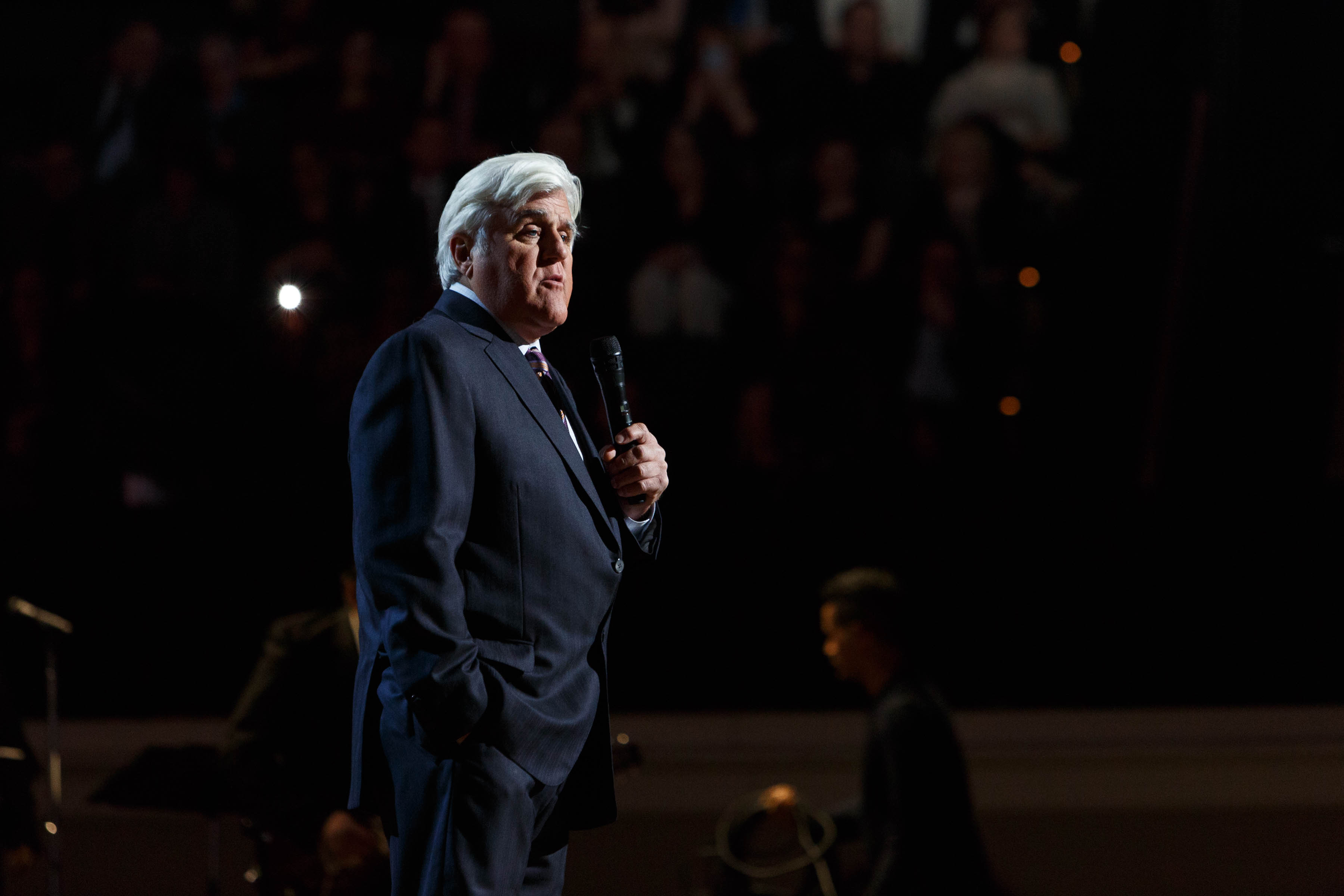
Leno speaking in 2020

Leno has maintained an active schedule as a touring stand-up comedian, doing an average of 200 live performances a year in venues across the United States and Canada and at charity events and USO tours. He has also appeared on the Tonight Show with Jimmy Fallon and Late Night with Seth Meyers, and was a guest on the finale of The Late Late Show with Craig Ferguson. He appeared in a cameo role drilling and tormenting James Corden in a facetious boot camp for talk-show hosts on the premiere of The Late Late Show with James Corden. He declined an invitation to appear on Late Show with David Letterman despite speculation he would appear on the show's finale in 2015, although he had appeared with Letterman along with Winfrey in a Late Show commercial airing during Super Bowl XLIV in 2010.

Leno hosted a one-hour Jay Leno's Garage special on CNBC in 2014, and the show returned as a primetime series on the cable channel from 2015 until 2022. The series was canceled in January 2023 after seven seasons due to a decision by the channel to re-emphasize business-oriented programming.

Leno also had a recurring role in the Tim Allen comedy series Last Man Standing since season 5, playing a mechanic, Joe Leonard, in a store operated by Allen's character, Mike Baxter.

Leno hosted the third revival of the game show You Bet Your Life for two seasons, from 2021 until 2023. The show was renewed for a third season but was cancelled in August 2023 after Leno refused to cross the picket line during the 2023 Writers Guild of America strike, after Fox First Run offered stations two other syndicated game shows to fill You Bet Your Life's timeslot during the strike, instead of reruns.

Leno also does voice acting, such as The Crimson Chin on The Fairly OddParents from 2001 to 2016 and Billy Beagle of Mickey and the Roadster Racers.

In 2019, Leno was a guest judge on season 14 of America's Got Talent where he pressed the Golden Buzzer for opera singer Emanne Beasha.

In 2023, Leno returned to NBC to appear as a celebrity guest judge on the two-episode season finale of Hot Wheels: Ultimate Challenge.

In November 2026, Leno declined an invitation to participate in NBC's 100th anniversary television special, citing a previously scheduled stand-up comedy engagement. The special was set to feature David Letterman and Conan O'Brien in a tribute to Johnny Carson, as well as all other current and living former hosts of its Tonight Show and Late Night franchises.

== Public image ==
=== Criticism ===
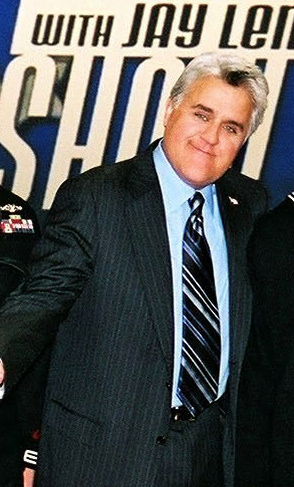
Leno on set of The Tonight Show in 2005

Leno discussing the feud with David Letterman in 2023

Leno has faced criticism for his perceived role in the 2010 Tonight Show conflict. Critics have cited a 2004 Tonight Show clip where Leno said he would allow O'Brien to take over without incident. At the time, Leno said he did not want O'Brien to leave for a competing network, adding, "I'll be 59 when [the switch occurs]. That's five years from now. There's really only one person who could have done this into his 60s, and that was Johnny Carson; I think it's fair to say I'm no Johnny Carson." Leno also described The Tonight Show as a dynasty, saying, "You hold it and hand it off to the next person. And I don't want to see all the fighting." At the end of the segment, he said, "Conan, it's yours! See you in five years, buddy!"

Jimmy Kimmel discussed his appearance on Leno's show during an interview with Marc Maron for the latter's podcast in 2012. Kimmel stated that he felt O'Brien was not given a proper chance, but that he was also motivated by his own history with Leno. According to Kimmel, Leno had some years prior been in serious discussions with ABC about the possibility of jumping ship from NBC. During this period, Leno initiated a friendship with Kimmel, wanting to ensure that they would be on good terms if the move was made (under that scenario, Leno would have taken Kimmel's time slot and become his lead-in). However, after Leno made the arrangement to remain at NBC, "those conversations were gone", according to Kimmel. Realizing that Leno's relationship with him had been artificial, Kimmel felt "worked over", reasoning that Leno was using the ABC discussions as a bargaining tactic to try to get his old job back.

Leno has also been criticized for the perceived change in the content of his monologues from his previous stand-up material. Actor and comedian Patton Oswalt was among the celebrities who openly voiced disappointment with Leno, saying, "Comedians who don't like Jay Leno now, and I'm one of them, we're not like, 'Jay Leno sucks'; it's that we're so hurt and disappointed that one of the best comedians of our generation ... willfully has shut the switch off."

In August 2020, Leno faced criticism in the media for expressing support for Ellen DeGeneres despite a workplace investigation into toxic behavior and sexual misconduct and harassment claims against producers of The Ellen DeGeneres Show.

=== Support for Leno ===
NBC Sports chairman and former Saturday Night Live producer Dick Ebersol spoke out against all who had criticized Leno, calling them "chicken-hearted and gutless". Jeff Gaspin, then chairman of NBC Universal Television Entertainment, also defended Leno, saying, "This has definitely crossed the line. Jay Leno is the consummate professional and one of the hardest-working people in television. It's a shame that he's being pulled into this." Fellow comedians Paul Reiser, Jerry Seinfeld and Jim Norton (a frequent contributor to The Tonight Show) also voiced support for Leno.

Responding to the mounting criticism, Leno said NBC had assured him that O'Brien was willing to accept the proposed arrangement and that they would not let either host out of his contract. He also said that the situation was "all business", and that all of the decisions were made by NBC. He appeared on the January 28, 2010 episode of The Oprah Winfrey Show in an attempt to repair some of the damage done to his public image.

== Influences ==
Leno's comedic influences include Johnny Carson, Robert Klein, Alan King, David Brenner, Mort Sahl, George Carlin, Don Rickles, Bob Newhart, and Rodney Dangerfield.

Dennis Miller and Jerry Seinfeld have credited Leno as their inspiration.

== Personal life ==
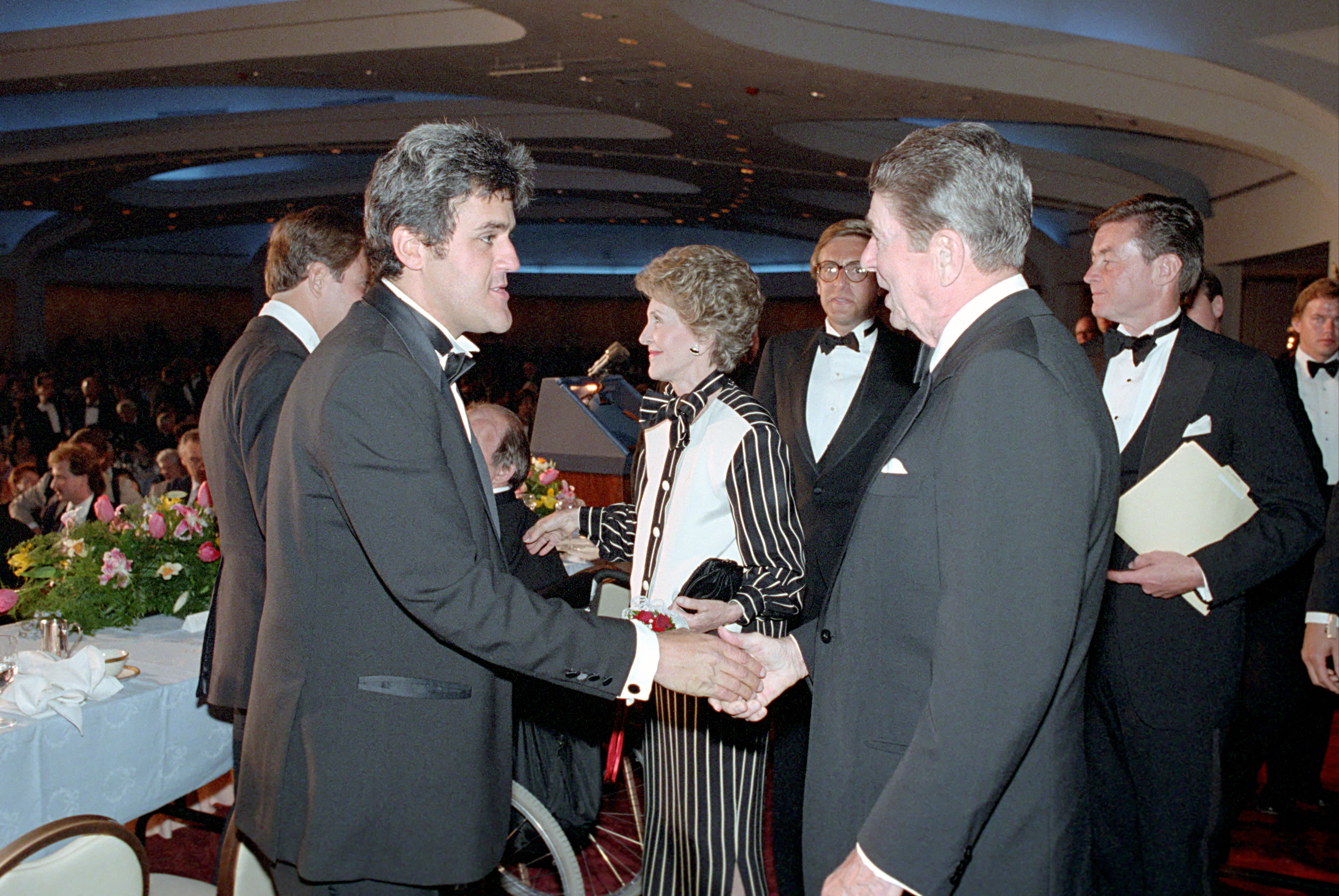
Leno shaking hands with president Ronald Reagan in April 1987

Leno has been married to Mavis Leno since 1980. In 1993, during his first season as host of The Tonight Show, Leno's mother died at the age of 82; and the next year, his father died at 84. Leno's older brother, Patrick, a Vietnam veteran and graduate of Yale Law School, died of cancer in 2002 at the age of 62. In 2024, it was disclosed that Mavis Leno was suffering from an advanced form of dementia when the Los Angeles Superior Court granted Jay Leno conservatorship of the couple's joint estate as she experiences periods of disorientation and at times does not know who her husband is or her own date of birth.

Leno is known for his prominent jaw, which has been described as mandibular prognathism. In the book Leading with My Chin, he says he was aware of surgery that could reset his mandible, but that he did not wish to endure a prolonged healing period with his jaws wired shut.

Leno is dyslexic. He claims to need only four or five hours of sleep each night. He does not consume alcohol, smoke, or gamble. He spends much of his free time visiting car collections and working in his private garage.

Leno has claimed that he has not spent any of the money he earned from The Tonight Show, but lives off his money from his stand-up routines. He reportedly earned $32 million in 2005. In 2014, he received an Honorary Doctor of Humane Letters degree from Emerson College, where he also delivered the commencement speech. He also received an Honorary Doctorate of Humane Letters from Academy of Art University in 2021.

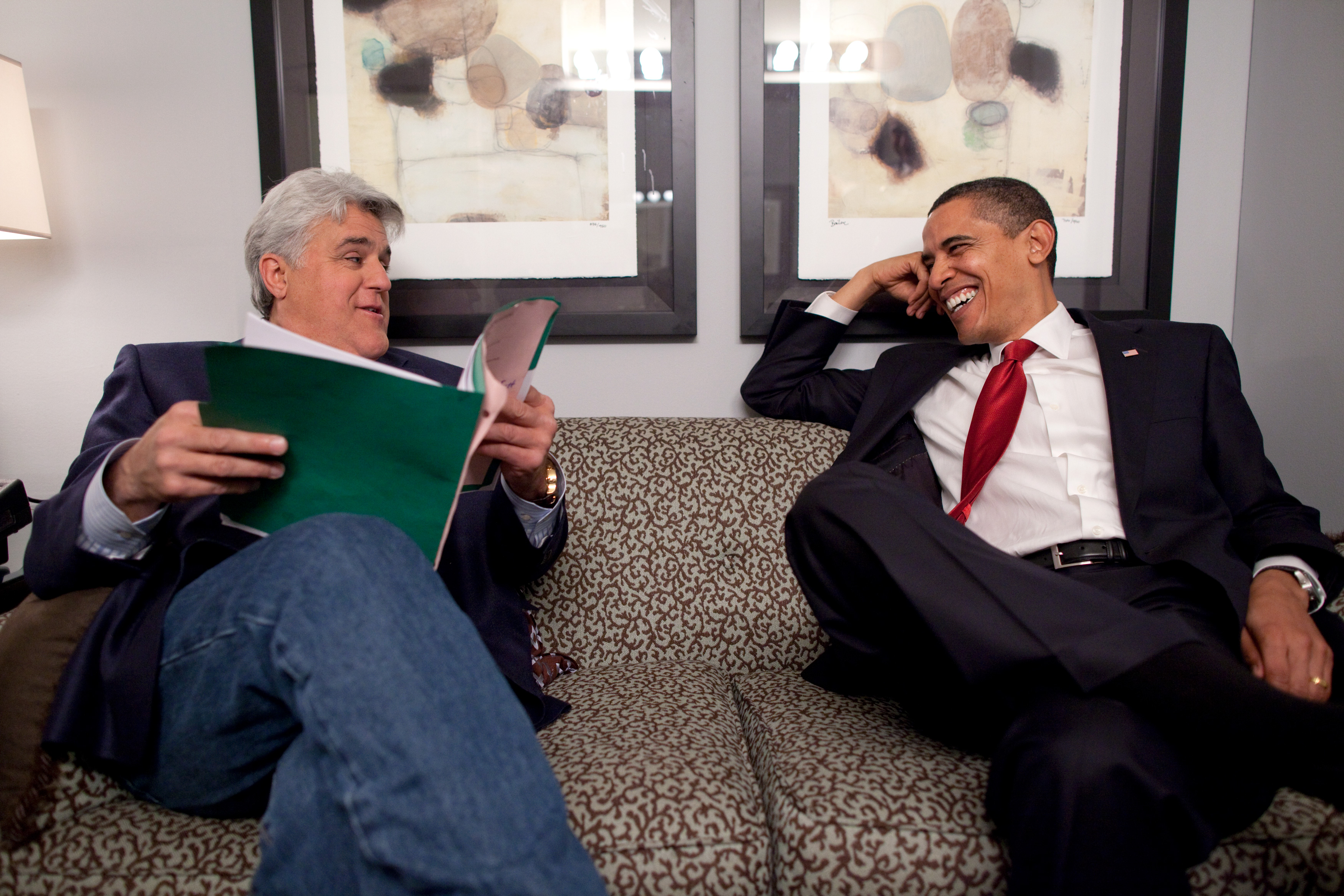
Leno with President Barack Obama in March 2009

On November 12, 2022, Leno suffered "serious burns" to his face and hands when a vehicle at his Los Angeles garage burst into flames. As part of the treatment, he received a "new ear". On January 17, 2023, he sustained multiple broken bones after falling off a motorcycle. On November 16, 2024, Leno broke his right wrist, including tearing the fingernail off his right index finger, and sustained several bruises on his left side, acquiring a periorbital hematoma after he accidentally tripped while walking to go have dinner at Dino's Sports Lounge outside the Hampton Inn in Greensburg, Pennsylvania, causing him to roll straight down a hill landing on the curb.

=== Charity ===
In 2001, he and his wife donated $100,000 to the Feminist Majority Foundation's campaign to stop gender apartheid in Afghanistan, to educate the public regarding the plight of women in Afghanistan under Taliban rule. Mavis Leno is on the board of the Feminist Majority.

In 2009, he donated $100,000 to a scholarship fund at Salem State College (later Salem State University) in honor of Lennie Sogoloff, who gave Leno his start at his jazz club, Lennie's-on-the-Turnpike.

In August 2012, Leno auctioned his Fiat 500, which was sold for $385,000 with all the proceeds going to a charity that helps wounded war veterans recover by providing them with temporary housing.

As of November 2022, Leno sponsored two scholarships at McPherson College.

=== Love Ride ===
Since 1985, Leno has been the grand marshal for the Love Ride, a motorcycle charity event which since its founding in 1984 has raised nearly $14 million for charities benefiting muscular dystrophy research, Autism Speaks, and in 2001, the September 11 attacks recovery.

=== Vehicle collection ===
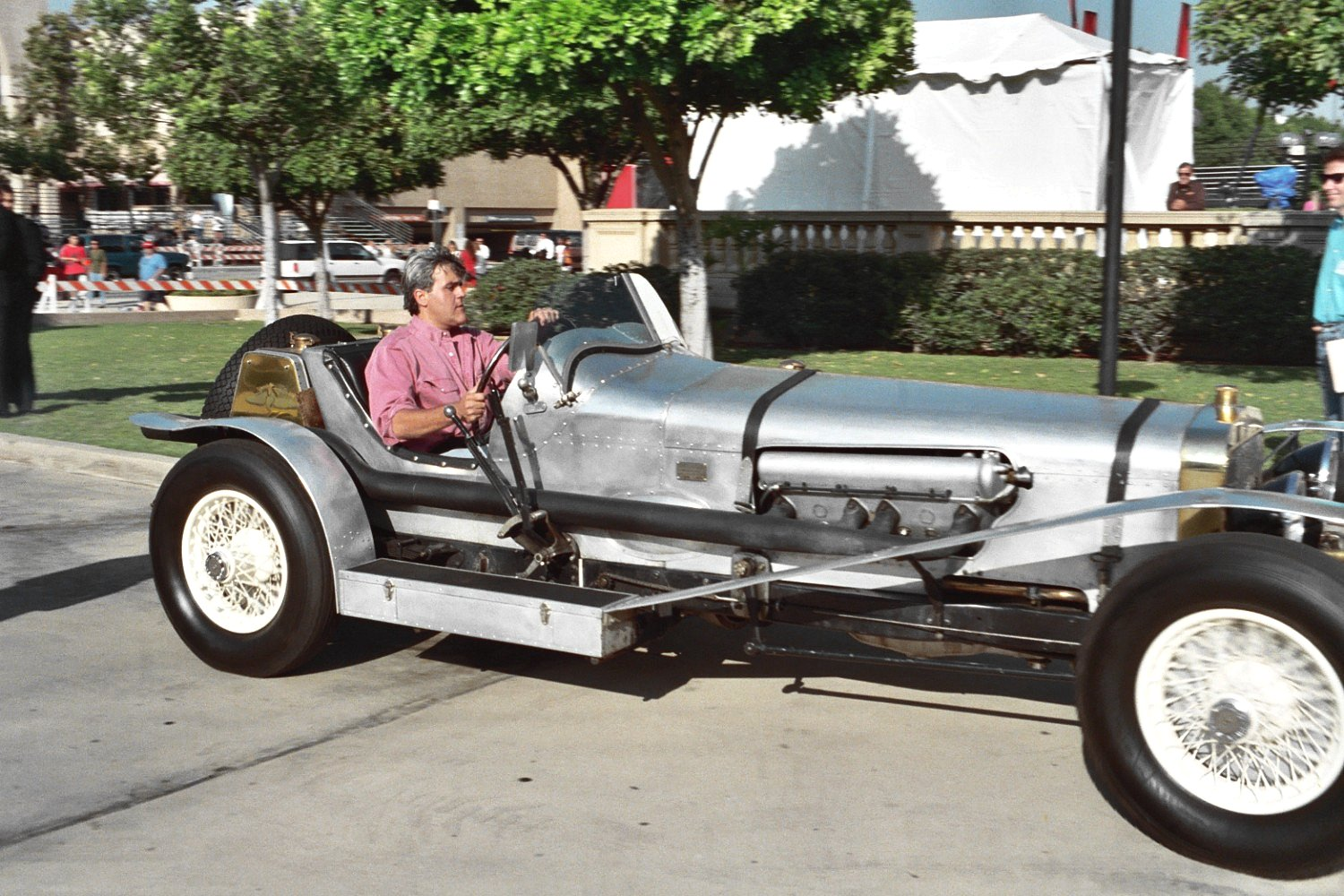
Leno arriving at the 45th Primetime Emmy Awards in his Hispano-Suiza Aero, 1993

Leno owns an extensive collection of vehicles, including at least 181 cars and 160 motorcycles as of late 2024. He also has a website and a TV program called Jay Leno's Garage, which contains video clips and photos of his car collection in detail, as well as other vehicles of interest to him. Leno's garage manager is Bernard Juchli. Among his collection are two Doble steam cars, a sedan and a roadster that were owned by Howard Hughes, the fifth Duesenberg Model X known to survive, and one of nine remaining 1963 Chrysler Turbine Cars. The collection also includes three antique electric cars—the 1909 Baker Motor Vehicle is his wife Mavis's favorite car—and at least two tanks. The most expensive car in the collection is a 1994 McLaren F1 sports car, the first McLaren to be imported to the US, which Leno says he purchased for approximately $800,000 in the late 1990s, and is worth at least $20 million today. The value of the entire collection is at least $52 million.

He has a regular column in Popular Mechanics which showcases his car collection and gives advice about various automotive topics, including restoration and unique models, such as his jet-powered motorcycle and solar-powered hybrid. Leno also writes occasional "Motormouth" articles for The Sunday Times, reviewing high-end sports cars and giving his humorous take on motoring matters.

Leno opened his garage to Team Bondi, the company that developed the 2011 video game L.A. Noire, which is set in Los Angeles in the late-1940s. Leno's collection contains almost 100 cars from this period, and allowed the team to create their images as accurately as possible.

A bill to exempt cars from before 1981 from the state's emissions regulations, Senate Bill 1392, also known as "Leno's Law," was signed into law in September 2026 and will take effect in 2028.

=== Politics ===
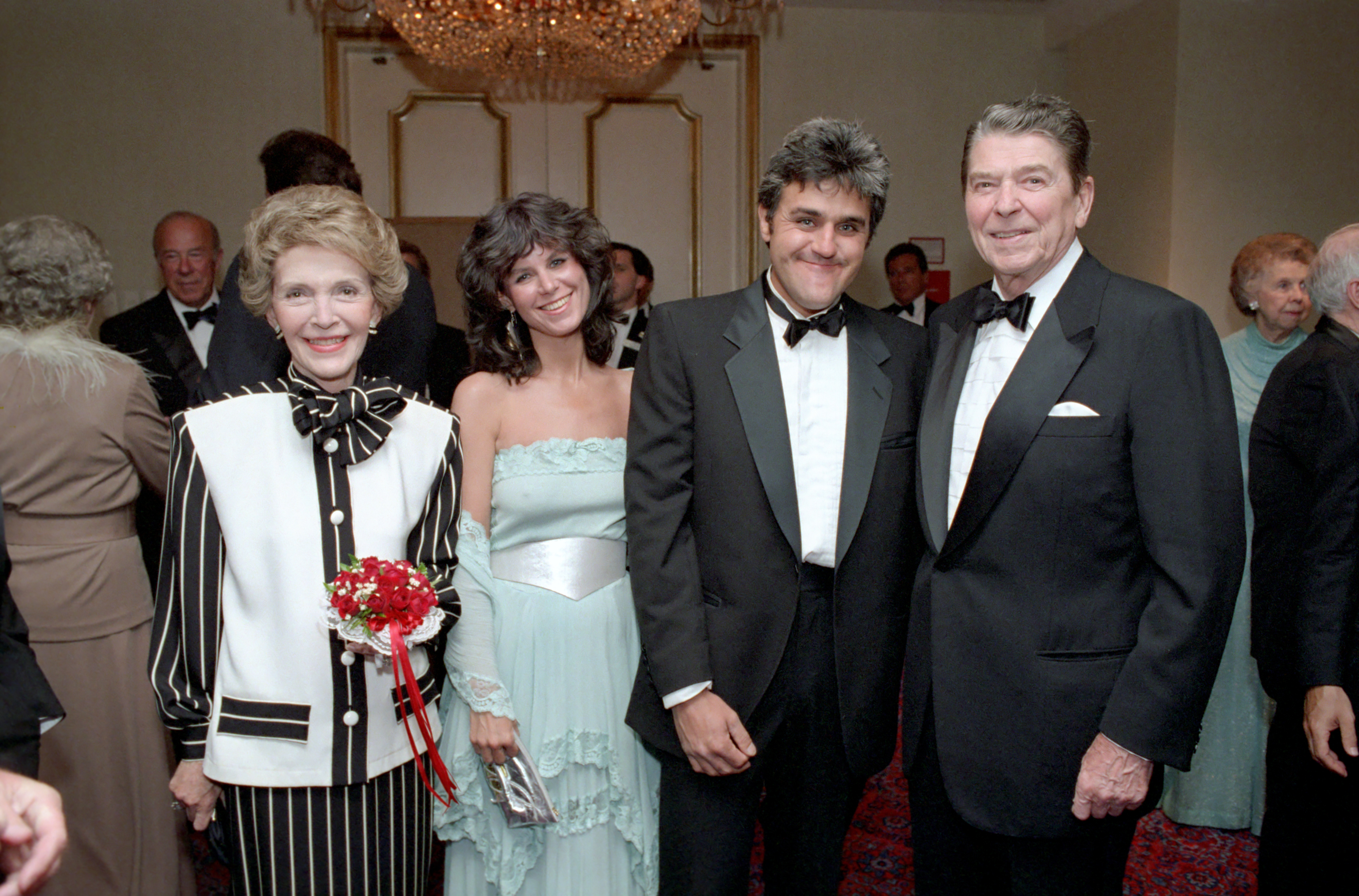
With President Ronald Reagan and their wives in 1987

Hosting the 2014 Genesis Prize award ceremony in Jerusalem, Leno made jokes mocking then-President Barack Obama and then-Secretary of State John Kerry, accusing Obama of "trying to break" the U.S.'s relationship with Israel.

In a 2015 interview with The Jerusalem Post, Leno said, "I always considered Israel as not only the only democracy in the Middle East, I think it's the purest, because every Israeli voter seems to have his own political party." He also added about Israel's relations with other Middle Eastern countries: "Israel is so efficient in defending itself and so good at it, that to the rest of the world it looks like bullying."

In a 2024 interview on Piers Morgan Uncensored, Leno said that he is "not a fan" of then-former President Donald Trump. Of President Joe Biden, Leno said: "I like him. I think he's a good guy. And, you know, the economy's doing pretty good!"

== Awards and nominations ==
Year	Award	Nominated work	Result
1989	Writers Guild of America Award for Variety – Musical, Award, Tribute, Special Event	Family Comedy Hour	Nominated
1990	American Comedy Award for Funniest Male Performer in a TV Special – Network, Cable or Syndication	The Tonight Show Starring Johnny Carson	Nominated
1993	Primetime Emmy Award for Outstanding Variety, Music, or Comedy Series	The Tonight Show with Jay Leno	Nominated
1994	Primetime Emmy Award for Outstanding Variety, Music, or Comedy Series	The Tonight Show with Jay Leno	Nominated
1995	Primetime Emmy Award for Outstanding Variety, Music, or Comedy Series	The Tonight Show with Jay Leno	Won
1996	Primetime Emmy Award for Outstanding Variety, Music, or Comedy Series	The Tonight Show with Jay Leno	Nominated
1998	Primetime Emmy Award for Outstanding Variety, Music, or Comedy Series	The Tonight Show with Jay Leno	Nominated
1998	Primetime Emmy Award for Outstanding Individual Performance in a Variety or Music Program	The Tonight Show with Jay Leno	Nominated
1999	TV Guide Award for Favorite Late Night Show	The Tonight Show with Jay Leno	Won
1999	Primetime Emmy Award for Outstanding Variety, Music, or Comedy Series	The Tonight Show with Jay Leno	Nominated
2000	TV Guide Award for Favorite Late Night Show	The Tonight Show with Jay Leno	Won
2000	Hollywood Walk of Fame		Won
2000	Primetime Emmy Award for Outstanding Variety, Music, or Comedy Series	The Tonight Show with Jay Leno	Nominated
2001	TV Guide Award for Variety Star of the Year	The Tonight Show with Jay Leno	Nominated
2002	Primetime Emmy Award for Outstanding Variety, Music, or Comedy Series	The Tonight Show with Jay Leno	Nominated
2003	Primetime Emmy Award for Outstanding Variety, Music, or Comedy Series	The Tonight Show with Jay Leno	Nominated
2005	People's Choice Award for Favorite Late Night Talk Show Host	The Tonight Show with Jay Leno	Nominated
2005	Primetime Emmy Award for Outstanding Individual Performance in a Variety or Music Program	The Tonight Show with Jay Leno	Nominated
2006	People's Choice Award for Favorite Late Night Talk Show Host	The Tonight Show with Jay Leno	Won
2007	People's Choice Award for Favorite Talk Show Host	The Tonight Show with Jay Leno	Nominated
2008	People's Choice Award for Favorite Talk Show Host	The Tonight Show with Jay Leno	Nominated
2008	Primetime Emmy Award for Outstanding Short–Format Non-Fiction Program	Jay Leno's Garage	Nominated
2009	Primetime Emmy Award for Outstanding Short–Format Non-Fiction Program	Jay Leno's Garage	Nominated
2011	Primetime Emmy Award for Outstanding Short–Format Non-Fiction Program	Jay Leno's Garage	Won
2011	Hasty Pudding Man of the Year		Won
2012	People's Choice Award for Favorite Late Night TV Host	The Tonight Show with Jay Leno	Nominated
2012	Primetime Emmy Award for Outstanding Short–Format Non-Fiction Program	Jay Leno's Garage	Nominated
2013	TCA Career Achievement Award		Nominated
2013	Primetime Emmy Award for Outstanding Short–Format Non-Fiction Program	Jay Leno's Garage	Nominated
2014	TCA Career Achievement Award		Nominated
2014	Mark Twain Prize for American Humor		Won

== Books ==
- Leno, Jay (1989). Headlines: Real but Ridiculous Samplings from America's Newspapers. New York, NY: Warner Books. ISBN 978-0-446-39136-8.
- — (1990). More Headlines. New York, NY: Warner Books. ISBN 978-0-446-39236-5.
- — (1991). Headlines III: Not the Movie, Still the Book. New York, NY: Warner Books. ISBN 978-0-446-39374-4.
- — (1992). Headlines IV: The Next Generation: More Out-of-This World Headlines from the Bestselling Series. New York: Warner Books. ISBN 978-0-446-39417-8.
- — (1994). Jay Leno's Police Blotter: Real-life Crime Headlines from The Tonight Show with Jay Leno. Kansas City: Andrews and McMeel. ISBN 978-0-8362-1751-3.
- —; Zehme, Bill (1996). Leading with My Chin. New York, NY: HarperCollinsPublishers. ISBN 978-0-06-018694-4. (autobiography).
- — (2004). If Roast Beef Could Fly. Illustrated by S. B. Whitehead. New York: Simon & Schuster Books for Young Readers. ISBN 978-0-689-86767-5. (children' book).
- — (2005). How to Be the Funniest Kid in the Whole Wide World (or Just in Your Class). Illustrated by S.B. Whitehead. New York: Simon & Schuster Books for Young Readers. ISBN 978-1-4169-0631-5. (children' book).

Media offices
Preceded by Johnny Carson	Host of The Tonight Show; May 25, 1992 – May 29, 2009	Succeeded by Conan O'Brien
Preceded by Conan O'Brien	Host of The Tonight Show; March 1, 2010 – February 6, 2014	Succeeded by Jimmy Fallon
