= Mavis Biesanz =

Finnish American sociologist

Helmi Mavis Biesanz
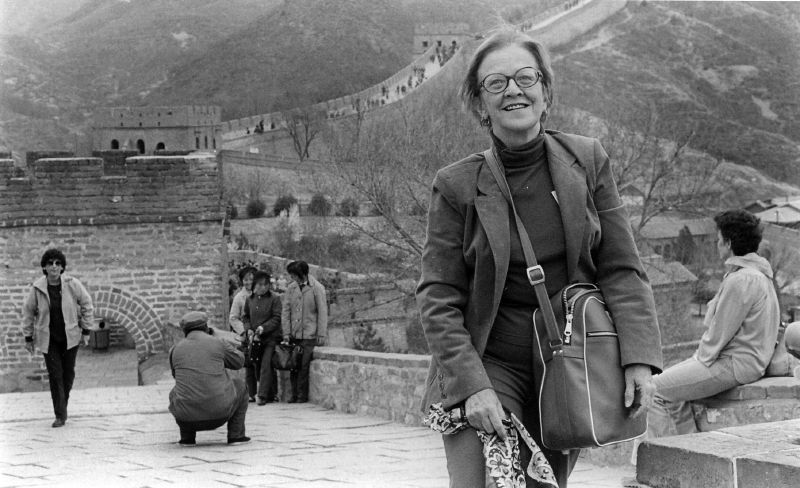
- Born: July 27, 1919; Vermilion Lake Township, Minnesota, United States
- Died: February 21, 2008 (aged 88); Escazú, San José, Costa Rica
- Citizenship: U.S.A. and Costa Rica (dual citizen)
- Scientific career
- Fields: Sociologist and non-fiction writer

Mavis Hiltunen Biesanz (July 27, 1919 Vermilion Lake Township, Minnesota – February 21, 2008 Escazú, Costa Rica) was a Finnish-American writer and sociologist. Many of her books were about Central American countries, particularly Costa Rica. She lived in Costa Rica from 1971 until her death in 2008.

== Life ==
Mavis Biesanz grew up in northern Minnesota. She graduated from Iowa State University in the summer of 1940, summa cum laude grade and Phi Beta Kappa honors. She financed her studies by waiting tables, scrubbing floors, babysitting, and washing dishes. On graduation, she married John Biesanz (1913–1995), with whom she lived until John's death. John was a sociology and anthropology professor, who taught sociology during his career, including at Tulane, Pittsburgh, and Wayne State University. Biesanz made a career as a writer. In addition, she has worked as an English teacher. She wrote two widely used sociology textbooks with her husband, Modern Society: An Introduction to Social Sciences and Introduction to Social Sciences Five others were written about Costa Rican and Panamanian sociology. They had two sons, Richard and Barry, and a daughter, Katja.

== Publications ==
=== Books ===
- John & Mavis Biesanz: Costa Rican Life (La Vida en Costa Rica). Libreria Lehmann, San José, Costa Rica, 1944.
- John & Mavis Biesanz: Modern Society. Prentice-Hall, 1954, 1959, 1964.
- John & Mavis Biesanz: People of Panama. Columbia University Press, 1955.
- Las Amigas Norteamericanas del Paraguay (The North American Friends of Paraguay): Land of Lace and Legend: An Informal Guide to Paraguay. (Mrs. John Biesanz, editor in chief, Mrs. Povenmire Dale, President.) La Colmena, SA, Asunción, 1965.
- John & Mavis Biesanz: Introduction to Sociology. Prentice-Hall, 1969, 1973.
- Richard Biesanz, Karen Zubris Biesanz & Mavis Hiltunen Biesanz: The Costa Ricans. Waveland Press, 1988.
- Mavis Hiltunen Biesanz: Helmi Mavis, a Finnish American Girlhood. North Star Press of St. Cloud, 1989.
- Mavis Hiltunen Biesanz, Richard & Karen Biesanz Zubris Biesanz: The Ticos: Culture and Social Change in Costa Rica. Lynne Rienner Publishers, 1998.
- Mavis Biesanz: Un año con Carmen: Cuentos y poemas. A Year with Carmen: Stories and poems. EUNED, Costa Rica, 2007.

=== Scholarly articles ===
- John & Mavis Biesanz (1941): Social Distance in the Youth Hostel Movement. Sociology and Social Research, XXV, January–February, pp. 237–245.
- John & Mavis Biesanz (1941): The School and the Youth Hostel. Journal of Educational Sociology, Vol 15, No. 1, pp. 55–60.
- John & Mavis Biesanz (1943): Mate Selection Standards of the Costa Rican Students. Social Forces, Vol 22, No. 2, pp. 194–199.

=== Newspaper reprints ===
- The Tico Times, (1981) "Why are Ticos So Different?" Author Mavis Biesanz describes the character and history of a unique people. A Tico Times Publication. 20 pp. Reprint of 10 articles in The Tico Times, 1981. Tico Times, Apartado 4632, San José, Costa Rica
