= Gender apartheid =

Socio-economic, physical, legal, and cultural discrimination based on gender

Gender apartheid (also called sexual apartheid (Note: However, sexual apartheid may refer to separate laws which exist for heterosexual and non-heterosexual people.) or sex apartheid) is the economic and social sexual discrimination against individuals because of their gender or sex. It is a system enforced by using either physical or legal practices to relegate individuals to subordinate positions. Feminist scholar Phyllis Chesler, professor of psychology and women's studies, defines the phenomenon as "practices which condemn girls and women to a separate and subordinate sub-existence and which turn boys and men into the permanent guardians of their female relatives' chastity". Instances of gender apartheid lead not only to the social and economic disempowerment of individuals, but can also result in severe physical harm.

== Etymology ==
The term "gender apartheid" stems from South Africa's racial apartheid that instituted a system of white supremacy (Afrikaans: Baasskap) and separated the country's majority black inhabitants from whites. Afrikaans for "apartness" or "separateness", the use of the term "apartheid" to refer to gender reflects a human rights violation that entails both separation and oppression. In defining apartheid, Dr. Anthony Löwstedt wrote:

The concept of separateness in itself does not necessarily imply that any group is or will be favored over any other... The distinctive characteristic of apartheid and of other kinds of oppressive segregation is that political, economic, social, and even geographic conditions are created consciously and systematically in order to forcibly separate groups, invariably to the benefit—at least the short-term benefit—of at least one of the groups, but never, or only accidentally, to the benefit of all of them.

Gender apartheid is a universal phenomenon and is not confined to a particular country. While reports of gender apartheid have most frequently arisen in the context of Islamic culture, it is prevalent around the world. Some human rights advocates have argued for sanctions against states practicing gender apartheid, similar to those imposed on South Africa under apartheid.

== In religion ==
Instances of gender apartheid have been found institutionalized through religious and cultural practices. For example, aspects of the treatment of women under fundamentalist interpretations of Islam, Christianity, Judaism, and Buddhism have been described as gender apartheid. Use of faith, often through strict interpretations of religious code, to justify gender apartheid is highly controversial.

=== Christianity ===
The terms gender apartheid and sexual apartheid have also been used to describe differential treatment of women in institutions such as the Church of England and the Roman Catholic Church. Presbyterian minister and author Patricia Budd Kepler points towards women's institutionalized struggle for acceptance into clergy and religious leadership roles as an example of gender apartheid. Specifically, Kepler criticizes the traditional conceptions of masculinity and femininity that limit female authority in the church, insisting instead that women's entrance into the ministry does not disrupt divine order. Similarly, author Susan D. Rose describes the patriarchal family structure of evangelical Christian churches in America as maintaining gender apartheid.

The Roman Catholic Church has been identified as perpetuating gender apartheid due to the Vatican's listing of "the attempted sacred ordination of a woman" as a delicta graviora—in other words, a crime of equal standing to sexual molestation of minors, and "acquisition, possession or distribution of [child] pornography by a cleric". In light of such, some have characterized the Catholic Church as endorsing patriarchy and subsequently alienating women from leadership roles within religion.

=== Islam ===
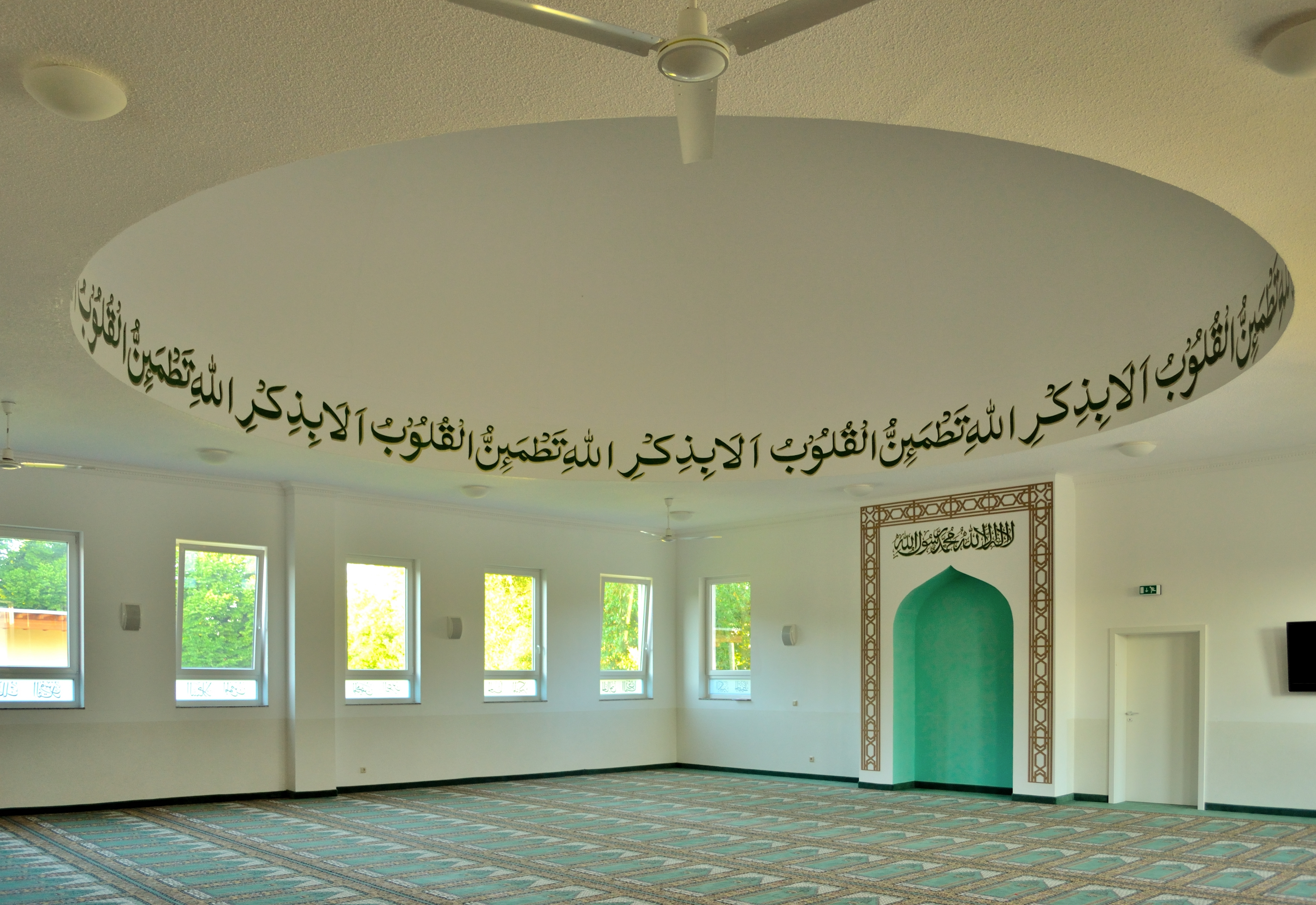
Female-only prayer room in a mosque

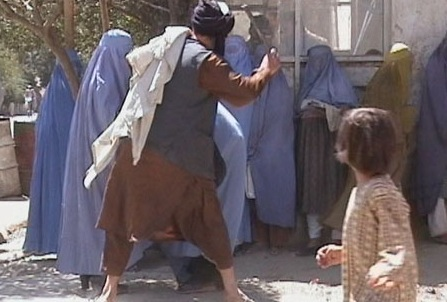
A member of the Taliban's religious police beating a woman in Kabul on 26 August 2001 (footage filmed by RAWA). Under Taliban rule, Afghan women were forced to cover their entire bodies.

The Islamic religion has been criticised for the discriminatory nature of its personal status laws and criminal code as applied to women. Islam's patriarchal values remain one of its most contested principles, according to differing schools of thought. Generally, however, male and female rights differ considerably according to Islamic personal status laws. For instance, Muslim men are permitted to engage in polygamy and marry Non-Muslim women while Muslim women are forbidden from having multiple husbands and marrying non-Muslim men, and female inheritances are half of their male sibling's. Furthermore, conviction by Islamic criminal jurisprudence further discriminates against women, as it relies heavily on witness testimony. Female testimonies alone are considered insufficient to convict a murderer, requiring a male testimony for validation.

The observance of sexual modesty and plain dress for both Muslim men and women is prescribed by the ḥadīth literature and sunnah (deeds and sayings attributed to the Islamic prophet Muhammad and his companions); the practice of forced veiling is perceived in some areas as a form of gender apartheid. The practice of forced veiling is, according to Shahrzad Mojab, not due to any universal Islamic code; rather, Shahrzad states "the practice has risen under different contextual circumstances". The dress code imposed in Afghanistan under the Taliban regime and schools that require girls to wear a headscarf have been cited as examples of forced veiling. These policies of forced veiling have been criticized as coercive instruments for gender segregation that deny female autonomy and agency. However, objections to this argument suggest that forced veiling does not constitute gender apartheid and that social constructions of the veil have wrongfully made it a symbol of gender inequality. During the five-year history of the First Islamic Emirate of Afghanistan, the Taliban regime interpreted the Sharia law in accordance with the Hanafi school of Islamic jurisprudence and the religious edicts of Mullah Omar. Women were banned from working, girls were forbidden to attend schools or universities, were requested to observe purdah and to be accompanied outside their households by male relatives; those who violated these restrictions were punished. Men were forbidden to shave their beards and required to let them grow and keep them long according to the Taliban's liking, and to wear turbans outside their households.

Women's rights activist Mahnaz Afkhami writes that the Islamic fundamentalist worldview "singles out women's status and her relations to society as the supreme test of the authenticity of the Islamic order." This is symbolized by the institutions of purdah (physical separation of the sexes) and awrah (concealing the body with clothing). As in much of the world, institutions suppressing women were becoming less powerful until the resurgence of Islamic fundamentalism at the end of the 20th century. Walid Phares writes that Marxism in the Soviet Union and China, as well as "secular anticlericalism" in Turkey forced women to "integrate themselves into an antireligious society" resulting in a backlash of "gender apartheid" by Islamic fundamentalists. He notes that other religions also have "witnessed similar historical struggles."

=== Judaism ===
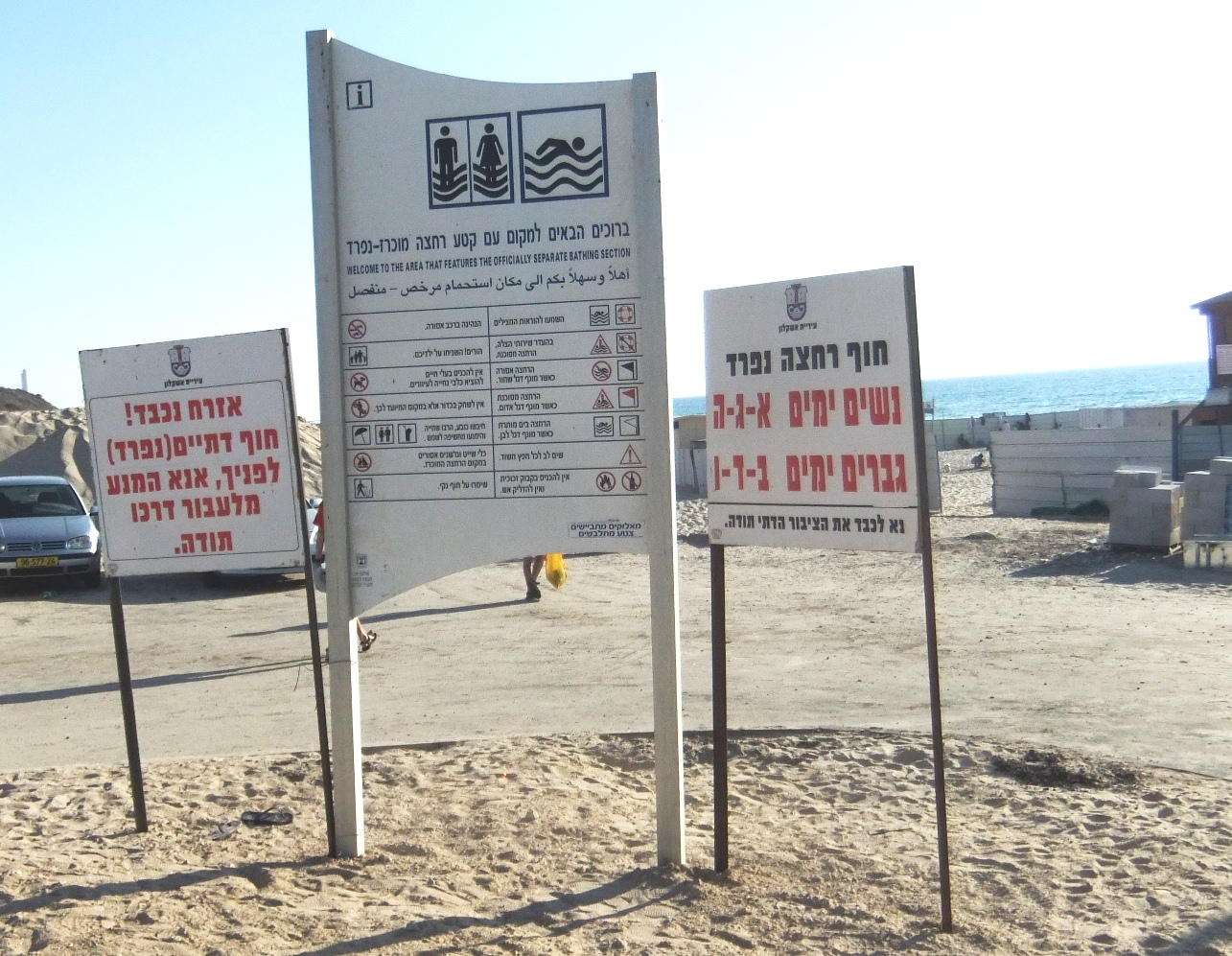
Sign at an Israeli beach for segregated bathing, to accommodate Haredi Jews

Haredi Judaism, also known as ultra-Orthodox Judaism, has been criticized for instituting gender apartheid policies and beliefs. Comprising a small but steadily growing minority within the Jewish culture, Haredi Judaism is distinguished as a community of scholars, with a significantly larger proportion of men continuing their education in yeshiva than women in seminary. Followers of Haredi Judaism are also distinct for their clothing and general appearance: unshaven beards, long dark overcoats, and wide-brimmed hats for men; and modestly covered women. Accusations of gender apartheid point towards the culture's repressive nature and sex segregation, as well as the demonization of females as sexual temptation. Additionally, public images of women have been defaced in Haredi communities, and young Jewish girls have been spat on and called prostitutes for wearing clothing deemed immodest. Reports suggest that it is largely Haredi fundamentalists who are responsible for acts of gender apartheid, and that the Haredi community as a whole does not condone such practices.

Actions of fundamentalist Haredi Jews in Israel have been referred to as gender apartheid. While women customarily sit in the back of buses in parts of Israel, no formal edict enforces such. However, one incident arose in December 2011 in which a Haredi man asked a woman seated in the front of the bus to move towards the back; her subsequent refusal spurred a larger gathering. Police intervention ultimately broke apart the confrontation. Regarding the event, Israeli Prime Minister Benjamin Netanyahu expressed his support for public spaces for all and unity within the community. There have also been reports of Haredi Jews spitting at women, attacking television crews, and protesting with signs instructing women how to dress and to avoid walking by synagogues.

=== Buddhism ===
Certain Tibetan Buddhist schools require women to process into seminaries and other forms of worship after the men. They are also segregated from men during these events and many other occasions; for example, informal gatherings and dinners, especially when these take place in the presence of a senior monk. There is also anecdotal evidence of men and women—including husbands and wives—being forced to take separate transportation to some Buddhist events and even being required to stay in separate hotel rooms when they are attending them.

== Case studies ==
Many countries in the world exhibit acts of gender apartheid, though they are more commonly evidenced in the developing world. The following are nations that have purportedly practiced some instance of gender apartheid.

=== Afghanistan ===
Afghanistan, under Taliban religious leadership, has been characterized by feminist groups and others as a system of gender apartheid in which women were segregated from men in public and could not enjoy legal freedoms or equal access to employment or education. Rising to power in late 1996, the Taliban accrued international attention for its treatment of women, enacting policies that limited women's freedom of movement, employment, and education rights. Under Taliban rule, women were at risk for detainment and physical abuse if found guilty for violating the imposed dress code, with violations that included: exposure of the hands, wrist, feet, or face; not wearing a burqa; and wearing items perceived to be offensive, e.g. white socks/shoes, stylish clothing, shoes that make noise while walking.

In June 2023, U.N. Special Rapporteur on the situation of human rights in Afghanistan, Richard Bennett, told the Human Rights Council in Geneva about "gender apartheid" in Afghanistan.

=== Iran ===
During the late 20th and early 21st centuries in Iran, women's rights have been severely restricted, compared with those in most developed nations. The World Economic Forum's 2017 Global Gender Gap Report ranked Iran 140, out of 144 countries, for gender parity. In 2017, in Iran, females comprised just 19% of the paid workforce, with seven percent growth since 1990. In 2017, the Georgetown Institute for Women, Peace and Security (WPS) Index ranked Iran in the bottom tercile of 153 countries. Compared to other South Asian regions, women in Iran have a better access to financial accounts, education, and cellphones. Iran was ranked 116, out of the 153 countries, in terms of legal discrimination against women.

=== Malaysia ===
In 2006, Marina Mahathir, the daughter of Malaysia's former Prime Minister and an active campaigner for women's rights, described the status of Muslim women in Malaysia as similar to that of Black South Africans under apartheid. Marina's remarks were made in response to a new Islamic law that enables men to divorce or take up to four wives. The law also granted husbands more authority over their wives' property. Conservative groups such as the Malaysian Muslim Professionals Forum criticized her comments for insulting Sharia and undermining the prominent role of women in Malaysia compared to other Muslim and east Asian countries.

=== Pakistan ===
Pakistani society has been described as employing gender apartheid due to the subordinate status of women in political, economic, and social spheres. For instance, the Citizens Act of 1951 prevents Pakistani women with foreign husbands from obtaining for their spouses Pakistani citizenship. The gender disparities in economic activity, education and literacy, and societal sex ratio have also been cited as evidence of systematic gender apartheid in Pakistan.

Some studies suggest that gender roles in Pakistani society are transmitted via primary and secondary school textbooks, by neglecting to include important female figures in history and social studies. Gender apartheid is therefore institutionalized through text and images in which women are appropriated to domestic roles and rarely portrayed working outside of the house. Moreover, in terms of personality and disposition, males and females are characterized as distinct opposites: while women are "vain, silly and stupid", men are "intelligent, brave and strong". Consequently, socialized gender roles reinforce and perpetuate gender apartheid.

Efforts to stop discriminatory treatment of women have been made through policies such as the Women's Protection Bill, enacted by Pakistan's National Assembly in December 2006. The act amended the Hudood Ordinance that dictated punishment for various crimes such as rape, theft, and adultery. Previously, the Hudood Ordinances were a subject of controversy for their misogynistic nature and purportedly legal subjugation of women. For instance, female rape victims could be convicted on the basis that their rape amounted to adultery and fornication if not proven otherwise.

=== Saudi Arabia ===
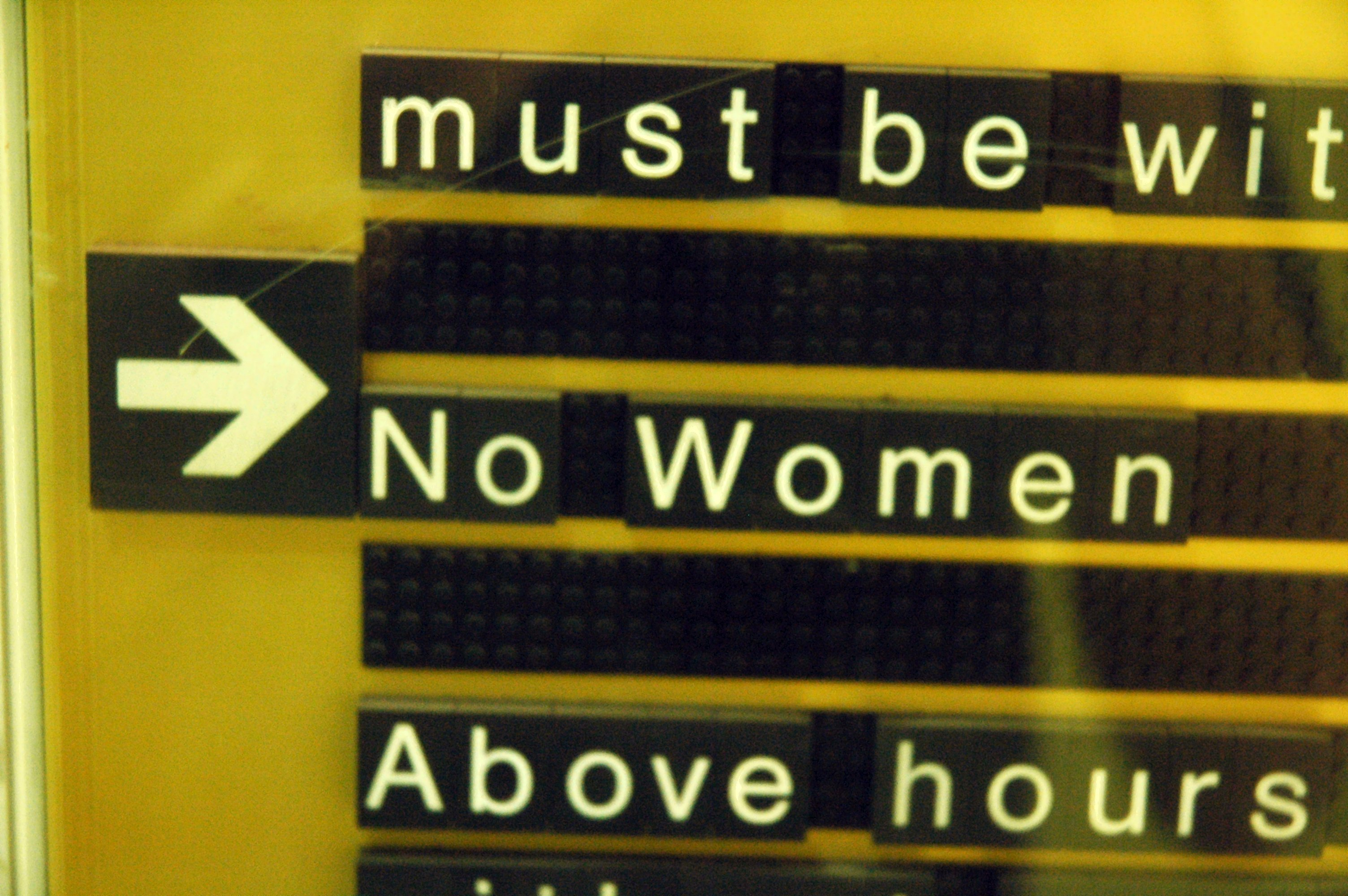
Sign prohibiting women from a gymnasium in the Marriott Hotel in Jeddah

Saudi Arabia's practices with regard to women have been referred to consistently as gender apartheid. Acts of gender apartheid purportedly manifest in many different forms, such as the ban on women from physical education in school and from watching sporting events at stadiums. Women were formerly prohibited from driving and still require male permission in order to travel. The Commission for the Promotion of Virtue and the Prevention of Vice oversees the enforcement of sex segregation in Saudi Arabian civil life; any unlawful mixing between the sexes is punished harshly. The Saudi education system also enforces strict gender roles by teaching that women's subservience is innate to womanhood. More recently, a new technology system has been introduced that alerts male guardians by text when their female dependent has left the country. In general, women in Saudi Arabia possess the same legal rights as minors and cannot make major decisions, e.g. in education, work, and healthcare, without the consent of a male relative.

Marginalization of women in Saudi society has generated great pressure both domestically and internationally. Recent advancements have been seen in light of Arab Spring and the 2011–2012 Saudi Arabian protests, such as King Abdullah granting women's suffrage in the 2015 municipal elections. Additionally, Saudi Arabia has also lifted some restrictions on the use of motorbikes and bicycles by women; women may now bike in certain spaces if properly attired in the abaya and accompanied by a male guardian.

== Social interventions ==
Scholars and activists alike have criticized international law for its lack of initiative and public action in recognizing particular acts as gender apartheid and acting to prevent it. According to these critics, cultural relativism has too often been a source of defense for gender apartheid, by safeguarding women's oppression from change and subversion. The rhetoric surrounding gender apartheid has also been viewed negatively as a form of neocolonialism that perpetuates stereotypes of Islam. The United Nations' response to the Taliban's human rights violations against women in Afghanistan has in particular been the subject of much controversy. Some argue that the UN "not only failed to prevent and, later, to become an effective opponent of the gender policies of the Taliban regime, but that it actually incorporated discrimination against women in its humanitarian assistance and in the recruitment of local staff."

In 1997, the Feminist Majority Foundation (FMF) launched the Campaign to Stop Gender Apartheid in Afghanistan, calling attention to the human rights abuses against women under the Taliban. It has been criticized for promoting "imperial feminism" and for possessing an exploitative tone that denounces Islam as evil. Following the fall of the Taliban regime, the campaign has since expanded and been renamed to become the Campaign for Afghan Women and Girls. It is chaired by Mavis Leno and aims to continue raising awareness of gender inequality in Afghanistan.

The No Women, No Play campaign was launched in 2009 by the Hadi Al Mutif Program for Human Rights at the Institute for Gulf Affairs to address women's status in Saudi Arabia. The campaign aims to ban Saudi Arabia from the Olympics until it allows Saudi Arabian women to take part in sports. In its charter, the International Olympic Committee (IOC) declares that participation in sporting activities is a human right. Besides the No Women, No Play campaign, other organizations such as Human Rights Watch have drawn public attention to Saudi Arabia for its sporting restrictions against women.

In regards to gender apartheid in Roman Catholicism specifically, the Roman Catholic Womenpriests (RCWP) formed to defy the church position banning the ordination of women. The group has since accrued further intention with the release of the 2011 documentary Pink Smoke over the Vatican.

== See also ==
- All-women shortlist
- Apartheid (South African law)
- Athos, a Greek peninsula where women are not allowed
- Convention on the Elimination of All Forms of Discrimination Against Women
- Female genital mutilation
- Femicide
- Feminist separatism
- Gender equality
- Gender segregation
- Global Gender Gap Report
- Hegemonic masculinity
- Misogyny
- Okinoshima, a Japanese island where women are not allowed
- Sex segregation
- Sexism
- Violence against women
- Women-only space
