= Mavis Leno =

American activist (born 1946)

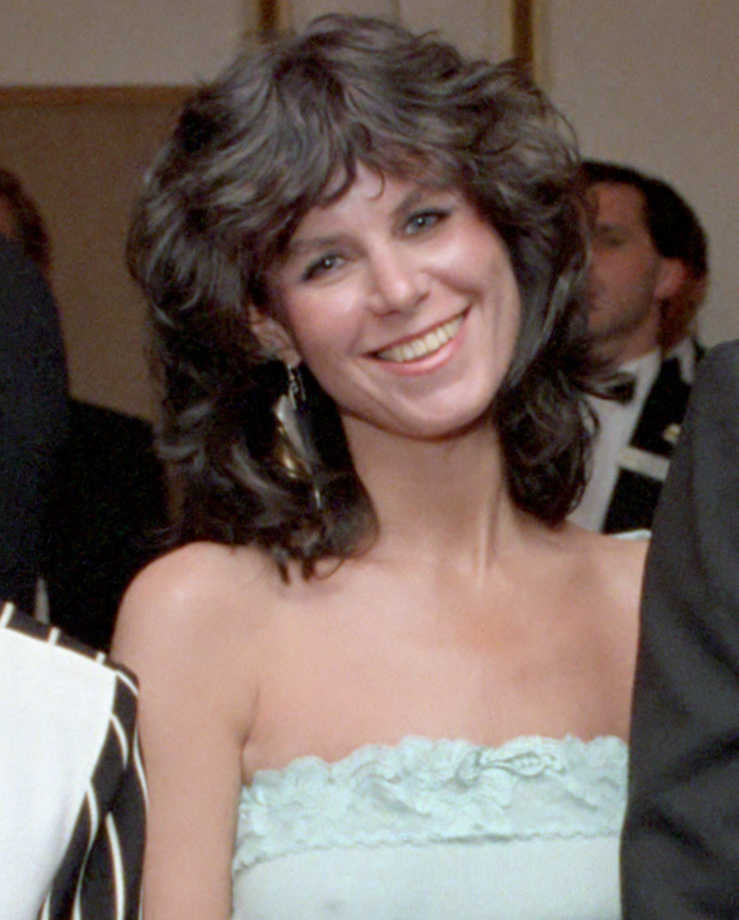
- Leno in 1987
- Born: Mavis Elizabeth Nicholson; September 5, 1946 (age 80); San Francisco, California, United States
- Spouse: Jay Leno (m. 1980)

Mavis Elizabeth Nicholson Leno (born September 5, 1946) is an American activist and philanthropist, and wife of Jay Leno, the former host of The Tonight Show.

Leno keeps a low profile in comparison to her husband, choosing instead to work behind the scenes of the non-profit groups she supports and runs. Leno has been the chair of the Feminist Majority Foundation's Campaign to Stop Gender Apartheid in Afghanistan since 1997. In 1999, Leno and her husband donated $100,000 to the organization, to further the cause of educating the public about the plight of Afghan women under the Taliban. The organization successfully protested the construction of an oil pipeline through Afghanistan, which could potentially have brought in billions of dollars to the Taliban. According to Melissa Rossi, Leno was a driving force in changing the opinion of U.S. President Bill Clinton and the executives of the now defunct oil company Unocal Corporation concerning the Taliban, after Leno had shed light on the group's treatment of women.

In January 2024, Jay Leno filed a petition for conservatorship of Mavis's estate, stating she has dementia. According to a report for the court written by a neurologist, she experiences periods of disorientation and at times does not know who her husband is or her own date of birth. The application for conservatorship was granted on April 9, 2024. Mavis Leno's lawyer told the court she was "in agreement" with the conservatorship and she told the court that she was "receiving excellent care" from her husband. The couple made a public appearance several weeks later at the premiere of Jerry Seinfeld's film, Unfrosted.

She currently resides with her husband in Newport, Rhode Island.
