= Barry Biesanz =

Costa Rican woodturner

Barry Charles Biesanz (born September 1, 1948, in New Orleans), also known as Barry Biesanz Hiltunen, is a woodturner who became a Costa Rican citizen in 1998.

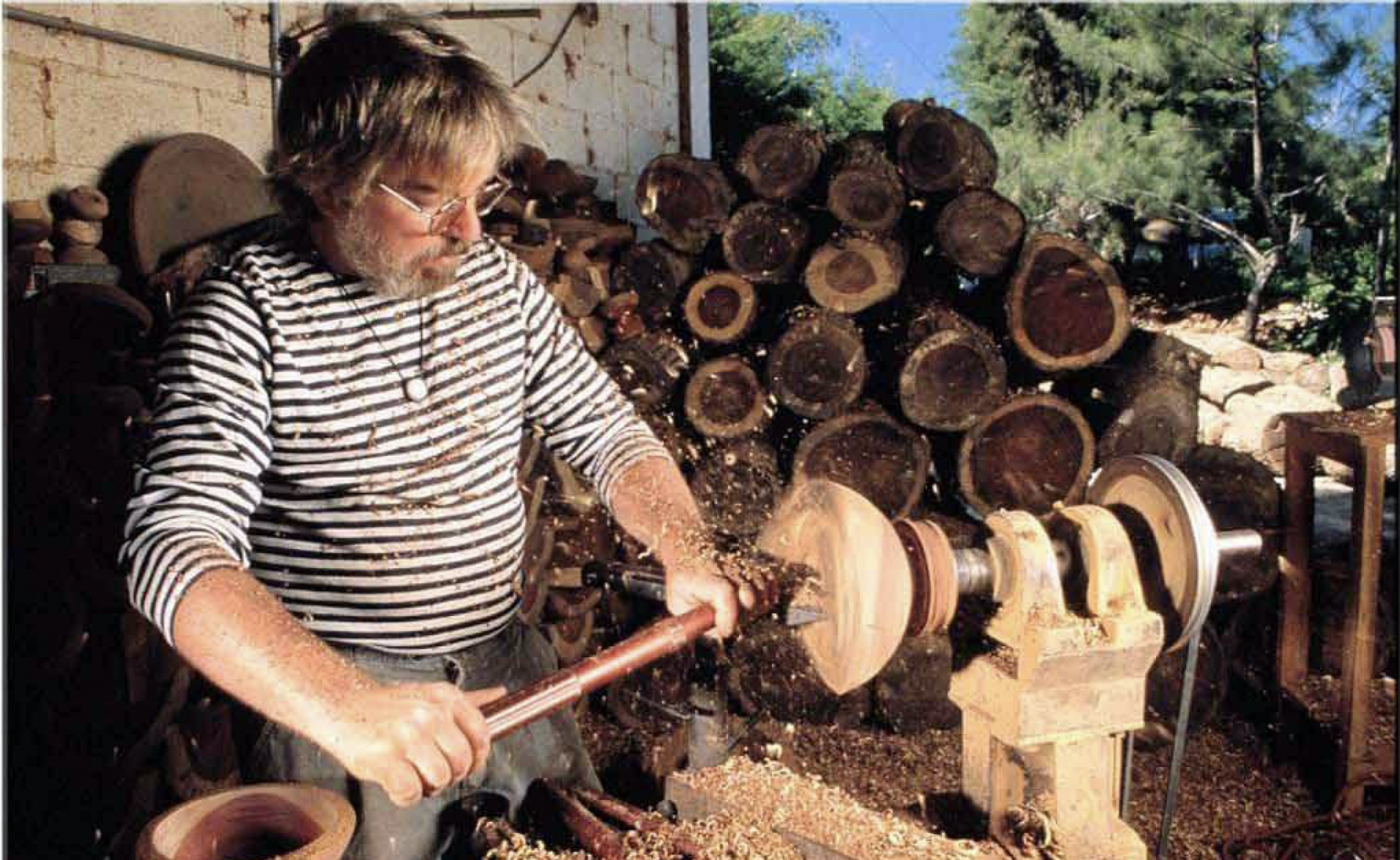
Barry Biesanz working on the lathe.

== Life ==
As a 17 year old Detroit high school student, Barry received national press coverage for protesting the Vietnam war. Newsweek quoted him in a 1966 article on "The Teenagers" as saying "I got my hair cut. But now they are regulating ideas and I can't get my ideas cut." Another publication on the attitudes of 1966 teenagers, The young adult; identity and awareness also quoted him on this.

Barry Biesanz moved to Costa Rica in 1971 and founded Biesanz Woodworks in 1972.

== Woodturning Press Coverage ==
- 2006 "Biesanz Turns Out Masterpieces in Escazú" The Tico Times
- 2005 "Barry Biesanz He Found Woodturner's Heaven" Woodturning Design Spring 2005
- 2004 Beneath The Bark: Twenty-Five Years of Woodturning. Christensen, Kip & Nish, Dale. The catalogue of an exhibition at the Brigham Young Museum of Art, Provo, Utah.
- 2002 "Artisan's Work Prized By Many" The Leader Post, May 31, pg 53
- 2002 "Costa Rica for Wood Art" Edmonton Journal May
- 2002 "Plant Tree, Save Culture" Harbour City Star, June 5
- 2001 "Wood From Start to Finish Stars in Tour," Tico Times, December 14, 2001
- 1997 "Crafts with the Scent of Wood," Costa Rica Today, Jan 23, 1997
- 1995 "Un Encuentro Feliz," American Woodturner, September 1995 pg 28 by Connie Mississippi
- 1995 "Bowled Over by Costa Rica," Excerpt from The Dallas Morning News, August 13, 1995 pg 7G by Terry Hong
- 1994 "Arbolitos a su alcance," La Nacion Rincón Verde, Viva pg 2 by Vanessa Bravo, October 19, 1994
- 1993 "Biesanz, A Master Craftsman in Wood" Costa Rica Today April 29
- 1993 "Taipei International Exhibition of Traditional Arts and Crafts: Selected Overseas Exhibits" January 16 - 29th pp 96
- 1993 "Barry Biesanz Master Woodworker," American Airlines Guide Magazine
- 1992 "Magia de Madera" La Nacion, shopping section, September 15–22, page 8
- 1992 "Noted Woodworker Backs Need to Conserve Forests” Tico Times Special Supplement January 1992
- 1991 "Queen Sofia of Spain buys Biesanz Art, Tico Scene, Tico Times, April 26, 1991
- 1991 “The Noble Woods of Costa Rica – God Creates Them, Biesanz Works Them” Join Us – Costa Rica Awaits You Magazine, page 54
- 1989/1990 "Featuring the Work of Barry Biesanz" International Woodworking, Cover article, Winter edition Vol. VI, No. 1
- 1989 "Northwest Highlights" WestArt, April 14, 1989 Exhibition with Moulthrop and Ellsworth
- 1987 "Shopper's World, Costa Rican Wood" New York Times, August 23, page 10012
- 1987 "Shopping for Costa Rican Handicrafts" International Herald Tribune, August 28, 1987
- 1984 “Barry Biesanz” Tico Times, June 1, 1984 by M.E.Esquivel
