= Mavis Ehlert =

British-Canadian sculptor

Una Mavis Ehlert (30 January 1922 – 14 December 2007) was a British-Canadian sculptor.

== Early life and education ==
Ehlert was born in Bristol, England. Her brother, John Sander, a painter, introduced her to the art world. Ehlert specialized in commercial art and sculpture at St. Martin's School of Art and Chelsea School of Art in England.

== Career ==
Ehlert moved to Ontario, Canada in 1952. She maintained a studio behind her home in Westdale. She mounted her first solo exhibition in 1966.

Ehlert's sculpture known as 'Dianne' sits on a boulder outside the Hamilton Public Library in Ancaster, Ontario. The statue was purchased and donated by Ancaster and Hilltop Garden Clubs for the Canadian Centennial in 1967.

Ehlert made a terracotta sculpture called 'Reflections of a Little Boy' that is on permanent display in a glass box at the Central branch of the Hamilton Public Library in downtown Hamilton, Ontario.

A bust of former hockey coach Reginald Hennessy, sculpted by Ehlert, was installed at the Burlington Central Arena, but was later stolen.

Her sculpted beaver was presented to Kaga, Japan, the twin city of Dundas, Ontario circa 1968. A terracotta bust of Terry Fox by Ehlert was donated by Juliet Margaret Gordon to the Recreational Therapy program of the psychiatric ward at St. Joseph's Hospital in Hamilton.

The Hamilton Club of Hamilton, Ontario bought a bronze reclining figure of a woman for their permanent collection. The Grimsby Art Gallery owns a piece of Ehlert's art, a terra cotta figure called 'Karen', as part of their collection.

Hamilton-Wentworth Creative Arts and CKOC radio nominated Ehlert for her Sculpture in the Excellence in the Arts search. She received a Sculptor of the Year award for her contribution to the Artistic Community at the First Awards Banquet in 1980. Ehlert was presented with a plaque by CJJD radio, (now known as CHAM), CKOC and Creative Arts.

An article by Andrew Dreschel, staff writer for the West Hamilton Journal, credited Ehlert for her large body of work, her many exhibitions in art galleries throughout Ontario. and her representation in both private and public collections.

Ehlert taught sculpture and ceramics at the Jewish Community Centre and Central Secondary School in Hamilton, Ontario. Artist Emy Singer was one of Mavis Ehlert's sculpture students at the Jewish Community Centre. Moura Wolpert of the Jewish Canadian News called Mavis Ehlert a "quiet genius".

Ehlert's work was displayed at a number of solo and group exhibitions. She shared a show at the Art Gallery of Hamilton with Canadian painter Emily Carr. In the 1990s Ehlert exhibited annually at the J.B. Aird Gallery in Toronto. Her 2001 exhibit Bird Forms at the Art Gallery of Hamilton attracted critical acclaim.
