= Patrick Banor =

Ghanaian politician

Hon. Patrick Banor
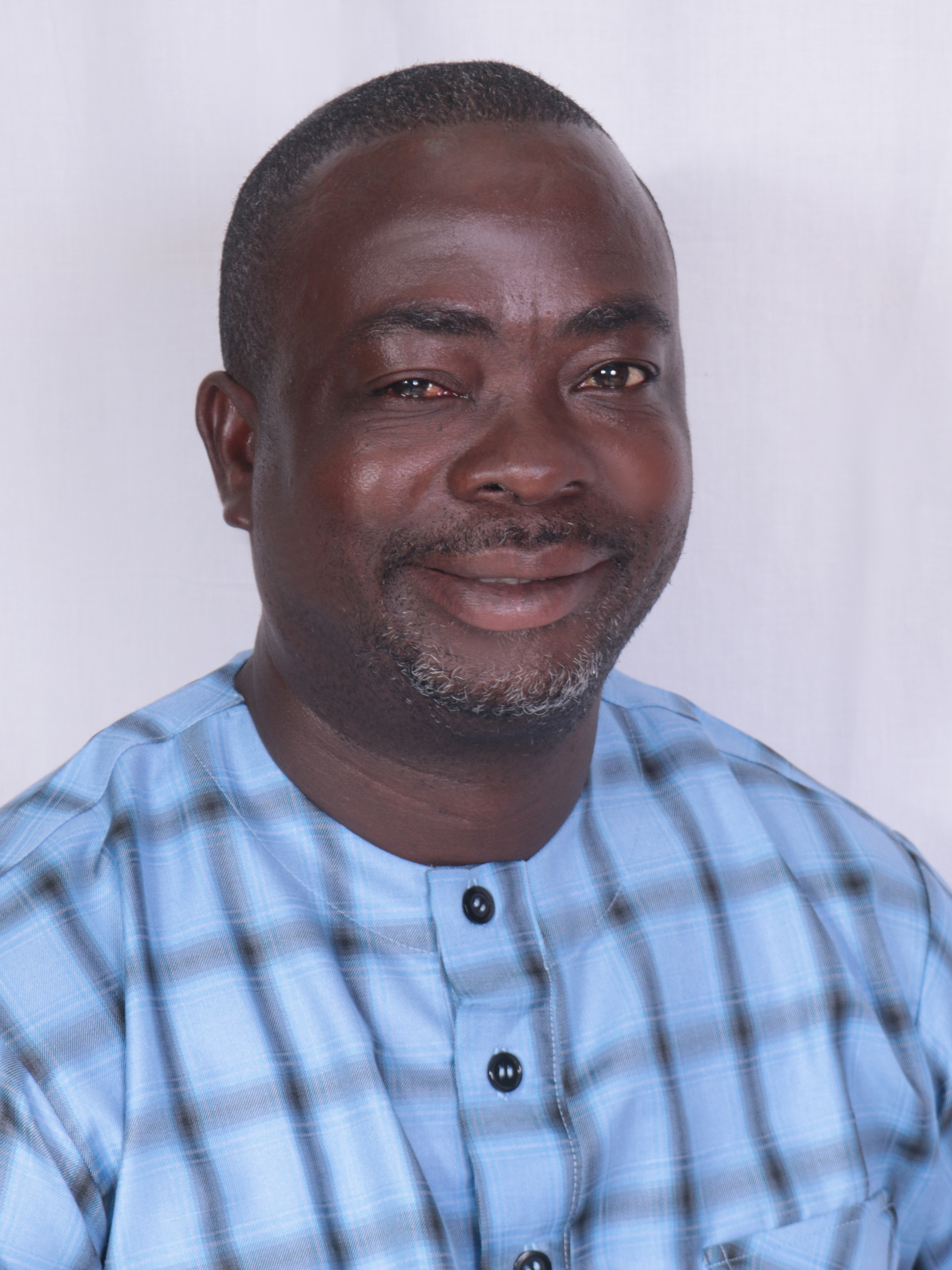

Member of Parliament for Asutifi North Constituency
- In office 7 January 2021 – 6 January 2025
- Preceded by: Benhazin Joseph Dahah
- Succeeded by: Ebenezer Kwaku Addo

Personal details
- Born: Abdul-Razak Tahidu; 13 June 1975 (age 51) Kenyasi No. 2, Ghana
- Party: New Patriotic Party
- Occupation: Politician
- Committees: Subsidiary Legislation Committee, House Committee

Patrick Banor is a Ghanaian politician and an administrator. He was a member the eighth parliament of the fourth republic of Ghana of parliament for the Asutifi North constituency on the ticket of the New Patriotic Party (NPP)

== Early life and education ==
Banor was born on Friday 13 June 1975 at Kenyasi No.2. He obtained his Basic Education Certificate in 1991, and his Secondary School Certificate in 1994. He was awarded his Bachelor of Arts degree in Sociology and Social Work in 2009.

== Career and politics ==
Prior to entering politics, he was the General Manager of Sarfpok Company Limited. During the 2020 NPP parliamentary primaries, Banor contested for the Asutifi North seat against Evans Bobie Opoku and won. During the 2020 Ghanaian general election, Banor contested for the Asutifi North seat with Ebenezer Kwaku Addo of the NDC, and Kofi Annan of GUM. He polled 18505 votes representing 52.62% of the total valid votes cast against Addo's 16546 votes and Anane's 116 votes, representing 47.05% and 0.33% of the total valid votes cast respectively.

=== 2024 Ghanaian general election ===
Hon. Banor again contested the 2024 Ghanaian general election on the ticket of the New Partriotic Party but lost the election to Ebenezer Kwaku Addo of the National Democratic Congress with 14, 207 which is equivalent to 43.33%.

=== Committee ===
Patrick is a member of the Subsidiary Legislation Committee and also a member of the House committee.

== Personal life ==
Patrick is a Christian.

== Philanthropy ==
In September 2020, Patrick provided 1,348 candidates of BECE with mathematical sets.

In August 2021, he presented about 400 desks to Ola Girls' SHS.
