= Henry Yeboah Yiadom-Boachie =

Ghanaian politician

Hon. Henry Yeboah Yiadom-Boachie

Member of the Ghana Parliament for Techiman South Constituency
- In office 7 January 2017 – 6 January 2021
- Preceded by: Adjei Mensah
- Succeeded by: Martin Kwaku Adjei-Mensah Korsah

Personal details
- Born: August 24, 1972 (age 54) Nsuta-Techiman, Ghana
- Party: New Patriotic Party
- Education: GIMPA, Catholic University Southeastern Africa, University of Ghana
- Occupation: Politician
- Profession: Social Worker

Henry Yeboah Yiadom-Boachie is a Ghanaian politician and member of the Seventh Parliament of the Fourth Republic of Ghana representing the Techiman South Constituency in the then Brong Ahafo Region now Bono East Region on the ticket of the New Patriotic Party.

== Early life and education ==
Yiadom-Boachie was born on 24 August 1972 and hails from Nsuta-Techiman in the Bono East Region of Ghana. He has a certificate from GIMPA. He had his Bachelor of Arts degree from the Catholic University Southeastern Africa in Nairobi. He further had his Master of Philosophy from the University of Ghana in 2010.

== Career ==
Yiadom-Boachie was the Youth Animator at the Ondo-Nigeria don Bosco Center from 1999 to 2000. He also was the Vice Principal and Youth Coordinator of Don Bosco Technical School from 2003 to 2005. He was also the Project Coordinator and Education Director of Orphan Aid Africa from 2005 to 2009. He was also the Project Coordinator and Community Development Officer of Newmont Ahafo Development in Ntotroso and also Kenyasi Ahafo Mines from 2009 to 2016.

== Politics ==
Yiadom-Boachie is a member of the New Patriotic Party. He was the member of parliament of Techiman South Constituency from 2017 to 2021. In the 2016 Ghanaian general elections, he won the Techiman South parliamentary seat with 37,257 votes making 50.47% of the total votes cast whilst the NDC parliamentary candidate Adjei Mensah had 35,684 votes making 48.33% of the total votes cast and the PPP parliamentary candidate Sumaila Ibrahim had 886 votes making 1.20% of the total votes cast. During the New Patriotic Party parliamentary primaries in 2020, he did not file his nomination for re-election which paved way for Martin Kwaku Adjei-Mensah Korsah.

== Personal life ==
Yiadom-Boachie is a Christian.
