= Asunafo North (Ghana parliament constituency) =

Constituency in the Ahafo Region of Ghana

- constituency for the Parliament of Ghana
- District: Asunafo North Municipal District
- Region: Ahafo Region of Ghana

Current constituency
- Party: National Democratic Congress
- MP: Mohammed Haruna

Asunafo North is one of the constituencies represented in the Parliament of Ghana and also one of the six constituencies in the Ahafo Region of Ghana. It elects one Member of Parliament (MP) by the first past the post system of election. Evans Opoku Bobie was voted and elected in the 2020 general election as the Member of Parliament for the constituency form the New Patriotic Party (NPP). Winning the election with a total of 34,684 votes (52.21%) of the total votes cast beating his rival Mohammed Haruna of the National Democratic Party (NDC). The constituency is seen as one of the stronghold for the New Patroitic Party where they have won the last five general election held in the country.

However, in the 2024 Ghanaian general election, Mohammed Haruna of the National Democratic Congress (Ghana) won the elections with 34,083 votes beating New Patriotic Party's Evans Bobie Opoku who polled 25,101 votes.

== Members of Parliament ==
| First elected | Member | Party |
|---|---|---|
| 1992 | David Kwasi Amankwah | National Democratic Congress |
| 2000 | Benjamin Osei Kuffour | New Patriotic Party |
| 2004 | Robert Sarfo-Mensah | New Patriotic Party |
| 2016 | Evans Bobie Opoku | New Patriotic Party |
| 2024 | Mohammed Haruna | National Democratic Congress |

== Boundaries ==
The Asunafo North constituency was one of the constituencies created prior to the 1992 Ghanaian parliamentary election. This constituency was originally located in the Brong-Ahafo Region, now in the Ahafo Region of Ghana. It shares boundary with Asunafo South (Ghana parliament constituency) on the south-eastern borders, Asutifi South (Ghana parliament constituency) in the north east, Dormaa Central (Ghana parliament constituency) on the north west and Juabeso (Ghana parliament constituency) and Sefwi-Wiawso (Ghana parliament constituency) in the Western North Region on the west-south borders.

== See also ==
- List of Ghana Parliament constituencies
