= Ursula Owusu =

Ghanaian lawyer and politician

Ursula Owusu-Ekuful
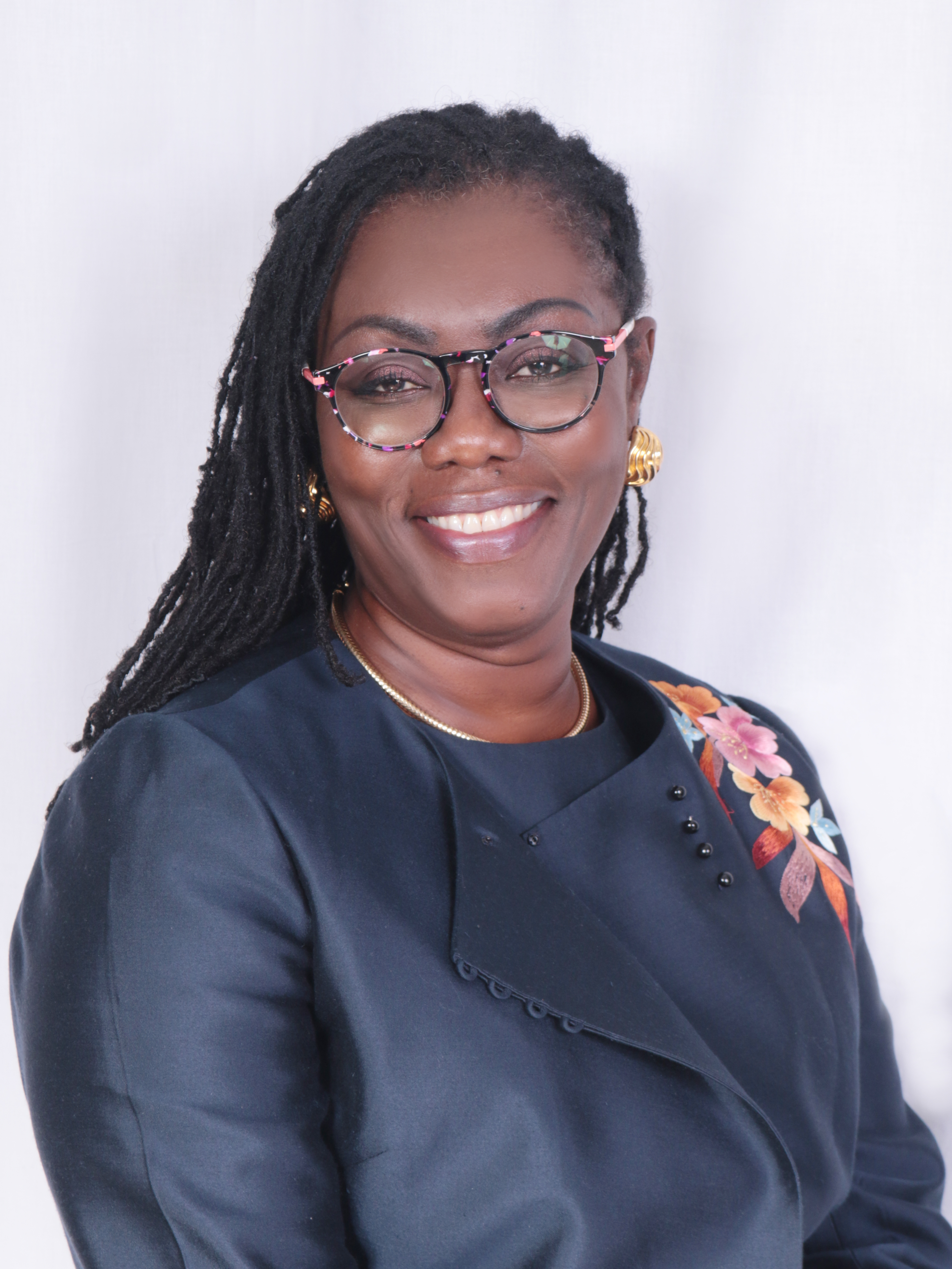

Member of the Ghana Parliament for Ablekuma West constituency
- In office 7 January 2013 – 7 January 2025
- Preceded by: new constituency
- Succeeded by: Ebenezer Kwaku Addo

Minister for Communications
- In office February 2017 – January 2025
- President: Nana Akufo-Addo
- Preceded by: Edward Omane Boamah
- Succeeded by: Sam Nartey George

Personal details
- Born: 20 October 1964 (age 62) Akim Oda, Ghana
- Party: New Patriotic Party
- Spouse: Dr. Sam Ekuful
- Children: 3
- Education: University of Ghana; Labone Senior High School; Mfantsiman Girls' Secondary School
- Occupation: Parliamentarian
- Profession: Lawyer
- Cabinet: Minister
- Website: https://ursulaowusu.com.gh/

Ursula Owusu-Ekuful (born 20 October 1964) is a Ghanaian lawyer, women's rights activist, and a politician who has been actively involved in politics and public service. She is the former member of Parliament for Ablekuma West Constituency in the Greater Accra Region and former Minister of Communications and Digitalisation.

== Early life and education ==
Ursula hails from Akim Oda in the Eastern Region of Ghana. She attended Labone Senior High School and proceeded to Mfantsiman Girls Secondary School for sixth-form education. She continued to the University of Ghana and the Ghana School of Law, where she obtained an LL.B.. She was called to the bar in 1990. She obtained a master's degree in Conflict, Peace, and Security from the Kofi Annan International Peacekeeping Training Centre. She also has a certificate in Government Integrity from the International Law Institute. She also holds a Project Management and Planning Certificate from GIMPA.

== Career ==
She worked for 10 years as a lawyer at the Akufo-Addo, Prempeh & Co. law firm before moving into the telecommunication industry to lead a telecom technology company.

In June 2024, she made an address at the launch of the Ms. Geek Ghana Competition which aims at empowering young women in the field of ICT.

The former communications minister, Ursula-Ekuful, shared that she turned down a spot at Yale University to get married. She was torn between pursuing her education and marrying the man she loved but ultimately chose marriage. Ursula expressed that she doesn’t regret her decision, saying it was a crossroads moment that shaped her future. She’s now happily married to Dr. Sam Ekuful, a senior consultant and owner of Ekuful Eyecare.

Speaking at the 2023 International Women’s Day organized by eTranzact Ghana Ltd., Ursula spoke out about the pressure single women face in Ghana, saying they’re often seen as unwhole without a man. She highlighted the societal stigma attached to being single, emphasizing it's unfair to judge women’s worth based on their marital status.

== Politics ==
In 2012, Ursula Owusu-Ekuful was elected as the first Member of Parliament for the newly created Ablekuma West Constituency.

In 2015, she contested and won the NPP parliamentary primaries in the Ablekuma West Constituency. She proceeded to retain her parliamentary seat during the 2016 Ghanaian general elections by winning with 34,376 votes out of the 60,558 valid votes cast, making 56.96%. Ursula Owusu-Ekuful and other female MPs were subjected to vitriolic attacks following a dispute over places reserved for female members of parliament. She was reported as saying that she was considering her future in politics but in 2017, she was appointed the Minister of Communications and digitalization by President Akufo-Addo.

In December 2020, she contested the re-election as a member of Parliament. Going into the election as the incumbent Member of Parliament of the Ablekuma West (Ghana Parliament) constituency, she retained her seat after polling 37,363 out of 69,353 votes. Her closest competitor, Rev. Kweku Addo of the National Democratic Congress (NDC), was second with 30,733 votes, while the other candidates who contested from the other parties, GUM, LPG, and PNC, polled 359, 330, and 65, respectively.

=== Parliamentary Committees ===
Ursula Owusu-Ekuful is currently serving on the following parliamentary committees:

1. Constitutional, Legal and Parliamentary Affairs Committee (7th Parliament)
2. Appointments Committee (7th Parliament)

== Socio-politics ==
In 2015, she and other women MPs were subject to personal attacks after there was a dispute over places reserved for women members of parliament. She was reported as saying that she was considering her future in politics, but the following year, she became the minister of communications. Before her current position as the minister of communication, she served on different boards and in different capacities in her professional career.

In April 2018, she suffered a backlash from a section of the Ghanaian community when she made headlines for sharing a post on social media that suggested Ghanaian Muslims were intolerant. On Saturday, the 29th day of September 2018, she was installed as the Nkosuohemaa (Development Queen) by the traditional leaders and the people of Akem Asuom in the Eastern Region of Ghana. The installment took place at the Palace of Asuomhene, Osabarima Ofosuhene Apenteng II.

=== Anti-LGBT+ Bill ===
In 2021, when the Ghanaian anti-LGBT bill was proposed, she criticized components of the bill as incentives to promote laziness and dishonesty, so the bill will have to be revised. She also, in May 2021, advised LGBT+ individuals in Ghana to keep their activities private as Ghanaians were unable to accept same-sex relations.

In July 2023, during the second reading of the Promotion of Proper Human Sexual Rights and Ghanaian Family Values Bill 2021, also known as the Ghanaian anti-LGBT bill, in parliament, she had a rebuttal with Hon. Murtala Mohammed when he made claims of her being an LGBTQ+ individual. During that same delivery, she reiterated the existence of LGBT+ individuals in the Ghanaian community and families. She further went on to speak on the need to have laws that protected and respected the rights of every Ghanaian.

=== Kelni GVG contract ===
In June 2024, Franklin Cudjoe accused Owusu-Ekuful of paying $1.5 million to Kelni GVG for no work since 2018 after the National Communications Authority awarded the entity a 10-year contract.

== Personal life ==
Hon. Ursula Owusu-Ekuful, born by Christiana Akua Birago Diawo, is married with three children to the UK-based Ghanaian optometrist, Dr. Sam Ekuful. She is identified as a Christian.

=== Foundation ===
In June 2024, she launched her charity organization, The Ursula Foundation, at Dansoman Sahara, a suburb of Accra in the Greater Accra Region. The aim of the foundation is to serve the people of Ablekuma West and its environs through community development and youth and women empowerment.

== Honours and awards ==
In February 2019 she was honoured by the International Federation of Women Lawyers (FIDA) in recognition of her work in the protection of the rights of women and children at the 2019 FIDA Africa Regional Congress held in Abuja, Nigeria.
