= Nkompo Festival =

Festival in Ghana by the people of Acherensua-Asutifi

Nkompo Festival is an annual festival celebrated by the chiefs and peoples of Acherensua-Asutifi in the Ahafo region, formerly Brong Ahafo Region of Ghana. It is usually celebrated in the month of January. Others also claim it is celebrated in September.

== Celebrations ==
During the festival, visitors are welcomed to share food and drinks. The people put on traditional clothes and there is durbar of chiefs. There is also dancing and drumming.

== Significance ==
This festival is celebrated to mark an event that took place in the past.
