= Tutuka (Ahafo Region) =

Farming community in Ahafo Region, Ghana

- Town
- Location of Tutuka in Ahafo Region, Ghana Tutuka (Africa)
- Coordinates: 7.02°N 2.23°W
- Country: Ghana
- Region: Ahafo Region
- Metropolitan: Asutifi North District
- Time zone: GMT
  - Summer (DST): GMT

Tutuka is farming community near Kenyase Number 2 in the Asutifi North District of the Ahafo Region of Ghana. As at 2023, the Odikuro of the town is Nana Kyei Bonsu Ampemansan.
