= Ablekuma West =

Constituency in Ghana

- constituency for the Parliament of Ghana
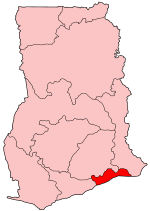
- District: Accra Metropolis District
- Region: Greater Accra Region of Ghana

Current constituency
- Created: 2012
- Party: National Democratic Congress (Ghana)
- MP: Ebenezer Kwaku Addo

Ablekuma West is one of the 276 constituencies represented in the Parliament of Ghana. It elects one Member of Parliament (MP) by the first past the post system of election. Ablekuma West is located in the Accra Metropolis in the Greater Accra Region of Ghana. The member elected at the 2024 general election is Ebenezer Kwaku Addo of the National Democratic Congress (NDC).

== History and boundaries ==
Ablekuma West was one of 45 newly created constituencies for the 2012 general election. It covers the districts of Dansoman, Sahara, Gbegbeyise, Agege, Glefe, Opetekwe and Shiabu. Before the 2016 general election, incumbent MP Ursula Owusu was challenged in an NPP primary election by constituency chairman Theophilus Tettey Enyo and businessman Roni Nicole. The primary proved controversial, with disputes over voting registers used resulting in legal challenges by party members and Enyo's withdrawal. Owusu beat Nicole by 554 votes to 317, with up to 400 members reported to have boycotted the contest in protest.

== Members of Parliament ==
First elected	Member	Party
2012 Ghanaian general election	Ursula Owusu	New Patriotic Party
2016 Ghanaian general election	Ursula Owusu	New Patriotic Party
2020 Ghanaian general election	Ursula Owusu	New Patriotic Party
2024 Ghanaian general election	Ebenezer Kwaku Addo	National Democratic Congress (Ghana)

== Elections ==
Ursula Owusu had been the Member of Parliament for Ablekuma West since the constituency was created in 2012. Following the 2020 election, she declared that she would not lose the seat until death. At the following election in 2024, she lost the seat to the runner up from the National Democratic Congress (NDC) candidate in the 2020 election.

2024 Ghanaian general election: Ablekuma West
Party	Candidate	Votes	%	±%
NDC	Ebenezer Kwaku Addo	31,866	54.53	+9.40
NPP	Ursula Gifty Owusu-Ekuful	26,575	45.47	−9.40
Majority		5,291	9.06	−0.68
Turnout		—	—	—
Registered electors		—		—

2020 Ghanaian general election: Ablekuma West
Party	Candidate	Votes	%	±%
NPP	Ursula Gifty Owusu-Ekuful	37,363	54.87	—
NDC	Ebenezer Kwaku Addo	30,733	45.13	—
Liberal Party of Ghana	Esther Dickson	0	0.00	—
People's National Convention	Daniel Osekine Noye	0	0.00	—
Ghana Union Movement	Henry Antwi	0	0.00	—
Majority		6,630	9.74	—
Turnout		—	—	—
Registered electors		—		—

2016 Ghanaian general election: Ablekuma West
Party	Candidate	Votes	%	±%
NPP	Ursula Gifty Owusu-Ekuful	32,964	56.82	—
NDC	Diana Obenewaa Twum	20,240	34.89	—
Independent	Theophilus Nii Ayerkwei Tettey	4,327	7.46	—
PPP	Charlotte Kumea Korang	443	0.76	—
People's National Convention	Daniel O. Noye	45	0.08	—
Majority		—	—	—
Turnout		—	—	—
Registered electors		—		—

2012 Ghanaian parliamentary election: Source:pulse.com.gh
Party	Candidate	Votes	%	±%
New Patriotic Party	Ursula Owusu	36,975	58.22	
National Democratic Congress	Victoria Hamah	26,153	41.18	
Progressive People's Party	Perry Senyo	291	0.46	
People's National Convention	Daniel Noye	55	0.09	
National Democratic Party	Magnus Asiamah Bekoe	40	0.06	
Majority		10,822	17.04	
Turnout		—	—	—
Registered electors				
