= Mohammed Haruna =

Ghanaian politician

Hon. Mohammed Haruna

Member of the Ghana Parliament for Asunafo North Constituency
- Incumbent
- Assumed office 7 January 2025
- Preceded by: Evans Bobie Opoku
- President: John Mahama
- Vice President: Jane Naana Opoku-Agyemang

Personal details
- Party: National Democratic Congress
- Profession: Politician

Mohammed Haruna (born 6 September 1986) is a Ghanaian politician and Member of Parliament for the Asunafo North Constituency in the Ahafo Region. He represents the constituency in the 9th Parliament of the Fourth Republic of Ghana as a member of the National Democratic Congress (NDC).

== Early life and education ==
Mohammed Haruna attended Anglican Senior High School in Kumasi, where he obtained his S.S.S.C.E. in 2004. He later earned a Bachelor of Science degree in marketing from the University of Professional Studies, Accra, in 2009. In 2016, he completed a Commonwealth Executive Master of Business Administration (CEMBA) program at the Kwame Nkrumah University of Science and Technology.

== Career ==
Mohammed Haruna is a member of the National Democratic Congress (NDC) and currently the Member of Parliament for the Asunafo North Constituency in the Ahafo region. Before entering Parliament, Haruna served as a district director and later as a Regional Director at the National Youth Authority in Ghana.

In 2024, Mohammed Haruna secured 34,083 votes to defeat Evans Bobie Opoku, the incumbent Member of Parliament for the New Patriotic Party (NPP) and Deputy Minister for Youth and Sports, who obtained 25,101 votes.

=== Parliamentary Committees ===
In Parliament, he serves as a member of the Works and Housing Committee and the Backbenchers' Business Committee.

== See also ==
- Evans Bobie Opoku
- Robert Sarfo-Mensah
