= Ntotroso =

- Town
- Location of Ntotroso in Ghana
- Coordinates: 7°03′53″N 2°19′11″W
- Country: Ghana
- Region: Ahafo Region
- District: Asutifi North District
- Time zone: GMT
  - Summer (DST): GMT

Ntotroso is a town in the Asutifi North District in the Ahafo Region of Ghana. The distance from Ntotroso to Kenyasi, the district capital is 13 km while that of Sunyani, the Bono regional capital is 41 km. Notable tertiary institution in this town, is the Ntotroso Nursing College.

== Economy ==
Agricultural farming is the main occupation in Ntotroso. The major cash crops grown in this area are cocoa and Rice. Foodstuffs grown in this area are: Cocoyam, Yam, Plantain, Cassava. Since 2007 when Newmont Ghana established their Ahafo mine, a lot of working population are employed in the mining firm.

== Festival ==
The chiefs and people of Ntotroso celebrate the Apomasu Festival. This festival draws both local people and the diaspora.
