= Asutifi South (district) =

District in Ahafo Region, Ghana

Asutifi South District
- District
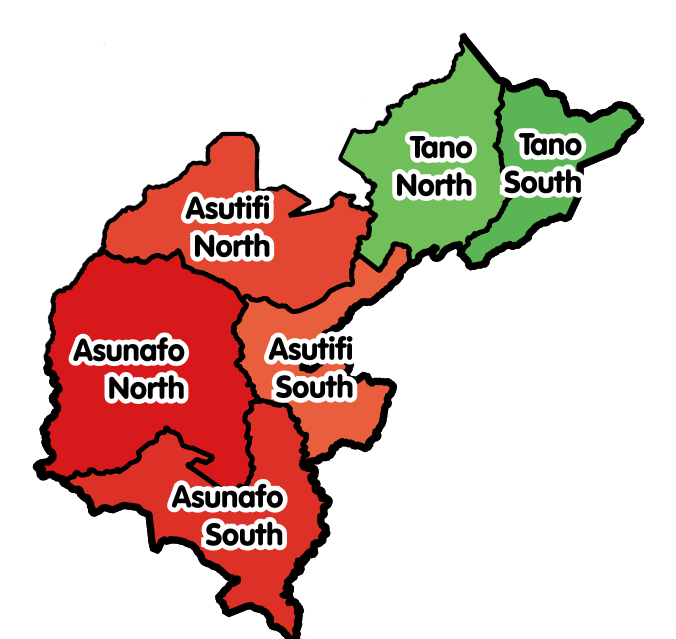
- Map showing the districts of the Ahafo Region of Ghana including Asutifi South.

- Location of Asutifi South District within Ahafo Region
- Coordinates: 6°56′N 2°22′W
- Country: Ghana
- Region: Brong-Ahafo
- Capital: Hwidiem

Population (2021 Census)
  - Total: 68,394
- Time zone: UTC+0 (GMT)

Asutifi South District is one of the six districts in Ahafo Region, Ghana. Originally, it was part of the then-larger Asutifi District since 1988 until the southern part of the district was split off to create Asutifi South District on 28 June 2012; thus the remaining part been renamed as Asutifi North District. The district assembly is located in the eastern part of Ahafo Region and has Hwidiem as its capital town.
