= Apomasu Festival =

Festival in Ghana by the people of Ntotoroso

Apomasu (Yam) Festival is an annual harvest festival celebrated by the chiefs and peoples of Ntotoroso-Asutifi in the Ahafo Region, formerly part of Brong Ahafo region of Ghana. It is usually celebrated in the month of January.

== Celebrations ==
During the festival, visitors are welcomed to share food and drinks. The people put on traditional clothes and there is durbar of chiefs. There is also dancing and drumming.

== Significance ==
This festival is commemorated for more than 900years and it is used to pay homage to the Apomasu shrine and it is claimed it has people coming far and near to seek favor.
