= Francis Adu-Poku =

Ghanaian politician

Mp for Asunafo South Constituency
- In office 7 January 1993 – 6 January 2001
- President: Jerry John Rawlings
- Parliamentary group: National Democratic Congress

Personal details
- Born: 21 May 1959 (age 67)
- Education: Kwame Nkrumah University of Science and Technology
- Occupation: Sociologist

Francis Adu-Poku is a Ghanaian Politician and was a member of the 2nd Parliament of the 4th Republic of Ghana representing Asunafo South Constituency under the membership of the National Democratic Congress (NDC).

== Early life ==
Francis was born on 21 May 1959 in the Brong Ahafo Region of Ghana. He obtained his Bachelor of Arts degree in Sociology and Geography from Kwame Nkrumah University of Science and Technology. He worked as a sociologist before going into politics.

== Political career ==
Francis began his political journey on 7 January 1993 after he was pronounced winner at the 1992 Ghanaian parliamentary election held on 29 December 1992.

He was then reelected into the 2nd parliament of the 4th republic of Ghana after he emerged winner at the 1996 Ghanaian General Elections. He defeated Emmanuel Osei Kuffour of the New Patriotic Party and Yaw Ohene Manu of the National Independence Party. He claimed 42.90% of the total votes cast while his opposition claimed 20.80% and 10.60% respectively. He was defeated by George William Amponsah of the New Patriotic Party at the 2000 Ghanaian General Elections.
