= Adikanfo Festival =

Festival in Ghana by the people of Hwidiem

Adikanfo Festival is an annual festival celebrated by the chiefs and people of Hwidiem in the Ahafo Region, formerly Brong Ahafo region of Ghana. It is usually celebrated in the month of September. Others also claim it is celebrated in the months of March or April.

== Celebrations ==
During the festival, visitors are welcomed to share food and drinks. The people put on traditional clothes and there is durbar of chiefs. There is also dancing and drumming. Sacrifices of animals are made to their gods and ancestors.

== Significance ==
This festival is celebrated to mark an event that took place in the past. This festival commemorates the migration of the people of Hwidiem from Denkyira Ntomu to their present abode.
