= Cecilia Gyan Amoah =

Ghanaian politician

Member of the Ghana Parliament for Asutifi South
- In office 7 January 2001 – 7 January 2005
- Preceded by: Collins Dauda
- Succeeded by: Collins Dauda

Personal details
- Born: 26 October 1947
- Died: 12 January 2023 (aged 75)
- Party: New Patriotic Party
- Spouse: Dr. Philip Kofi Adjapong Amoah (deceased)
- Children: 3
- Profession: Teacher, politician

Cecilia Gyan Amoah (26 October 1947 – 12 January 2023) was a Ghanaian educator, diplomat and politician who represented the Asutifi South Constituency in the Parliament of Ghana from 2001 to 2005.

== Politics ==
She won the Asutifi South Constituency during the 2000 parliamentary elections on the ticket of the New Patriotic Party (NPP), defeating incumbent Collins Dauda of the National Democratic Congress.

Amoah was the member of parliament for the Asutifi South Constituency from January 2001 to January 2005. This was following the death of her husband in 2000, who had previously stood for the party in that constituency. She left the ticket after a loss in the primary for the party in late 2004 to Thomas Broni, deputy Minister for the Interior. She was the first female MP of the NPP to be voted off a ticket.

She also served as Ghana's ambassador to Cuba, becoming High Commissioner to Barbados afterwards. On 13 June 2015, Amoah won the Asutifi South constituency New Patriotic Party parliamentary primaries to represent the party again in the Ghanaian general election in 2016. However, one member of her late husband's family (a distant cousin) did not support her attempt to return, calling the incumbent Collins Dauda "dangerous". Amoah had accused her electoral opponent Collins Dauda and his political party of using intimidation tactics after claiming they sent men to assault NPP polling agents. Amoah and several others were later attacked by unknown assailants, who destroyed several bicycles in their care.

=== 2000 Elections ===
Amoah was elected as the member of parliament for the Asutifi South constituency in the 2000 Ghanaian general elections. She was elected on the ticket of the New Patriotic Party. Her constituency was a part of the 14 parliamentary seats out of 21 seats won by the New Patriotic Party in that election for the Brong Ahafo Region. The New Patriotic Party won a majority total of 100 parliamentary seats out of 200 seats in the 3rd parliament of the 4th republic of Ghana. She was elected with 8,220 votes out of 16,089 total valid votes cast. This was equivalent to 51.6% of the total valid votes cast. She was elected over Collins Dauda of the National Democratic Congress, Alfred Osei Nkrumah of the National Reform Party, Alex Osei Amankwaa of the Convention People's Party, and Kwabena Yeboah of the People's National Convention. These obtained 14,326, 359, 245, 207 and 200 votes respectively out of the total valid votes cast. These were equivalent to 57.5%, 39.7%, 1.0%, 0.7%, 0.6% and 0.6% respectively of total valid votes cast.

Amoah died on 12 January 2023 (aged 75) in Accra, Ghana.
