= George Boakye (politician) =

Ghanaian politician and educationist

Hon. George Boakye

Member of the Ghana Parliament for Asunafo South Constituency
- In office 7 January 2005 – 6 January 2013
- Preceded by: New constituency
- Succeeded by: Eric Opoku

Personal details
- Born: 6 October 1956 (age 69) Sankore
- Party: New Patriotic Party
- Education: KNUST
- Occupation: Teacher

George Boakye is a Ghanaian politician who served as the member of parliament for the Asunafo South Constituency. He is currently the Regional Minister for Ahafo region.

== Early life and education ==
He was born on 6 October 1956. He hails from Sankore a town in the Brong Ahafo Region of Ghana. He obtained his Bachelor of Arts degree in Social Science from the Kwame Nkrumah University of Science and Technology in 1992. He further had his Master of Education degree in Educational Planning and Administration from the University of Cape Coast in 2001.

== Career ==
He is an Educationist. He worked as the Vice Principal of St. Joseph's Training College at Bechem prior to his joining politics.

== Politics ==
He is member of the New Patriotic Party. He was the District Chief Executive of Asunafo South District. He became member of the parliament representing Asunafo South Constituency in the Brong Ahafo region of Ghana in the January 2009 after winning his poll in the 2008 Ghanaian General Elections with 16,574 votes out of 32,953 valid votes. He was succeeded in office by Eric Opoku of the NDC.

== Personal life ==
He is married with six children. He identifies as a Christian and a member of the Catholic Church.

== Controversy ==
In April 2017, the British High Commission in Ghana allegedly accused Boakye, Johnson Kwaku Adu, Richard Acheampong, and Joseph Benhazin Dahah of helping their relatives enter the UK illegally using their diplomatic passports. Boakye applied for visas for himself and his daughter and later left her in the UK who stayed for 3 years before returning to Ghana.
