= Eric Opoku (politician) =

Ghanaian politician

The Honourable Eric Opoku MP
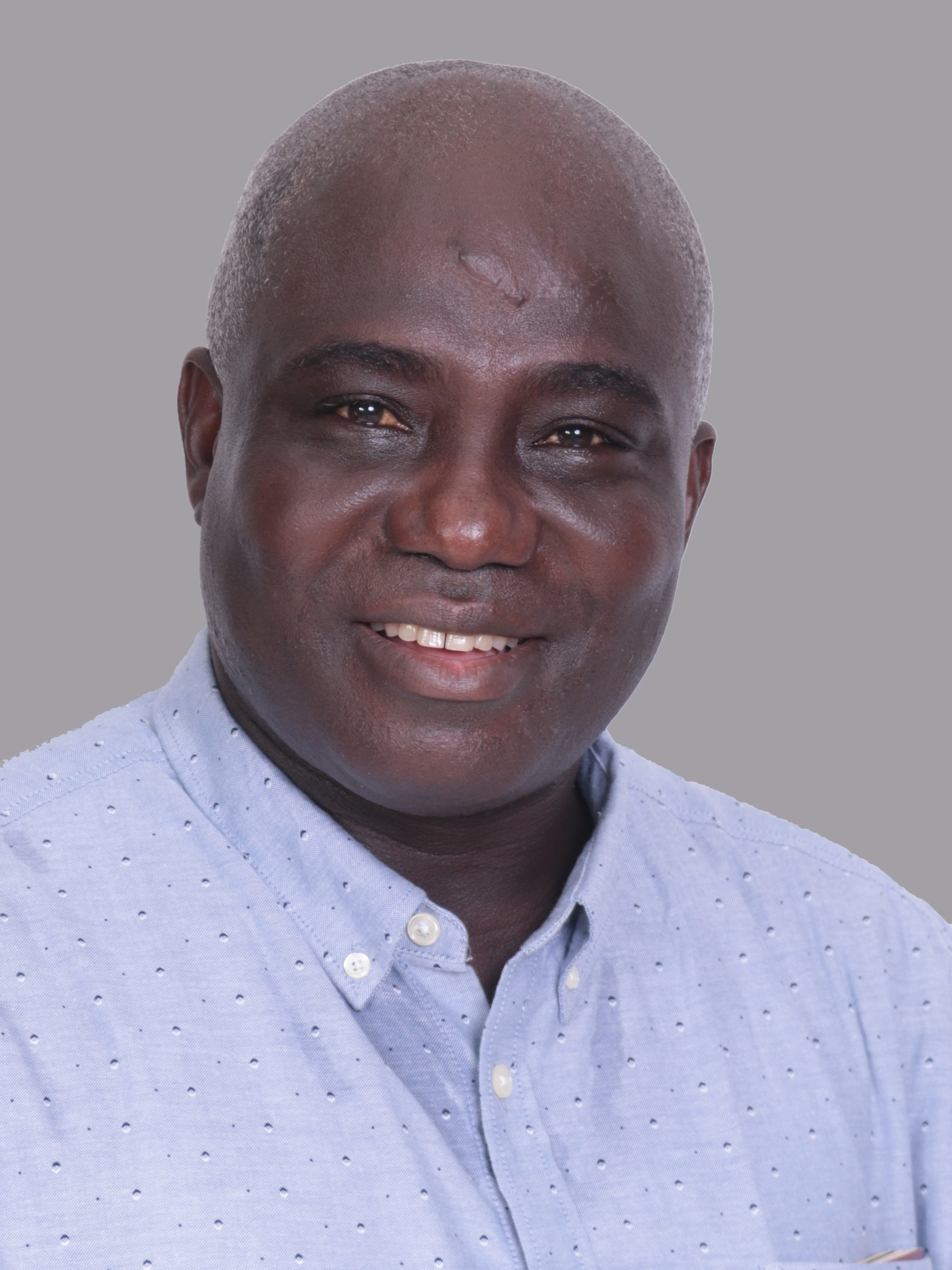

Member of the Ghana Parliament for Asunafo South
- Incumbent
- Assumed office 7 January 2013
- Preceded by: George Boakye
- Majority: 1,395

Minister for Food and Agriculture
- Incumbent
- Assumed office 22 January 2025
- Preceded by: Bryan Acheampong

Brong Ahafo Regional Minister
- In office 16 July 2014 – 6 January 2017
- Preceded by: Paul Evans Aidoo
- Succeeded by: Kweku Asomah-Cheremeh

Ashanti Regional Minister
- In office 11 March 2013 – 16 July 2014
- Preceded by: Samuel Sarpong
- Succeeded by: Samuel Sarpong

Brong Ahafo Regional Minister
- In office 11 March 2012 – 14 February 2013
- Succeeded by: Paul Evans Aidoo
- In office 7 January 2005 – 6 January 2009
- Preceded by: George William Amponsah for Asunafo South
- Succeeded by: George Boakye

Personal details
- Born: 5 June 1970 (age 56)
- Party: National Democratic Congress
- Education: Kwame Nkrumah University of Science and Technology
- Profession: Farmer/Agriculturist
- Committees: Food, Agriculture and Cocoa Affairs Committee, Privileges Committee & Appointments Committee
- Portfolio: Ministry of Food and Agriculture

Eric Opoku (born 5 June 1970) is a Ghanaian politician and member of the 9th parliament of the Fourth Republic of Ghana representing the Asunafo South Constituency in the Ahafo Region on the ticket of the National Democratic Congress. He is currently Ghana's Minister of Food and Agriculture.

== Early life and education ==
Eric Opoku was born on 5 June 1970. He hails from a town called Sankore in the Ahafo region of Ghana. He had his Bachelor of Arts degree in Social Science from Kwame Nkrumah University of Science and Technology in year 2004.

== Career ==
Opoku is a farmer/agriculturist. Prior to winning election and getting into parliament, he worked as a teacher with the Ghana Education Service at Seventh-day Adventist Church (SDA) Primary School in Sankore, from 1997 to 2000. He has also worked with Kuapa Kookoo Ltd as the Society Development Secretary from 1998 to 2001.

== Political career ==
Opoku was first elected into parliament in the 3rd parliament of the 4th republic of Ghana as the member of parliament for the Asunafo South constituency in the Brong Ahafo region of Ghana. Though he lost his seat in the subsequent election, he was elected again into parliament on 7 January 2013 after claiming victory at the 2012 Ghanaian General Elections to represent the Asunafo South constituency and served until 6 January 2017. He was then reelected on 7 January 2017 after the 2016 Ghanaian General Elections where he obtained 52.97% of the valid votes cast.
He has worked as the Deputy Brong Ahafo Regional Minister from 2009 to 2013. In the 7th parliament of the 4th republic of Ghana he served on the Food, Agriculture and Cocoa Affairs Committee as a ranking Member. He also served on the Privileges Committee and Appointments Committee in the same parliament.

In January 2025, President Mahama swore him and others into office as ministers to oversee various ministries. He was appointed as the Minister of Food and Agriculture.

== As Minister of Food and Agriculture ==
Eric Opoku appointed as the Minister of Food and Agriculture and since assuming office started working and putting things right. to advance the agriculture sector

On 9 July 2026 the Minister announced that the government is implementing initiatives as part of the National Democratic Congress (NDC) government's flagship programme called Ghana programme and under the sub-programme known as Feed the Industry.

The programme is designed to increase food production, jobs and sustainable food security. This will be done by linking farmers to agro-processing industries to bridge the gap of farm products not getting to the industries.

The programme as stated by Mr. Opoku, is creating this system for guarantee for both farmers and buyers so that farmers will produce based on industry demand.

The minister has also announced that the government has distributed about 1500 bags of fertilisers to each constituency across the country to support farmers to boost production during this farming season. This was announced during the meeting with the Parliament Assurance Committee on Thursday, 9 July 2026.

To further boost production and quality of produce, the ministry has purchased 506 motorbikes for newly recruited agricultural extension officers to support and improve their work. This will help them reach more farmers across the country.

== Elections ==
Opoku was elected as the member of parliament for the Asunafo South constituency of the Brong Ahafo region in the 2004 Ghanaian general elections. He won on the ticket of the National Democratic Congress. His constituency was a part of the 10 parliamentary seats out of a total 24 seats won by the National Democratic Congress in that election for the Brong Ahafo Region. The Asunafo South constituency saw a ‘skirt and blouse’ vote by electorates in that election as the presidential candidate elected by the constituency electorates was John Kufour of the major opposition New Patriotic Party. The National Democratic Congress won a minority total of 94 parliamentary seats out of 230 seats in those elections. Opoku was elected with 14,076 votes out of 29,345 total valid votes cast, equivalent to 48% of total valid votes cast. He was elected over George William Amponsah of the New Patriotic Party, Jack Kennedy Brobbey an independent candidate, and Fredrick Nkrumah of the Convention People's Party. These obtained 43.80%, 7.30%, and 0.90%, respectively, of total valid votes cast.

Opoku was re-elected in the 2020 Parliamentary election to represent them in the 8th Parliament of the fourth Republic of Ghana. He was re-elected in the 2024 parliamentary election to represent the Asunafo South constituents in the 9th parliament in the fourth republic of Ghana. He gearned 25,244 which represent 5s7.40% of the votes in the election.

== Attack ==
Opoku was attacked in his residence on 25 December 2017 in Sankore in the Brong Ahafo region of Ghana. The National Democratic Congress alleged that the attackers were armed supporters of the opposition New Patriotic Party. He was attacked for the second time, on 1 April 2018, also in his home in Sankore by armed men. Though left unharmed the attackers allegedly made away with about GHS 10,400.00, a television set and decoder and damaged three of Opoku's vehicles.

== Personal life ==
Opoku is a Christian. He is married with four children.

== Awards/Honours ==
Opoku received an award as the best member of parliament for communal and rural development for 2017 from the Bureau of Research on Governance, Commerce, and Administration (BORGCA). This award was given for his contribution to developmental projects in the Asunafo South constituency.
