= Asunafo South (Ghana parliament constituency) =

Constituency in the Ahafo Region of Ghana

- constituency for the Parliament of Ghana
- District: Asunafo South District
- Region: Ahafo Region of Ghana

Current constituency
- Party: National Democratic Congress
- MP: Eric Opoku

Asunafo South is one of the constituencies represented in the Parliament of Ghana. It elects one Member of Parliament (MP) by the first past the post system of election. Eric Opoku is the member of parliament for the constituency. He was elected on the ticket of the National Democratic Congress (NDC). The constituency is located in the Ahafo Region of the Republic of Ghana.

== Member of Parliament ==
First elected	Member	Party
1992	Francis Adu-Poku	National Democratic Congress
2000	George William Amponsah	New Patriotic Party
2004	Eric Opoku	National Democratic Congress
2008	George Boakye	New Patriotic Party
2012	Eric Opoku	National Democratic Congress

== See also ==
- List of Ghana Parliament constituencies
