= OLA Girls Senior High School (Kenyasi) =

Female second cycle institution in Kenyasi, Ghana

Location
- Ahafo Region; Kenyasi; Ghana; 6°59′14″N 2°24′08″W

Information
- School type: All Girls School
- Founder: Catholic Missionary sisters of Our Lady of Apostles
- School district: Asutifi North District
- Oversight: Ministry of Education
- Gender: Girls
- Classes offered: Home Economics, General Science, General Arts, Visual Arts, Business Accounting, Agricultural Science

Ola Girls' Secondary School is first female second cycle institution in Kenyase No. 2 to be established in the Ahafo Region of Ghana.

== History ==
Ola Girls' Secondary School daan maalee in 1973 ayi Catholic Sisters deme s3n, Te pogeba Apostles in collaboration atepaahe neng late Rev James Kwadwo Owusu, and the then Omanhene ofgTraditional Area, Nana Nsiah Ababio. However it officially started on the September 27, 1974 with 34 girls. It was until September, 1976 that it was absorbed into the public school system.

== Achievements ==
Ola Girls’ SHS, Kenyasi placed third in the 6th edition of the Energy Commission’s Renewable Energy Competition. They were defeated by Legon PRESEC who placed first, Ahantaman Girls’ SHS took the second place, Dabokpa Technical Institute taking the fourth position, Adidome SHS taking the fifth position and Damongo SHS who was the sixth.
