= Kenyasi =

Town in Ahafo Region, Ghana

- Location in Ghana
- Coordinates: 6°59′N 2°23′W
- Country: Ghana
- Region: Ahafo Region
- District: Asutifi District

Kenyasi is a town in Ghana and it's the capital of the Asutifi North District in the Ahafo Region. Kenyasi is a combination of two towns: Kenyasi No.1 and Kenyasi No.2. Kenyasi has abundance of Gold resources hence Newmont, Ghana Ahafo mine having their operations in the area since 2007. Kenyasi has direct routes to places such as Mim, Ahafo( 24 km); Hwidiem (5 km); Ntotroso (13 km). Notable secondary educational institution in this town is the OLA Girls Senior High School (Kenyasi).

== Economy ==
Agricultural farming is the main occupation in Kenyasi. The major cash crops grown in this area is cocoa. Plantain, Cassava are among the food crops grown by residents in the area mostly on subsistence basis. Since 2007 when Newmont Ghana established their Ahafo mine, a lot of residents have now been employed in the mining sector. Hood Lyrics Recording Studio, and the Alabama Hotel are some of the businesses which offer employment in Kenyasi.
