= Collins Dauda =

Ghanaian politician

Hon. Collins Dauda MP
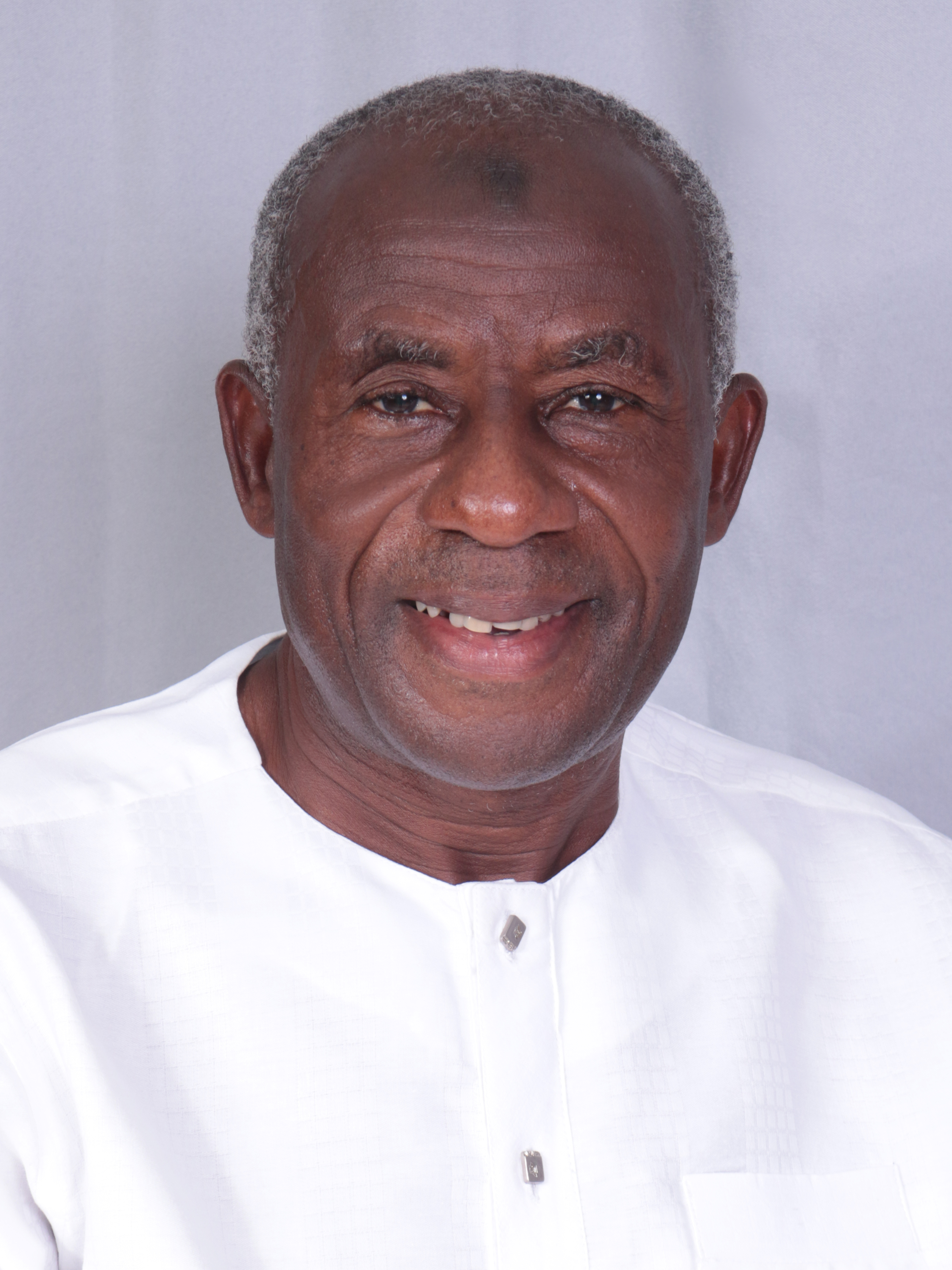

Member of the Ghana Parliament for Asutifi South constituency
- Incumbent
- Assumed office 7 January 2005
- Preceded by: Cecilia Djan Amoah
- In office 7 January 1993 – 7 January 2001
- Preceded by: constituency created
- Succeeded by: Cecilia Djan Amoah

Personal details
- Born: 13 February 1957 (age 69) Mehame
- Party: National Democratic Congress
- Children: 11
- Education: Mim Secondary School
- Profession: Teacher/Business Person
- Cabinet: Minister of State(Lands & National Resources; Transport; Water Resources, Works & Housing & Local Government& Rural Development: 2009-2016)

Alhaji Collins Dauda (born 13 February 1957) is a teacher, politician, former Ghanaian Minister for Lands and Natural Resources; and Water Resources, Works and Housing and member of the Eighth Parliament of the Fourth Republic of Ghana representing Asutifi South Constituency He is from Mahame in the Brong Ahafo Region. Hon Alhaji Collins Dauda attended Mim Secondary School from 1973 to 1981 where he obtained his general certificate of Education ordinary and advanced levels.

Between 1985 and 1986 he was a teacher at Kukuom Agric Secondary School. He later joined Ahafoman Secondary School 1986 and became the assembly member in 1991 to 1992.

== Early life and education ==
Collins Dauda was born on 13 February 1957 in Mehame in the Ahafo region (formerly, Brong Ahafo Region). His parents were Issaka Naaba and Mariama Issah. His secondary education was at Mim Senior High School where he obtained both the GCE Ordinary Level and the GCE Advanced Level between 1973 and 1981. He obtained his higher schools certificate from Navrongo Secondary School in 1981

== Career ==
Dauda taught at the Kukuom Agricultural Senior High School from 1985. In 1986, he joined the teaching staff at the Ahafoman Senior High School where he continued to teach until 1992. In addition to serving as a member of the Consultative Assembly, he worked for the Asutifi District Assembly. In the Fourth Republic, he served as the Asutifi South representative to parliament. Prior to being moved to the Ministry of Water Resources, Works, and Housing, he served as the Minister for Lands and Mineral Resources in February 2009.

== Politics ==
Dauda became a member of the Asutifi District Assembly between 1978 and 1981. He was a member of the Consultative Assembly, that drew up the 1992 Ghana constitution between 1991 and 1992. He was first elected to parliament in the 1992 parliamentary election on the ticket of the National Democratic Congress making him the first MP for the Asutifi South constituency in the Fourth Republic. He won a second term in the 1996 parliamentary election. He however lost his seat in 2000 parliamentary election due to an allegation that he'd used black magic to kill his political rival Prof. Gyan-Amoah just a day before the general elections. He however regained the seat in 2004. He has maintained the seat from the 4th to the 7th parliament of the 4th republic. During 2002 and 2004 when he was out of parliament, he was the Regional Chairman of the National Democratic Congress (NDC) in the Brong Ahafo Region. From February 2009 to 2016, Collins Dauda was appointed Minister for Lands and Mineral Resources and reshuffled to the Ministry of Water Resources, Works and Housing. He was also the Vice president of the committee on Lands and Forestry between 1994 and 1996. He later became chairman of the same committee between 1997 and 2000 and also served as member of the Finance and Youth, Sports and Culture Committees.

On 3 November 2025 was accused of inciting an attack on members National Anti-Illegal Mining Operations Secretariat (NAIMOS) by youth in Hwidiem though he has denied the allegation.

However, the Speaker of Parliament, Alban Sumana Kingsford Bagbin, assured the public that that neither his office nor Parliament will shield any member of Parliament (MP) from being investigated by law enforcement agencies for their actions and inactions.

=== Elections ===
Dauda was elected for the 3rd time as the member of parliament for the Asutifi South constituency of the Brong Ahafo Region in the 2004 Ghanaian general elections. He thus represented the constituency in the 4th parliament of the 4th republic of Ghana. He won on the ticket of the National Democratic Congress. His constituency was a part of the 10 parliamentary seats out of 24 seats won by the National Democratic Congress in that election for the Brong Ahafo Region. The Asutifi South constituency saw a ‘skirt and blouse’ voting by electorates in that election as the presidential candidate elected by the constituency electorates was John Kufour of the major opposition New Patriotic Party. The National Democratic Congress won a minority total of 94 parliamentary seats out of 230 seats. Dauda was elected with 9,668 votes out of 18700 total valid votes cast, equivalent to 51.70% of total valid votes cast. He was elected over Thomas Broni of the New Patriotic Party, Nana Nsiah Ababio Williams Cosmus of the People's National Convention and Adu Adjei Augustine of the Convention People's Party. These obtained 46.90%, 1.20% and 0.30% respectively of total valid votes cast.

In the 2008 Ghanaian general elections, Dauda was elected for the 4th time as the member of parliament for the Asutifi South constituency. He continued to represent the constituency in the 5th parliament of the 4th republic of Ghana. He won on the ticket of the National Democratic Congress. His constituency was part of the majority total of 114 parliamentary seats out of 230 seats in that election. Dauda was elected with 10,984 votes out of 22,032 total valid votes cast, equivalent to 49.85% of total valid votes cast. He was elected over Yiadom Boakye of the New Patriotic Party and Okyere George of the Democratic People's Party. These obtained 49.79% and 0.35% of total valid votes cast respectively. He was re-elected by his constituents in the 2020 General election, to represent them in the 8th Parliament of the Fourth Republic of Ghana.

=== Committees ===
Dauda is a member of the Finance committee, also a member of the Lands and Forestry Committee and also a member of Committee of Selection Committee.

=== Ethnocentric comment ===
In August 2016, Dauda in addressing party supporters at Koforidua said that the then opposition New Patriotic Party had a long history of discriminating against Zongo people and that "We should let them know that we are not with them".

In May 2024, Dauda was arrested for allegedly being involved in a limited Voter registration exercise violence in his constituency.

On Saturday May 11, 2024, the National Democratic Congress (NDC) responded to the arrest of Member of Parliament Collins Dauda by the Ghana Police Service, citing his alleged involvement in disturbances at a voter registration center. The NDC claimed that the violence was perpetrated by New Patriotic Party (NPP) thugs, resulting in injuries to NDC members. They asserted Dauda's absence from the scene and criticized the police for rushing to make arrests without sufficient evidence. The NDC reaffirmed its commitment to peaceful participation in the voter registration process but condemned the police's perceived bias and called for impartiality in maintaining law and order.Collins Dauda committed no crime, police allegations palpably false - NDC

=== Limited voting registration exercise ===
According to a police statement on May 11, 2024, the National Democratic Congress (NDC) MP was arrested in connection with a disturbance during the limited voter registration exercise at Kukuom in the Ahafo Region, where one person was injured and hospitalized. However, his party refuted his involvement in the disturbance and subsequently granted him bail on May 13, 2024.

== Prosecution ==
Collins Dauda was prosecuted by Nana Addo's government to the chargers of 70 charges, including causing financial loss to the state, related to the controversy over the $200 million Saglemi Affordable Housing Project he supervised during his tenure as the minister of Works and Housing.It was alleged that Collins Dauda, Kweku Agyeman-Mensah, and Alhaji Ziblim Yakubu played key roles in the project's planning and execution.

However, on February 5, 2025, the Attorney-General and Minister of Justice, Dr. Dominic Ayine, withdrawn all charges against him and the four others who were involved in the Saglemi Housing Project case.

== Personal life ==
Dauda is married with two wives and eleven children.

== See also ==
- List of Mills government ministers
- Asutifi South (Ghana parliament constituency)

Parliament of Ghana
Preceded by	Asutifi South; 1993 –2001	Succeeded by Cecilia Djan Amoah
Preceded by Cecilia Djan Amoah	Asutifi South; 2005 – present	Incumbent
Political offices
Preceded by Esther Obeng Dapaah; Minister for Lands, Forestry and Mines	Minister for Lands and Natural Resources; 2009 – 2017	Incumbent
