= David Kwasi Amankwah =

Ghanaian politician

Hon. David Kwasi Amankwah

Member of Parliament for Asunafo North
- In office 7 January 1993 – 6 January 2001
- President: Jerry John Rawlings
- Preceded by: New constituency
- Succeeded by: Benjamin Osei Kuffour

Personal details
- Party: National Democratic Congress
- Profession: Politician, teacher

David Kwasi Amankwah is a Ghanaian politician. He was the member of the Parliament that represented Asunafo North Constituency of the Brong Ahafo region in the Parliament of Ghana.

== Early life and education ==
Amankwah was born on 16 June 1943 and he hails from the Brong-Ahafo Region of Ghana. He had his tertiary education at the University of Cape Coast in the Central Region. He has a Bachelor of Science degree in education.

== Occupation ==
Kwasi Amankwah is a teacher as well as a politician.

== Political career ==
He was elected into the 1st parliament of the 4th republic of Ghana on 7 January 1993 after he emerged winner at the 1992 Ghanaian parliamentary election held on 29 December 1992.

He was then re-elected into parliament during the 1996 Ghanaian general elections. He contested on the ticket of the National Democratic Congress with Osei Benjamin Kuffour of the New Patriotic Party (NPP) and Michael Maham Nabla of the People's National Convention (PNC). Kwasi Amankwah emerged as winner with 20,326 votes of the valid votes cast. Benjamin Osei Kuffour of the NPP was the 1st runner up with 17,048 votes while PNC's candidate Michael Maham Nabla came third place with a total votes of 618 votes. These represent 41.80%, 35.10% and 1.30% respectively. Kwasi Amankwah represented the Asunafo North Constituency in the Brong Ahafo region and was replaced by Benjamin Osei Kuffour of the NPP in the 2000 Ghanaian General elections.
