= Asutifi North (Ghana parliament constituency) =

Constituency in the Ahafo Region of Ghana

- constituency for the Parliament of Ghana
- District: Asutifi North (district)
- Region: Ahafo Region of Ghana

Current constituency
- Party: National Democratic Congress
- MP: Ebenezer Kwaku Addo

Asutifi North is one of the constituencies represented in the Parliament of Ghana. It elects one Member of Parliament (MP) by the first past the post system of election. Ebenezer Kwaku Addo is the member of parliament for the constituency. He was elected on the ticket of the National Democratic Congress and won a majority of 18,584 votes.

== Member of Parliament ==
First Elect	Member	Party
2012	Benhazin Joseph Dahah	New Patriotic Party
2016	Benhazin Joseph Dahah	New Patriotic Party
2020	Patrick Banor	New Patriotic Party
2024	Ebenezer Kwaku Addo	National Democratic Congress

== See also ==
- List of Ghana Parliament constituencies
