= Hwidiem =

Hwidiem in the Brong Ahafo Region
- Town
- Location within Ghana
- Coordinates: 6°56′N 2°22′W
- Country: Ghana
- Region: Ahafo Region
- District: Asutifi District
- Elevation: 696 ft (212 m)
- Time zone: GMT
  - Summer (DST): GMT

Hwidiem is a town in the Asutifi district, a district in the Ahafo Region of Ghana.

== Education ==
Hwidiem is known for the Hwidiem Secondary School. The school is a second cycle institution.

== Healthcare ==
The St. Elizabeth Hospital is located in Hwidiem.

== See also ==
- Asutifi North (Ghana parliament constituency)
- Asutifi South (Ghana parliament constituency)
- Adikanfo Festival
