= Benjamin Osei Kuffour =

Ghanaian politician

Hon. Benjamin Osei Kuffour

Member of the Ghana Parliament for Asunafo North
- In office 7 January 2001 – 6 January 2005
- Preceded by: David Kwasi Amankwah
- Succeeded by: Robert Sarfo-Mensah

Personal details
- Party: New Patriotic Party
- Occupation: Politician

Benjamin Osei Kuffour is a Ghanaian politician and was the member of parliament for the Asunafo North constituency in the Brong Ahafo region of Ghana. He was the member of parliament in the 3rd parliament of the 4th republic of Ghana.

== Politics ==
Kuffour was elected as the member of parliament for the Wenchi East constituency in the 2000 Ghanaian general elections. He was elected on the ticket of the New Patriotic Party. His constituency was a part of the 14 parliamentary seats out of 21 seats won by the New Patriotic Party in that election for the Brong Ahafo Region.

The New Patriotic Party won a majority total of 100 parliamentary seats out of 200 seats in the 3rd parliament of the 4th republic of Ghana. He was elected with 20,784 votes out of 36,814 total valid votes cast. This was equivalent to 57.5% of the total valid votes cast. He was elected over Christiana Atakora Mensah of the National Democratic Congress, Francis Amofah of the Convention People's Party, Michael Mahama Nabila of the People's National Convention, Yeboah Kwasi Eric of the United Ghana Movement and Asare Bediako of the National Reform Party, These obtained 14,326, 359, 245, 207 and 200 votes respectively out of the total valid votes cast. These were equivalent to 57.5%, 39.7%, 1.0%, 0.7%, 0.6% and 0.6% respectively of total valid votes cast.
