= Benhazin Joseph Dahah =

Ghanaian politician

Member of the Ghana Parliament for Asutifi North Constituency

Personal details
- Born: February 8, 1969 (age 57)
- Party: New Patriotic Party

Benhazin Joseph Dahah (born 8 February 1969) is a Ghanaian politician and member of the Seventh Parliament of the Fourth Republic of Ghana representing the Asutifi North Constituency in the Brong-Ahafo Region on the ticket of the New Patriotic Party (NPP).

== Early life and education ==
He was born on 8 February 1969 in the town of Ntotroso in the Brong-Ahafo Region of Ghana. He earned his Bachelor of Arts degree in Integrated Development Studies from University for Development Studies. Prior to his appointment as a member of the parliament, He worked as a Ghana Education Service teacher.

== Political career ==
Dahah was first elected into parliament on 7 January 2013 after contesting and winning in the 2012 Ghanaian general elections. He was then re-elected to represent his constituency for a second term after he contested in the 2016 Ghanaian general elections. He obtained 54.98% of the valid votes cast.

== Personal life ==
Dahah identifies as a Christian and is married with ten children.

== Controversy ==
In April 2017, the British High Commission in Ghana allegedly accused Dahah, George Boakye, Richard Acheampong, and Johnson Kwaku Adu of helping their relatives enter the UK illegally using their diplomatic passports. He applied for a visa and stated he was traveling with his wife and niece but his niece was denied the visa. He later applied in a different country with different names from the initial ones provided to Ireland. His UK visa was cancelled and faced a 10-year ban.
