= Robert Sarfo-Mensah =

Ghanaian politician

Hon. Robert Sarfo-Mensah

Member of the Ghana Parliament for Asunafo North
- In office 7 January 2005 – 6 January 2017
- Preceded by: Benjamin Osei Kuffour
- Succeeded by: Evans Bobie Opoku

Personal details
- Born: 1 April 1970 (age 56)
- Party: New Patriotic Party
- Education: University of Ghana, Ghana Institute of Management and Public Administration
- Occupation: Public Servant (Tax Officer), Farmer

Robert Sarfo-Mensah a Ghanaian politician and member of the Fifth and Sixth Parliament of the Fourth Republic of Ghana representing Asunafo North in the Brong Ahafo region of Ghana.

== Early life and education ==
He was born on 1 April 1970. He hails from Mampong in Ashanti region. He had his Executive Master's at GIMPA in 2008. He also has a Bachelor of Arts degree in English at University of Ghana in 1996.

== Employment ==
Sarfo-Mensah is a farmer/agriculturist. He has worked as an Assistant Revenue Officer of VAT Service. He has thus worked as a Public Servant, specifically Tax Officer. In 2017, he also served as the Director-General of the National Sports Authority of Ghana after his appointment by then president Nana Akuffo Addo. He was, however, suspended from the position by the same president after news of his involvement in a visa scandal in the then ongoing Commonwealth Games in Gold Coast, Australia surfaced. In a Ghanaian investigative journalism expose, named Number 12, Sarfo-Mensah was allegedly caught on tape receiving money from Tiger Eye PI team to facilitate matches by ensuring a player was allowed to play in a football match.

== Politics ==
He became a member of Parliament in 2005. He is a member of New Patriotic Party. He became the member of parliament for the first time in the 4th parliament of the 4th republic of Ghana. He represented the Asunafo North constituency in the Brong Ahafo Region. He maintained his seat as the member of parliament for the Asunafo North constituency for the 5th parliament of the 4th republic of Ghana.

== Elections ==
Sarfo-Mensah was first elected in the 2004 Ghanaian general elections as the member of parliament for the Asunafo North constituency in the former Brong Ahafo region of Ghana. He won on the ticket of the New Patriotic Party. His constituency was part of the 14 parliamentary seats out of 24 seats won by the New Patriotic Party in that election for the Brong Ahafo Region. In that election the New Patriotic Party won a majority total of 128 parliamentary seats out of 230 seats. He was elected with 23,426votes out of 45308 total valid votes cast equivalent to 51.7% of total valid votes cast. He was elected over Christina Atakora Mensah of the National Democratic Congress, Benjamin Osei Kufour an independent candidate and Commey Kingsley of the Convention People's Party. These obtained 42.60%, 4.60% and 1.20% respectively of total valid votes cast.

He was elected again in the 2008 Ghanaian general elections with 24,162 votes out of the 45,642 total valid votes cast, equivalent to 52.9% of total valid votes cast. He was elected over Mohammed Kwaku Doku of the National Democratic Congress, Stephen Keabena of the Democratic People's Party and Seth George Mensah of the Convention People's Party. These obtained 46.16%, 0.30% and 0.60% of total valid votes cast.

== Personal life ==
Robert is married with four children. He is a Christian (Church of Pentecost).
