= Asutifi South (Ghana parliament constituency) =

Constituency in the Ahafo Region of Ghana

- constituency for the Parliament of Ghana
- District: Asutifi District
- Region: Ahafo Region of Ghana

Current constituency
- Party: National Democratic Congress
- MP: Collins Dauda

Asutifi South is one of the constituencies represented in the Parliament of Ghana. It elects one Member of Parliament (MP) by the first past the post system of election. Asutifi South is located in the Asutifi District of the Ahafo Region of Ghana.

== Boundaries ==
The seat is located entirely within the Asutifi district of the Ahafo Region of Ghana.

== Members of Parliament ==
First elected	Member	Party
1992	Collins Dauda	National Democratic Congress
2000	Cecilia Gyan Amoah	New Patriotic Party
2004	Collins Dauda	National Democratic Congress

== Election results ==
2024 Ghanaian general election: Asutifi
Party	Candidate	Votes	%	±%
NDC	Collins Dauda	20,002	55.28	+1.91
NPP	Yaw Owusu Brempong	16,092	44.48	−2.00
NDP	Andrews Kofi Ahiamata	87	0.24	+0.09
Majority		3,910	10.80	—
Turnout		—	—	—
Registered electors		—		

2020 Ghanaian general election: Asutifi
Party	Candidate	Votes	%	±%
NDC	Collins Dauda	20,616	53.37	−3.30
NPP	Yaw Owusu Brempong	17,957	46.48	+3.49
NDP	Seidu Kwame	58	0.15	—
Majority		2,659	6.89	—
Turnout		—	—	—
Registered electors		—		

2016 Ghanaian general election: Asutifi
Party	Candidate	Votes	%	±%
NDC	Collins Dauda	15,855	56.67	—
NPP	Cecilia Gyan Amoah	12,026	42.99	—
People's National Convention (Ghana)	Adu Samuel Kent	51	0.18	—
CPP	Dankwah Kofi Richmond	44	0.16	—
Majority		3,829	14.68	—
Turnout		—	—	—
Registered electors		—		

2012 Ghanaian general election: Asutifi
Party	Candidate	Votes	%	±%
NDC	Collins Dauda	16,077	55.44	
NPP	Yiadom Boakye-Boateng	12,820	44.21	
NDP	Acheampong Osei Emmanuel	100	0.34	
Majority		3,257	11.23	—
Turnout		—	—	—
Registered electors		—		

2008 Ghanaian general election: Asutifi
Party	Candidate	Votes	%	±%
NDC	Collins Dauda	10,984	49.85	—
NPP	Yiadom Boakye Boateng	10,970	49.79	—
Democratic Freedom Party	Okyere George	78	0.35	—
Majority				—
Turnout		—	—	—
Registered electors		—		

2004 Ghanaian parliamentary election: Asutifi South Source:National Electoral Commission, Ghana
Party	Candidate	Votes	%	±%
NDC	Collins Dauda	9,668	51.7	+3.4
NPP	Thomas Broni	8,763	46.9	−4.8
People's National Convention (Ghana)	Nana Ababio Cosmos	218	1.2	—
CPP	Augustine Adu Adjei	51	0.3	—
Majority		905	4.8	+1.4
Turnout		18,954	88.3	
Registered electors		21,458		

Due to the death of Philip Kofi Adjapong Amoah, (NPP) candidate standing for parliament, the elections in this constituency were postponed to 3 January 2001. Cecilia Djan Amoah, the (NPP) replacement candidate and also the widow of the deceased, won the seat with a majority of 550.

Asutifi South Postponed polls, 2001
Party	Candidate	Votes	%	±%
NPP	Cecilia Gyan Amoah	8,220		—
NDC	Collins Dauda	7,670		—
National Reform Party (Ghana)	Alfred Osei Nkrumah	23		—
National Reform Party (Ghana)	Alex Osei Amankwaa	16		—
People's National Convention (Ghana)	Kwabena Yeboah	9		—
Majority				—
Turnout		16,089	68.1	
Registered electors		23,632		

1996 Ghanaian general election: Asutifi
Party	Candidate	Votes	%	±%
NDC	Collins Dauda	9,439	61.63	—
NPP	Joseph Kofi Karikari	5,793	37.82	—
People's National Convention (Ghana)	Ayuah Ayama John	84	0.55	—
People's Convention Party	Stephen Kingsley Boadu	0	0.00	—
Majority		3,646		—
Turnout		15,316		
Registered electors		23,632		

== See also ==
- List of Ghana Parliament constituencies
