= Techiman South (Ghana parliament constituency) =

Constituency in the Bono East Region of Ghana

- constituency for the Parliament of Ghana
- District: Techiman Municipal District
- Region: Bono East Region of Ghana

Current constituency
- Party: New Patriotic Party
- MP: Martin Kwaku Adjei-Mensah Korsah

Martin Kwaku Adjei-Mensah Korsah is the member of parliament for the constituency. He was elected on the ticket of the New Patriotic Party (NPP) and won a majority votes to become the MP. He succeeded Simons Addai. He had also represented the constituency in the 4th Republic parliament.

== See also ==
- List of Ghana Parliament constituencies
