= Martin Kwaku Adjei-Mensah Korsah =

Ghanaian politician

Hon. Martin Kwaku Adjei-Mensah Korsah MP
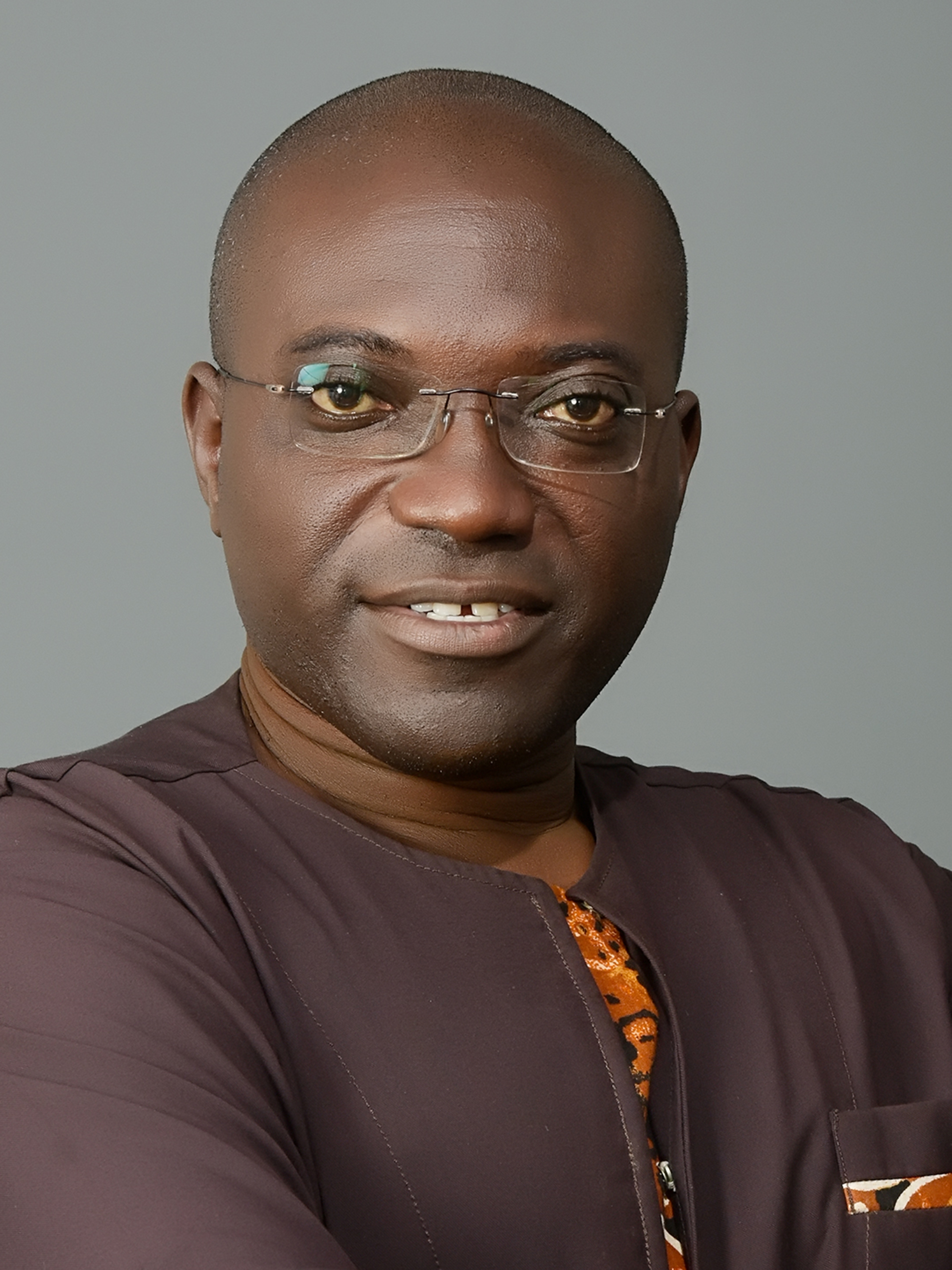

Member of Parliament for Techiman South Constituency, Deputy Minister for Local Government, Decentralization and Rural Development
- Incumbent
- Assumed office 7 January 2021

Personal details
- Born: Martin Kwaku Adjei-Mensah Korsah; 12 April 1978 (age 48) Techiman, Ghana
- Party: New Patriotic Party
- Occupation: Politician
- Profession: Basic school coordinator
- Committees: House committee; Foreign Affairs Committee

Martin Kwaku Adjei-Mensah Korsah is a Ghanaian politician and member of the Eighth Parliament of the Fourth Republic of Ghana representing the Techiman South Constituency in the Bono East Region on the ticket of the New Patriotic Party. He is currently the Deputy Minister for Local Government, Decentralization and Rural Development.

== Early life and education ==
Korsah was born on 12 April 1978 and hails from Techiman in the Bono East Region. He completed his SSSCE in 1998 where he studied Government, History and Christian Religious Studies. He received his Bachelors of Arts in Political Science in 2005 from the University of Ghana, and his master's degree in Politics and International Relations in 2007.

== Career ==
Korsah was a basic school coordinator of GES. He was also the presiding member of the Techiman Municipal Assembly. He was also the Director of Elections and Research for the New Patriotic Party.

=== Political career ===
Korsah is a member of NPP and currently the MP for the Techiman South Constituency in the Bono East Region. In the 2020 Ghana general elections, he won the parliamentary seat with 49,682 votes making 50.24% of the total votes cast whilst the NDC parliamentary aspirant Christopher Beyere Baasongti had 49,205 votes making 49.76% of the total votes cast. He was appointed as the deputy minister for Local Government, Decentralization and Rural Development.

==== Committees ====
Korsah is a member of the House committee and also a member of Employment, Social Welfare and State Enterprises Committee.
