= George William Amponsah =

Ghanaian politician

Hon. George William Amponsah

Member of Parliament for Asunafo South Constituency
- In office 7 January 2001 – 6 January 2005
- President: John Kufuor

Personal details
- Party: New Patriotic Party
- Profession: Politician

George William Amponsah is a Ghanaian politician and was the member of parliament for the Asunafo South constituency in the Brong Ahafo region of Ghana. He was a member of parliament in the 3rd parliament of the 4th republic of Ghana.

== Politics ==
Amponsah is a member of the New Patriotic Party. He was elected as the member of parliament for the Asunafo South constituency in the Brong Ahafo region in the 3rd parliament of the 4th republic of Ghana. He was succeeded by Eric Opoku of the National Democratic Congress in the 2004 Ghanaian General elections.

== Elections ==
Amponsah was elected as the member of parliament for the Asunafo South constituency in the 2000 Ghanaian general elections. He was elected on the ticket of the New Patriotic Party. His constituency was a part of the 14 parliamentary seats out of 21 seats won by the New Patriotic Party in that election for the Brong Ahafo Region. The New Patriotic Party won a majority total of 100 parliamentary seats out of 200 seats in the 3rd parliament of the 4th republic of Ghana. He was elected with 10,792 votes out of 21,524 total valid votes cast. This was equivalent to 50.9% of the total valid votes cast. He was elected over Francis Adu Poku of the National Democratic Congress, Yaw Ohene Manu of the Convention People's Party and Twumasi Ankra Kwasi of the National Reform Party. These obtained 8,816, 1,300 and 296votes respectively out of the total valid votes cast. These were equivalent to 41.6%, 6.1% and 1.4% respectively of total valid votes cast.
