= Evans Bobie Opoku =

Ghanaian politician

Hon. Evans Bobie Opoku MP
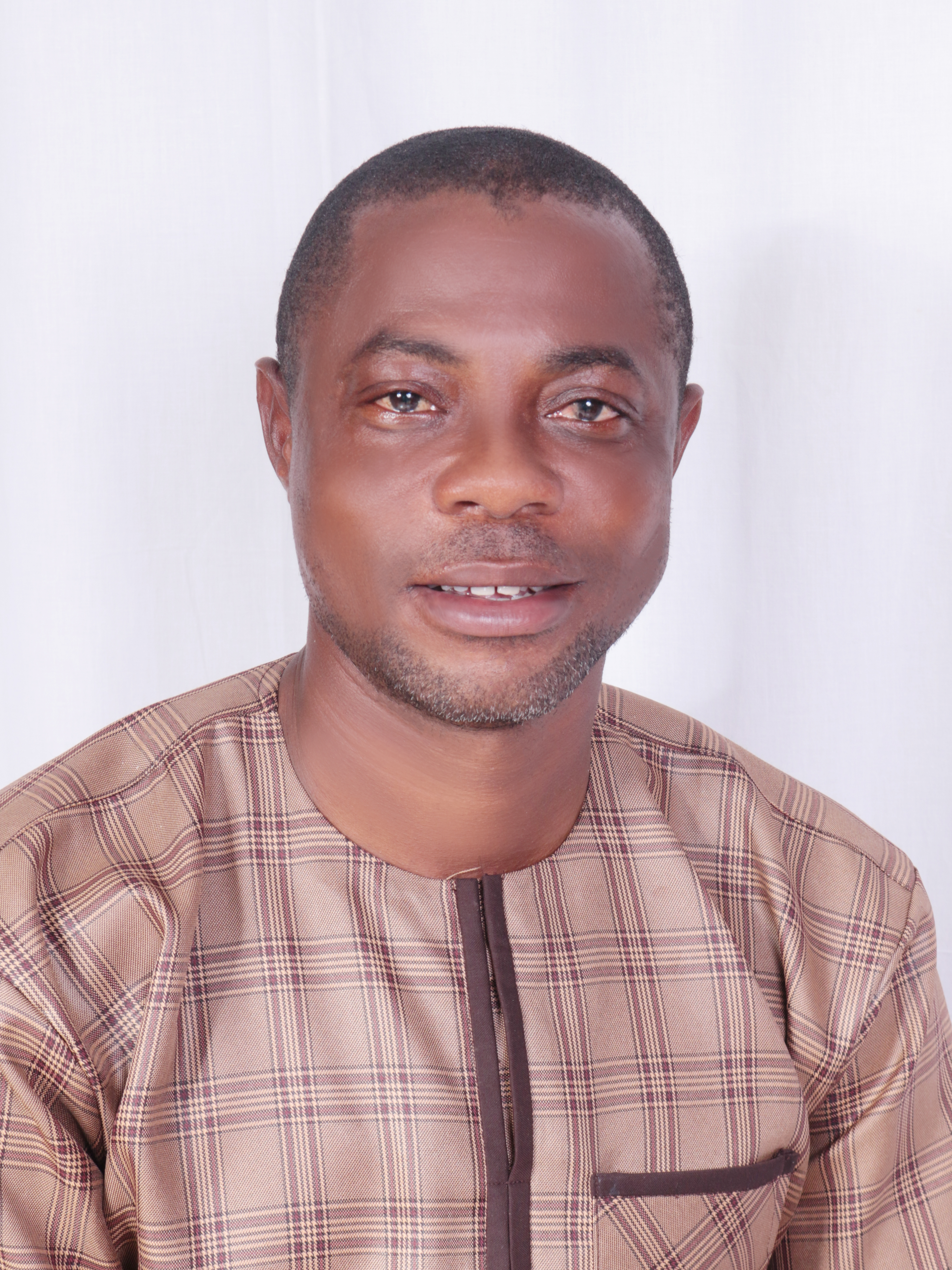

Member of the Ghana Parliament for Asunafo North
- In office 7 January 2021 – 7 January 2025
- Preceded by: Robert Sarfo-Mensah
- Succeeded by: Mohammed Haruna
- Majority: 3,394

Deputy Minister for Youth and Sports
- In office 2021 – 6 January 2025
- President: Nana Akufo-Addo
- Vice President: Mumuni Bawumia

Personal details
- Born: Evans Bobie Opoku; 1 December 1974 (age 51) Dadiesoaba, Ghana
- Party: New Patriotic Party
- Children: 4
- Occupation: Politician
- Profession: Banker
- Committees: Government Assurance committee; Environment, Science and Technology Committee

Evans Bobie Opoku is a Ghanaian politician who served as a member of the Seventh Parliament and Eighth Parliament of the Fourth Republic of Ghana representing the Asunafo North Constituency in the Ahafo Region on the ticket of the New Patriotic Party. In 2021, Nana Akufo-Addo appointed and swore him in as the Deputy Minister for Youth and Sports.

== Early life and education ==
Evans Bobie Opoku was born on 1 December 1974 and hails from Dadiesoaba in the Ahafo region. He completed his BECE in 1990 and his SSSCE in 1993 at Gyamfi Kumanin senior High school/ Ahafoman senior High Technical school. He further had his GCE in 1996. He later obtained his diploma in Adult education from the University of Ghana in 2002. He further continued his education to gain his bachelor's degree in Social work and Psychology in 2008 from the University of Ghana. In 2012, he had his master's degree in Development Management from the University of Cape Coast and in 2020, he had his LLB in Law.

He lost to Mohammed Haruna of the National Democratic Congress (NDC) party in the 2024 general elections in Ghana.

== Career ==
Evans was the General manager from 2010 to 2016 and also the Credit manager for the Ahafo Community Bank Limited from 2002 to 2006. He was a tutor from 1997 to 1999.

=== Political career ===
Evans is a member of NPP and currently the MP for the Asunafo North Constituency in the Ahafo region. In the 2020 Ghana general elections, he won the parliamentary seat with 34,684 votes whilst the NDC parliamentary aspirant Mohammed Haruna had 31,340 votes. He was formerly the Regional Minister for the Bono Ahafo region and the Regional minister for the Ahafo region. He was appointed as the deputy minister for Youth and sports. He was also appointed the care-taker as regional minister for the Bono-East region.

==== Committees ====
Evans is a member of the Government Assurance committee and also a member of Environment, Science and Technology Committee.

== Personal life ==
Evans is a Christian.

== Philanthropy ==
In 2020, Evans presented veronica buckets, soaps and other items to the people of the Asunafo North Constituency during the COVID-19 pandemic.
