= Acherensua =

- Location of Acherensua in Ghana
- Coordinates: 6°58′N 2°18′W
- Country: Ghana
- Region: Ahafo Region

Acherensua is a town in the Ahafo Region of Ghana. The town is known for the Acherensua Secondary School. The school is a second cycle institution.

== Economy ==
Agricultural farming is the predominant work in Acherensua. The major cash crops grown in this area are Cocoa and Rice Foodstuffs such as Plantain and Cassava are also grown here.
