= Ebenezer Kwaku Addo =

Ghanaian politician

Hon. Ebenezer Kwaku Addo MP

Member of the Ghana Parliament for Asutifi North
- Incumbent
- Assumed office 7 January 2025
- Preceded by: Patrick Banor
- President: John Mahama
- Vice President: Jane Naana Opoku-Agyemang

Personal details
- Born: 13 May 1987 (age 39)
- Party: National Democratic Congress
- Education: Kwame Nkrumah University of Science and Technology; Catholic University of Ghana
- Profession: Politician

Ebenezer Kwaku Addo (born 13 May 1987) is a Ghanaian politician who is a member of the ninth parliament of the fourth republic of Ghana representing Asutifi North (Ghana parliament constituency) in the Ahafo Region. He is a member of National Democratic Congress.

== Early life and education ==
Addo was born on 13 May 1987. He attended Hope Junior High School, where he completed the Basic Education Certificate Examination (BECE) in April 2003, and subsequently attended Sunyani Senior High School, completing the West African Senior School Certificate Examination (WASSCE) in June 2006.

He obtained a Diploma from the Institute of Commercial Management in March 2010 and a Bachelor of Arts degree from the Kwame Nkrumah University of Science and Technology (KNUST) in August 2012. In May 2024, he obtained a Master of Business Administration from the Catholic University of Ghana.

== Career ==
Addo began his professional career as an instructor with the National Service Secretariat. He subsequently joined the Ghana Health Service, where he held a number of administrative positions. He served as an Administrative Manager before becoming Senior Administrative Manager and later to Principal Administrative Manager.

== Politics ==
=== 2020 Ghanaian general election ===
Addo contested the Asutifi North parliamentary seat on the ticket of National Democratic Congress in the 2020 Ghanaian general election but lost the election to Patrick Banor of the New Partriotic Party with 16,452 which is equivalent to 46.75%.

==== 2024 Ghanaian general election ====
Addo contested the Asutifi North (Ghana parliament constituency) in the Ahafo Region again on the ticket of the National Democratic Congress during the 2024 Ghanaian general election and won with 18,584 representing 56.67%. He won the election over the New Patriotic Party candidate Patrick Banor who polled 14, 207 which is equivalent to 43.33%.
