= Asutifi District =

- Former District
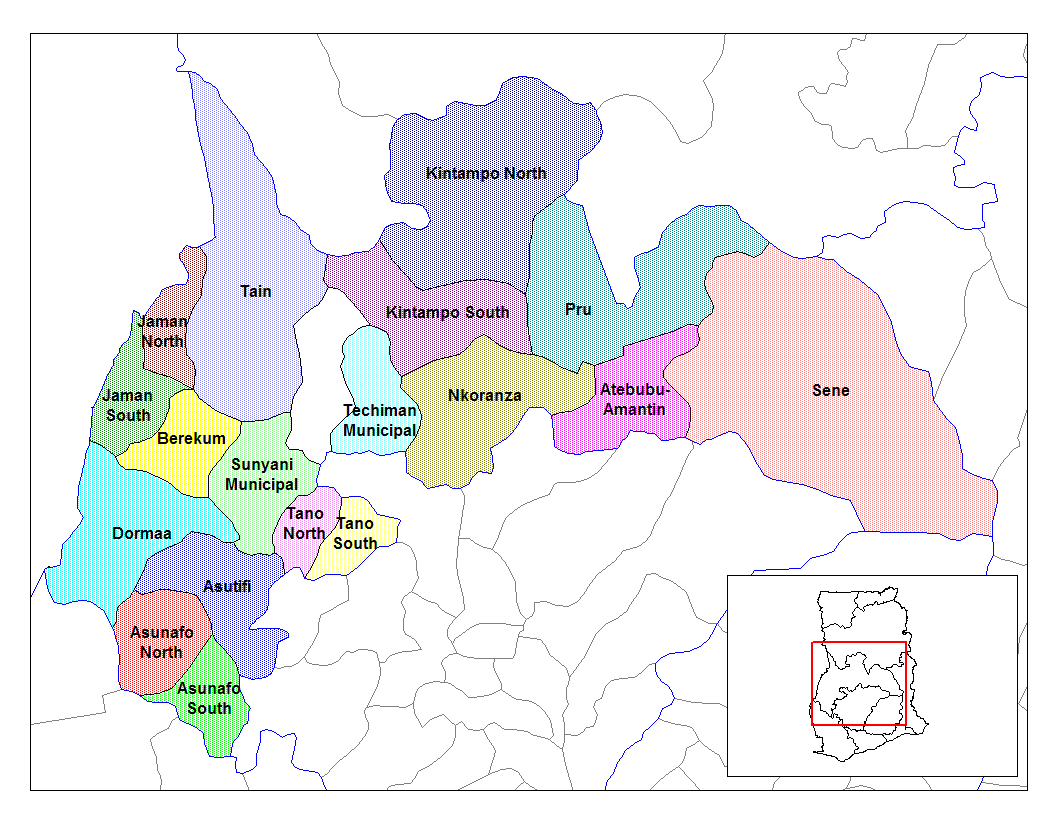
- Districts of Brong-Ahafo Region

- Location of Asutifi District within Brong-Ahafo
- Coordinates: 6°59′N 2°23′W
- Country: Ghana
- Region: Brong-Ahafo
- Capital: Kenyasi

Government
  - District Executive: Anthony Mensah

Area
  - Total: 1,799 km^{2} (695 sq mi)

Population (2012)
  - Total: —
- Time zone: UTC+0 (GMT)

Asutifi District is a former district that was located in Brong-Ahafo Region (now currently in Ahafo Region), Ghana. Originally created as an ordinary district assembly in 1988. However on 1 February 2012 (effectively 28 June 2012), it was split off into two new districts: Asutifi North District (capital: Kenyasi) and Asutifi South District (capital: Hwidiem). The district assembly was located in the southwest part of Brong-Ahafo Region (now central part of Ahafo Region) and had Kenyasi as its capital town.

== List of settlements ==
Settlements of Asutifi District
No.	Settlement	Population	Population year
1	Acherensua		
2	Asukese		
3	Biaso		
4	Dadiesoaba		
5	Gambia		
6	Gyedu		
7	Hwidiem		
8	Kensere		
9	Kenyasi		
10	Mehame		
11	Nkrankrom		
12	Ntotroso		
13	Obengkrom		
14	Sienkyem		
15	Wamahiniso		
16	Wuramumuso		

== Sources ==
- "Asutifi District". Statoids.
- District: Asutifi District
