= Asutifi North (district) =

District in Ahafo Region, Ghana

Asutifi North District
- District
- Location of Asutifi North District within Ahafo Region
- Coordinates: 6°59′N 2°23′W
- Country: Ghana
- Region: Brong-Ahafo
- Capital: Kenyasi

Population (2021)
  - Total: 73,556
- Time zone: UTC+0 (GMT)

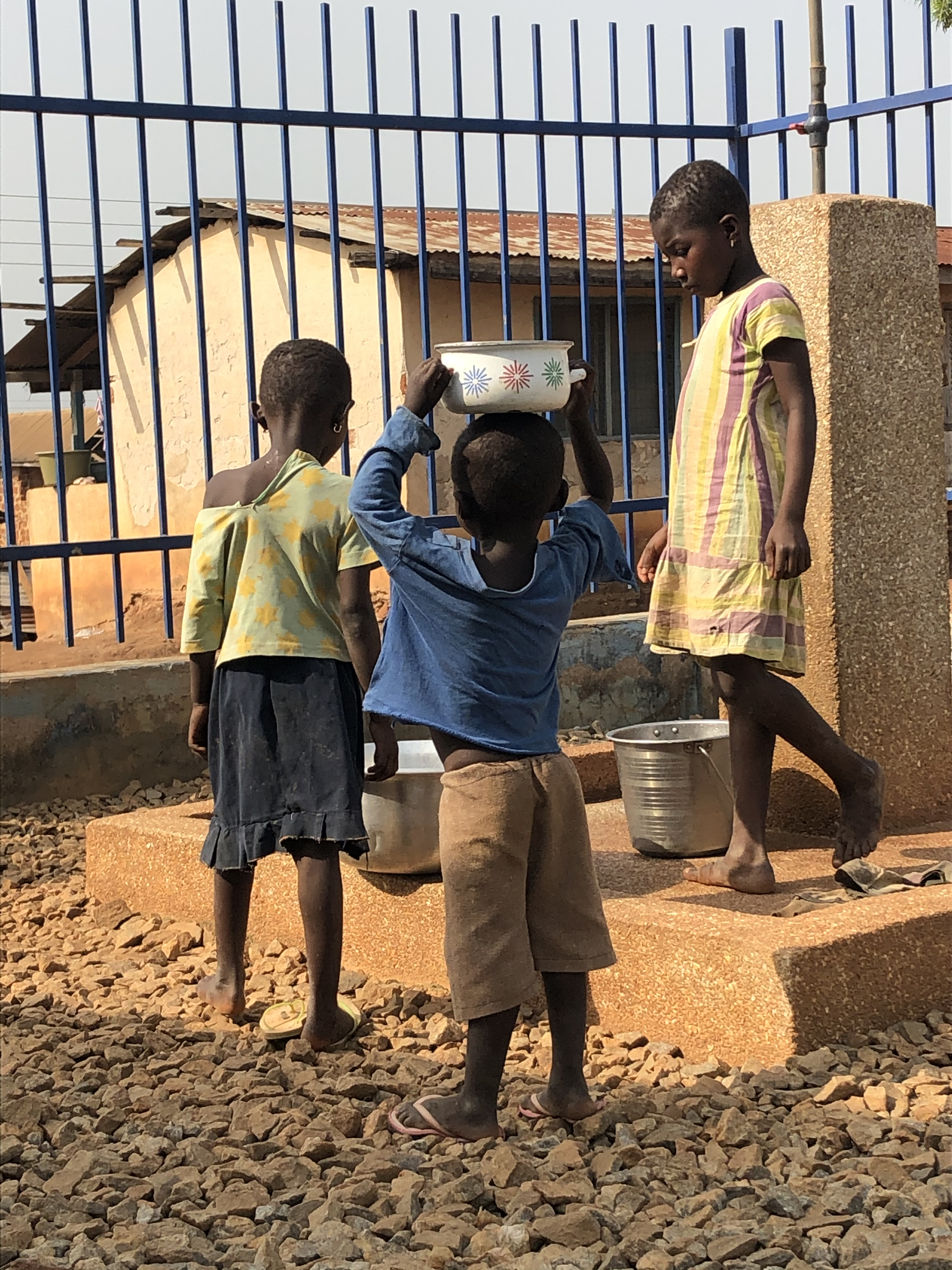
Children fetching water.

Asutifi North District is one of the six districts in Ahafo Region, Ghana. The District was formerly part of the then-larger Asutifi District since 1988, until the southern part of the district was split off to create Asutifi South District on 28 June 2012. The remaining northern part is Asutifi North District. The district assembly is located in the eastern part of Ahafo Region and has Kenyasi as its capital town.

== Population ==
Asutifi North District population according to 2021 population and housing census stands at 73,556 (Ghana Statistical Service in 2021). The district is predominately rural, as 68% of the total population reside in rural areas. A majority (68%) of the residents engage in agricultural activities, although the presence of large-scale mining activities has led to a growing service industry (as of 2014).

== Water and sanitation infrastructure ==
Close to 15% of the district population do not have access to basic water services. These households mostly use water from rivers, streams, unprotected wells and springs, dugouts, and tanker services.

With regard to sanitation, public toilet facilities are the most common, with almost half of the population relying on public facilities as their primary sanitation facility. Close to 5% of the population practice open defecation in fields and bushes.
