= Witch camp =

Segregated settlements in Ghana

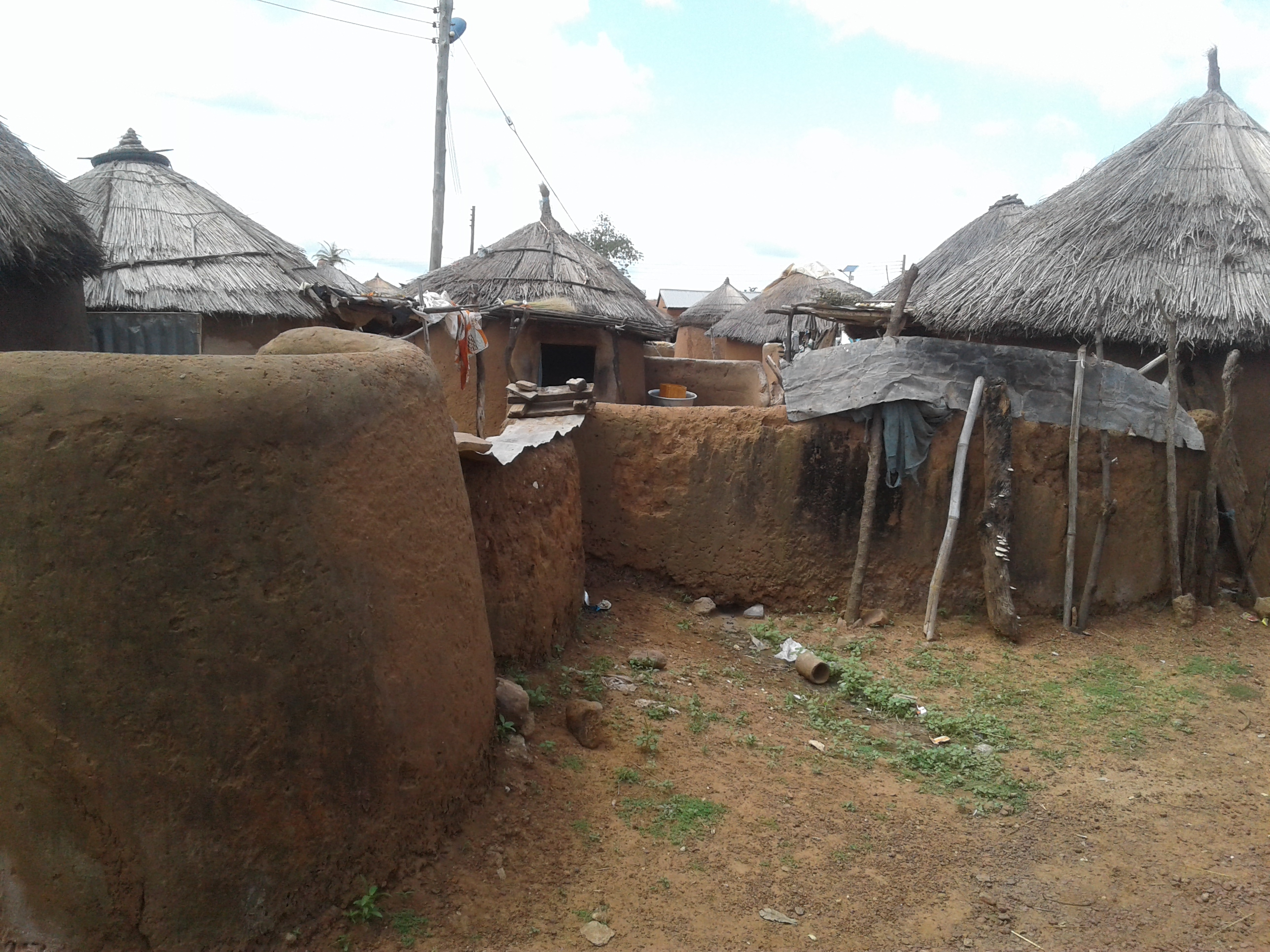
Witch camp in Nalerigu, Ghana

Witch camps are settlements where women in Ghana who have been accused of being witches can flee for safety. Women in such camps have been accused of witchcraft for various reasons, including mental illness. Some camps are thought to have been created in the early 20th century. The Ghanaian government has enacted measures to eliminate such camps.

== Description ==
Women suspected of being witches sometimes flee to witch camp settlements for safety, often in order to avoid being lynched by neighbours.

Many women in such camps are widows; relatives are believed to accuse them of witchcraft in order to seize their late husbands' possessions. Many women in the witch camps also suffer from mental illness, a poorly understood phenomenon in Ghana. In one camp in Gambaga in the north, women are given protection by the local chieftain, and in return, pay him and work in his fields.

In 2015, the Anti-Witchcraft Allegations Campaign Coalition-Ghana (AWACC-Ghana) reported that the number of outcasts residing in witch camps was growing, and that food supplies there are insufficient. A 2022 report by the Humanist Global Charity noted that conditions were still very difficult with inadequate housing and infrastructure.

== Locations ==
In 2012 there were at least six witch camps in Ghana, housing a total of approximately 1,000 women. The camps are located in Bonyasi, Gambaga, Gnani, Kpatinga, Kukuo and Naabuli, all in Northern Ghana. Some of the camps are thought to have been created over 100 years ago.

In 2012, the Ghanaian government announced its intent to close the witch camps and educate the public that witches do not exist. In December 2014, Minister for Gender and Social Protection Nana Oye Bampoe Addo disbanded the Bonyasi camp located in Central Gonja District and re-integrated its residents into their communities. As of 2015, the Ghanaian government had shut down several witch camps.

By 2020, there were four camps in Ghana, at Gambaga, Kukuo, Gnani and Kpantiga, housing over 500 people.

== Legal changes ==
In July 2023, the Ghanaian Parliament passed a bill to proscribe witchcraft accusations; this bill criminalised the practice of accusing or labelling people as witches. This came after the 2020 murder of 90-year-old Akua Denteh in Kafaba, who had been accused of witchcraft.

However, at April 2024, the Ghanaian president had not yet given assent to the bill.

== See also ==
- Gambaga Witch camp
- Witchcraft in Ghana
- Prayer camps
- Spirit children
- Ritual servitude
- Fetish priest
