= Denteh =

Denteh is a surname. Notable people with the name include:

- Paulina Mefia Denteh, Ghanaian doctor
- Mariama Akua Denteh (c. 1930 – 2020), Ghanaian farmer
