= Gambaga Witch camp =

Segregated community in Ghana

Coordinates: 10°31′50″N 0°26′32″W

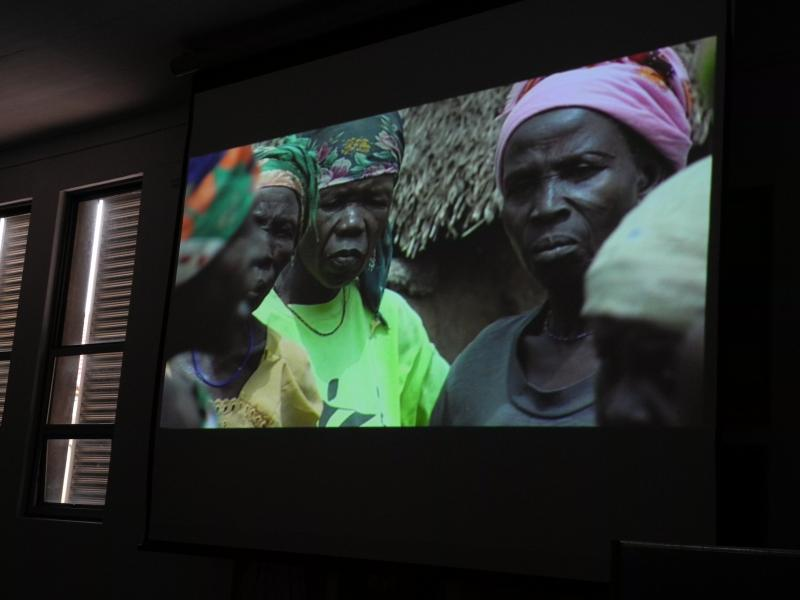
Still from a video by Yaba Badoe documenting the lives of inmates of Gambaga witches camp

Gambaga Witch Camp is a segregated community within Gambaga township in the North East Region of Ghana established as a shelter to accommodate alleged witches and wizards who are banished from their communities on accusations of practicing witchcraft.

The camp has about 25 round huts, and holds about 100 inmates. No health services or indoor plumbing are available.

Many women in Ghana's witch camps are widows and it is thought that relatives accused them of witchcraft. Other inmates in the camp have been accused of using black magic to cause misfortunes in their community. Many women also are mentally ill, a little understood problem in Ghana. In Gambaga, the women are given protection by the local chieftain.

Yaba Badoe made a documentary film, The Witches of Gambaga about the alleged witches.

== See also ==
- Kayayei
- Witchcraft accusations against children in Africa
