= Maya Rockeymoore Cummings =

American politician and author (born 1971)

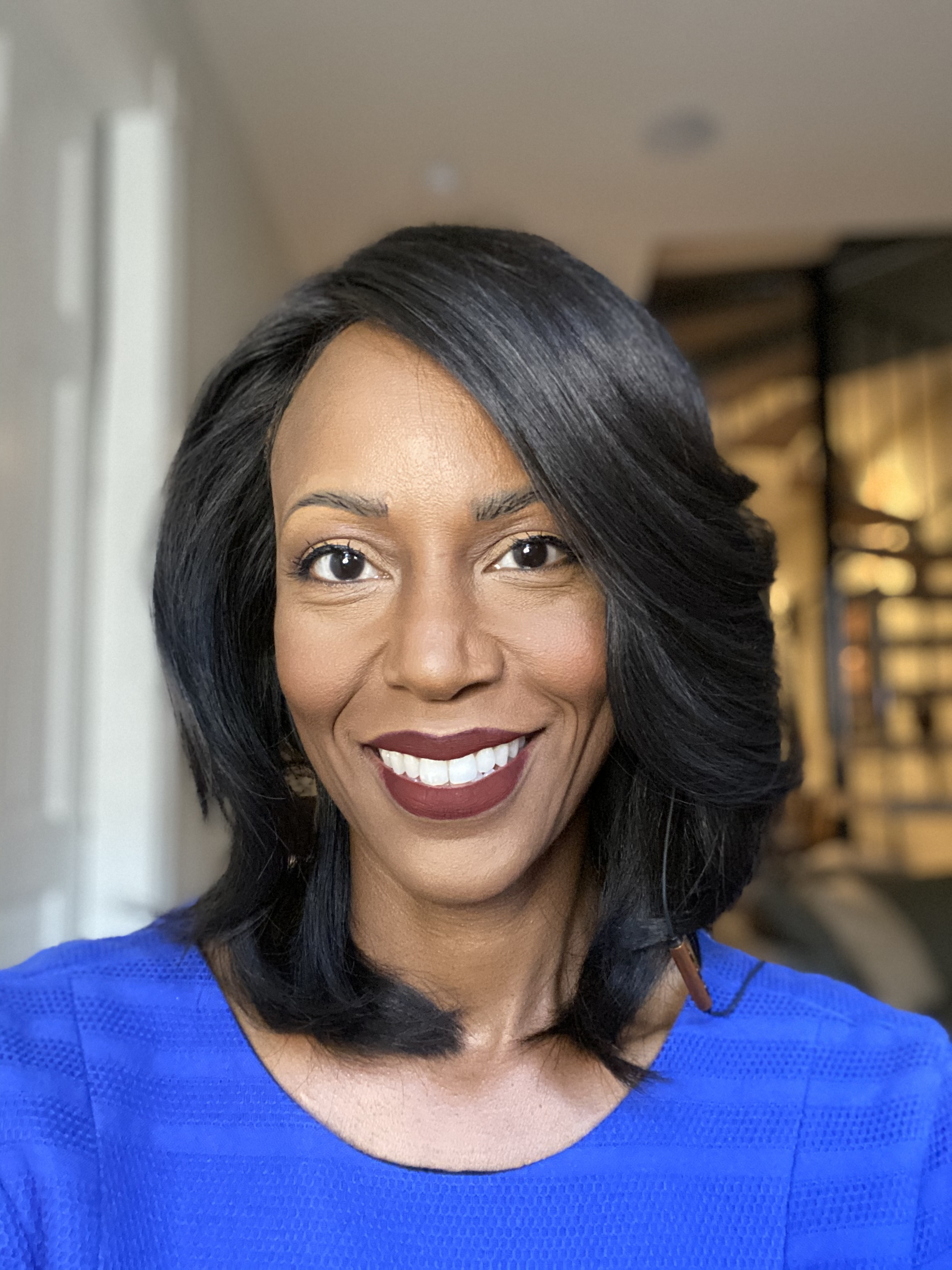

Chair of the Maryland Democratic Party
- In office December 1, 2018 – November 11, 2019
- Preceded by: Kathleen Matthews
- Succeeded by: Cory V. McCray (Acting)

Personal details
- Born: Maya Michelle Rockeymoore; January 31, 1971 (age 55) Wichita Falls, Texas, U.S.
- Party: Democratic
- Spouse: Elijah Cummings (m. 2008; died 2019)
- Education: Prairie View A&M University (BA); Purdue University (MA, PhD)
- Occupation: Political scientist; political candidate; public health advocate; entrepreneur; author; political staffer; non-profit leader; public health program director; think tank founder; academic

Dr. Maya Michelle Rockeymoore Cummings (born January 31, 1971) is an American political scientist, public health advocate, technology entrepreneur, and author. She is the founder and chief executive officer of HyperVigilant, a health technology company developing artificial intelligence tools to detect and manage cardiometabolic health risks.

She is the author of RAGEism: Racism, Ageism and the Quest for Liberation Democracy, which coined the term "rageism" to describe the compounding structural harm produced by the simultaneous operation of racism and ageism across political institutions and public policy.

Over a career spanning more than three decades, Rockeymoore Cummings has worked as a congressional staffer, nonprofit leader, public health program director, think tank founder, academic fellow, and entrepreneur.

She previously served as a Nonresident Senior Fellow at the Brookings Institution and as a Visiting Fellow at the Johns Hopkins University SNF Agora Institute. She founded Global Policy Solutions (2005) and the Center for Global Policy Solutions (2012), organizations focused on economic inequality, health disparities, and social insurance policy. Her commentary has appeared in the Washington Post, the New York Times, Forbes, CNN, MS NOW, Fox News, BBC, and Al Jazeera.

She served as chair of the Maryland Democratic Party from 2018 to 2019.

== Early life and career ==
Rockeymoore Cummings was born in Wichita Falls, Texas. She is the daughter of Thomas Rockeymoore of San Antonio, Texas, and Hazel Rockeymoore (d. 2015). Her father served as president of the local San Antonio NAACP chapter and led the Bexar County Democratic Party in the mid-1990s, and was a volunteer with COPS/Metro Alliance. Her mother was a lifetime NAACP member, an ACLU member, and worked for the election of President Barack Obama.

She is the fourth generation from slavery on her mother's side; her parents were raised in the Jim Crow South a personal history that has directly informed her scholarship on structural racism, ageism, and their compounding effects on marginalized communities.

As the daughter of a United States Air Force officer, Rockeymoore Cummings spent her childhood living across the United States and abroad as a result of her father's military assignments, attending John Jay High School in San Antonio, Texas, where she was later honored as a Pillar of Character by the Northside Education Foundation.

She earned a Bachelor of Arts in political science and mass communications from Prairie View A&M University, a historically Black university in Texas. She subsequently received a Master of Arts and a Ph.D. in political science from Purdue University, where her graduate studies encompassed American politics, international relations, public policy, and African American studies. Her dissertation, The African American Political Response to HIV/AIDS: A Case Study of the Congressional Black Caucus in the 105th Congress, examined the intersection of race, legislative politics, and public health policy.

Purdue University honored her with its Distinguished Alumni Award in 2022. She was also named an Aspen Institute Henry Crown Fellow in 2004, a selective leadership development program for mid-career entrepreneurs and civic innovators.

== Career ==
=== Congressional career ===
Following graduate school, Rockeymoore Cummings built a career on Capitol Hill. From 1997 to 1998 she served as a Congressional Black Caucus Legislative Fellow in the Office of Congressman Melvin Watt (D-NC), advising the Member on Social Security, health, welfare, Medicare, and Medicaid policy.

She then joined the professional staff of the House Committee on Ways and Means, Social Security Subcommittee, where she produced policy analysis on Social Security benefits and related legislative proposals and helped build coalitions among advocacy organizations with a shared interest in strengthening the Social Security system.

From 1999 to 2000 she served as Administrative Assistant and Chief of Staff in the Office of Congressman Charles Rangel (D-NY), managing a staff of fourteen and a budget of more than $1 million. In that role she helped facilitate passage of the African Growth and Opportunity Act and oversaw constituent services and legislative operations.

She has testified before both chambers of the United States Congress on multiple occasions, providing expert testimony on Social Security policy and its implications for vulnerable populations and the middle class. Her formal appearances include testimony before the U.S. House Committee on Ways and Means, Subcommittee on Social Security, on May 17, 2005, in a hearing titled First Do No Harm: Protecting and Strengthening Social Security’s Value for Vulnerable Populations. She later testified before the U.S. Senate Committee on Finance, Subcommittee on Social Security, Pensions, and Family Policy, on May 21, 2014, in a hearing entitled “How Structural Factors Drive the Need to Expand Social Security Benefits for Future Retirees.” More recently, she appeared again before the U.S. House Committee on Ways and Means, Subcommittee on Social Security, on March 12, 2019, in a hearing titled “Protecting and Improving Social Security: Enhancing Social Security to Strengthen the Middle Class.”

=== Early policy and advocacy career ===
From 2001 to 2003 Rockeymoore Cummings served as Senior Resident Scholar at the National Urban League Institute for Opportunity and Equality in Washington, D.C. In that role she served as principal investigator for a $1.5 million federally funded program focused on diabetes prevention and control among underserved populations work that foreshadowed her later focus on cardiometabolic health technology.

From 2003 to 2005 she served as Vice President for Research and Programs at the Congressional Black Caucus Foundation, where she established the research and policy agenda for the Foundation's Center for Policy Analysis and Research, authored and commissioned several influential policy studies, and co-wrote grants totaling more than $1.2 million.

=== Policy research organizations ===
==== Global Policy Solutions ====
In 2005, Rockeymoore Cummings founded Global Policy Solutions LLC, a public policy consultancy providing research, program development, and strategic communications services to nonprofit organizations, foundations, corporations, and government agencies on issues including health equity, economic opportunity, and community development. Representative clients have included the Robert Wood Johnson Foundation, the Congressional Black Caucus Foundation, the Alliance for Excellent Education, and the National League of Cities Institute for Youth Education and Families.

==== Center for Global Policy Solutions ====
In 2012, Rockeymoore Cummings established the Center for Global Policy Solutions, a 501(c)(3) nonprofit think tank that produced research on economic inequality, racial health disparities, and structural barriers to social mobility in the United States. She led the organization as president until it was voluntarily dissolved by its board of directors in October 2021.

The Center's signature initiative was the Closing the Racial Wealth Gap Initiative, a Ford Foundation-funded national collaborative that Rockeymoore Cummings co-directed, conducted in partnership with the Insight Center for Community Economic Development.

The Initiative's flagship publication was Beyond Broke: Why Closing the Racial Wealth Gap is a Priority for National Economic Security (Center for Global Policy Solutions, May 2014), co-authored by Rockeymoore Cummings with Rebecca Tippett, Avis Jones-DeWeever, Darrick Hamilton, and William A. Darity Jr. Drawing on U.S. Census Bureau data and the National Asset Scorecard in Communities of Color, the report documented that in the recovery period following the Great Recession, the average African American and Latino household held only six and seven cents respectively for every dollar of wealth held by the typical white family, and that over two-thirds of African Americans and nearly three-quarters of Latinos were "liquid asset poor." The report received national coverage including segments on MSNBC and in the Detroit Free Press, National Catholic Reporter, and BlackPressUSA, and was presented at the 2014 Color of Wealth Summit at the U.S. Capitol Visitors Center.

Among the Center's other publications was Stick Shift: Autonomous Vehicles, Driving Jobs, and the Future of Work (2017), which she co-authored the first study to examine the labor market impact of level-5 autonomous vehicle technology in the United States, finding that approximately 4 million driving jobs were at risk of displacement.

In 2019, The Washington Post reported on financial management concerns at the Center, including accounting irregularities between the nonprofit and Rockeymoore Cummings's affiliated consulting firm. Following a formal audit of the Center's Form 990 returns for the tax period ended December 31, 2018, the Internal Revenue Service issued a no-change determination, stating: "We accepted your forms as filed," and confirming that the organization "continued to qualify for exemption from federal income tax" until its voluntary dissolution on October 21, 2021.

=== Social insurance and economic policy ===
Social Security and retirement security policy has been a central thread throughout Rockeymoore Cummings's career, from her earliest work as a congressional staffer through three decades of research, testimony, and public advocacy. She served as co-chair of the Commission to Modernize Social Security, a bipartisan body convened to examine long-term policy options for strengthening the Social Security system. She also served as chair of the National Committee to Preserve Social Security and Medicare, one of the nation's leading advocacy organizations on these issues.

In 2010, she co-authored Tough Times Require Strong Social Security Benefits: Views on Social Security Among African Americans, Hispanic Americans, and White Americans with Melissa Maitan Shepard, published by the National Academy of Social Insurance as part of a polling study commissioned to mark the program's 75th anniversary. The brief found that support for strengthening Social Security was strong across all racial groups, with 91 percent of African Americans and Hispanic Americans compared to 77 percent of whites agreeing that society has an obligation to provide a secure retirement for all workers.

In 2015, she contributed to The New York Times Room for Debate series, arguing that concerns about the long-term sustainability of Medicare and Medicaid were overstated and that the programs' futures would be determined by fiscal policy choices rather than structural flaws.

=== Public health work ===
Rockeymoore Cummings has been a member of the National Academy of Social Insurance from 2003 to 2019, serving on its board of directors from 2014 to 2019 an organization that convenes leading experts on social insurance policy across health, income security, and disability. In 2006 she served on NASI's Study Panel on Medicare and Disparities, which produced the seminal report Strengthening Medicare's Role in Reducing Racial and Ethnic Health Disparities, edited by Bruce C. Vladeck, Paul N. Van de Water, and June Eichner. The panel concluded that Medicare was obligated to take the lead in reducing racial and ethnic health disparities throughout the health system and issued 17 policy recommendations across five areas, including making the reduction of disparities a top administrative priority. The report was funded primarily by the Robert Wood Johnson Foundation.

From 2007 to 2017 Rockeymoore Cummings directed Leadership for Healthy Communities, a $16 million national program of the Robert Wood Johnson Foundation aimed at reducing childhood obesity through community-level policy and systems change. The program supported state and local strategies related to nutrition, physical activity, and equitable community design, and engaged directly with school, local, and state policymakers across the country.

Her peer-reviewed scholarship from this period includes a study published in the Centers for Disease Control and Prevention journal Preventing Chronic Disease on promoting healthy eating and physical activity in out-of-school settings, co-authored with researchers from Tufts University and the CDC. Her commentary on childhood obesity and community health policy appeared in the American Journal of Preventive Medicine and the National Association of State Boards of Education, State Education Standard, among other publications.

=== Technology and data policy ===
In October 2016, Rockeymoore Cummings launched the ADELPHI (Advancing Data Equity, Leadership, Policy, Health, and Innovation) Strategy Collective through the Center for Global Policy Solutions. Funded by Google, the initiative convened experts across technology, health, education, human rights, design, finance, and civic engagement including the Haas Institute for a Fair and Inclusive Society at the University of California, Berkeley, and the National Organization for Women to examine the use of big data, machine learning, and virtual reality as tools for equity-centered policy.

She also participated as a panelist in Google's Next Gen Leaders' Summit in 2016 and 2017, speaking on artificial intelligence, machine learning, and their implications for social justice and economic opportunity, and spoke at the NewCo Shift Forum in San Francisco in February 2017 on the future of labor and automation.

In 2024, Rockeymoore Cummings served as principal investigator of Tangled in the Web: Patient Safety and Privacy Concerns When Seeking Knowledge, Community, and Support Online, a community-based participatory research study examining patient and caregiver use of digital technology, online health communities, and artificial intelligence in medicine. The study, funded by a grant from the Robert Wood Johnson Foundation and published by The Light Collective a nonprofit organization dedicated to amplifying patient community voices in health technology surveyed patients, patient advocates, and caregivers about the benefits, risks, and privacy concerns of seeking health information and support online.

In March 2017, coinciding with the publication of Stick Shift, Rockeymoore Cummings published a cluster of technology policy essays in national outlets that established her as a leading voice on the intersection of automation, race, and the social safety net. Writing in WIRED, she argued that cutting social services in an era of robotic job displacement would accelerate economic harm to vulnerable workers. In NewCo Shift she made the affirmative case that the technology industry had a direct responsibility to support a stronger safety net as a condition of its disruption of labor markets. In The Root, she translated the Stick Shift findings directly for Black readers, examining the disproportionate risk autonomous vehicle technology posed to Black workers concentrated in driving occupations.

=== Academic appointments ===
Rockeymoore Cummings has held several research appointments at Johns Hopkins University. From 2022 to 2023 she was Distinguished Presidential Research Fellow at the Bloomberg School of Public Health, conducting research at the intersection of public policy, public health, and equity. She continued as a Visiting Scholar at the Bloomberg School from 2023 to 2024, managing the HOPE Challenge policy project supported by the Johns Hopkins Center for Health Disparities Solutions and serving as principal investigator of Tangled in the Web, a Robert Wood Johnson Foundation funded community-based participatory research study examining patient and caregiver use of digital technology and perceptions of artificial intelligence in medicine. From 2024 she has served as a Visiting Fellow at the Johns Hopkins University SNF Agora Institute, where she completed the manuscript for RAGEism.

She has served as a Nonresident Senior Fellow at the Brookings Institution since 2021, writing on health equity, economic security, and diversity, equity, and inclusion.

She previously served as an adjunct professor at the American University Women & Politics Institute in Washington, D.C., where she designed and taught the course The Politics and Policy of Race and Gender for two semesters.

=== HyperVigilant ===
Rockeymoore Cummings is the founder and chief executive officer of HyperVigilant, a health technology company developing artificial intelligence tools to improve early detection and management of cardiometabolic health risks — a category of conditions including heart disease, type 2 diabetes, hypertension, and metabolic syndrome that disproportionately affect Black Americans, Latino Americans, and other underserved populations.

In 2025, HyperVigilant was selected for the Capital Readiness Program at the University City Science Center in Philadelphia, a competitive accelerator program designed to prepare early-stage health technology companies for institutional investment.

== Writings and publications ==
=== Books ===
RAGEism: Racism, Ageism and the Quest for Liberation Democracy (2026) coins the term "rageism" defined as a systematic and persistent form of race, ethnicity, and age-based discrimination that uses political institutions and public policy to undermine the quality and length of life of marginalized communities from pre-birth to death and across generations. The book has drawn endorsements from Hillary Rodham Clinton and Daniel E. Dawes, founding dean of the Meharry School of Global Health, among others. The work was previewed in a presentation at the Johns Hopkins SNF Agora Institute in June 2025 and has been cited in peer-reviewed literature.

She is also the author of The Political Action Handbook: A How-To Guide for the Hip Hop Generation (2004), and co-editor of Strengthening Community: Social Insurance in a Diverse America (2004), co-edited with Kathleen A. Buto, Martha Priddy Patterson, and William Spriggs.

=== Selected journal articles and reports ===
- "Statelessness in the Black Diaspora," The Journal of International Relations, Peace Studies, and Development, vol. 6, no. 2, 2021.
- "Healthy Kids Out of School: Using Mixed Methods to Develop Principles for Promoting Healthy Eating and Physical Activity in Out-of-School Settings in the United States," Preventing Chronic Disease, CDC, vol. 11, December 2014 (with Sliwa, Sharma, Dietz, et al.).
- Active Living by Design: Implications for State and Local Officials, American Journal of Preventive Medicine, vol. 37, 2009.
- Stick Shift: Autonomous Vehicles, Driving Jobs, and the Future of Work, Center for Global Policy Solutions, 2017 (with Austin, Bucknor, and Cashman).
- Tangled in the Web: Patient Safety and Privacy Concerns When Seeking Knowledge, Community, and Support Online," The Light Collective, September 2024 (with Holdren, Downing, and Robinson).

== Journalism and commentary ==
Rockeymoore Cummings has written opinion essays and commentary for The Washington Post, The New York Times, WIRED, Forbes, Time, the Houston Chronicle, the Wall Street Journal, The Root, NewCo Shift, and HuffPost, where she was a regular contributor on Social Security, economic inequality, and public health policy. Her letters to the editor have appeared in the Wall Street Journal and The New York Times.

Her technology-focused writing includes three pieces published in March 2017 that together constitute a sustained policy argument about automation, race, and the social contract:

- "Cutting Social Services Only Makes the Robotic Takeover Worse," WIRED, March 15, 2017.
- "The Gig is Up: Why Tech Must Prioritize the Safety Net," NewCo Shift, March 19, 2017.
- "Will Driverless Vehicles Put Black People Out of Work?" The Root, March 26, 2017.

== Political activity ==
In October 2017, Rockeymoore Cummings announced her candidacy for the Democratic nomination for governor of Maryland.

She later withdrew from the race following the hospitalization of her husband, U.S. Representative Elijah Cummings.

She served as chair of the Maryland Democratic Party from 2018 to 2019.

In 2020, she was a candidate in the Democratic primary for Maryland's 7th congressional district following the death of Congressman Elijah Cummings. She was defeated in the primary by Kweisi Mfume, who went on to win the seat.

=== Community engagement ===
Rockeymoore Cummings founded the Elijah E. Cummings Democracy and Freedom Festival in Baltimore to honor her late husband's legacy and promote civic engagement and democratic participation in the city he represented for more than two decades.

She is a member of Delta Sigma Theta Sorority, Incorporated, and has been active in community service throughout her career, including work with the Capitol Area Food Bank, the New Psalmist Baptist Church social justice and food ministries in Baltimore, and volunteer grant writing for Black Girls Vote.

== Personal life ==
Rockeymoore Cummings was married to U.S. Representative Elijah E. Cummings (D-MD) until his death on October 17, 2019. Congressman Cummings served Maryland's 7th congressional district from 1996 until his death and was chair of the House Committee on Oversight and Reform during the 116th Congress. The couple met when Rockeymoore Cummings was serving as Chief of Staff in the Office of Congressman Charles Rangel; Congressman Cummings flew to San Antonio to ask her father's permission before proposing. The couple lived in Baltimore, Maryland.

Party political offices
| Preceded by Kathleen Matthews | Chair of the Maryland Democratic Party; 2018–2019 | Succeeded by Cory V. McCray; Acting |
