= Killing of Akua Denteh =

2020 murder of an accused witch

- Location: Kafaba, Savannah Region, Ghana
- Date: 23 July 2020
- Attack type: Witch hunt
- Victim: Akua Denteh
- No. of participants: 15+
- Accused: Sherina Mohammed and Latifa Bumaye
- Charges: 12 years' imprisonment
- Verdict: Guilty
- Convictions: Manslaughter

On 23 July 2020, Mariama Akua Denteh, a 90-year-old woman, was severely beaten in the market of Kafaba, a village near the town of Salaga in the Savannah Region of Ghana, after being accused of being a witch. She died later that day of her injuries. A video of the attack went viral on social media, leading to condemnation from Ghanaian politicians, human rights groups, and citizens.

In 2022, two of the women filmed beating Denteh were sentenced to 12 years in prison for manslaughter. The following year, as a result of Denteh's death, the Parliament of Ghana passed the Anti-Witchcraft Accusations Bill, which would have made it a criminal offence to accuse someone of being a witch, in addition to mandating practical and emotional support for people accused of being witches. However, in December 2023, the President of Ghana, Nana Akufo-Addo, declined to sign the bill, citing "constitutional concerns". As of July 2026, there remains no legislation criminalising witchcraft accusations in Ghana, or offering support to people who are accused.

== Context ==
Belief in witchcraft remains prevalent in Ghana; it has been variously attributed to the legacy of the colonial era, as well as the traditional beliefs of different ethnic groups in the country, including the Akan people. Ghana remains a highly religious society, with 96% of the population identifying as religious; while the most common religions are Christianity and Islam, these are often practised alongside thoughts, beliefs, and practices stemming from African traditional beliefs.

Belief in witchcraft, and thus also witchcraft accusations, remain prevalent in the north of Ghana, including in the Savannah Region and the Northern Region. Priestesses and diviners are often seen as speaking with the voice of God, leading to their descriptions of people as being witches being taken seriously by the communities they serve; village chiefs can often feel pressure to banish accused witches as a result. The Ghanaian women's rights organisation Songtaba has identified that accusations of witchcraft are more likely to take place in communities that have experienced "misfortune", such as illness and death. Women, particularly those living in poverty, with illness or disability, or who do not conform to traditional gender roles and expectations, are most likely to be accused of being witches; though some men are also accused.

As belief in witchcraft is more prevalent in rural areas, oftentimes people accused of being witches are unable to access the police or government agencies to seek support and protection. Many accused instead flee to witch camps to avoid being attacked or lynched, such as those in Gnani, Kukuo, Nabuli, and Gambaga.

While belief in witchcraft is protected under international law through the International Covenant on Civil and Political Rights, signed by Ghana, the right is limited "as necessary to protect public safety, order, health, morals, or the fundamental rights and freedoms of others". Ghana has also ratified the Convention on the Elimination of All Forms of Discrimination Against Women, which defined witchcraft accusations as a "harmful practice".

== Accusation and lynching ==
Mariama Akua Denteh was born in around 1930 in Kafaba, a village in the north of what was then the Gold Coast, a colony of the United Kingdom, and which is today located in the East Gonja Municipal District of the Savannah Region of the Republic of Ghana. Denteh was one of eight children. She was not educated, and instead worked as a farmer for much of her life. She had eight children, two sons and four daughters of which survived into adulthood. Denteh had lived in Kafaba her entire life, and had never previously been accused of being a witch.

On 22 July 2020, a fetish priest, later identified as Sherina Mohammed, was understood to have accused Denteh of being a witch, citing "misfortunes" that had occurred in Kafaba, including the burning of a New Patriotic Party youth shed, and a lack of rainfall. A crowd subsequently forced entry into her home and hit her with canes for around an hour, while demanding she confess to being a witch. It has been reported that after being threatened with a machete, Denteh confessed to being responsible for the deaths of three of her children through witchcraft, though it has also conversely been reported that the crowd had brought a witch doctor with them from Yendi who stated he found no evidence of witchcraft in her home. Denteh's daughter and son attempted to work with Kafaba's chief to prevent further harm or accusations being made against their mother.

The following morning, on 23 July 2020, Denteh was forcibly removed from her home and taken to the central market in Kafaba, where she was allegedly beaten over five hours; videos of the assault show her being hit to the head with various objects, slapped, and whipped, while she states that she is not a witch. Denteh was returned to her home at around 12:00, severely bloodied, where she died a short time later.

== Investigation and trial ==
After Denteh's death, her body was transported to Tamale Teaching Hospital for an autopsy. Videos of her assault went viral on social media, following which the Ghana Police Service announced a 2000 GHS reward for information that led to the location of the assailants. Two women identified in the video, including Sherina Mohammed and Latifa Bumaye, went into hiding, but were located by police officers in Yeji on 3 August 2020. In total, seven people were arrested on charges of conspiracy to commit murder, including Kafaba's chief. All were bailed following a court hearing. Denteh's son called on the police to arrest those who had instigated the assault as well as those who physically took part. The human rights group Occupy Ghana stated that every witness to Denteh's lynching was "guilty of the misdemeanour of being present [and] for not taking any step to prevent the crime".

Mohammed and Bumaye, who were videoed physically assaulting Denteh, initially pleaded not guilty to murder; in April 2023, both changed their pleas to guilty of manslaughter. On 3 July 2023, Mohammed and Bumaye were sentenced to 12 years in prison by Tamale High Court.

== Response ==
=== Ghanaian government ===
Denteh's death triggered outrage in Ghana, particularly after videos of her assault were shared on social media. Jerry Rawlings and John Mahama, both former Presidents of Ghana, condemned the killing, while President Nana Akufo-Addo and First Lady Rebecca Akufo-Addo released a statement describing Denteh's murder as having "disfigured" Ghana. The Economic Fighters League held a vigil on 4 September 2020, where it linked witchcraft accusations to the oppression of women. The Christian Council of Ghana said it was "saddened" by Denteh's death, describing it as an "affront to human dignity". It further condemned some Christian religious leaders for taking part in accusations.

The Coalition Against Witchcraft Accusations, a network of Ghanaian non-governmental organisations, began campaigning for the government to pass legislation formally criminalising witchcraft accusations. In 2023, Francis-Xavier Kojo Sosu, the member of parliament for Madina, introduced a private members' bill in the Parliament of Ghana which made accusing someone of witchcraft illegal, as well as implementing protective mechanisms to support people accused of being witches, as well as offering them the right to seek justice and compensation.

The Anti-Witchcraft Accusations Bill was passed by parliament in July 2023, where it was described as aiming to "address the unfortunate beliefs and thinking in some communities that make Madam Akua Denteh's case possible". In December 2023, Akufo-Addo declined to sign the bill into law; his rationale was that the legislation raised "constitutional concerns" due to it being introduced to parliament as a private members bill, as opposed to a government-sponsored one.

=== Human rights groups ===
Denteh's death, and the subsequent failure by successive Ghanaian governments to pass legislation criminalising witchcraft, has been much lamented by national and international human rights groups. In July 2025, to mark the fifth anniversary of Denteh's death, the Sanneh Institute, ActionAid Ghana, and the Commission on Human Rights and Administrative Justice held an event at Christ the King International School in Accra, where they called for "urgent action" to be taken to protect women from witchcraft accusations and mob violence, as well as for the government to expedite a second passing of the Anti-Witchcraft Accusations Bill. Agnes Naa Momo Lartey, the Minister of Women and Children's Affairs, gave a speech on behalf of the Vice President, Jane Naana Opoku-Agyemang, in which Denteh's death was described as a "national tragedy" that demonstrated "deep-rooted discrimination and violence" faced by older women in Ghana; in the speech, she also reaffirmed President Mahama's intent to pass the bill. The event was followed by a short march in Denteh's memory which was attended by her son Salaami.

In 2026, to mark six years since Denteh's death, Amnesty International accused Ghanaian authorities of having failed to protect victims of witchcraft accusations by having still not passed the Anti-Witchcraft Accusations Bill. It also highlighted that work needed to be done to address commonly-held superstitions and stereotypes linked to people accused of being witches. This was echoed by Nigerian human rights activist Leo Igwe, who blamed such superstitions as continuing the prevalence in belief in witchcraft in northern Ghana. Concern had been shared at the decision to close witch camps without offering any legal protections to their residents; Denteh's son Salaami shared his "anxiety" about the delay of the bill.

Amnesty International Ghana stated that the passing of the bill would strengthen human rights protection in Ghana and bring it closer in line with international human rights standards. The Sanneh Institute suggested delays in passing anti-witchcraft accusation legislation was due to concerns by some tribal chiefs and religious leaders of alienating their constituents, or due to their own beliefs in witchcraft.
