= Disability in Togo =

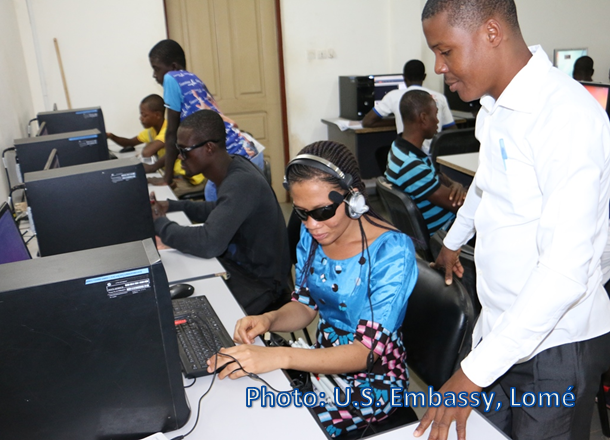
Students with disabilities taking CISTEM courses at the United States Embassy in Lome, Togo in October 2015.

People with disabilities in Togo face many unique challenges. Disability in Togo is often seen as a curse or sign of witchcraft, leading to poor outcomes for people with disabilities. Accessibility in the country is lacking. However, Togo has signed onto the UN Convention on the Rights of Persons with Disabilities and has created plans to encourage greater inclusion for people with disabilities in the country.

== Demographics ==
Census data from 2010 shows that approximately 1.36% of the population of Togo has a disability of some type. Like many other countries in Africa, children in Togo often become disabled due to various complications, disease, poor diet and other causes.

== Cultural attitudes towards disability ==
Children who are born with a disability in Togo, like in some other West African countries, can face violence at home, school or from other members of the community. Disability is seen as a sign of witchcraft and is considered taboo by some communities. Other times, the disability is considered the "result of a demon in the family." Children with disabilities might also face neglect at home. Children born with a physical disability are viewed as "a non-human spirit," by some families. Some parents deliberately keep their children out of school to protect them from abuse there. People with disabilities in Togo in general were considered cursed and that the disability could be contagious. Violence against children with disabilities and their deaths often goes unreported to authorities. Often entire families are ostracized because of one family members' disability.

People with mental disabilities in Togo may be chained up in places known as prayer camps. These camps are religious institutions where individuals are restrained, not given psychiatric help and are prayed over in an attempt to heal the individuals. In Togo, there are several prayer camps which use different methods, often based on the camp's head pastors' personality.

== Policy ==
There is a lack of inclusion for people with disabilities in leadership positions in Togo. In 2013, Jérémie Yao Vidja, who is visually impaired, became the first person with a disability to run for elected office in Togo and he was later elected to the Togolese National Assembly.

The government in Togo signed on to the UN Convention on the Rights of Persons with Disabilities in 2011. In 2016, Togo's Ministry of Social Action created a committee dedicated to "fostering social inclusion for people with disabilities." In 2017, Universal Health Coverage was given to all students living in Togo.

=== Infrastructure ===
Togo's public buildings are still not fully accommodating to people with physical disabilities. In addition, there is no legislation requiring accessibility in public areas.

=== Education ===
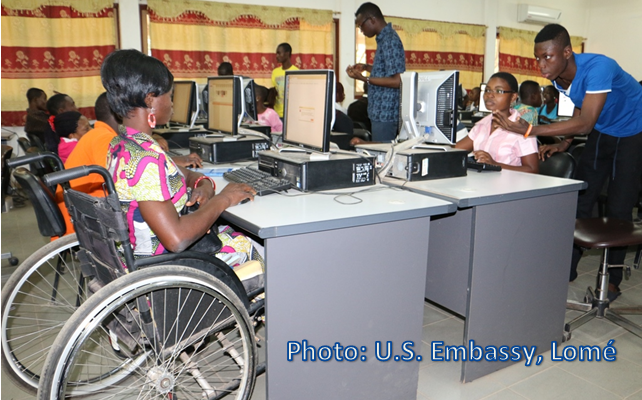
Students with disabilities taking CISTEM courses at the United States Embassy in Lome, Togo in October 2015.

People with disabilities were first allowed to attend public schools in the 1970s. Also in the 1970s, German and American charities set up special-needs schools, focusing on students with visual impairment. By 2014, there were nine schools and centers for children with intellectual disabilities, with most located in Lomé. Also by 2014, schools for those with hearing impairment had been created.

Efforts at including students with disabilities has started to increase. In 2014, there were hundreds of students with various physical disabilities were enrolled in universities around Togo, including 27 visually impaired students at the University of Lomé.

=== Non governmental organizations ===
Non governmental organizations recognize that they need to work closely with the Ministry of Health and the Ministry of Education in Togo. Humanity & Inclusion (HI), started a trial program in Togo and other African countries to help produce 3D-printed prosthetic limbs for amputees in need.

== Disability culture ==
=== Sports ===
Participating in sports among people with disabilities is increasing, with hundreds participating in various trials in 2013 leading up to the pan-African competitions. Togo sent a Paralympic athlete, Aliou Bawa, to the 2016 Summer Paralympics.
