= Mystic Twins =

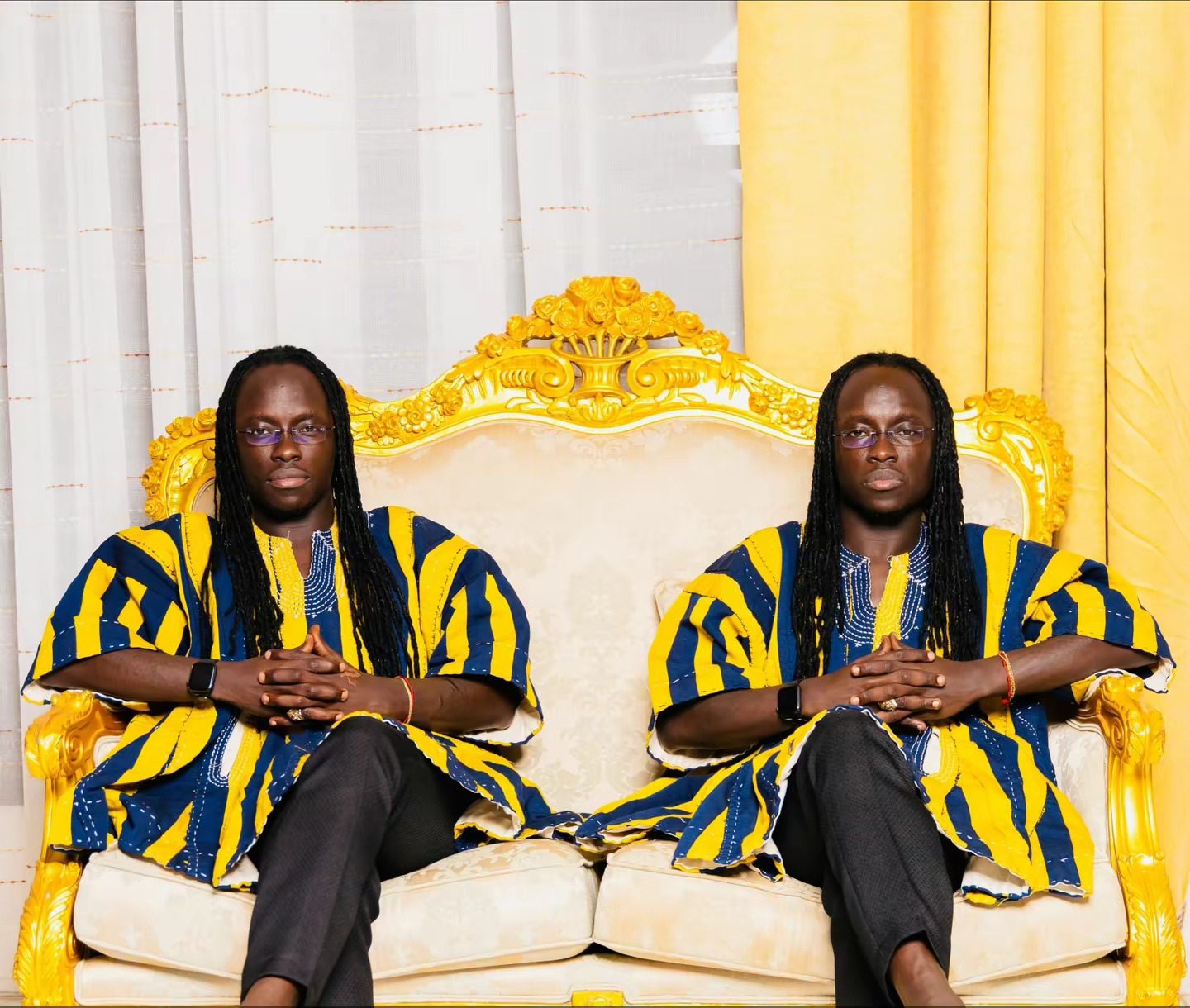
- Born: Nana Akwasi Agyemang Panyin; Nana Akwasi Agyemang Kakra; Manhyia, Kumasi, Ghana
- Occupations: Spiritual figures, media personalities
- Known for: Mysticism, spiritual teachings, podcast hosting

Nana Akwasi Agyemang Panyin and Nana Akwasi Agyemang Kakra, collectively known as the Mystic Twins (McMaine and McKenzie), are Ghanaian spiritual figures and life coaches. The twins identify as "last-born princes" of the Denkyira Kingdom, a title they state reflects their cultural and ancestral heritage.

== Career ==
The Mystic Twins describe their work as focusing on spirituality, mysticism and ancestral Ghanaian traditions. They use online platforms to discuss dream interpretation, spirituality and related topics.

They visited the GA Mantse King Tackie Teiko Tsuru II Palace and expressed their desire to collaborate with the Ga Traditional Council on future initiatives.

== Podcast ==
The Mystic Twins are hosts of the Kasa Preko Podcast, a Ghanaian podcast focused on spirituality, indigenous beliefs, culture, and personal development.

The first season was directed by filmmaker Kofi Asamoah. Guests included Kwaku Manu, Funny Face, and Nana Agyakoma Difie II (Asante Mampong Hemaa).

== Philanthropy ==
The Mystic Twins have donated food, toiletries and other items to orphanages and disadvantaged communities in Ghana, including Potter's Village Orphanage in Accra and Nipa Hia Mmoa Orphanage in Kumasi.

In 2026, the Mystic Twins Foundation organised an outreach programme at the Gambaga settlement in the North East Region, donating items to women residing there.

In May 2026, the foundation visited the Korle-Bu Teaching Hospital where they covered medical expenses of 30 mothers.

== Controversy ==
In August 2020, the Mystic Twins were challenged by Rev. Abbeam Danso and Apostle Nkum to demonstrate their claimed spiritual abilities on GHOne TV’s *Revelations* program. The twins declined, citing biblical principles and questioning the motives of some religious leaders. The exchange was subsequently reported by several Ghanaian media outlets.
