= The Art of Ama Ata Aidoo =

- Directed by: Yaba Badoe
- Written by: Yaba Badoe
- Release date: 2014
- Country: Ghana

The Art of Ama Ata Aidoo is a 2014 Ghanaian documentary written and directed by Yaba Badoe.

== Plot ==
The documentary film gives insight of the life of playwright and novelist Ama Ata Aidoo, coming to a homeland to empower woman despite the challenges they face.

== Cast ==
Ama Ata Aidoo
