= Amina Mama =

Nigerian-British writer, feminist and academic (born 1958)

- Occupations: Writer, activist and academic

Education
- Education: University of St. Andrews; London School of Economics and Political Science

Philosophical work
- School: feminism, postcolonialism
- Institutions: University of California, Davis, Mills College; Birkbeck College, University of London
- Main interests: Gender, feminism, higher education, militarism, neoliberalism, Africa

Amina Mama is a Nigerian-British writer, activist and academic. Her main areas of focus have been post-colonial, militarist and gender issues. She has lived in Africa, Europe and North America, and worked to bridge the gap between feminists and related movements across the globe.

== Background ==
Amina Mama was born in a mixed-race household. She was born in Kaduna, Nigeria. Her father is Nigerian and her mother is English. Her ancestral roots on her paternal side trace back to Bida. Several members of Mama's family were involved in the development of the post-colonial local educational system.

== Education ==
Mama moved to the United Kingdom and attained a Bachelor of Science in Psychology at the University of St. Andrews, Scotland in 1979, a Master of Science in Social Psychology at the London School of Economics and Political Science, University of London in 1981 and a doctorate in organizational psychology at Birkbeck College, University of London in 1987. Her thesis was titled "Race and Subjectivity: A Study of Black Women".

== Career ==
After graduating in 1979, Mama worked as an independent consultant, giving policy advice to international agencies such as the United Nations, the Government of Sweden, the Government of the Netherlands, and the UK Department of International Development.

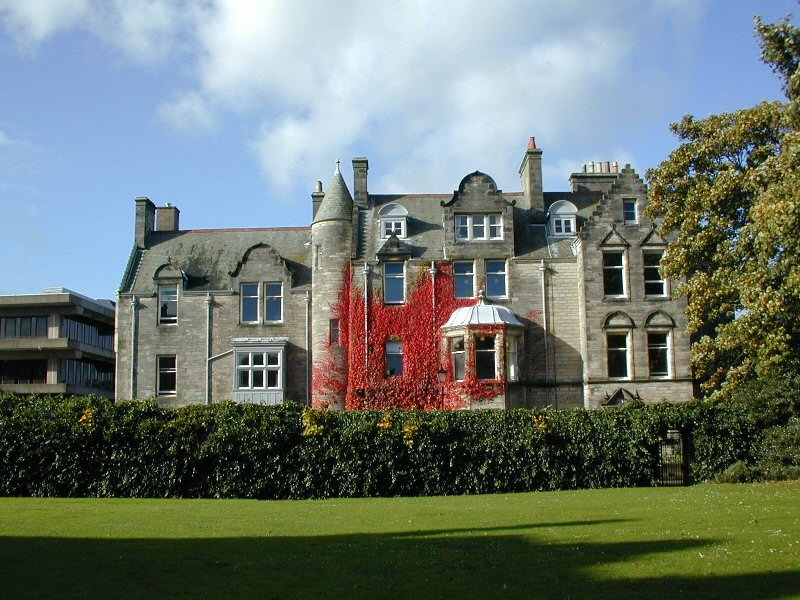
University of St. Andrews in Scotland where Mama received her first degree

Some of her early work involves comparing the situations of British and Nigerian women. She moved to the Netherlands and then back to Nigeria, only to encounter more upheaval in 2000. Then she moved to South Africa, where she began to work at the University of Cape Town (UCT). At UCT, she became the director of the African Gender Institute and co-founded Feminist Africa, which is the first continental journal of gender studies and activism.

In 2008, Mama accepted a position at Mills College in Oakland, California. After moving, she commented, "I have learned America isn't just a big, bad source of imperialism." She was appointed the Barbara Lee Distinguished Chair in Women's Leadership at Mills, and co-taught a class called "Real Policy, Real Politics" with Congresswoman Lee on topics concerning African and African-American women, including gender roles, poverty, HIV/AIDS, and militarism. In 2010, she was appointed Chair of the Department of Gender and Women Studies at the University of California, Davis.

Mama was the chair of the board of directors for the Global Fund for Women, and continues to advise several other international organizations. She has sat on the board of directors of the United Nations Research Institute for Social Development and serves on the advisory board for the feminist academic journals Meridians and Signs.

Between 2020 and 2022, Mama served the Kwame Nkrumah Chair in African Studies, which is situated in Institute of African Studies at the University of Ghana.

One of her best known works is Beyond the Masks: Race, Gender and Subjectivity. She is also involved in film work. In 2010, she co-produced the movie The Witches of Gambaga with Yaba Badoe.

Currently she works as a professor in the Department of Gender, Sexuality and Women's Studies at the University of California, Davis. She has worked there since 2010.

== Thought ==
Mama describes herself as a feminist and not a womanist, arguing that feminism originates in Africa and that white feminism "has never been strong enough to be 'enemy'—in the way that, say, global capitalism can be viewed as an enemy." She has criticised discourses of women in development for stripping gender studies of politically meaningful feminism. She has also argued that African universities continue to show entrenched patriarchy, in terms of both interpersonal sexism and institutional gender gaps.

A primary area of interest for Mama has been gender identity as it relates to global militarism. She is an outspoken critic of AFRICOM, which she describes as part of violent neocolonial resource extraction.

== Publications ==
- The Hidden Struggle: Statutory and Voluntary Sector Responses to Violence Against Black Women in the Home. Runnymede, 1989; republished by Whiting and Birch, 1996. ISBN 9781861770059
- "Black Women and the Police: A Place Where the Law is Not Upheld", in Inside Babylon: The Caribbean Diaspora in Britain, ed. Winston James and Clive Harris. London: Verso, 1993. ISBN 9780860914716.
- Beyond the Masks: Race, Gender, and Subjectivity. New York: Routledge, 1995. ISBN 9780415035446.
- National Machinery for Women in Africa: Towards an analysis. Third World Network, 2000. ISBN 9789988602017.
- "Is It Ethical to Study Africa? Preliminary Thoughts on Scholarship and Freedom". African Studies Review 50 (1), April 2007.
- Mama, A. (2011). "What Does it Mean to Do Feminist Research in African Contexts?" Feminist Review, 98(1_suppl), e4-e20. https://doi.org/10.1057/fr.2011.22 (Original work published 2011)
