= Spirit children =

Traditional belief about disabled children common in some parts of sub-Saharan Africa

Spirit child is a Ghanaian term for a disabled child who is believed to possess magical powers that cause misfortune. Disability in Ghana is greatly stigmatized and very often the only way considered socially acceptable to treat disabled children is to kill or exorcize them with the assistance of a witchdoctor. Spirit children are referred to as chichuru or kinkiriko in the former Kassena-Nankana district of Northern Ghana. These children primarily come from poor, rural areas. However, if a spirit child is found to be "good" there are no punishments for the child or their family.

Similar concepts and rituals include the "witch babies" of Benin, the "snake children" of Mali and the Ivory Coast, and the "mingi children" of Tanzania".

== Causes ==
=== Physical characteristics ===
Birth abnormalities that spirit children exhibit are large or small heads, spina bifida, hydrocephalus, premature teeth and broken or deformed limbs. A spirit child may also be blamed on a crop failure or the death of village livestock. Intentional killing of a totem animal is thought to cause the spirit of said animal to jump into a human host.

=== Disabilities and illnesses ===
Spirit children often have disabilities or other chronic illnesses. If the mother is sick during pregnancy, the child may also perceived to be a spirit child. If a child refuses to eat, they may also be a spirit child. This "refusal to thrive" indicates that the child may be a harmful spirit. Families fear their child as there is little information about modern childcare accessible to them and believe that the child will eventually destroy the family's home.

=== Religious beliefs ===
It is believed that women can attract a harmful spirit if they walk while they eat. Supposedly, these harmful spirits are attracted to human food and will enter and impregnate the woman's womb. Other actions that attract harmful spirits include "using unapproved entrances and exits to a house", washing another woman's calabashes at the riverside, and bathing at night. Many regard series of stillbirths in a village to be the same spirit child returning. When this occurs, the most recent stillborn is mutilated by the villagers so that the same child cannot return.

=== Community Aspects ===
Members of the community describe spirit children as "impulsive, wise, crafty, and mischievous." Community members also note that the spirit children often have malnutrition syndromes. Among all the ethnic groups found in Ghana, women are more likely than men to have witchcraft beliefs.

Indeed, strong animistic religious beliefs combined with food insecurity encourage these practices. It is commonly believed that spirit children do not deserve a place among humans. This strong religious belief of infant alterity explains the cultural psychodynamics of parents killing their children.

== Explanation of the ritual ==
=== Preparing the concoction ===
Spirit children are treated by "concoction men". The family seeks out a "concoction man" to treat the spirit child using a "dongo" (a sacred cup made from animal horn). The men will also prepare a tea (the "concoction") with a root known as "bunbunlia". Inside of the dongo, there is a "black medicine" that the men add to the tea. The black medicine is composed of various burned plant parts that are mixed with shea butter.

=== Administering the concoction ===
An elder woman in the child's family administers the "concoction" (which may or may not contain toxic substances) to the alleged spirit child. If the child dies, the "concoction man" wraps it in an old sleeping mat, disposes of the body in the forest/bush, and conducts a ceremony to ensure that the harmful spirits do not return. The "dongo" and "concoction" are said to send the spirit back to the bush as spirit children are believed to be harmful nature spirits that impersonate humans. Other sources say that the dead child returns to the world of their ancestors.

== Government response ==
The tradition was criminalized in Ghana in 2013, yet is still widely practiced due to the lack of birth registration. One study suggested that between 22 and 27% of infant mortalities are attributable to the spirit children tradition. A study conducted by the University of Alberta Ethics Review Board and the NHRC Institutional Review Board, found that 36% of spirit children deaths are due to natural causes, rather than by intentional means. Rights of the child are not guaranteed without a birth certificate since they are not legally registered.

Ghana passed the Registration of Births and Deaths Act of 1965 requiring all births and deaths to be registered. Its goal is to "provide accurate and reliable information on all births and deaths occurring within Ghana for socio-economic development of the country through their registration and certification". Birth registration still remains a problem since rural areas since there are less resources and labor force availability in rural areas. According to information from 2014 Ghana Demographic and Health Survey, the births of 28.89% children in Ghana have never been registered. This rate is the lowest among children born to young mothers, those without formal education and mothers living in rural areas.

== Advocacy ==
In 1991, Ben Okri published the novel The Famished Road. This book brought attention to the practice of killing spirit children. In 2013, Anas Aremeyaw Anas, an undercover reporter set out to find the people responsible for the practices. Christianization also has helped limit the occurrence of this practice

AfriKids is a child rights Non-governmental organization that has created education programs about the practice of spirit children. Since 2002, AfriKids has ended the practices in 58 communities and preventing about 243 deaths. Joe Asakibeem works with AfriKids. Concoction men, mothers and elderly women in the child's family are given payments from AfriKids for them to stop the practice.

== See also ==
- Persecution of people with albinism
- Changeling
- Kassena-Nankana District
- Prayer camps
- The Famished Road
