= Northern Territories of the Gold Coast =

British protectorate in West Africa between 1901 and 1957

- 1902–1957
- Flag of the United Kingdom Coat of arms
- Anthem: God Save the King (1902–1952); God Save the Queen (1952–1957)
- Map of the Gold Coast Colony, the Ashanti Colony, the Northern Territories and the mandate territory of British Togoland
- Status: British protectorate
- Capital: Gambaga
- Common languages: English (official), Dagbani (official)
- Monarch
- Chief Commissioner
  - 1897-1899: Henry Ponting Northcott
  - 1954-1957: Sydney MacDonald-Smith
- History
  - Established: 1 January 1902
  - Annexed to form part of Her Majesty's dominions as part of Ghana: 6 March 1957
- Currency: Gold Coast ackey British West African pound
Preceded by	Succeeded by
British Empire	British Empire; Dominion of Ghana
- Today part of: Ghana

The Northern Territories of the Gold Coast, commonly known as the Northern Territories, was a British protectorate in Africa from 1901 until 1957. The protectorate was administered by the Governor of the Gold Coast under a Chief Commissioner residing at Gambaga. A number of treaties were concluded in the name of Her Britannic Majesty with the Chiefs of Bona, Dagarti, Wa and Mamprusi at Gambaga. These treaties were made in 1896. Under the treaties, the Chiefs agreed not to conclude treaties with any other Power or to cede territory or to accept protectorates without the consent of Her Britannic Majesty. The Northern Territories were constituted as a district in 1897. The Northern Territories were formally established as a protectorate in 1901 under the Northern Territories Order in Council 1901 made on 26 September 1901. The Northern Territories remained a protectorate until the Ghana Independence Act 1957 annexed the Northern Territories by providing that the territories included immediately before 6 March 1957 in the Gold Coast should, as from that day, form part of Her Majesty's dominions by the name of Ghana.
