= Paulina Mefia Denteh =

Ghanaian doctor and public health advocate

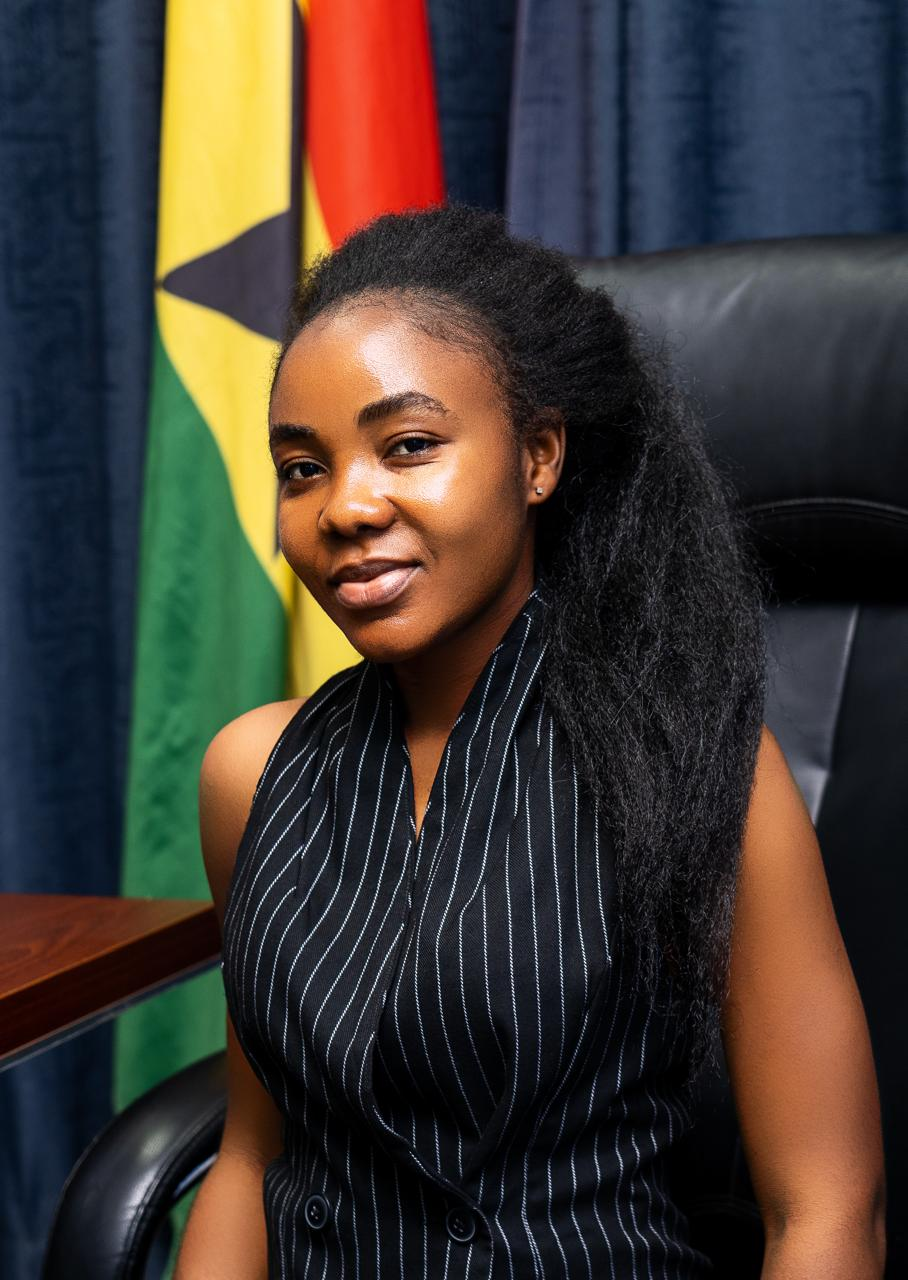
- Denteh in 2024
- Born: March 5, 1996 (age 30); Ghana
- Education: Methodist Girls’ Senior High School, Mamfe
- Alma mater: Yaroslav-the-Wise Novgorod State University
- Occupations: Medical doctor, public health advocate
- Years active: 2024–present
- Employer(s): Health Community of West Africa Association; Essence Clinic
- Organization: Remedy Foundation
- Known for: Women’s health advocacy; community health education; Red Diploma distinction
- Notable work: Public health advocacy and outreach programmes
- Title: Director for Women’s Health and Wellness; Deputy Director, Essence Clinic

Paulina Mefia Denteh (born 5 March 1996) is a Ghanaian medical doctor and public health advocate known for her work in women's health education and community health initiatives in West Africa. She serves as the Director for Women's Health and Wellness at the Health Community of West Africa Association and as Deputy Director at Essence Clinic.

== Early life and education ==
Denteh was born in Ghana. She attended Methodist Girls’ Senior High School in Mamfe, where she pursued her secondary education.

She later studied medicine at Yaroslav-the-Wise Novgorod State University in Russia. As part of her academic preparation, she completed a Russian language programme prior to commencing her medical training. She graduated with a Doctor of Medicine (MD) degree. During her medical studies, she worked as a Teaching Assistant at Yaroslav-the-Wise Novgorod State University, supporting academic activities and student learning.

She was awarded a "Red Diploma with Distinction," an academic classification given for high academic performance in Russian universities.

== Career ==
Following her medical training, Denteh has worked across clinical practice and public health advocacy.

She serves as Director for Women's Health and Wellness at the Health Community of West Africa Association, where her work focuses on promoting women's health awareness, preventive healthcare, and community-based education. She also holds the position of Deputy Director at Essence Clinic, contributing to healthcare service delivery and health promotion initiatives.

== Advocacy and public engagement ==
Denteh has been involved in public health advocacy through media engagements, outreach programmes, and educational initiatives. Her work includes participation in discussions on disease awareness, healthcare access, and preventive health strategies.

She has contributed to public health communication through articles and media appearances addressing health issues, including infectious diseases and women's health.

In addition, she has been involved in mentorship initiatives supporting medical students and young professionals across Africa.
