= Gambaga =

District Capital in Northern Region, Ghana

- District Capital
- Location in Ghana
- Coordinates: 10°31′50″N 0°26′32″W
- Country: Ghana
- Region: Northern Region
- District: East Mamprusi District

Gambaga is the capital of the East Mamprusi Municipal Assembly in the North East Region of Ghana. Once a residence of Mamprusi-kings it is still the capital of East Mamprusi Municipal Assembly, a municipality in the North East Region of Ghana. It is home to several ancient Mossi chiefs' gravesites.

From 1901 until 1957 Gambaga served as the capital of the Northern Territories of the Gold Coast, which was a British protectorate and a separate jurisdiction from the Gold Coast.

Gambaga, along with other places in Ghana, is the site of a camp for alleged witches. A 2011 documentary film directed by Yaba Badoe is entitled The Witches of Gambaga.

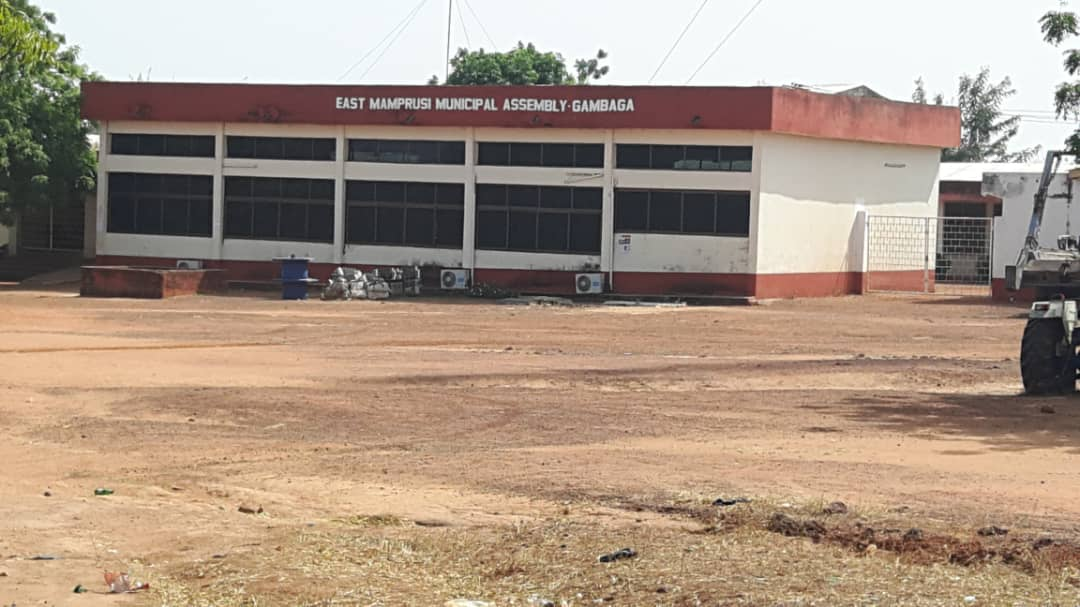
East Mamprusi Municipal Assembly(Gambaga)

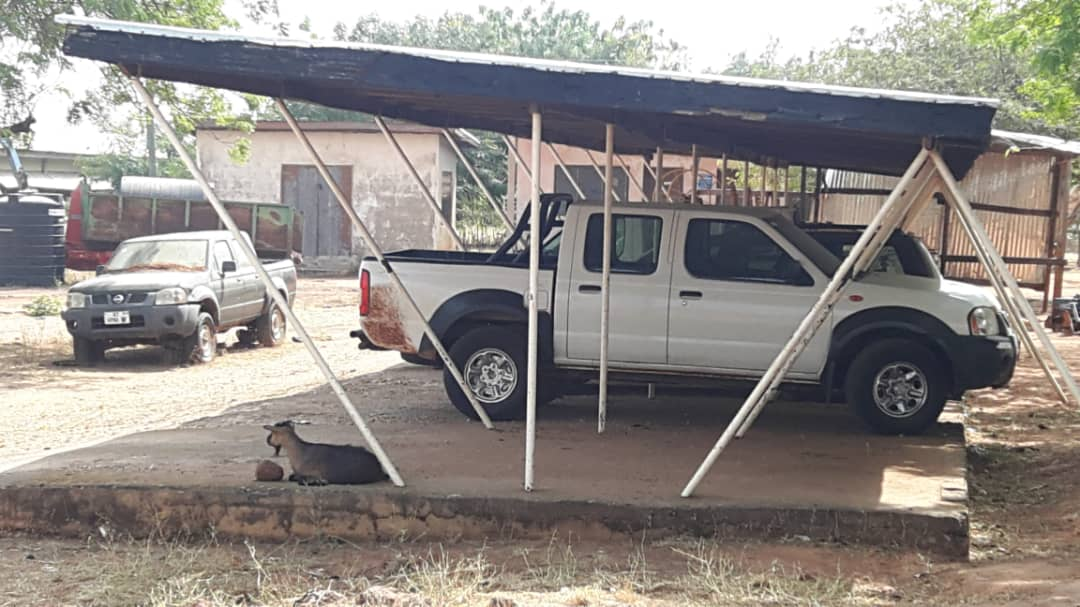
East Mamprusi Municipal Assembly car park (Gambaga)

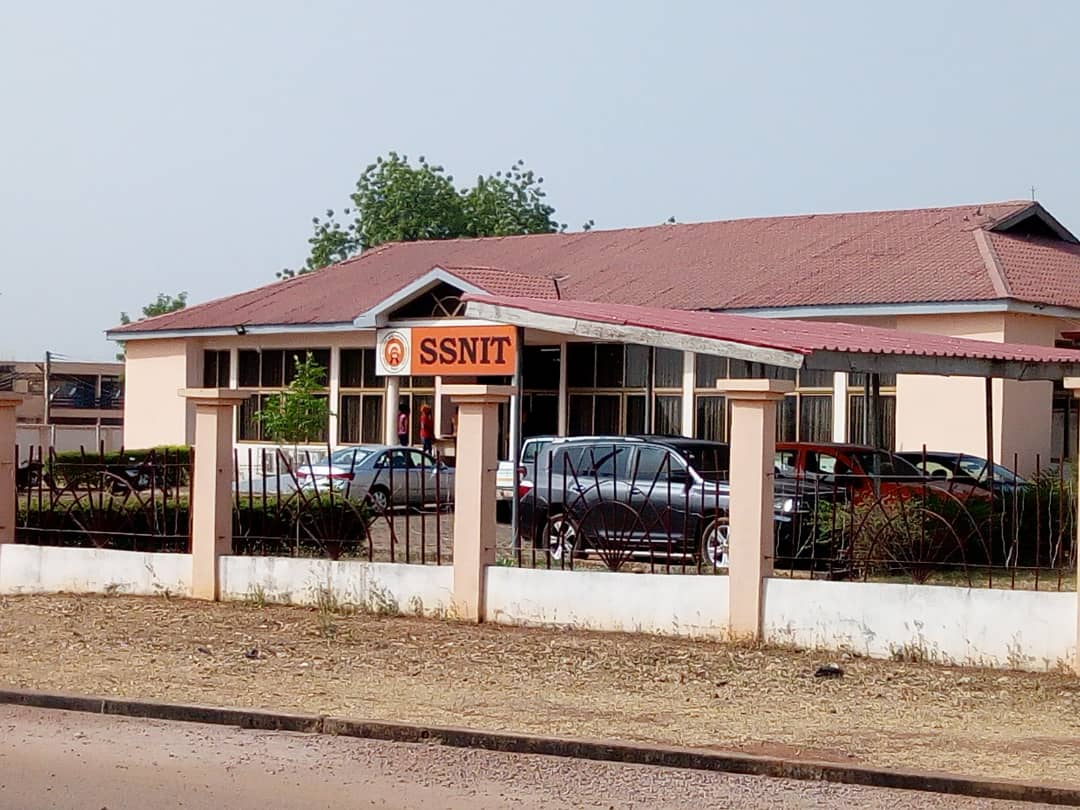
Gambaga SSNIT office (Gambaga).

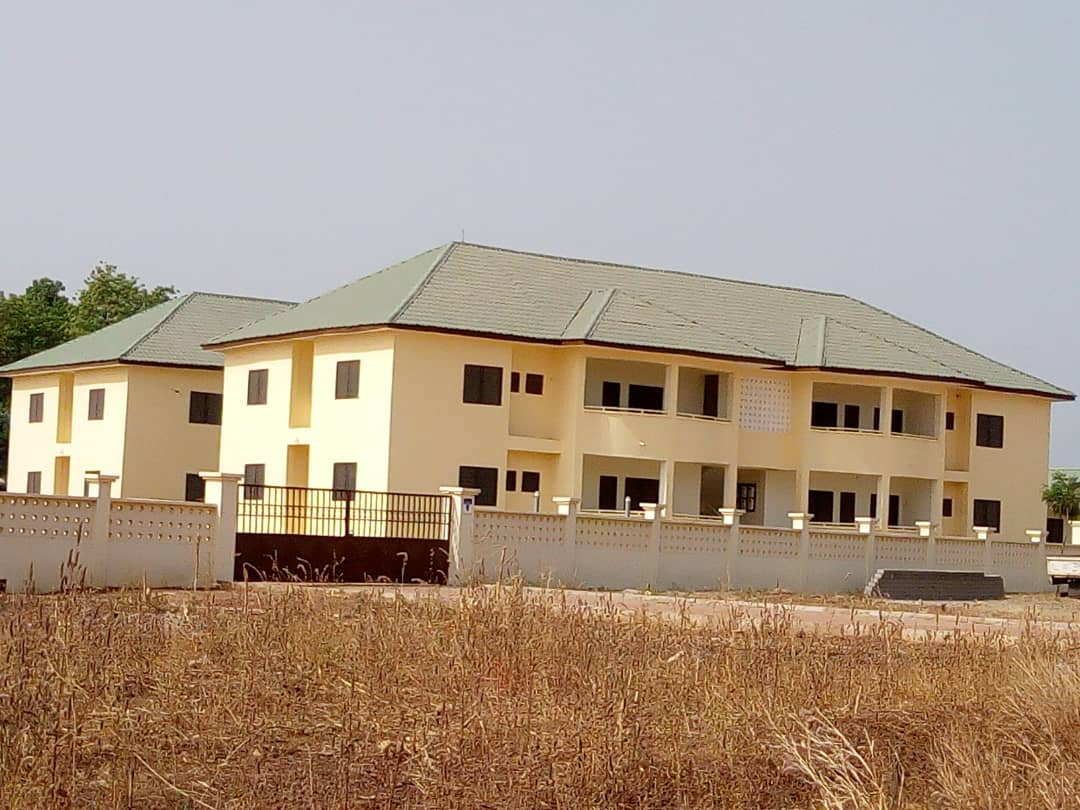
SSNIT flat (Gambaga)

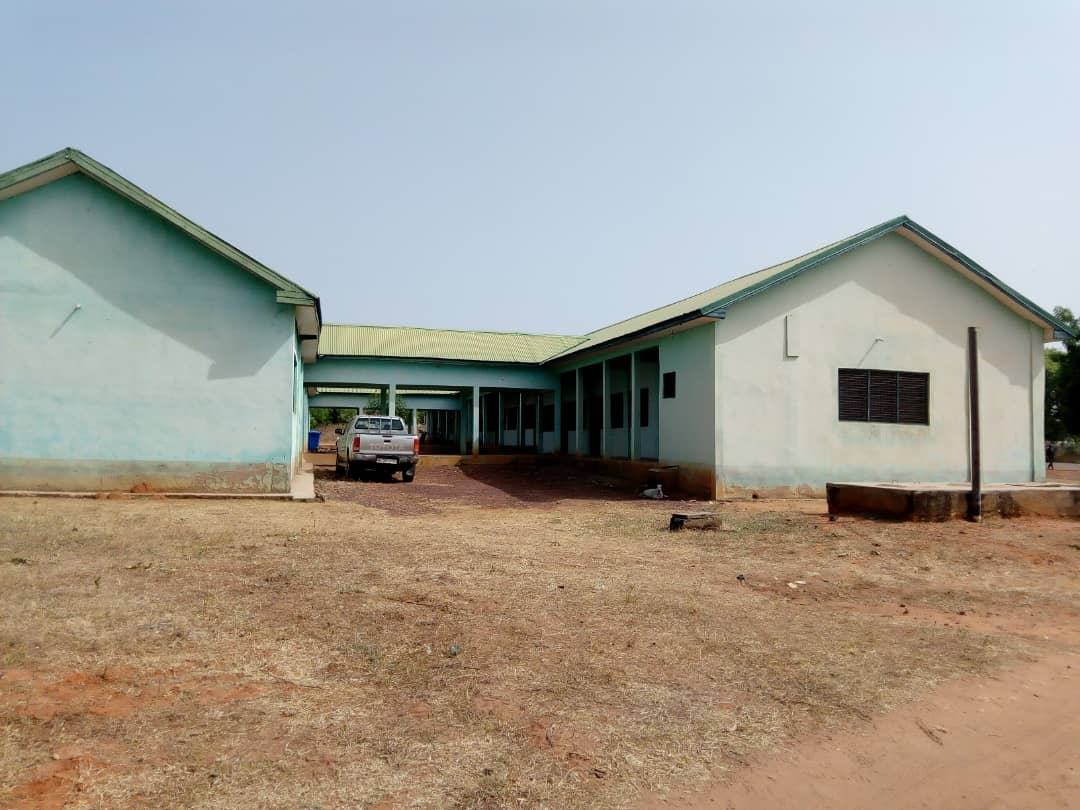
Ghana Education Service (Gambaga)

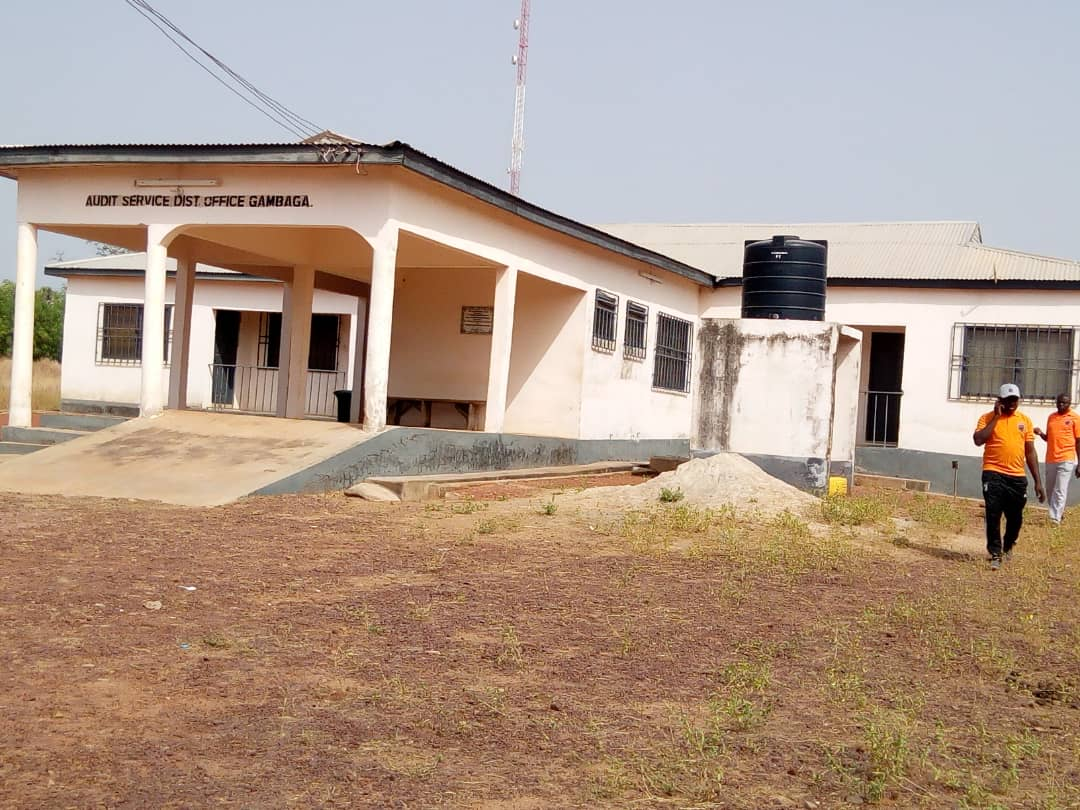
Audit Service (Gambaga)

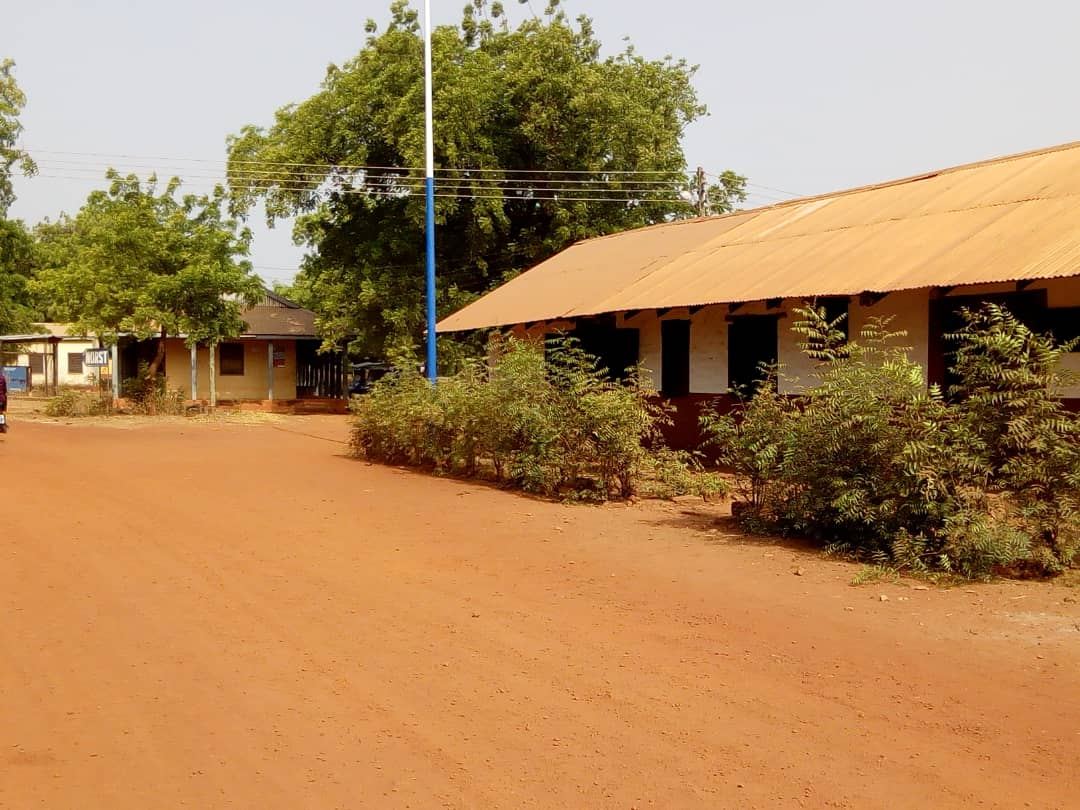
Ghana Prison Service (Gambaga)

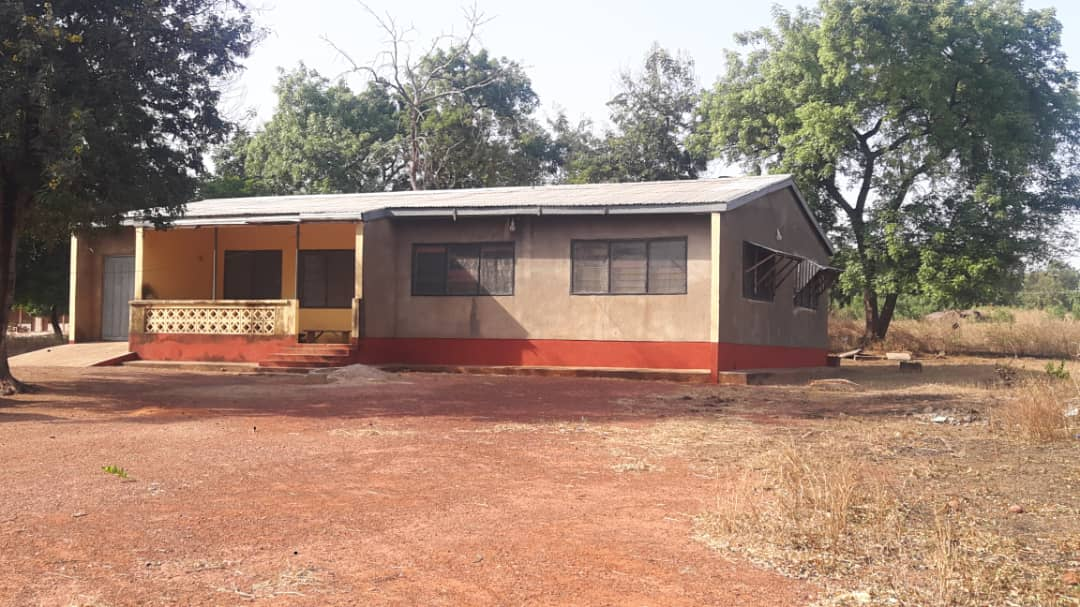
Waders Canteen (Gambaga)

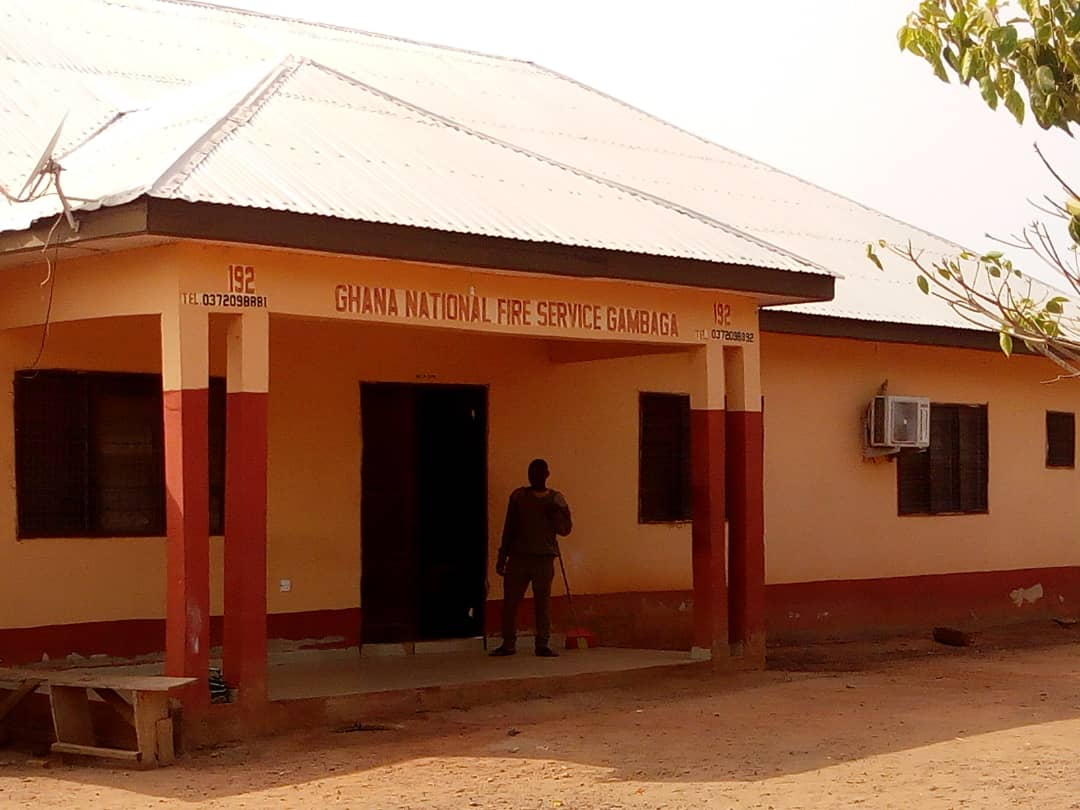
Ghana Fire Service (Gambaga)

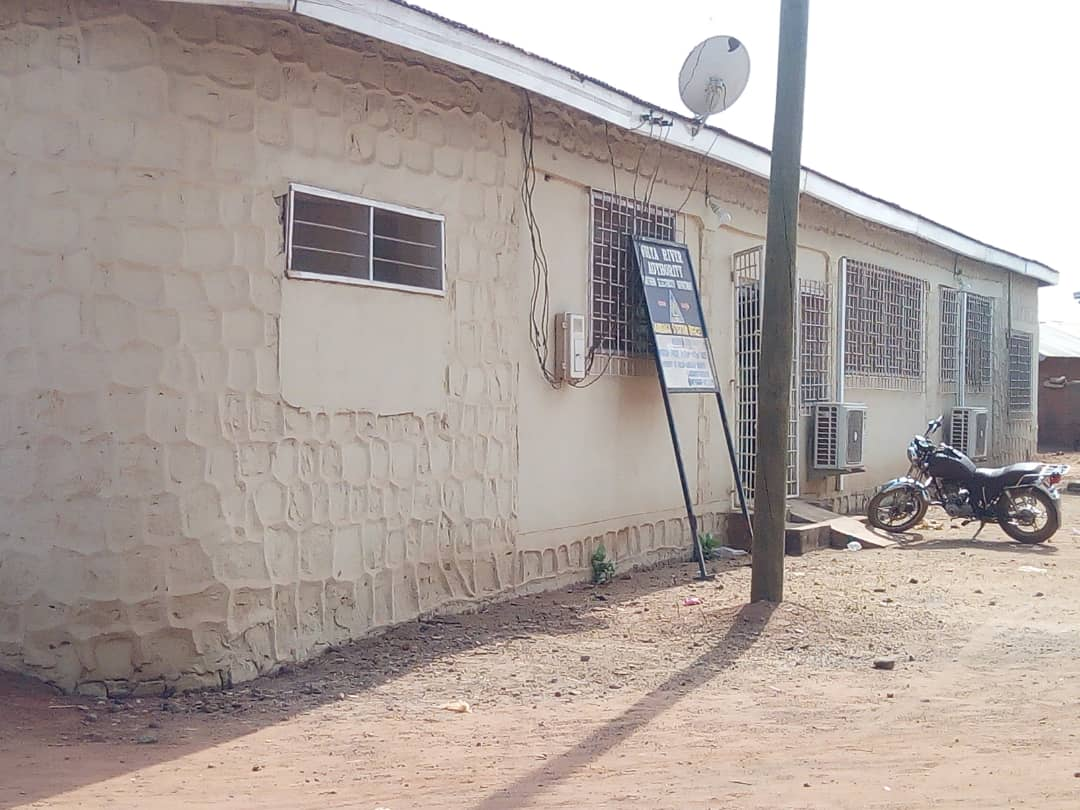
VRA Municipal office Gambaga

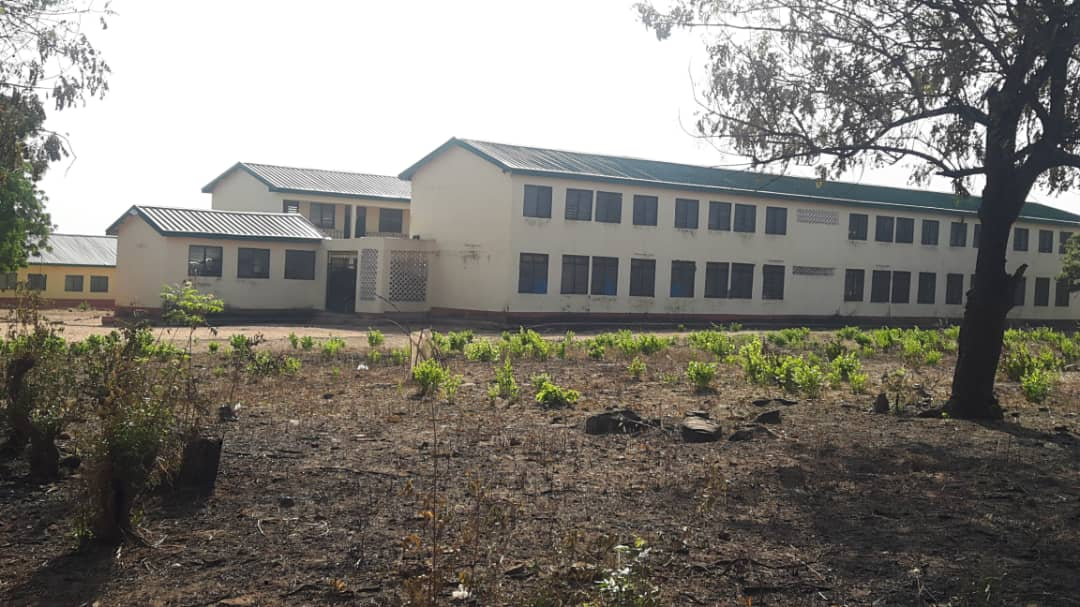
Gambaga Girls Senior High School dormitory

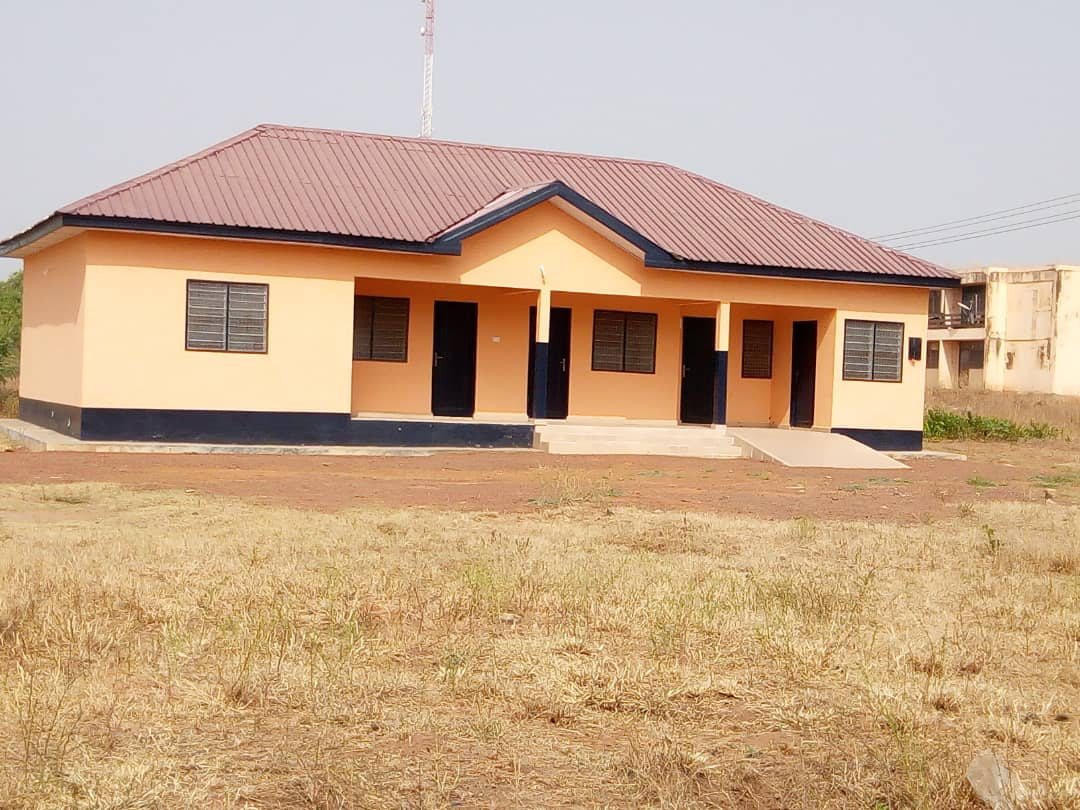
Office of the Divisional Police Command (Gambaga)

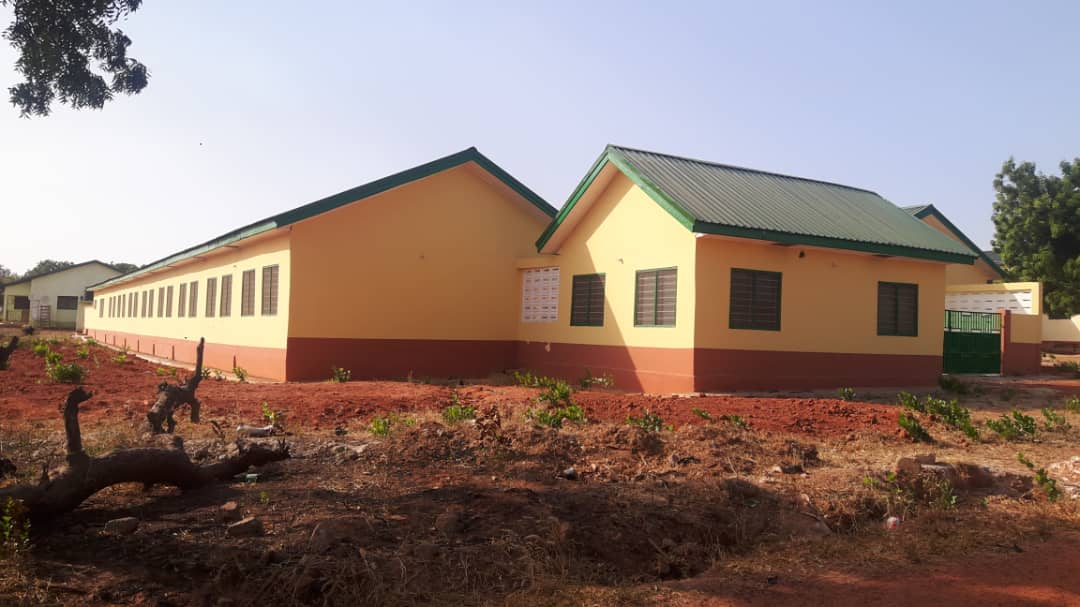
Gambaga Girls Senior High School new dormitory

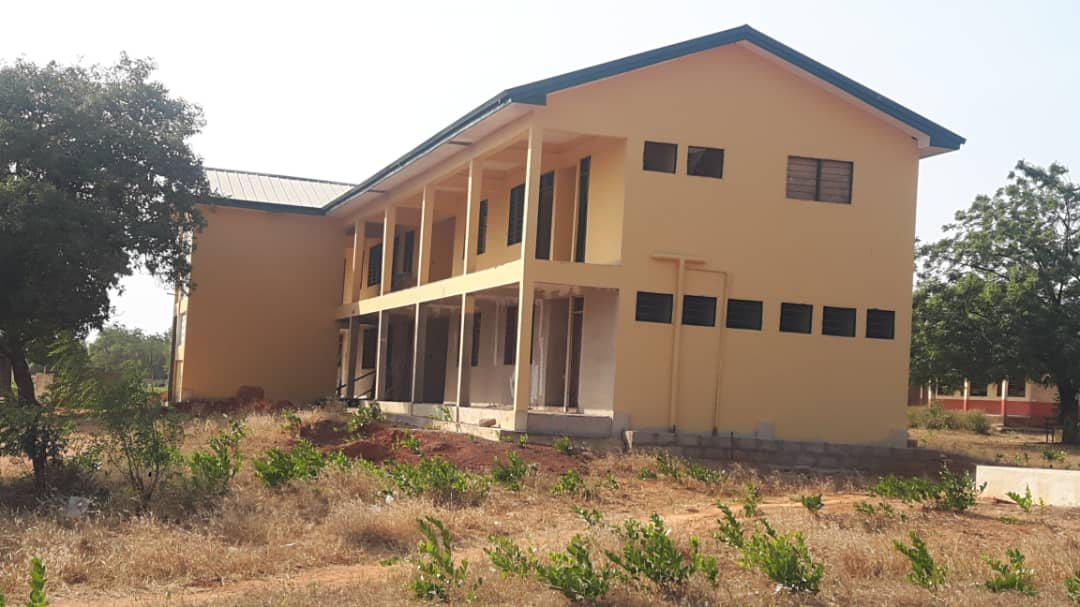
Gambaga Girls Senior High School new administration block

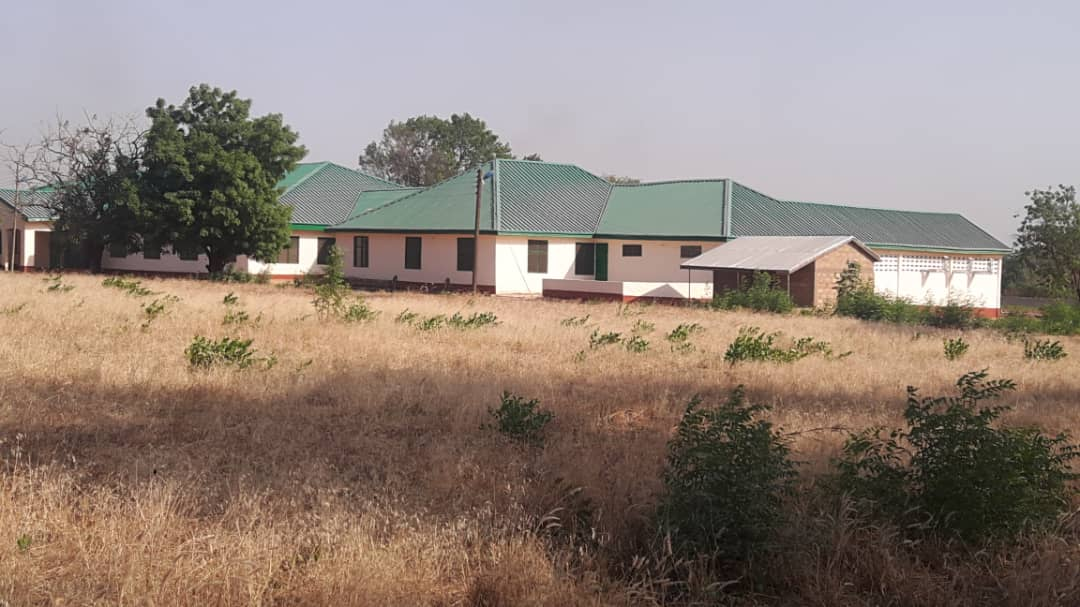
Gambage Girls Senior High School dining hall
