= The Witches of Gambaga =

2011 Ghanaian film

- Directed by: Yaba Badoe
- Produced by: Amina Mama
- Release date: 2011
- Country: Ghana

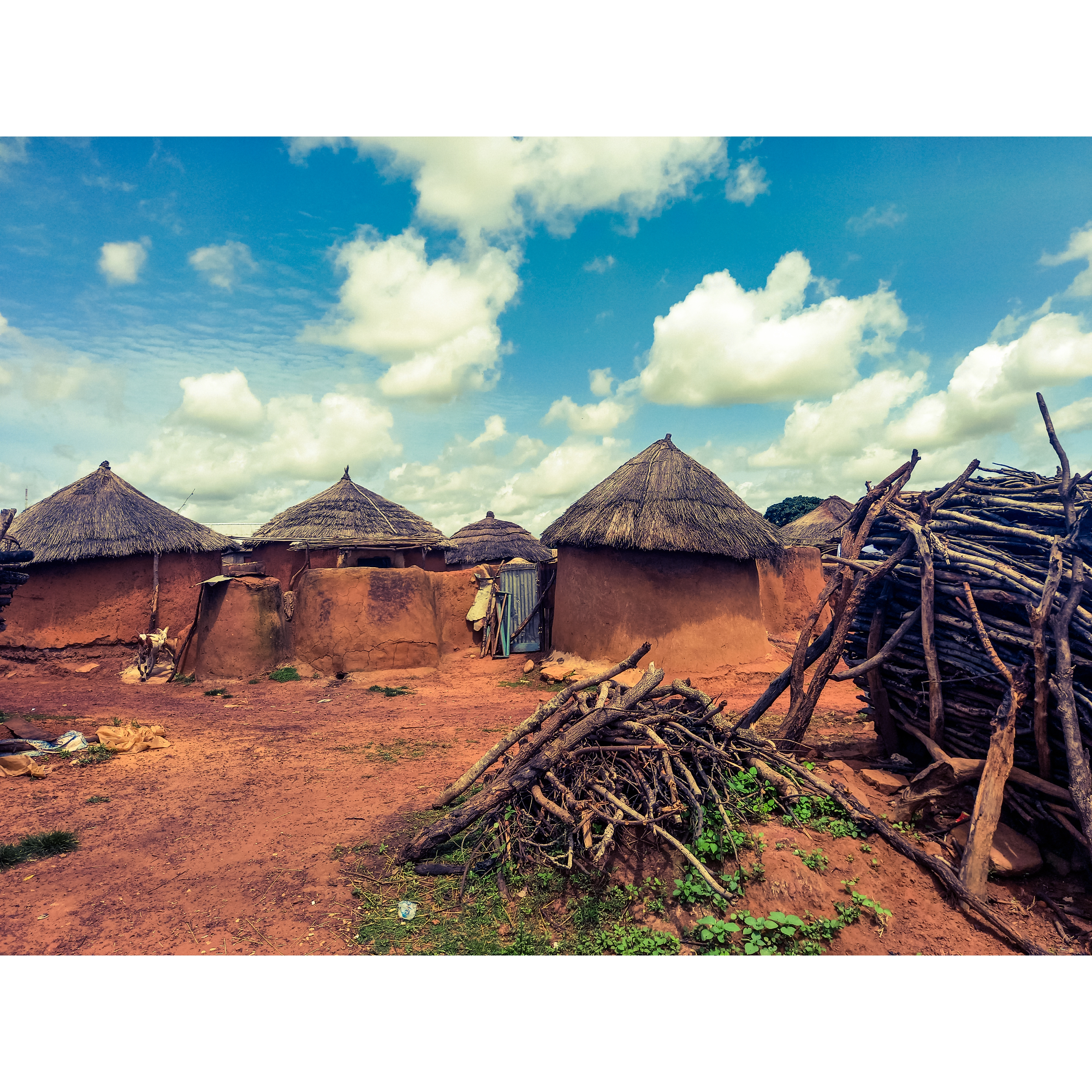
A peak from behind the Gambaga witches camp.

The Witches of Gambaga is a Ghanaian 2011 documentary film directed by Yaba Badoe and produced by Amina Mama.

== Plot ==
Women of various communities are accused of being witches by their families and how they fight the struggle of their society and community in the witch camp.

== History of creation ==
In 2011, the film participated in Rio de Janeiro International Film Festival. In 2012, it was shown at the London Feminist Film Festival.
