= Daniel E. Dawes =

American public health scholar and academic

- Born: Daniel E. Dawes, J.D.
- Known for: Health equity policy; political determinants of health; mental and behavioral health
- Awards: Member, National Academy of Medicine
- Scientific career
- Fields: Public health, health policy, health law
- Workplaces: Meharry Medical College; Morehouse School of Medicine

Daniel E. Dawes, J.D., is a healthcare and public health scholar, health policy expert, educator, and researcher. He serves as professor and founding dean of the School of Global Health at Meharry Medical College, as well as senior vice president of Global Health at the same institution. Previously, he was the executive director of the Satcher Health Leadership Institute and a professor of health law, policy, and management at Morehouse School of Medicine, where he also served as vice president.

== Career and research work ==
Before his academic roles, Dawes worked on health equity initiatives at the American Psychological Association, Premier, Inc., the United States Senate Health, Education, Labor, and Pensions Committee, and the U.S. House of Representatives. He advises policymakers at various levels, as well as think tanks, foundations, corporations, and nonprofit organizations.

His research focuses on health reform, health equity, mental and behavioral health inequities, social and political determinants of health, poverty, and health system transformation. His work has been published in leading academic journals such as the American Journal of Public Health, JAMA, The Lancet, Health Affairs, American Journal of Preventive Medicine, and Oxford University Press. Dawes has also been involved in collaborative efforts like the National COVID-19 Resiliency Network and the Health Equity Leadership & Exchange Network (HELEN).

Dawes played a key role in the development and negotiation of several federal policies, including the Mental Health Parity Act, the Genetic Information Nondiscrimination Act, the Americans with Disabilities Act Amendments Act, and the health equity-focused provisions of the Affordable Care Act. He is an elected member of the National Academy of Medicine in 2021 and a fellow of the New York Academy of Medicine. Additionally, he served as an advisor to The White House COVID-19 Health Equity Task Force and as an appointed member of the Centers for Disease Control and Prevention's advisory committee to the director, where he co-chairs the Health Equity Working Group. Additionally, he is an appointed member of the National Institutes of Health's National Advisory Council for Nursing Research.

== Books ==
- 150 Years of ObamaCare (2016), Johns Hopkins University Press
- The Political Determinants of Health (2020), Johns Hopkins University Press

=== Edited ===
- Health Equity: African Americans and Public Health, American Public Health Association Press.
- Mental Health Equity, Springer Publishing
