= Prayer camps =

Form of alternative medicine in Ghana and Togo

Prayer camps are religious alternative medicine institutions that are used for treatment of a variety of ailments in Ghana, and Togo. Purported treatment methods including beatings, forced starvation and various other forms of torture are commonly used at these facilities.

Ghana is said to be "the most religious society in the world", with 96% of the population identifying with a particular spiritual belief. Mental illness is usually seen as caused by curses or harmful spirits. The only perceived solution to this problem is through various spiritual methods (some of which violate basic human rights), with only minimal medical help being applied, such as through medication being given to patients.

A 2016 Yale University study showed that both prayer camp staff and psychiatric hospital mental health professionals had showed interest in the idea of collaboration. Specifically, prayer camp staff are interested in help with the provision and use of medication, as well as improving the hygiene and infrastructure of prayer camps. However, prayer camp staff are highly opposed to medical explanations of mental illness, instead preferring supernatural explanations, while mental health and medical staff are concerned with the use of torture practices such as chainings. Furthermore, despite the importance of long-term medication use in patient recovery, prayer camp staff usually only endorse medication use over short periods.

== See also ==
- Spirit children
- Witch camp
- Health in Ghana
- Disability in Ghana
