= Disability in Ghana =

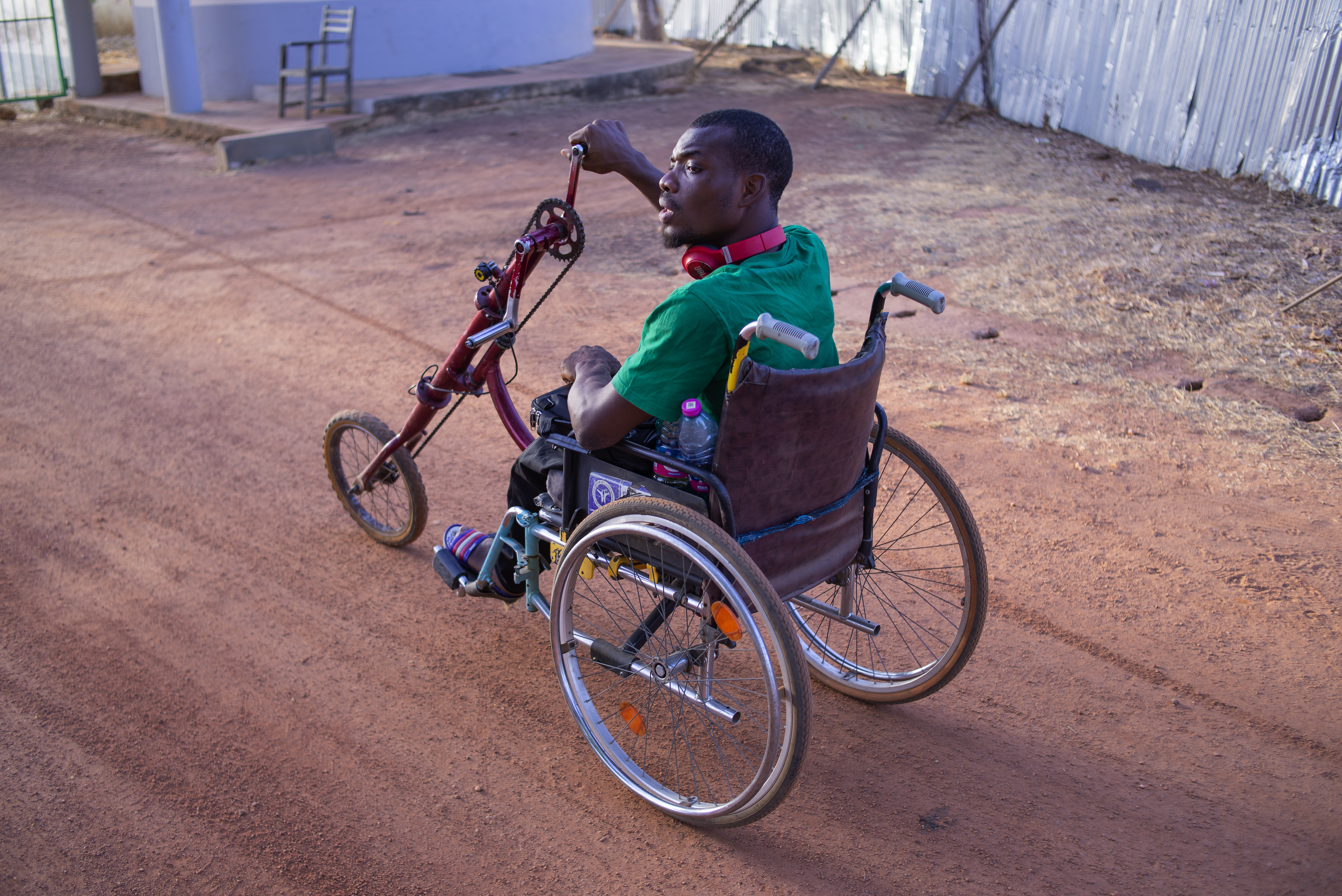
A Ghanaian man in a wheelchair

The Ghana Statistical Service reports from their 2021 census indicate that approximately eight percent (2,098,138 individuals) of the Ghanaian population experience some form of disability, with a higher prevalence among females (8.8%) than males (6.7%). Disabilities are more common in rural areas (9.5%) compared to urban areas (6.5%). Among the six domains of disability, difficulty in seeing is the most widespread, affecting four percent of the population, while difficulty in communicating is the least common, affecting one percent. Disability issues in Ghana have evolved from a human rights concern to a developmental issue due to Ghana's high poverty rate.

== Policy and legislation ==
In 2006, the government of Ghana passed the Persons with Disability Act (Act 715) together with civil organizations and disability movement groups to cover rights, education, healthcare, employment, transportation, housing, medical rehabilitation, information dissemination, and cultural participation. Ghana has also committed to various international agreements, including the African Decade of Disabled Persons and the Convention on the Rights of Persons with Disabilities, becoming the 119th country in the world to ratify this convention to protect the rights and dignity of people living with disability. Although Ghana had signed the United Nations Convention on the Rights of Persons with Disabilities in March 2007, the government completed the ratification process by August 2012.

An estimated five million Ghanaians have disabilities, of which 2.8 million have a mental disability, however only one percent of the country's health budget is earmarked for mental health services.

== Stigma and inequities around disability ==
Despite the national policies and efforts of advocacy groups to advance the well-being of people living with disabilities in Ghana, they still face stigma, which stems from a lack of understanding about disability, societal attitudes, misconceptions and cultural beliefs. This stigma contributes to the marginalization and exclusion of this group from fully participating in Ghanaian society, resulting in socio-economic challenges. People with disability in Ghana face significant inequities, including poverty, inadequate access to healthcare and high unemployment rates. Societal biases in Ghana that view people with disability as less capable often make them unattractive candidates to potential employers. Additionally, they receive limited educational opportunities and skill development due to insufficient investment in their educational needs and stigmatization in schools.

In some communities in Ghana, persons with disabilities or deformities are assumed to be possessed by evil spirits.

== Spirit children phenomenon ==
In 2013, Ghanaian investigative journalist Anas Aremeyaw Anas reported on the Spirit children tradition practiced in some communities in Ghana. A "spirit child" is a child with a disability believed to possess magical powers that bring misfortune. Disability in Ghana is stigmatized, and in some communities, based on the advice of the community witchdoctor, a child thought to be a spirit child is killed. In the Kassena-Nankana District in Northern Ghana, Spirit children are referred to as chichuru or kinkiriko. These children primarily come from poor, rural areas. However, if a spirit child is considered "good," there are no punishments for the child or their family. In 2013, local communities where the practice of killing newborn babies with a disability had occurred enacted legislation to prohibit the killing of "Spirit children".

== Sport ==
Ghana has sent a team to every Summer Paralympic Games since 2004.

== Ghana Federation of Disability Organisations ==
The Ghana Federation of Disability Organisations is an umbrella group, founded in 1987, of smaller organisations representing various persons with disabilities in Ghana. The group has branches in nearly every one of Ghana's districts.

According to their website, the GFD's vision is "an inclusive society for all persons with disabilities in Ghana." Its mission is "to advocate the rights of Persons with Disability by influencing policies, programmes and activities at the national and local levels and to strengthen the organizations of Persons with Disabilities." Some of their successes so far have been at the political level, such as the "introduction of [a] tactile ballot system," allowing blind citizens to vote on their own since 2004; voter registration and participation for those in psychiatric hospitals since 2012; and advocacy for the 2006 Persons with Disability Act (Act 715) and the 2012 Mental Health Act (Act 846). In 2016, the GFD continued fighting for clarification of the Disability Act of 2006 by petitioning President John Dramani Mahama, hoping to increase protection of equality and public health-related provisions.

The GFD currently includes the Ghana Blind Union, Ghana National Association of the Deaf, Ghana Society of the Physically Disabled, Ghana Association of Persons with Albinism, Mental Health Society of Ghana, and Burns Survivors Association, as well as Inclusion Ghana which specialize in intellectual disability and Share Care Ghana which specialize in auto-immune and neurological disorders.

== Mental Illness ==
Out of a population of over 21.6 million, 650,000 Ghanaians have some type of acute mental disorder. An additional 2,166,000 have a moderate mental disability. Ghana provides only three psychiatric hospitals throughout the country to help those who have a mental disability. Also, for inpatient care there are 7 inpatient units (in general hospitals and clinics) and 4 community residential units.

Ghana is said to be "the most religious society in the world" (Religion in Ghana), with 96% of the population identifying with a particular spiritual belief. Mental illness is seen as caused by curses or demons. The only perceived solution to this problem is through practices like prayer, forced starvation and beatings, with only minimal medical help such medication given.

=== Prayer camps for the mentally ill ===
Ghana has religious alternative medicine institutes, known as Prayer camps, that replace hospital care for individuals with serious neuropsychiatric illness. People are often kept in these facilities against their will and then tortured by the staff. They receive only insignificant medical treatment and care.

A 2016 Yale University study showed that both prayer camp staff and psychiatric hospital mental health professionals show interest at the idea of collaboration. Specifically, prayer camp staff are interested in help with the provision and use of medication, as well as improving the hygiene and infrastructure of prayer camps. However, prayer camp staff are highly opposed to medical explanations of mental illness, instead preferring supernatural explanations, while the mental health and medical staff are concerned with the frequent use of torture. Furthermore, despite the importance of long-term medication use in patient recovery, prayer camp staff only endorse medication use over short periods.

== See also ==
- Health in Ghana
- Deafness in Ghana
- Disability rights
