= Yaba Badoe =

Ghanaian-British documentary filmmaker (born 1954)

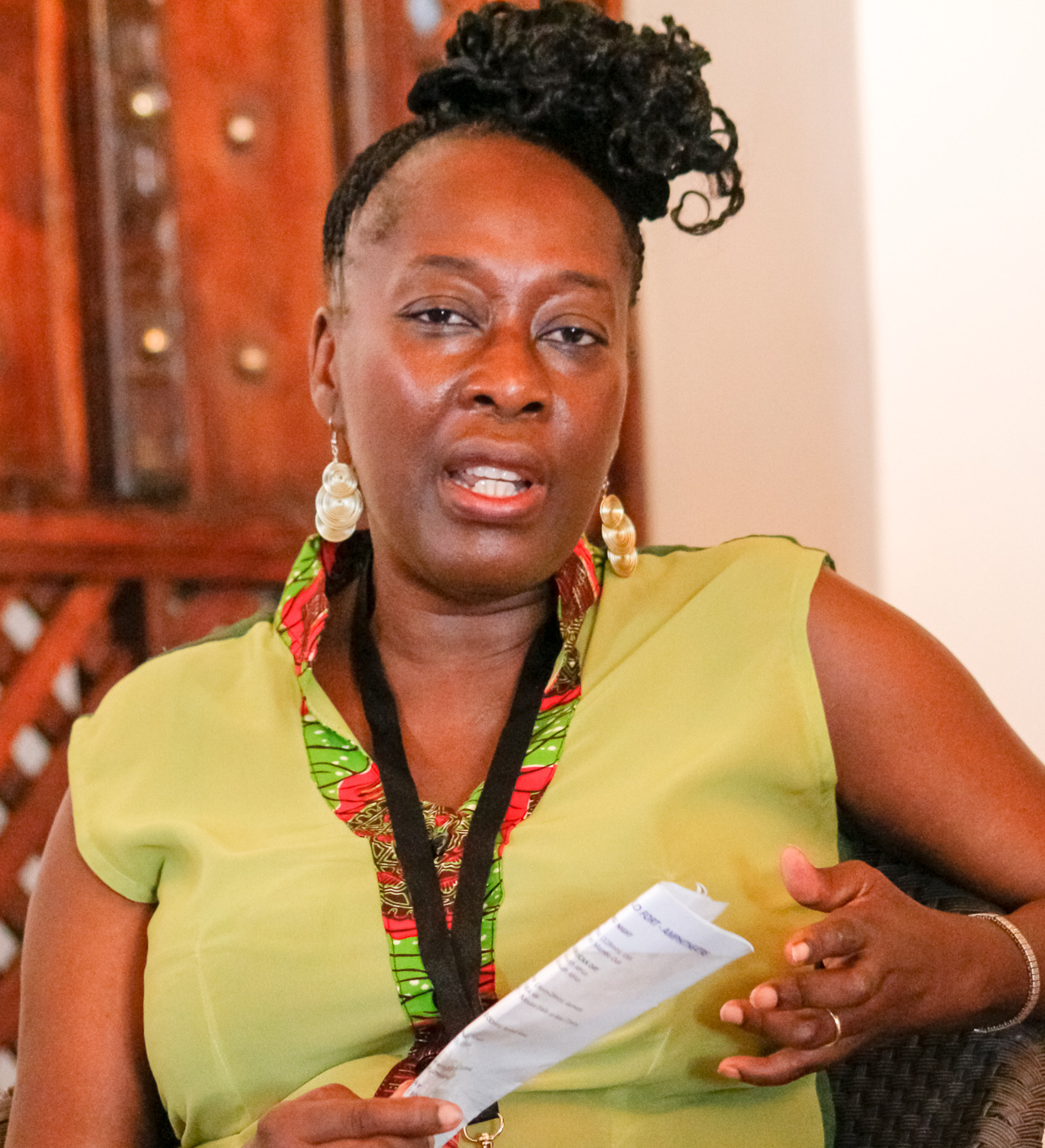
- Badoe at the 2015 Zanzibar International Film Festival
- Born: 1954 (age 71–72); Tamale, northern Ghana
- Education: King's College, Cambridge
- Occupations: Documentary filmmaker, journalist and author
- Spouse: Colin Izod
- Website: www.yababadoe.com

Yaba Badoe (born 1954) is a Ghanaian-British documentary filmmaker, journalist and author.

== Education and Career ==
Yaba Badoe was born in 1954 in Tamale, northern Ghana. She left Ghana to be educated in Britain at a very young age. A graduate of King's College, Cambridge, Badoe worked as a civil servant at the Ministry of Foreign Affairs in Ghana, before beginning her career in journalism as a trainee at the BBC. She also was a researcher at the Institute of African Studies at the University of Ghana. She has taught in Spain and Jamaica and has worked as a producer and director making documentaries for the main television channels in Britain. Among her credits are: Black and White (1987), an investigation into race and racism in Bristol, using hidden video cameras for BBC1; I Want Your Sex (1991), an arts documentary exploring images and myths surrounding black sexuality in Western art, literature, film and photography, for Channel 4; and the six-part series Voluntary Service Overseas for ITV in 2002.

In addition to making films, Badoe is a creative writer, her first novel, True Murder, being published in London by Jonathan Cape in 2009. Reviewing True Murder in The Africa Report, Zagba Oyortey described it as "a rich complex of wonder, loss, friendship and prescience from the viewpoint of Ajuba, an African girl transposed from her idyllic home in Ghana to a boarding school in rural England after the collapse of her parents’ marriage." Her short story "The Rivals" was included in the anthology African Love Stories (Ayebia, 2006), edited by Ama Ata Aidoo, and she has also written three children's books.

Badoe directed and co-produced (with Amina Mama) the documentary film The Witches of Gambaga, which won Best Documentary at the Black International Film Festival in 2010, and was awarded Second Prize in the Documentary section of FESPACO 2011. Her most recent film, launched in 2014, is entitled The Art of Ama Ata Aidoo.

In 2016, Badoe participated in the conference-festival "Telling Our Stories of Home: Exploring and Celebrating Changing African and Africa-Diaspora Communities" in Chapel Hill, North Carolina.

She is a contributor to the 2019 anthology New Daughters of Africa, edited by Margaret Busby.

== Personal life ==
Badoe lives in Balham, London, with her husband, Colin Izod.

== Filmography ==
- A Time of Hope (1983)
- Crowning Glory (1986)
- Black and White (1987)
- I Want Your Sex (1991)
- Supercrips and Rejects (1996)
- Race in the Frame (1996)
- A Commitment to Care – The Capable State (1997)
- Am I My Brother's Keeper? (2002)
- Voluntary Service Overseas (2002)
- One to One (2003)
- Secret World of Voodoo: Africa – Coming Home (2006)
- Honorable Women (2010)
- The Witches of Gambaga (2010)
- The Art of Ama Ata Aidoo (2014)

== Bibliography ==
- True Murder (Jonathan Cape, 2009, ISBN 978-0224085021)
- A Jigsaw of Fire and Stars (Zephyr/Head of Zeus, 2017, ISBN 978-1786695482)
- The Secret of the Purple Lake (Cassava Republic Press, 2017, ISBN 978-1911115311), five interlinked stories
- Wolf Light (Zephyr/Head of Zeus, 2019, ISBN 978-1786695529)
- Lionheart Girl (Zephyr/Head of Zeus, 2021, ISBN 978-1789540864)
- Man-Man and the Tree of Memories (forthcoming)
