= Public Health Advocates =

- Abbreviation: PHA
- Formation: 1999; 27 years ago
- Type: Nonprofit organization
- Executive Director: Harold Goldstein
- Chief Financial Officer: Anne Mace Deines
- Senior Director of State Policy: Flojaune Cofer
- Senior Director of Local Policy: Kula Koenig
- Staff: 43
- Website: www.phadvocates.org
- Formerly called: California Center for Public Health Advocacy

Public Health Advocates, formerly the California Center for Public Health Advocacy, located in Davis, California, is a nonprofit lobbying organization founded in 1999 by California's two public health associations which, according to its website, "tackles the underlying factors that perpetuate childhood obesity and undermine parents’ desire to keep their children healthy: multibillion-dollar marketing and overwhelming availability of unhealthy foods and beverages, limited access to fresh fruits and vegetables in far too many communities, schools failing to provide quality physical education, cities designed for cars rather than pedestrians and bicyclists, and lack of safe places for children to play." They run the anti-soft drink website Kickthecan.info, which has launched a petition to the beverage industry to "be a (real) part of the solution" whose signatories include Laurie David, Michael Jacobson, Robert Kenner, and Marion Nestle, and are behind a number of soda tax bills in their home state, such as that introduced by Bill Monning in February 2013. Its executive director, Harold Goldstein, has written an opinion piece in the Los Angeles Daily News regarding what he considers the benefits of soda taxation. He has also authored a policy brief by the University of California Los Angeles. Goldstein has also authored an article calling for celebrities to "stop accepting sugary drink endorsements," as well as a commentary in the Journal of Public Health Policy regarding the reasons why scientific research is not easily transformed into public health policy, and about the CCPHA's campaigns to, among other things, remove soda and junk food from public schools. Goldstein has also gone on record as saying that sugary drinks "should be prohibited in all public places, including community centres and sports arenas." The center has also published research concluding that were California Assembly Bill 669 to be passed, that "85 percent [of the money raised] or $1.4 billion, would be returned to counties, in proportion to their population, to pay for education and children’s health programs."

== Legislation ==
They have spent grant funding lobbying for a number of bills preventing sodas from being sold first in elementary, middle and junior high schools in 2003 through SB 677 (introduced by Deborah Ortiz), and then in high schools through SB 695 (introduced by Martha Escutia).

== Funding ==
On their official website they express gratitude to a number of foundations, including:

- The Bellwether Foundation
- Kaiser Permanente
- The Robert Wood Johnson Foundation
