= Witchcraft in Ghana =

Witchcraft beliefs are very real concerns for many Ghanaians and influence attitudes and daily behaviors. Shaped by colonial legacies, other religions, contemporary thought, and the current government in Ghana, witchcraft in Ghana is dynamic and intersects with other facets of life in Ghana. Because witchcraft is largely considered bad or evil, the fear of witchcraft can cause a variety of responses, some of which are harmful for the accused.

== History and cultural influence ==
Witchcraft is a worldwide phenomenon, deeply rooted in many African countries and communities in Sub-Saharan Africa, including in Ghana. However, specific beliefs in or perceptions of witchcraft vary between the world's countries and within regions of Ghana. Bayie is the Twi word most closely translated as "witchcraft" used by the Akan people in Ghana. The Akan are the ethnic numerical majority in Ghana, comprising roughly 50% of the population. As a result, their witchcraft beliefs are the most prevalent and well-researched, although other ethnic groups may have conflicting spiritual beliefs. Unless specified, the following characterizations of Ghanaian witchcraft are applied as generalizations.

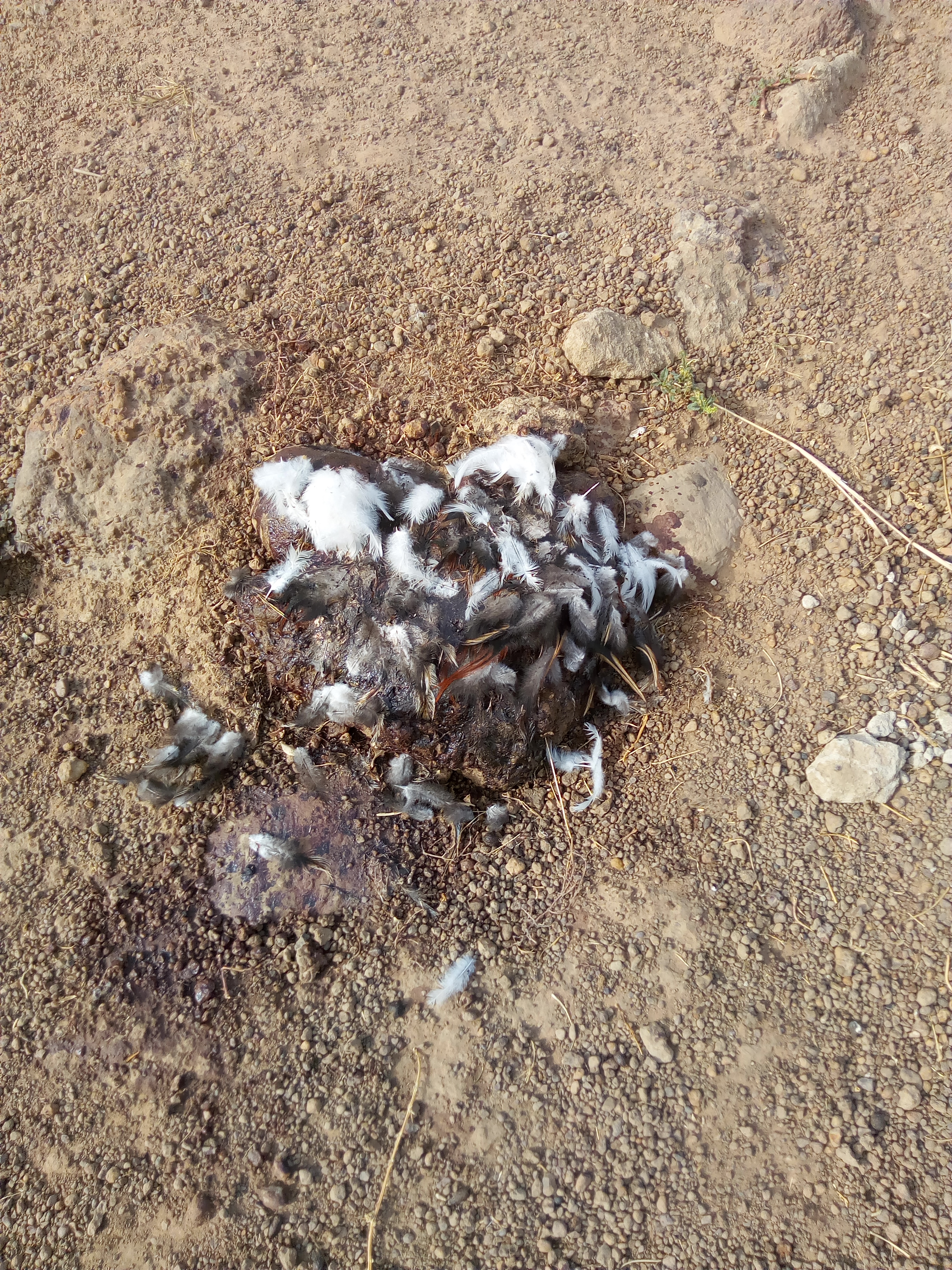
This anti-witchcraft shrine is believed to have the ability to neutralize witchcraft powers. It is found in the Tindaanzee witch camp - Kpatinga of the Northern Region of Ghana.

In Ghana, witchcraft is primarily practiced by women—although there are also male witches (or wizards)—and is passed down through matrilineal descent. The Akan believe that witches can only bewitch maternal kin, while Ewe people believe that witches can bewitch anyone.

Shelagh Roxburgh concluded through field research that there is no clear definition of what witchcraft is exactly, but there is a common factor in what civilians perceive it as: it causes harm. Witches are distinguished from healers, who use their powers for aiding rather than "evil". Witches are said to be able to cause infertility, bring disease, create poverty or material loss, cause conflict, destroy personal destiny, snatch sexual organs, and even kill.

Precolonial practices for determining a witch include odum poison ordeal and "corpse-carrying". Corpse carrying refers to the practice in which people would carry a dead body and the body would point to the individual responsible for the death through witchcraft. Precolonial responses to those guilty of witchcraft included exile, medicine usage, public executions, cleansing at a shrine, and even selling individuals into slavery.

Tales of witch beliefs and accusations occur through various forms of media including television, newspaper, and magazines, and law. However, research in Eastern Ghana indicates that Akan who live by the Kwahu sandstone plateau often engage with witchcraft informally; suspicions are spread through word-of-mouth away from formal public affairs.

=== Colonial history and context ===
When Ghana was colonized by the British in 1874, the state reserved the right to administer capital punishment for witchcraft and pre-colonial witchcraft test were similarly outlawed. However, native tribunals continued to judge witchcraft cases without legal authority. In 1927, the Native Administration Ordinance (NAO) granted the Gold Coast Tribunals the official authority to judge witchcraft cases, which brought them into legal compliance and legitimized native tribunal cases.

Some researchers consider witchcraft perceptions and beliefs as opportunities for Africans to be able to imagine and perceive their own world outside of colonial objectives and values; Shelagh Roxburgh, for instance, claims that news media sensationalism of witchcraft-related violence is a continuation of the colonial objective to rewrite African realities and dismiss witchcraft.

Within religion, African Independent/Initiated Churches (AICs) were created in the early twentieth century, an era of colonial control and foreign missionary influence, in response to inadequate Western Christian missionary responses to African spiritual and witchcraft-related concerns. AICs blend Western biblical notions with traditional beliefs (including those of witchcraft), practices, and interpretations to challenge colonial separations of sacred and secular worlds.

=== Religion ===
The 2012 WIN-Gallup International 'Religion and Atheism Index' claimed that Ghana is the most religious country in the world with 96 percent of it population identifying as religious. Within Ghana, 45% identify as following traditional African beliefs, 43% as Christian, and 12% as Muslim.

Traditional African religions depict the universe as a multitude of spirits that are able to be used for good or evil. Popular religions in Ghana such as Christianity and Islam coexist with the beliefs of spirits, evil, and witchcraft illustrated in traditional beliefs; in fact, some people join other religions to have other deities to look over them and protect them from witchcraft.

In predominantly Christian communities, it is common to find articles and news on what "good" Christians can do to fight evil forces of witchcraft. Some Christian congregations perform deliverance prayers to release victims from the power of witches. In early colonial missions, the Christian missionary failed to understand African responses to witchcraft and the gospel, and suppressed witchcraft thought because Western leaders believed it to hamper progress and modernity. Since, alongside the creation of AICs, Christian congregations have attempted to address the problem of witchcraft in contemporary times. Opoku Oniynah, Ghanaian theologist, defines the combination of traditional African religions and Christianity as a theology called "witchdemonology," to which he expresses concern over the ministry's preoccupation with witchcraft. Oniynah's concerns demonstrate a continued conflict of ideas such as modernity, progress, and sophistication within Christian Ghanaian faith.

Research has found that accusations of witchcraft are frequently encouraged by or started alongside Christian clergyman and fetish priests, and that deeper investigations have revealed subsequent human rights abuses.

=== Music ===
Witchcraft themes and stories are present in Ghanaian music culture. Sang in Akan, the dominant non-English language in Ghana, popular songs reference witchcraft as explanation for things such as infertility, alcoholism, and death. Music is also used as a mode of activism against witch accusations and witchcraft-related violence. The album Witch Camp: I've Forgotten Now Who I Used to Be consists of twenty tracks of accused women singing and playing on found instruments to empower them and tell their stories.

== Violence against women ==
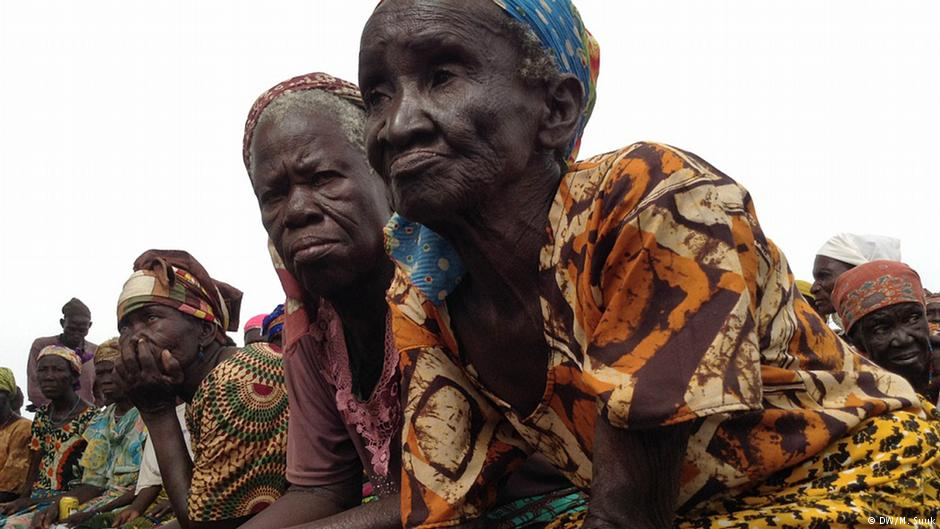
Women living in witch camps in northern Ghana

Violence such as beatings, burnings, and torture are sometimes responses to accusations of magic and witchcraft. In some cases, women are lynched as a result of accusations. Accusations of witchcraft happen to women of all ages, but at a higher incidence for older women of lower socio-economic status. Although spirituality and belief in witchcraft is common across Ghana, there is pushback within the country's legal system, human rights groups, and public against murdering alleged witches. Witch camps and other interventions have arisen at the local, national, and international scales in response to witchcraft accusation-related violence.

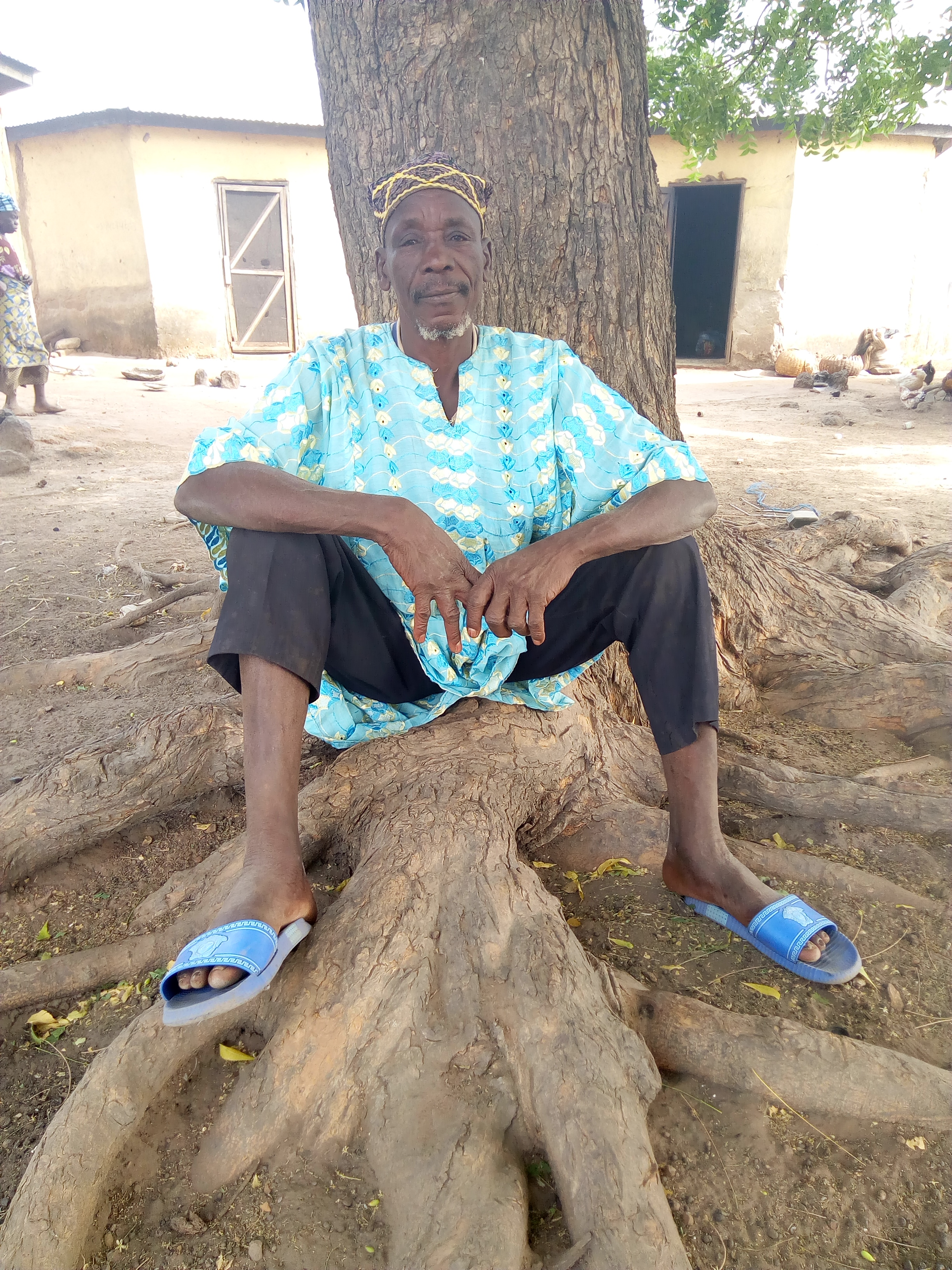
The tindana of the Tindaanʒee witch camp.

=== Witch camps ===
A witch camp is a place for those accused of witchcraft to seek refuge from their local neighbors and residents. Ghanaian witch camps are said to have been active for more than 100 years. Some academics use the term "accused women's settlements" because they claim the term is closer to the local reality of these communities. Traditionally, these camps are run by a tindana (p. tindaamba), or a local earth priest able to cleanse women and the community of witchcraft and who protect the women living in witch camps. Today, they are still run by tindaamba, but they are in threat of being shut down by the government and partner NGOs.

Around 1000 women reportedly live in these camps with very limited resources including the lack of running water and electricity. The mental health and quality of life for these women is also degraded. NGOs such as ActionAid, Songtaba, and Amnesty International have advocated for the closing and abolition of witch camps on behalf of women's rights and human's rights.

=== NGO interventions ===
The current framing led by NGOs such as ActionAid focuses on human rights violations and victimizations of women accused of and attacked for witchcraft activities. The frequently demand the closures of witch camps, justice for accused women, and reintegration into their communities. However, most NGOs follow modern, rights-based Western logics that are dismissive of witchcraft beliefs and very real concerns about witchcraft that residents live with. Some researchers find that dismissal of witchcraft beliefs alienates locals and attempts unsustainable solutions that may endanger accused women in reintegration efforts.

=== Government interventions ===
In Ghana, it is a criminal offense to accuse or mention someone as being a witch. However, witchcraft-related violence still occurs, oftentimes without criminal prosecution or other legal response. The government operates according Western institutional power that struggles to address spiritual issues such as witchcraft. The government is further limited by the fact that most abuse and marginalization related to Ghanaian witchcraft occurs intimately within families.

== Witchcraft among children ==
Children also inadvertently spread and reinforce beliefs about witchcraft, as found in a study on secondary school children. Other researchers have demonstrated that younger people tend to point to their older relatives to explain their own failures.

Adults are not the only population that can be involved with or accused of witchcraft. Akan believe that children can be given witchcraft powers as infants, at birth, or in utero. One study found that children between the ages of one month and seventeen years are branded as witches, often from poor, rural backgrounds. This can result in social stigmatization and school drop outs, as well as physical violence such as brutalization, neglect, and infrequently the murder of accused children. An estimated 700 children live in witch camps to escape violence. Academics and activists call for increased advocacy and protections, including increased penalties for child abuse.

=== Spirit children ===
A "spirit child" in Ghana is a disabled child who is believed to possess magical powers to cause misfortune. Disability in Ghana is greatly stigmatized and the only way considered acceptable to deal with the problem is to kill them via advice by a witchdoctor. Spirit children are referred to as chichuru or kinkiriko in the Kassena-Nankana district in Northern Ghana. Like accused witches, these children primarily come from poor, rural areas. However, if a spirit child is known to be "good" there are no punishments for the child or their family.
