= Oscar Liwaal =

Ghanaian politician

Hon. Oscar Liwaal
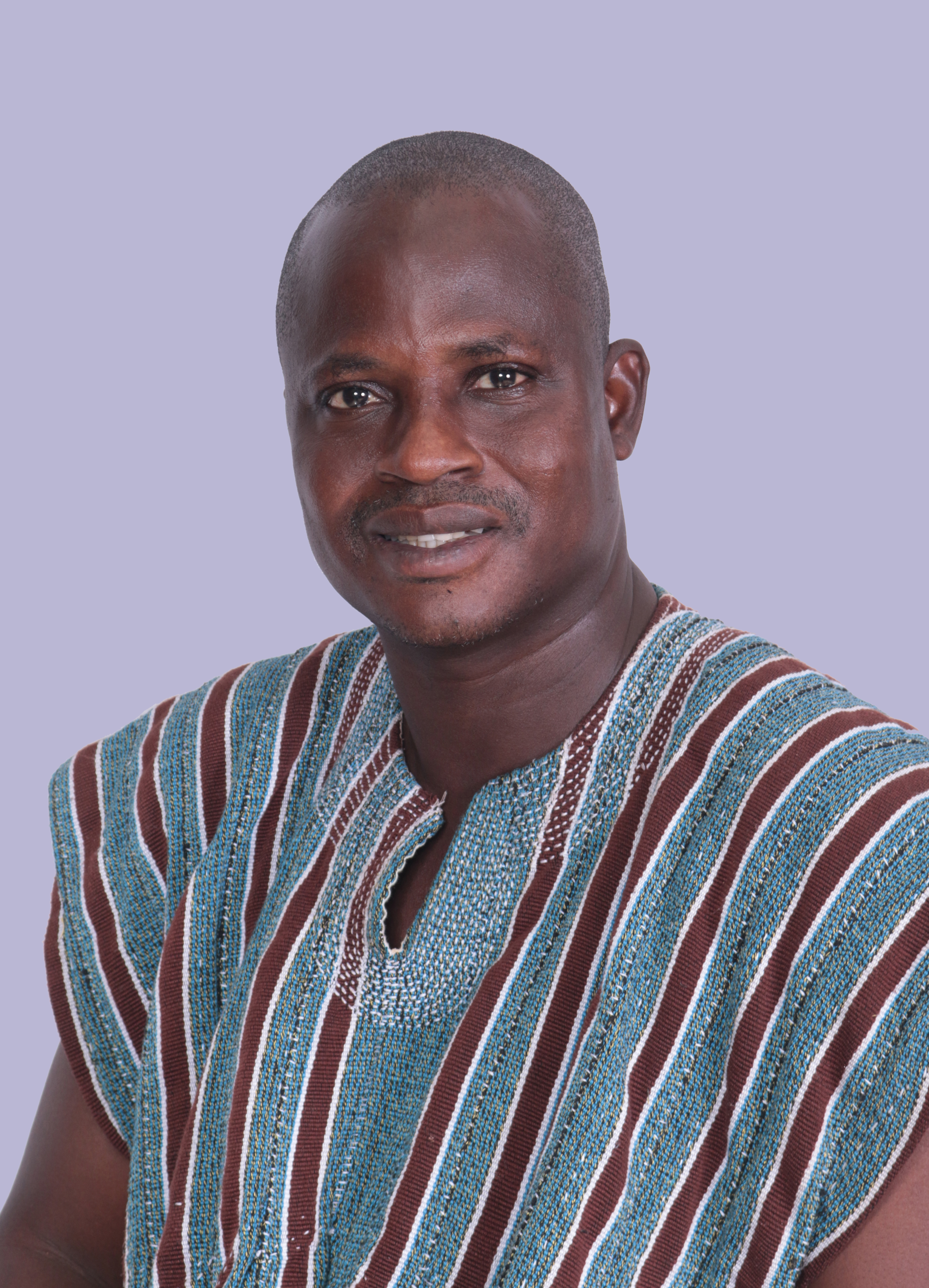

Member of Parliament for Yunyoo Constituency
- Incumbent
- Assumed office 7 January 2021
- Preceded by: Naabu Joseph Bipoba

Personal details
- Born: Oscar Liwaal; 1 May 1978 (age 48) Jimbale, North East Region, Ghana
- Party: New Patriotic Party
- Occupation: Politician
- Committees: Members holding Office of Profit Committee (Vice Chairperson); Health Committee

Oscar Liwaal (born 1 May 1978) is a Ghanaian politician. He is a member of the Eighth Parliament of the Fourth Republic of Ghana representing the Yunyoo Constituency in the Yunyoo-Nasuan District in the North East Region of Ghana. He was a former chief executive officer for Bunkpurugu Yunyoo and Yunyoo-Nasuan district respectively.

== Early life and career ==
Liwaal was born on 1 May 1978. He hails from Jimbale. He is a teacher by profession. He holds a degree in education (2013).

== Politics ==
Liwaal is a member of the New Patriotic Party. In 2017, he was nominated by President Nana Akufo-Addo and confirmed as the District chief executive for Bunkpurugu Yunyoo in the then Northern region. He was later moved to head the newly formed Yunyoo-Nasuan district. He contested the Yunyoo Constituency seat in 2016 but lost to the incumbent Naabu Joseph Bipoba. He was again chosen as the party's candidate for the December 2020 election. He won the parliamentary election with 12,103 votes representing 56.3% of the total votes cast, beating his main opponent and incumbent member of parliament Naabu Joseph Bipoba of the NDC who obtained 9177 votes representing 42.7% of the total valid votes cast.

=== Committees ===
He serves as the vice chairperson and member of the Members holding Office of Profit Committee and Health Committee respectively in the Eighth Parliament of the Fourth Republic of Ghana.

== Personal life ==
He is a Christian.
