= Bunkpurugu-Yunyoo (Ghana parliament constituency) =

Ghana parliament constituency

- constituency for the Parliament of Ghana
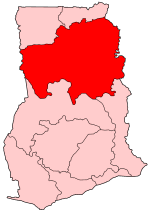
- District: Bunkpurugu-Yunyoo District
- Region: Northern Region of Ghana

Current constituency
- Party: National Democratic Congress
- MP: Duut Emmanuel Kwame

Bunkpurugu-Yunyoo was one of the constituencies represented in the Parliament of Ghana. It elected its Member of Parliament (MP) by the first past the post system of election. Bunkpurugu-Yunyoo was located in the Bunkpurugu-Yunyoo district of the erstwhile Northern Region of Ghana. It was split into the Bunkpurugu and Yunyoo constituencies prior to the 2012 Ghanaian general election.

== Boundaries ==
The seat is located within the Bole district of the Northern Region of Ghana.

== Members of Parliament ==
Election	Member	Party
1992	Joseph Yaani Labik	National Democratic Congress
2000	Namburr Berrick	National Democratic Congress
2004	Joseph Yaani Labik	Independent
2008	Duut Emmanuel Kwame	National Democratic Congress
2012	Constituency split into Bunkpurugu and Yunyoo constituencies	

== Elections ==
MPs elected in the Ghana parliamentary election, 2008: Bunkpurugu-Yunyoo Source:Ghana Home Page
Party	Candidate	Votes	%	±%
National Democratic Congress	Duut Emmanuel Kwame	9,205	28.7	7.4
New Patriotic Party	Dubik Mahama Yakubu	6,800	21.2	−1.6
Independent	Joseph Labik Yaani	6,395	19.9	−6.6
Independent	Joseph Bipuba Naabu	5,875	18.3	—
People's National Convention	Dubik Abraham Saman	2,425	7.6	−0.2
Independent	Jabon Thomas Lomnan	915	2.9	—
Democratic Freedom Party	John B. Bugri	301	0.9	—
Convention People's Party	Duut Martin Kombian	162	0.5	−0.9
Majority		2,405	7.5	3.8
Turnout		—	—	—

2004 Ghanaian parliamentary election: Bunkpurugu-Yunyoo Source:Electoral Commission of Ghana
Party	Candidate	Votes	%	±%
Independent	Joseph Yaani Labik	8,436	26.5	4.4
New Patriotic Party	Mahama Yakubu Dubik	7,265	22.8	9.4
National Democratic Congress	Namburr Berrick	6,791	21.3	−4.5
Independent	Joseph Bipoba Naabu	6,447	20.2	—
People's National Convention	Saman A. Dubik	2,480	7.8	−7.2
Convention People's Party	Duut Martin Kombian	461	1.4	0.3
Majority		1,171	3.7	0.0
Turnout		33,616	90.5	—

2000 Ghanaian parliamentary election: Bunkpurugu-Yunyoo Source:Adam Carr's Election Archive
Party	Candidate	Votes	%	±%
National Democratic Congress	Namburr Berrick	7,251	25.8	−54.6
Independent	Joseph Yaani Labik	6,206	22.1	—
Independent	Elizabeth P Poyari	4,224	15.0	—
People's National Convention	James Lamisi Nawang	4,220	15.0	6.4
New Patriotic Party	David Dubique Konlaa	3,779	13.4	—
National Reform Party	Thomas Akar Gyimah	2,141	7.6	—
Convention People's Party	Konmong A Elijah	304	1.1	—
Majority		1,045	3.7	−65.7
Turnout		28,125		—

1996 Ghanaian parliamentary election: Bunkpurugu-Yunyoo Source:Electoral Commission of Ghana
Party	Candidate	Votes	%	±%
National Democratic Congress	Joseph Yaani Labik	26,017	80.4	—
People's Convention Party	David Dubique Konlaa	3,547	11.0	—
People's National Convention	Kombian Banamin	2,785	8.6	—
Majority		22,470	69.4	—
Turnout		33,475	82.2	—

1992 Ghanaian parliamentary election: Bunkpurugu-Yunyoo Source:Electoral Commission of Ghana
Party	Candidate	Votes	%	±%
National Democratic Congress	Joseph Yaani Labik			—
Majority				—
Turnout				—

== See also ==
- List of Ghana Parliament constituencies
