= Abed-nego Bandim =

Ghanaian politician

Hon. Abed-nego Bandim
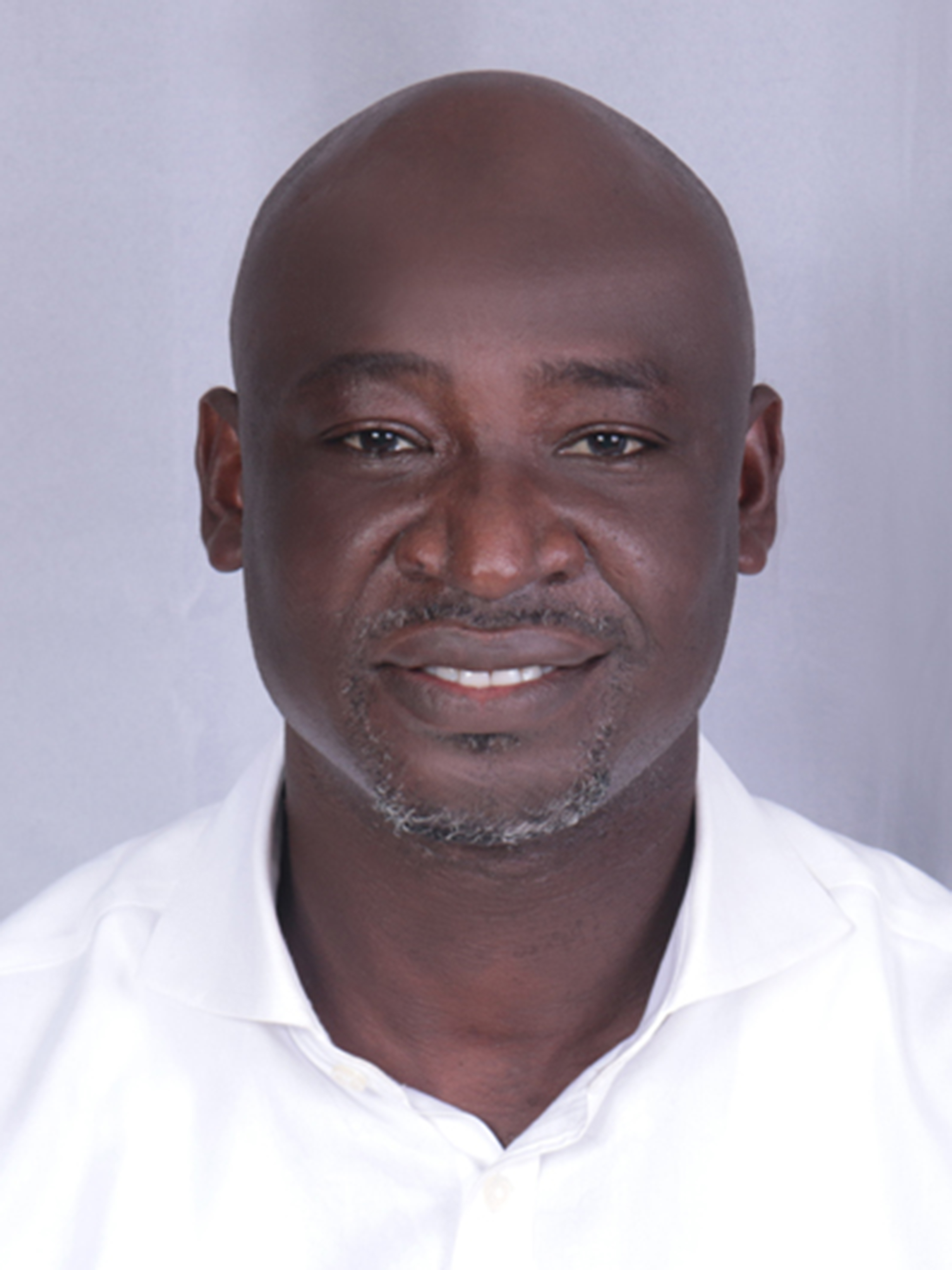

Member of Parliament for Bunkpurugu Constituency
- Incumbent
- Assumed office 7 January 2021
- Preceded by: Solomon Namliit Boar

Personal details
- Born: Abdulai Abanga; 12 February 1977 (age 49) Nakpanduri, Ghana
- Party: National Democratic Congress
- Occupation: Politician
- Committees: Communications Committee

Abed-nego Bandim (born 12 February 1977) is a Ghanaian politician, a member of the National Democratic Congress. Honorable Abed- nego Bandim is the member of parliament for the Bunkpurugu (Nyankpanduri District) in the North East Region of Ghana.

== Early life and education ==
Abed-Nego hails from Nakpanduri in the North East Region. He holds Masters of Law in Information Communication and Technology Law. He obtained his WAEC certificate in 1995.

== Personal life ==
Honorable Abed-Nego Bandim is a Christian. He is not only a politician, but also Chief Manager at National Communication Authority (NCA).
