= Teanoba =

Community in North East Region, Ghana

- Town
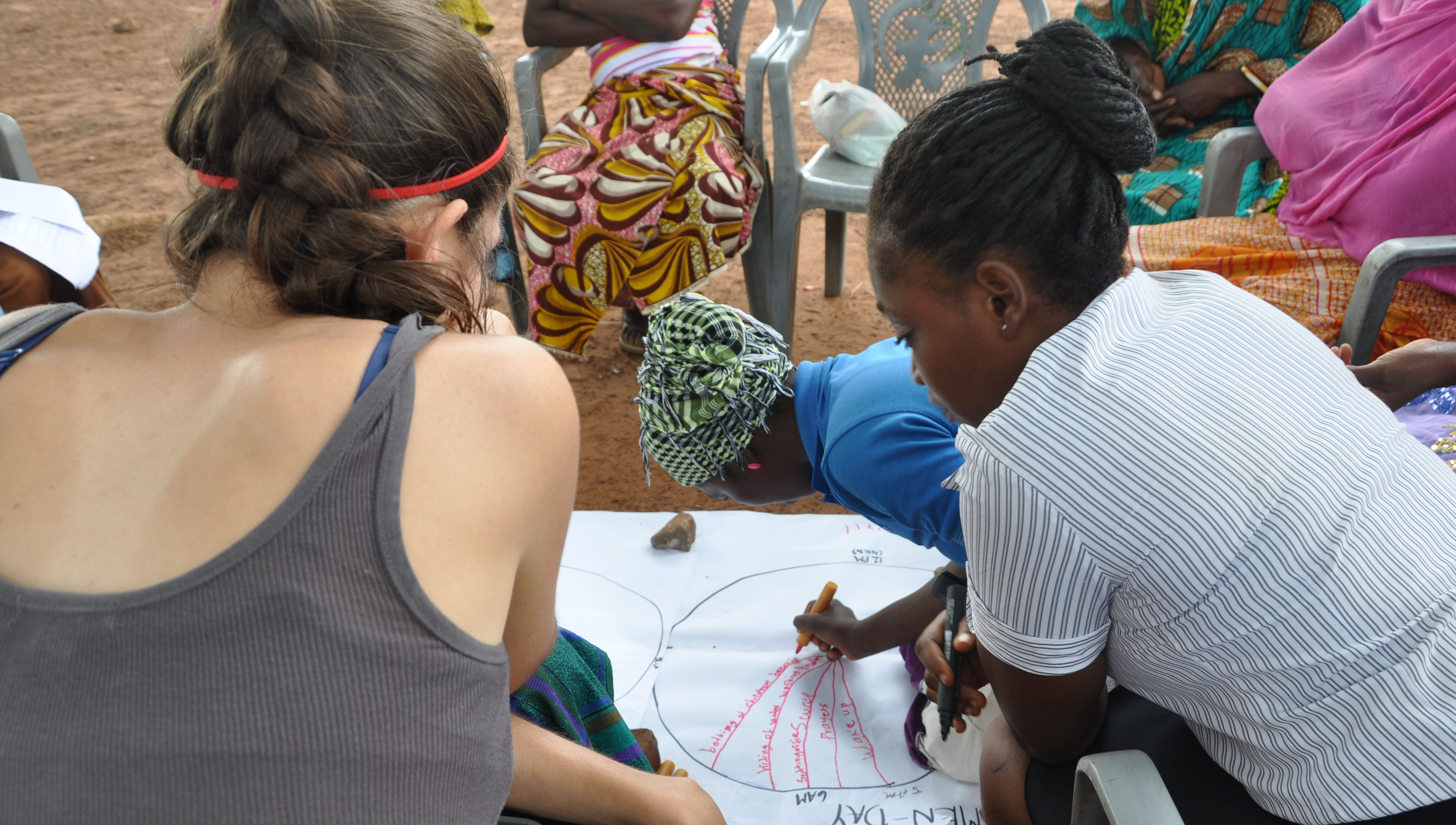
- Country: Ghana
- Region: North East Region
- District: Mamprusi East Municipal District

Population
  - Total: —
- Time zone: GMT
  - Summer (DST): GMT

Teanoba is a community near Nalerigu in the Mamprusi East Municipal District in the North East Region of Ghana.
