= Joseph Bipoba Naabu =

Ghanaian politician (born 1964)

Member of the Ghana Parliament for Yunyoo Constituency
- Incumbent
- Assumed office 7 January 2013
- Preceded by: Constituency split

Personal details
- Born: 24 August 1964 (age 62) Namong, Ghana
- Party: National Democratic Congress
- Education: University of Ghana; University of London

Joseph Bipoba Naabu (born 24 August 1964) is a Ghanaian politician and member of the Seventh Parliament of the Fourth Republic of Ghana representing the Yunyoo Constituency in the Northern Region on the ticket of the National Democratic Congress.

== Early life ==
Naabu was born on 24 August 1964 in Namong, in the Ashanti Region of Ghana.

== Education ==
Naabu earned a bachelor of art degree in political science from the University of Ghana in 2006. He then went to Ghana School of Law to study for a Bachelor of Law degree and later went to the University of London to study Literally Legum Baccalaureus, 2009.

== Career ==
Naabu is a farmer and was the managing director of J.B. Naabu Farms and Company Limited prior to entering politics.

== Politics ==
Naabu was elected to represent the Yunyoo constituency during the 2012 Ghanaian general election on the ticket of the National Democratic Congress. He was re-elected during the 2016 Ghanaian general election to hold office in that capacity for a second term.

=== 2012 election ===
Naabu contested the Yunyoo constituency parliamentary seat on the ticket of National Democratic Congress during the 2012 Ghanaian general election and won the election with 9,591 votes representing 65.32% of the total votes. He won the election over Alhassan John Kweku of the New Patriotic Party who polled 4,318 votes which is equivalent to 29.41%, and the parliamentary candidate for the PPP Walibe Amos had 773 votes representing 5.26% of the total votes.

=== 2016 election ===
Naabu was re-elected as a member parliament for Yunyoo constituency on the ticket of the National Democratic Congress (NDC) during the 2016 Ghanaian general election. He won the election with 7,051 votes representing 43.71% of the total votes. He was elected over Liwaal Oscar of the New Patriotic Party, Elizabeth Pijit Poyari (IND), Laar Namisub of the PPP and Dawuda Nafisah of the Convention People's Party. They obtained 6,659 votes, 1,668 votes, 470 votes and 256 votes respectively, equivalent to 41.40%, 10.37%, 2.98% and 1.59% of the total votes respectively.

==== 2020 election ====
Naabu again contested the Yunyoo constituency on the NDC ticket during the 2020 Ghanaian general election but lost the election to Oscar Liwaal of the New Patriotic Party.

== Personal life ==
Naabu is married with four children. He identifies as a Christian and is a member of the Catholic Church.
