= Santa, Ghana =

Farming Community in Ghana

- Town
- Location of Santa within Ghana
- Coordinates: 10.388°N 1.396°W

Santa is a farming community in the Mamprugu-Moagduri District in the North East Region of Ghana.

It was formerly located in the West Mamprusi District and the Northern Region, until the Mamprugu-Moagduri District was split from the West Mamprusi District in 2012 and the North East Region was created following a 2018 referendum.

In 2010, the population of Santa was 487. It has access to two functional boreholes for potable water. In 2018, construction was started on a 3-unit classroom block to improve access to education. People in Santa are predominantly farmers.
