= Karimenga =

Community in North East Region, Ghana

- Country: Ghana
- Region: North East Region
- District: West Mamprusi Municipal District

Karimenga is a village and a farming community in the West Mamprusi Municipality in the Bunkpurugu/Nakpanduri District in the North East Region of Ghana. On its hills, is the location of a two-bedroom apartment which was the hideout of Dr. Kwame Nkrumah which was once known as “Kwame Nkrumah Guest House”.

== History ==
In the 18th century, the village was called Timeema meaning "Let's build" in the local dialect. Satanbla who was a hunter discovered the place and built a trend. He was later joined by others from the Wulugu village because of how fertile the land was. The people who joined him would ask "how much to build" and Satanbla would say "Timeema". Because he was the first to discover the place, he became the village leader.

== Infrastructures ==
- Primary school
- Guest house
- Mosque
- Kasajan Quarry
- The Green House
