= Yunyoo =

- Location in Ghana
- Coordinates: 10°28′56.5″N 0°1′0.9″W
- Country: Ghana
- Region: North East Region
- District: Yunyoo-Nasuan District
- Established: 15 March 2018
- Seat: Yunyoo constituency

Government
  - Type: District Assembly
  - Body: Yunyoo-Nasuan District Assembly
  - Chief Executive: Oscar Liwaal
- Elevation: 252 m (827 ft)
- Time zone: GMT
  - Summer (DST): GMT
- Ghana Post GPS: NP
- Area code: +233 37 21

Yunyoo is the capital of the Yunyoo-Nasuan District in the North East Region of Ghana. The district was one of the new ones inaugurated on 15 March 2018 in Ghana.

Yunyoo is linked by a road entering it from Bunkpurugu in the east and running westwards and connecting to the N2 highway at its end. It is at an elevation of 252 metres. The nearest airport in Ghana is the Tamale Airport in the capital of the Northern Region.

Nakpanduri is located to the north west, Nasuan to the west and Bunkpurugu to the east.

== See also ==
- Yunyoo (Ghana parliament constituency)
