= Alima Mahama =

Ghanaian lawyer, politician and diplomat

Amb Hajia Alima Mahama
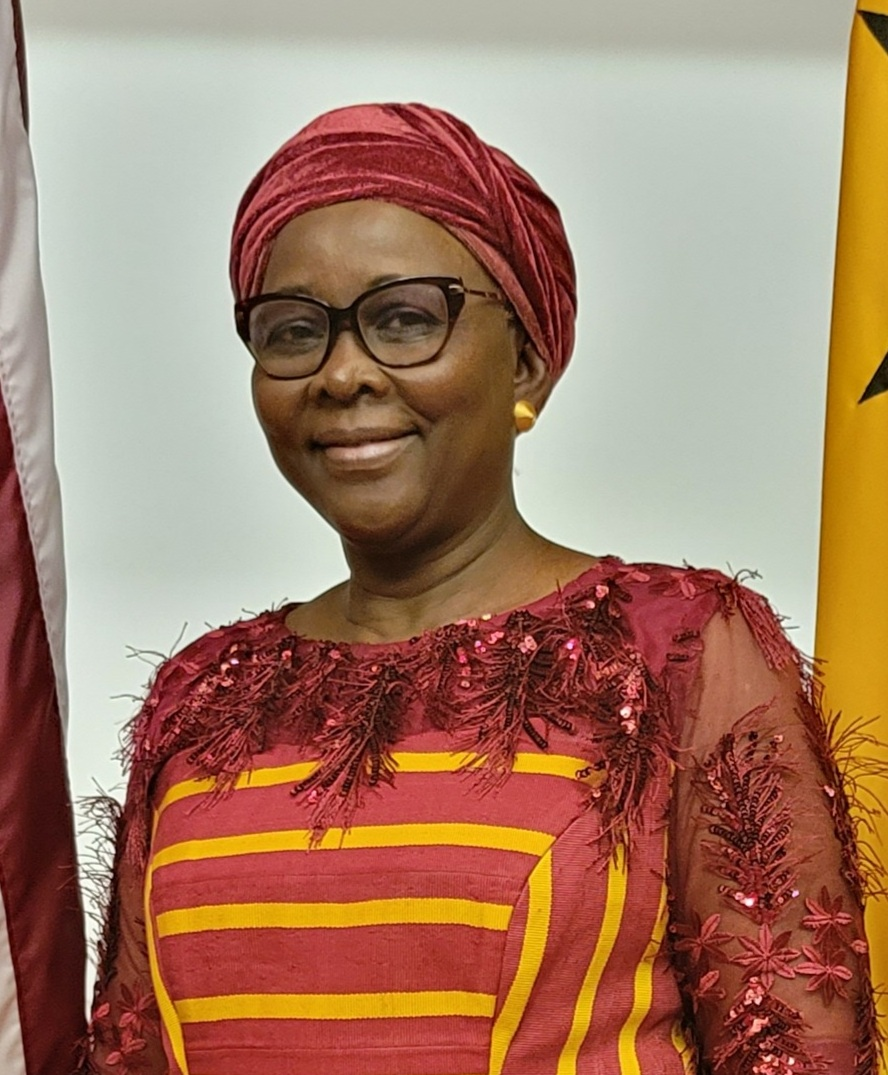
- Her Excellency Alima Mahama (Hajia)

Ambassador of the Republic of Ghana to the United States
- Incumbent
- Assumed office June 2021
- President: Nana Akuffo-Addo
- Preceded by: Baffour Adjei Bawuah

Minister of Local Government and Rural Development
- Incumbent
- Assumed office 28 January 2017
- President: Nana Akufo-Addo
- Preceded by: Julius Debrah

Member of the Ghana Parliament for Nalerigu
- Incumbent
- Assumed office 7 January 2013
- Preceded by: New constituency
- Majority: 27,501

Minister for Women and Children's Affairs
- President: John Kufour
- President: John Atta Mills; John Mahama

Personal details
- Born: 17 November 1957 (age 68) Walewale, Ghana
- Party: New Patriotic Party
- Education: University of Ghana
- Occupation: Politician
- Profession: Lawyer

Hajia Alima Mahama (born 17 November 1957, in Walewale, North East Region) is Ghana's first female ambassador to the US. She is a lawyer and the former Minister for the affairs of women and children in Ghana under President John Kufuor (January 2005 to January 2009) She was also the Ghanaian Minister of Local Government and Rural Development, appointed to the office by President Nana Akuffo-Addo on 10 January 2017 to 7 January 2021. Hajia Alima also served as the Member of Parliament for Nalerigu/Gambaga constituency and a member of the New Patriotic Party in the 7th Parliament of the 4th Republic.

She was appointed Ambassador of Ghana to the United States in June 2021, an office she served in till December 2024.

== Education ==
Alima Mahama had her senior high school education at the Wesley Girls Senior High School, Cape Coast. She continued her education at the University of Ghana where she earned a bachelor's degree in Law and Sociology. At the Rutgers University and the University of Ottawa, she had her postgraduate degree in Public Policy and Development Planning and Administration respectively. She has also earned a master's degree in Development Studies from the Institute of Social Studies, in the Netherlands. Hajia Mahama is a product of the Ghana School of Law and was called to the bar in 1982.

== Politics ==
She served in the government of John Agyekum Kufuor, firstly as the Minister for Women and Children Affairs, Deputy Minister for Trade and Industry, Deputy Minister for Local Government and Rural Development between 2001 and 2008. Alima Mahama contested the 2016 election on the ticket of the New Patriotic Party (NPP) and won with over 53% of the votes in Nalerigu/Gambaga constituency.

== Other activities ==
- Clean Cooking Alliance, Member of the Leadership Council
