= Bunkpurugu (Ghana parliament constituency) =

Ghana parliament constituency

- constituency for the Parliament of Ghana
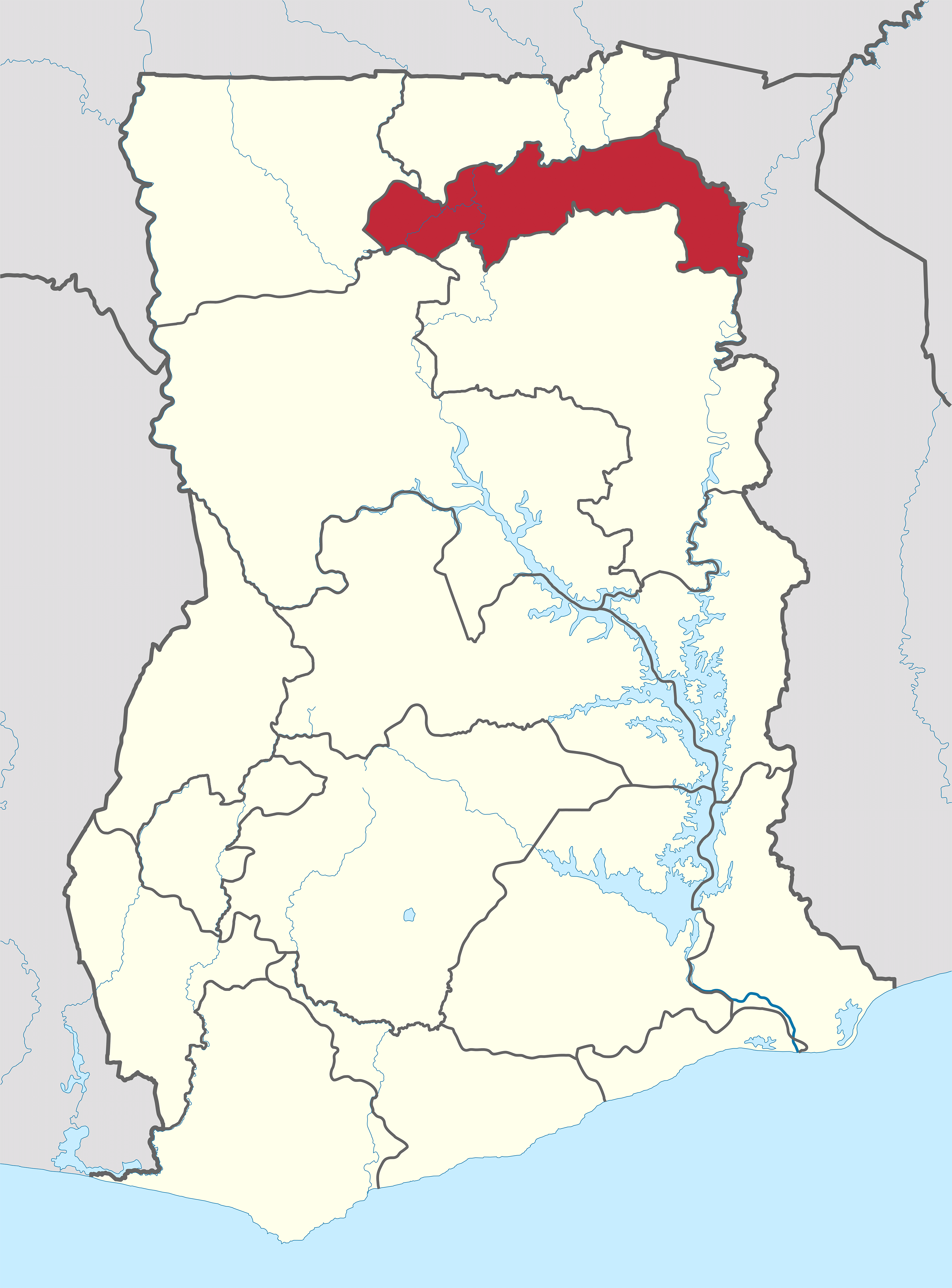
- District: Bunkpurugu Nyankpanduri District
- Region: North East Region of Ghana

Current constituency
- Party: National Democratic Congress
- MP: Abed-nego Bandim

Bunkpurugu is one of the constituencies represented in the Parliament of Ghana. It elects one Member of Parliament (MP) by the first past the post system of election. Bandim Abed-nego Azumah is the member of parliament for the constituency. Bunkpurugu is located in the Bunkpurugu-Yunyoo District of the North East Region of Ghana.

== Members of Parliament ==
First elected	Member	Party
2012	Solomon Namliit Boar	New Patriotic Party
2020	Abed-nego Bandim	National Democratic Congress
2024	Abed-nego Bandim	National Democratic Congress

== See also ==
- Bunkpurugu-Yunyoo (Ghana parliament constituency)
