= Issifu Seidu =

Ghanaian politician

Hon. Issifu Seidu MP
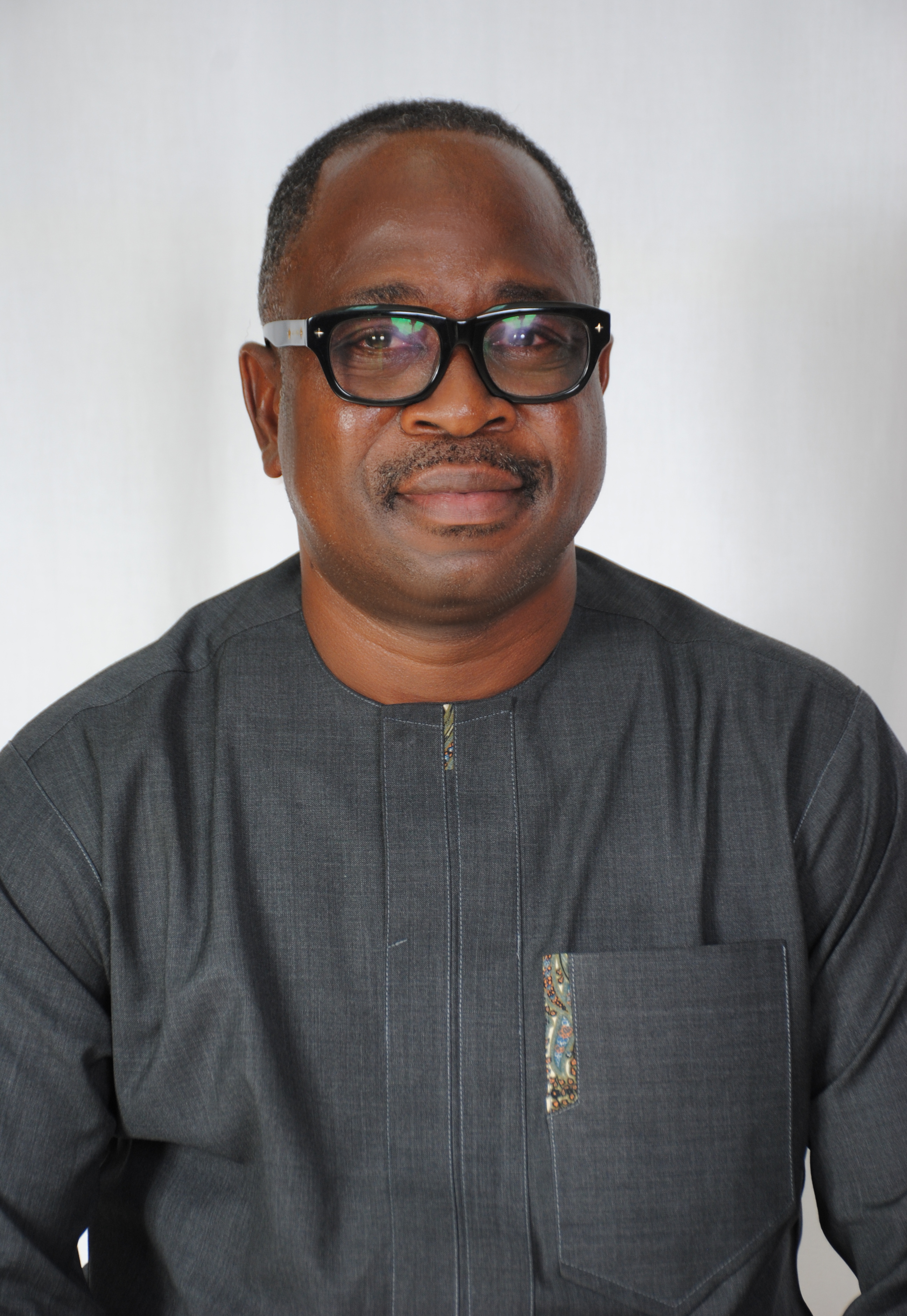

Member of Parliament for Nalerigu Constituency
- In office 7 January 2021 – 6 January 2025

Personal details
- Born: Issifu Seidu; 24 July 1969 (age 56) Nalerigu, Ghana
- Occupation: Politician
- Committees: Subsidiary Legislation Committee, Trade, Industry and Tourism Committee

Issifu Seidu (born 24 July 1969) is a Ghanaian politician and member of parliament for the Nalerigu constituency in the North East Region of Ghana.

== Personal life ==
Issifu seidu is a muslim.
