= Nalerigu (Ghana parliament constituency) =

Ghana parliament constituency

- constituency for the Parliament of Ghana
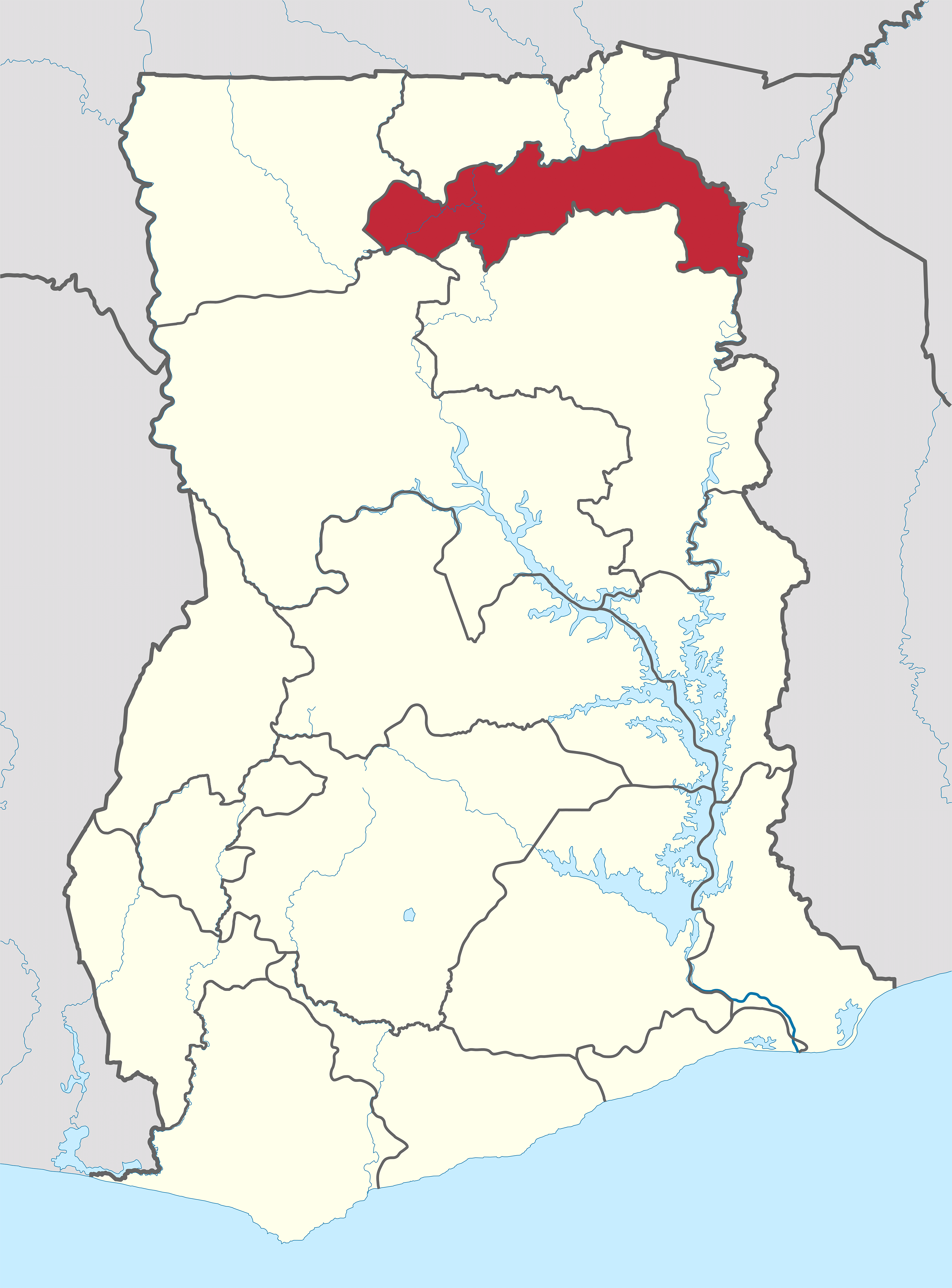
- District: East Mamprusi Municipal Assembly
- Region: North East Region of Ghana

Current constituency
- Party: New Patriotic Party
- MP: Mumuni Mohammed

Nalerigu is one of the constituencies represented in the Parliament of Ghana. It elects one Member of Parliament (MP) by the first past the post system of election. Nurideen Mumuni Muhammed is the member of parliament for the constituency. It is located in the North East Region of Ghana.

He succeeded Alhaji Seidu Issifu Baba. In 2016, he was elected on the ticket of the New Patriotic Party (NPP) and won with over 53% of the votes.

== See also ==
- List of Ghana Parliament constituencies
