= Wulugu =

- Location in Ghana
- Coordinates: 10°28′N 0°48′W
- Country: Ghana
- Region: North-East Region

Government

Wulugu is a town in the North East Region of Ghana carved from the old Northern Region. Its capital is Nalerigu. It is connected by road to the capital of the Northern Region, Tamale and the capital of the Upper East Region, Bolgatanga.

== Healthcare ==
The town has a health center. The health center in the community serves as a source of medical care for the residents of the town.

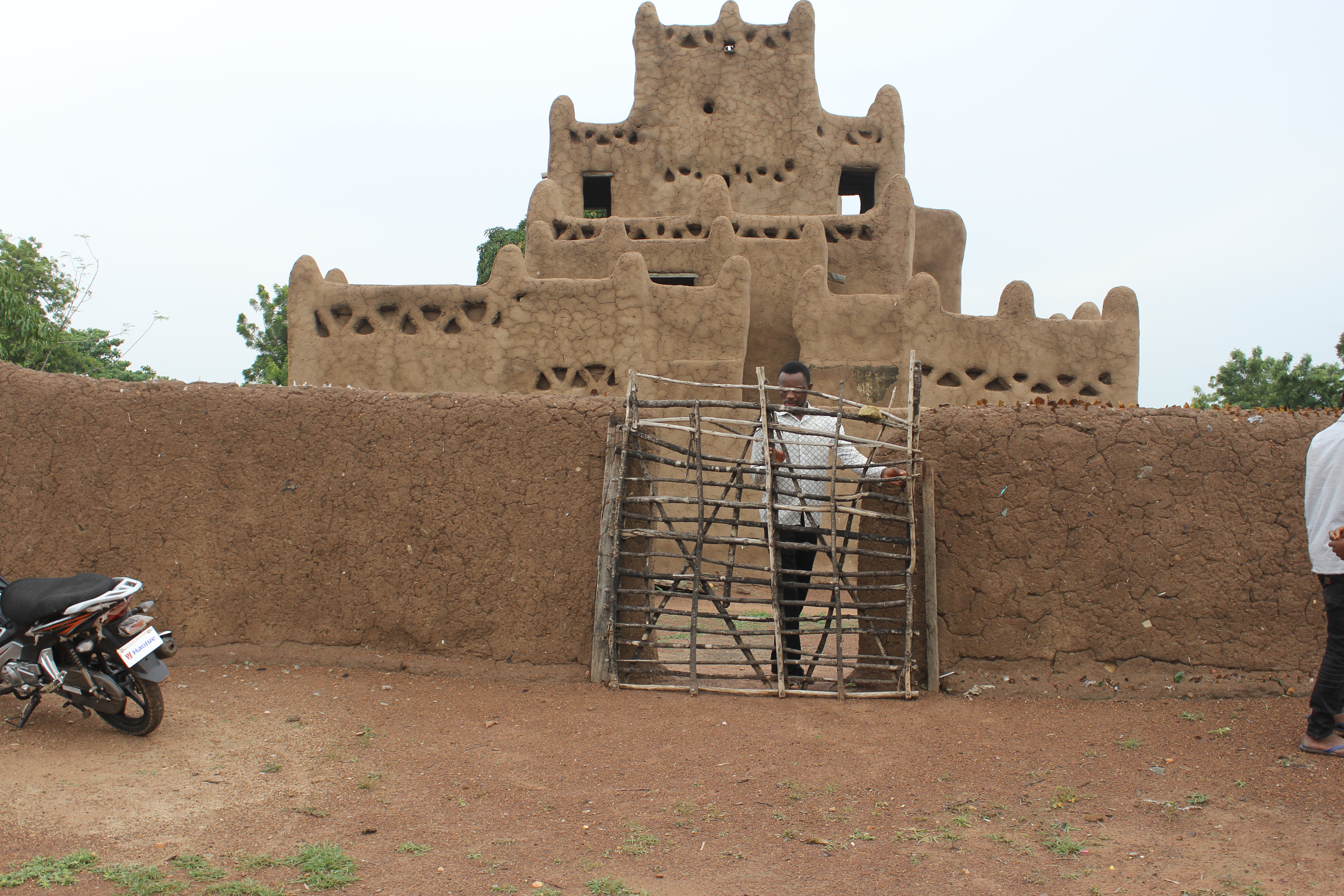
Zayaa Mud Mosque

== Geography ==
Wulugu is 194 meters above sea level where it is situated. Its coordinates are 10°28'27" North and 0°47'33" West, or 10.4742 and -0.7925 in DMS (Degrees Minutes Seconds) (in decimal degrees). Its Joint Operation Graphics reference is NC30-08, and its UTM position is YS45.

The sun rises at 08:09 and sets at 20:16 local time (Africa/Accra UTC/GMT+0). Wulugu's normal time zone is UTC/GMT+0. Distance from Tamale Municipal to Wulugu is 136 kilometers.

== See also ==
- Walewale
