= Nurideen Mumuni Muhammed =

Ghanaian politician and Member of Parliament

Hon. Nurideen Muhammed Mumuni MP

Member of Parliament for Nalerigu/Gambaga constituency
- Incumbent
- Assumed office January 2025

Personal details
- Born: July 16, 1987 (age 39) Gambaga, Ghana
- Party: New Patriotic Party
- Education: Kwame Nkrumah University of Science and Technology; Wisconsin International University College; Tamale Technical University
- Occupation: Politician

Nurideen Muhammed Mumuni (born 16 July 1987) is a Ghanaian politician and Member of Parliament for the Nalerigu/Gambaga Constituency in the North East Region of Ghana. He represents the New Patriotic Party (NPP) in the 9th Parliament of Ghana.

== Early life and education ==
Mumuni hails from Gambaga, Ghana. He obtained his Higher National Diploma (HND) in Marketing from Tamale Technical University in 2011. He went on to earn a Bachelor of Science degree in marketing from Wisconsin International University College in 2015 and a Master of Science in Project Management from the Kwame Nkrumah University of Science and Technology in 2019.

== Career ==
Before entering politics, Mumuni served as the Regional Director for the Youth Employment Agency, where he contributed to youth empowerment and development initiatives in northern Ghana. In the 2024 general elections, he was elected to the Parliament of Ghana on the ticket of the New Patriotic Party and is currently serving his first term as the Member of Parliament for Nalerigu/Gambaga. He serves on the Defence and Interior Committee, the House Committee, and is the Vice Chairperson of the Parliamentary Affairs Committee.

== See also ==
- List of MPs elected in the 2024 Ghanaian general election
- Parliament of Ghana
- New Patriotic Party
