= Duut (surname) =

Duut is a Dutch surname. Notable people with the surname include:

- Emmanuel Kwame Duut (born 1959), Ghanaian politician
- Henk Duut (born 1964), Dutch association football defender
- Michael Duut (born 1990), Dutch kickboxer
