= Adam Abu =

Ghanaian politician

Adam Abu is a Ghanaian politician and member of the New Patriotic Party. He is District Chief Executive of the Mamprugu-Moagduri District in Northern Region of Ghana.
