= Nakpanduri =

- Village
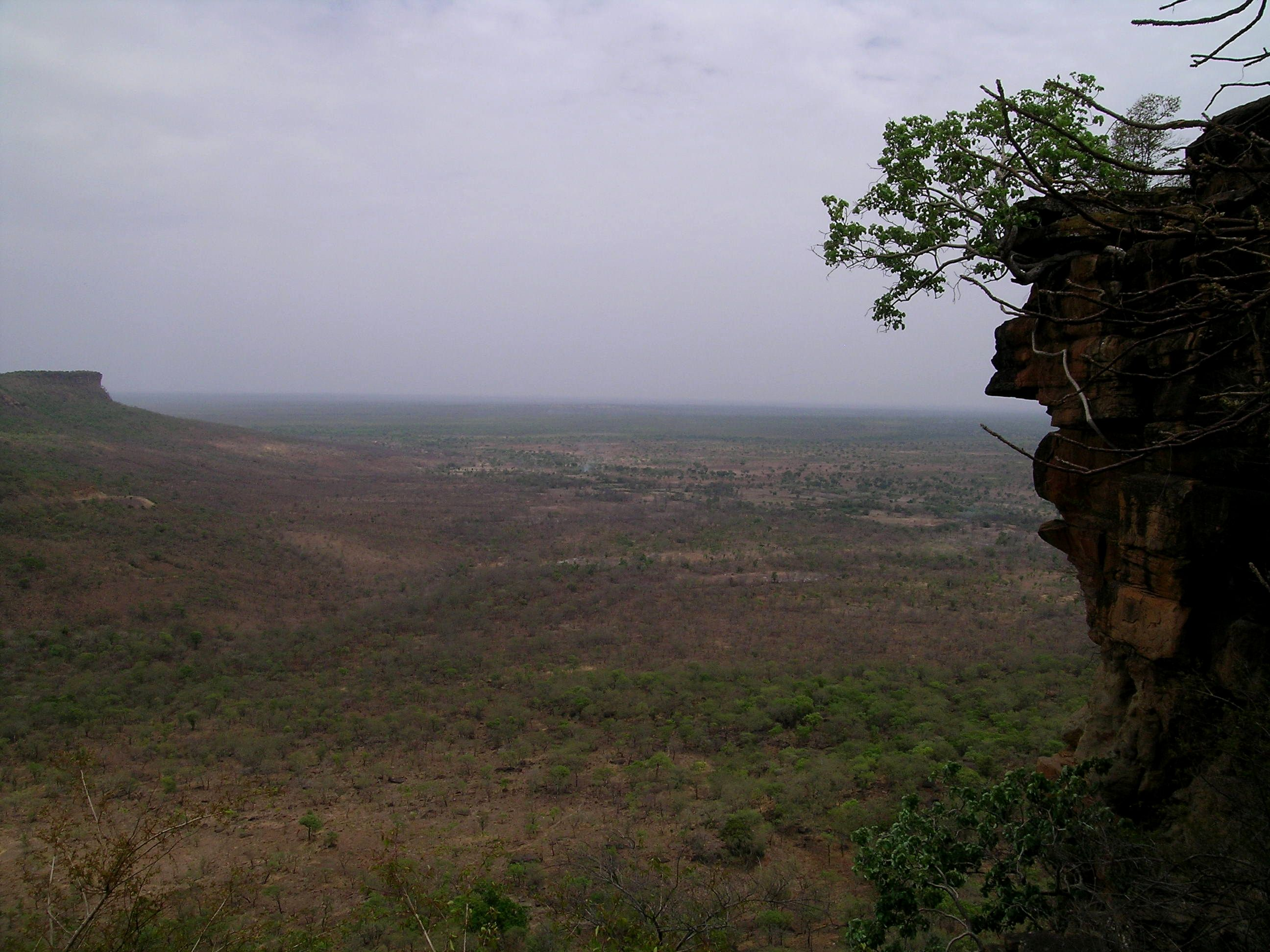
- Cliffs near Nakpanduri, Northern region

- Location of Nakpanduri in Northern region
- Coordinates: 10°37′58″N 0°10′58″W
- Country: Ghana
- Region: Northern Region
- District: Bunkpurugu-Yunyoo District
- Elevation: 1,362 ft (415 m)

Population (2013)
  - Total: —
- Time zone: GMT
  - Summer (DST): GMT

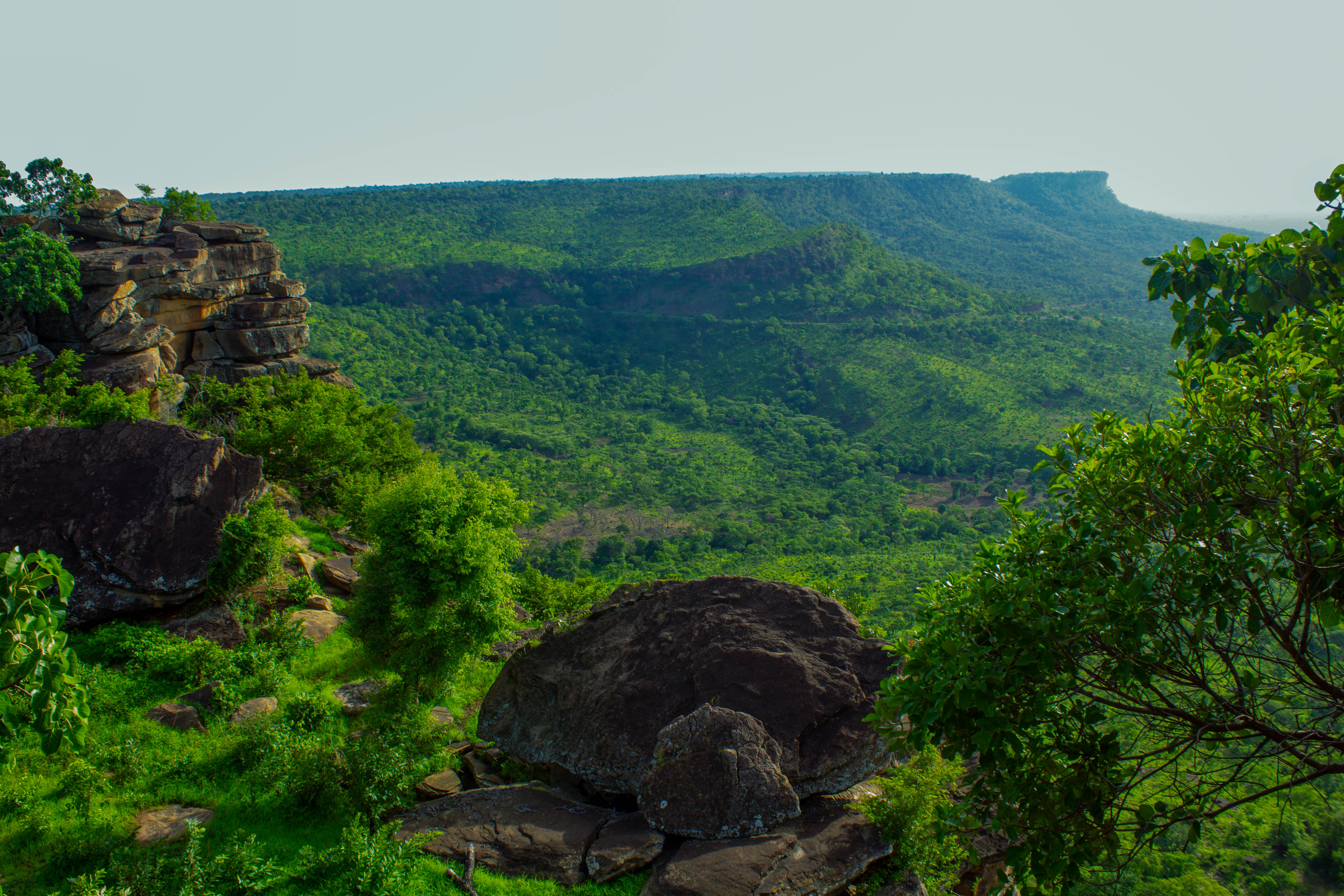
Napkanduri

Nakpanduri is a village in Bunkpurugu-Nakpanduri District, a district in the North East Region of north Ghana adjacent to the border with Togo.
