= Solomon Namliit Boar =

Ghanaian politician (born 1968)

Hon. Solomon Namliit Boar

Former Member of Parliament, Former North East Regional Minister
- In office 2013–2021
- President: Nana Akuffo-Addo

Personal details
- Born: 15 July 1968 (age 58) Bunkpurugu, Ghana
- Party: New Patriotic Party
- Spouse: Married
- Children: 5
- Education: Tamale Secondary School
- Alma mater: University of Cape Coast; Kwame Nkrumah University of Science and Technology
- Occupation: Farmer, Legislator, Politician and Social Worker.
- Profession: Administrator/Social Worker

Solomon Namliit Boar (born 15 July 1968) is a Ghanaian politician who served as a Member of Parliament for Bunkpurugu from 2017 to 2021. He is a member of the New Patriotic Party and served as the first Regional Minister of the newly-created North East Region of Ghana. He was also a deputy Northern Regional Minister from 2017 until the creation of the Northeast Region.

== Early life and education ==
He hails from Bunkpurugu, a town in the Northeast Region of Ghana. He studied at the University of Cape Coast, and obtained his Bachelor of Arts degree in management studies in 2007. He also attended the Kwame Nkrumah University of Science and Technology, where he obtained his Executive Master of Business Administration (CEMBA) degree in 2012. GIMPA /> Executive Master from the Institute of Paralegal Studies, Accra.

== Politics ==
Namliit Boar is a member of the New Patriotic Party and represented the Bunkpurugu constituency in the North East Region in the Seventh Parliament of the Fourth Republic of Ghana.

=== 2016 election ===
He contested the Bunkpurugu constituency parliamentary seat on the ticket of the New Patriotic Party during the 2016 Ghanaian general election and won with 14,590 votes, representing 49.07% of the total votes. He was elected over Anthony B. Gingon of the National Democratic Congress who polled 14,306 votes, which is equivalent to 48.12%, IND parliamentary candidate Namuburr Berrick who had 656 votes representing 2.21%, and the parliamentary candidate for the Convention People's Party Nawang David Monipaak had 180 votes, representing 0.61% of the total votes.

==== 2020 election ====
Namliit Boar again contested the Bunkpurugu (Gbana parliament constituency) on the ticket of the New Patriotic Party during the 2020 Ghanaian general election but lost the election to Bandim Abed- Nego Azumah of the National Democratic Congress.

==== Deputy Minister ====
In March 2017, President Nana Akufo-Addo named Boar one of the ten deputy regional ministers who would form part of his government. He was vetted by the Appointments Committee of the Parliament of Ghana in the same month. The committee approved him and his name was forwarded to Speaker of Parliament for further approval by the general house of parliament.

== Personal life ==
Boar is a Christian (Baptist). He is married (with five children).

== Employment ==
- Finance and Administrative Manager, New Energy, Tamale
- Manager/administrator/HR practitioner
