= Yagaba =

- District Capital
- Location in Ghana
- Coordinates: 10°13′58.8″N 01°17′1.6″W
- Country: Ghana
- Region: North East Region
- District: Mamprugu Moagduri District
- District Capital: 28 June 2012
- Seat: Yagaba-Kubori constituency

Government
  - Type: District Assembly
  - Body: Mamprugu Moagduri District Assembly
  - Chief Executive: Abu Adam
- Elevation: 252 m (827 ft)
- Time zone: GMT
  - Summer (DST): GMT
- Ghana Post GPS: NM
- Area code: +233 37 21

Yagaba is the capital of the Mamprugu Moagduri District in the North East Region of Ghana. The district was inaugurated on 28 June 2012.

Yagaba is located at the western end of the North East Region. Its elevation is 252 metres above sea level. It lies on the road running from Tamale, capital of the Northern Region to Sandema in the Builsa North Municipal District of the Upper East Region. Towns towards the north include Wiasi, Bechisi and Fumbisi. About 6 nautical miles to the east lies Bima. Kunchalan is 10 nautical miles south east of Yagaba. To the south lies Kubori and Monkaringa. To the west is Isiasi on the road towards Wa, capital of the Upper West Region.

== See also ==
- Yagaba-Kubori (Ghana parliament constituency)
