= Yunyoo-Nasuan District =

- District
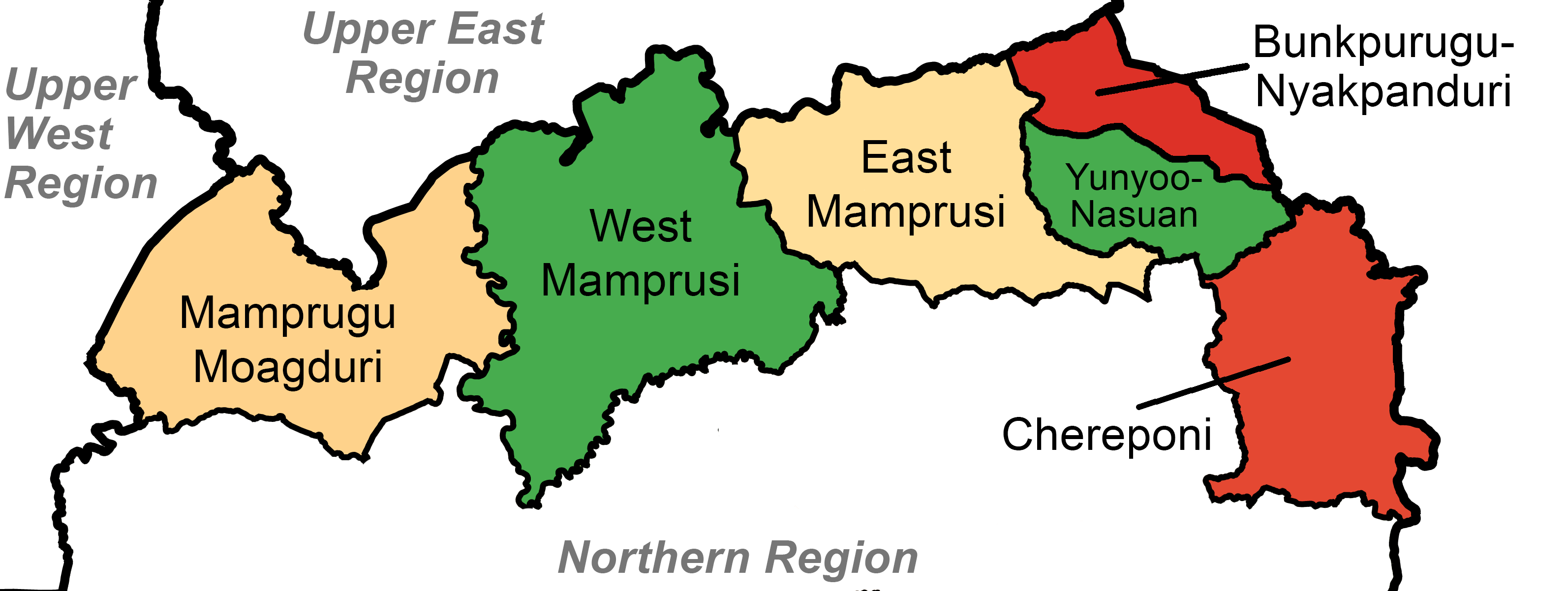
- Districts of North East Region

- Location of Yunyoo-Nasuan District within North East
- Coordinates: 10°29′2.4″N 0°0′32.4″W
- Country: Ghana
- Region: North East
- Capital: Yunyoo

Population (2021)
  - Total: 56,879
- Time zone: UTC+0 (GMT)
- ISO 3166 code: GH-NE-YN

Yunyoo-Nasuan District is one of the six districts in North East Region, Ghana. Originally it was formerly part of the then-larger Bunkpurugu-Yunyoo District on 19 August 2004, which was created from the former Mamprusi District Council, until the southern part of the district was split off to create Yunyoo-Nasuan District on 15 March 2018; thus the remaining part has been renamed as Bunkpurugu-Nyankpanduri District. The district assembly was located in the northeast part of Northern Region and had Yunyoo as its capital town.
