= Emmanuel Kwame Duut =

Ghanaian politician

Hon. Emmanuel Kwame Duut

Member of Ghana Parliament for Bunkpurugu-Yunyoo Constituency
- In office 7 January 2009 – 6 January 2013
- Preceded by: Joseph Yaani Labik

Personal details
- Born: 6 June 1959 (age 67) Najong, Northern Region, Ghana)
- Party: National Democratic Congress
- Children: 9
- Education: University of Education, Winneba
- Occupation: Politician
- Profession: Teacher

Emmanuel Kwame Duut (born 6 June 1959) is a Ghanaian politician and a member of the Fifth Parliament of the Fourth Republic of Ghana representing the Bunkpurugu-Yungoo Constituency in the Northern Region of Ghana.

== Early life and education ==
Duut was born on 6 June 1959 in Najong, in the Northern Region of Ghana. He attended the University of Education, Winneba (UEW) in 2004 and obtained Bachelor of Education (B.Ed.).

== Career ==
He was the Assistant Headmaster for the Bunkpurugu-Yunyoo Senior High School and a member of parliament for the Bunkpurugu-Yunyoo Constituency (2009-2013).

== Politics ==
He was first elected into parliament on the ticket of the National Democratic Congress(NDC) during the December 2008 Ghanaian general election as the member of Parliament for the Bunkpurugu-Yunyoo Constituency in the Northern Region of Ghana. During the 2008 election, he polled 9,205 votes out of the 32,078 valid votes cast representing 28.7%. He contested again in the 2012 Ghanaian general election and was defeated by Solomon Namliit Boar, a member of the New Patriotic Party who obtained 10,829 votes representing 38.85%. He served only one term as a parliamentarian.

== Personal life ==
He is married with nine children. He is a Christian and a member of the Catholic Church.
