= Mamprugu-Moagduri District =

- District
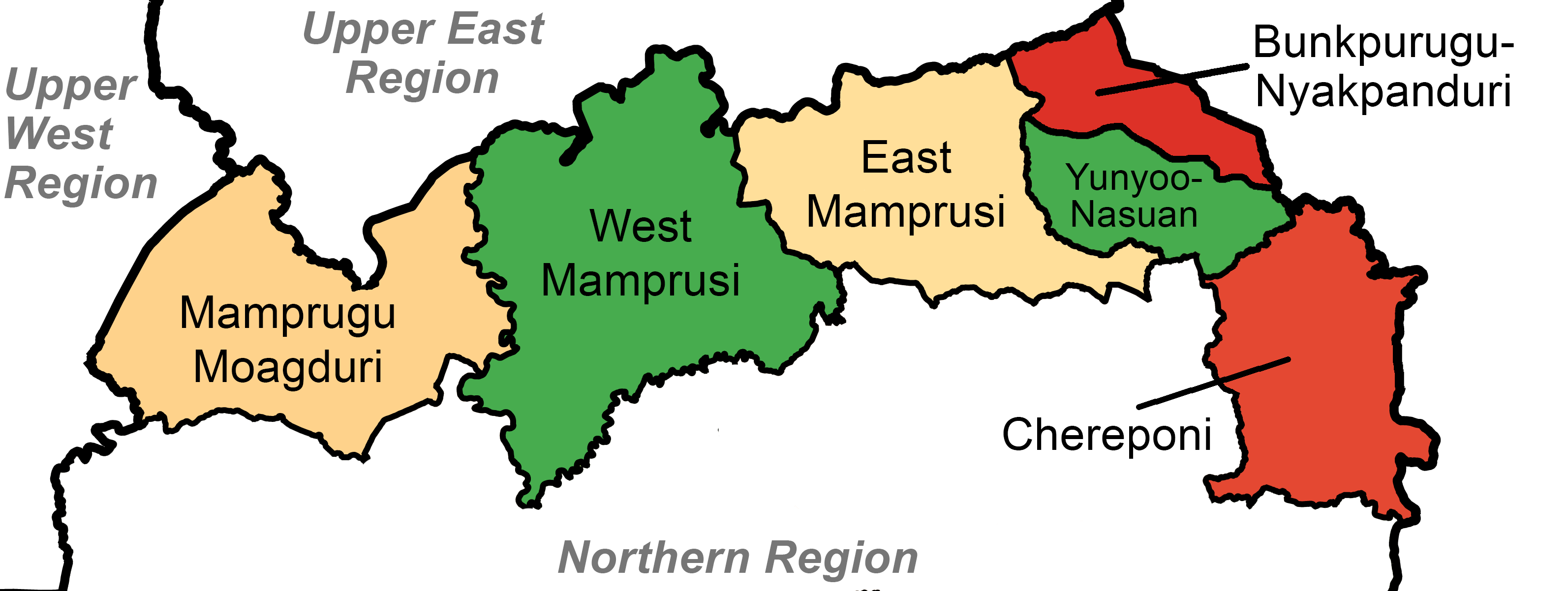
- Districts of North East Region

- Location of Mamprugu-Moagduri District within North East
- Coordinates: 10°13′58.44″N 1°17′0.96″W
- Country: Ghana
- Region: North East
- Capital: Yagaba

Population (2021)
  - Total: 68,746
- Time zone: UTC+0 (GMT)
- ISO 3166 code: GH-NE-MM

Mamprugu-Moagduri District is one of the six districts in North East Region, Ghana. Originally it was formerly part of a then-larger West Mamprusi District in 1988, which was created from the former Mamprusi District Council, until the western part of the district was split off on 28 June 2012 to create Mamprugu-Moagduri District; thus the remaining part was still has been retained West Mamprusi District (which it was elevated to municipal district assembly status on 18 March 2018 to become West Mamprusi Municipal District). The district assembly is located in the western part of North East Region and has Yagaba as its capital town.

== Geography ==
Yagaba serves as the capital of the Mamprugu Moagduri District, which spans 2,150 square kilometers and is situated between latitudes 9°55'N and 10°35'N and longitudes 0°35'W and 1°45'W.

Other settlements in the district include:

- Loagri
- Kunkua
- Katigri
- Kpatarigu
- Yizesi
- Jadema
- Yanamoa
- Kubugu
- Kubori
- Gunbong
- Soo
- Tantala
- Gbima
- Nangurima
- Goriba
- Zanwara
- Buguyiga
- Kikaayiri
- Yikpabongu
- Prima
- Kubagna
- Yirangu
- Santa
- Tuvuu
- Garigu
- Zukpeni
- Jaari
- Sakpaba
- Kusobi
- Litcher
- Wuntubri
- Muugu
- Tando
- Zanloo
- Wuyima
- Yizebisi
- Dabozesi
- Siisi
- Soo-Namoa
- Aaba
- Kantim
- Kuaba
- Biyori

== Population ==
As of 2021, the population was 68,746, of which 34,053 were male and 34,693 were female.
