= Nalerigu =

Capital town of North East Region, Ghana

- Regional Capital
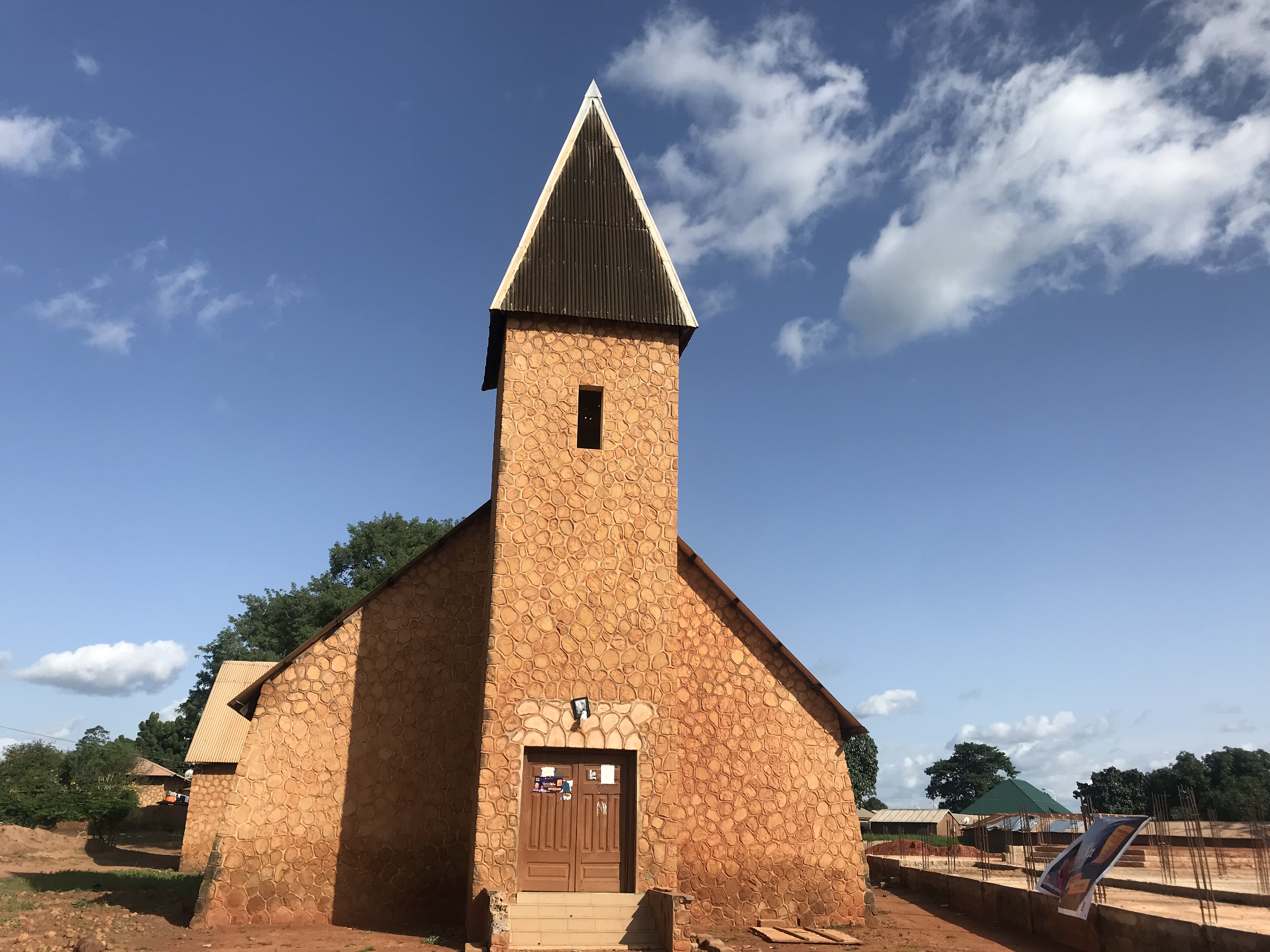
- An old church at Nalerigu

- Location in Ghana
- Coordinates: 10°32′N 0°22′W
- Country: Ghana
- Region: North East Region
- District: East Mamprusi Municipal

Government
  - NaYiri: Na Bɔhagu Mahami Sheriga
- Elevation: 1,099 ft (335 m)

Population (2010)
  - Total: 14,927
  - Ethnicities: MamprusiBissa/Busanga; Bimoba; Konkomba; Tallensi; Mossi; Chakosi (Anufo); Hausas
  - Religions: Islam; Christianity; African Traditional Religion
- Time zone: GMT

Nalerigu is the largest town in the East Mamprusi Municipal. It is home to the overlord of the kingdom of Mampurugu (NaYiri). With the addition of 6 new regions in 2018, Nalerigu was declared the capital of the North East Region of Ghana.

== History ==
Photos of Naa Jeringa wall
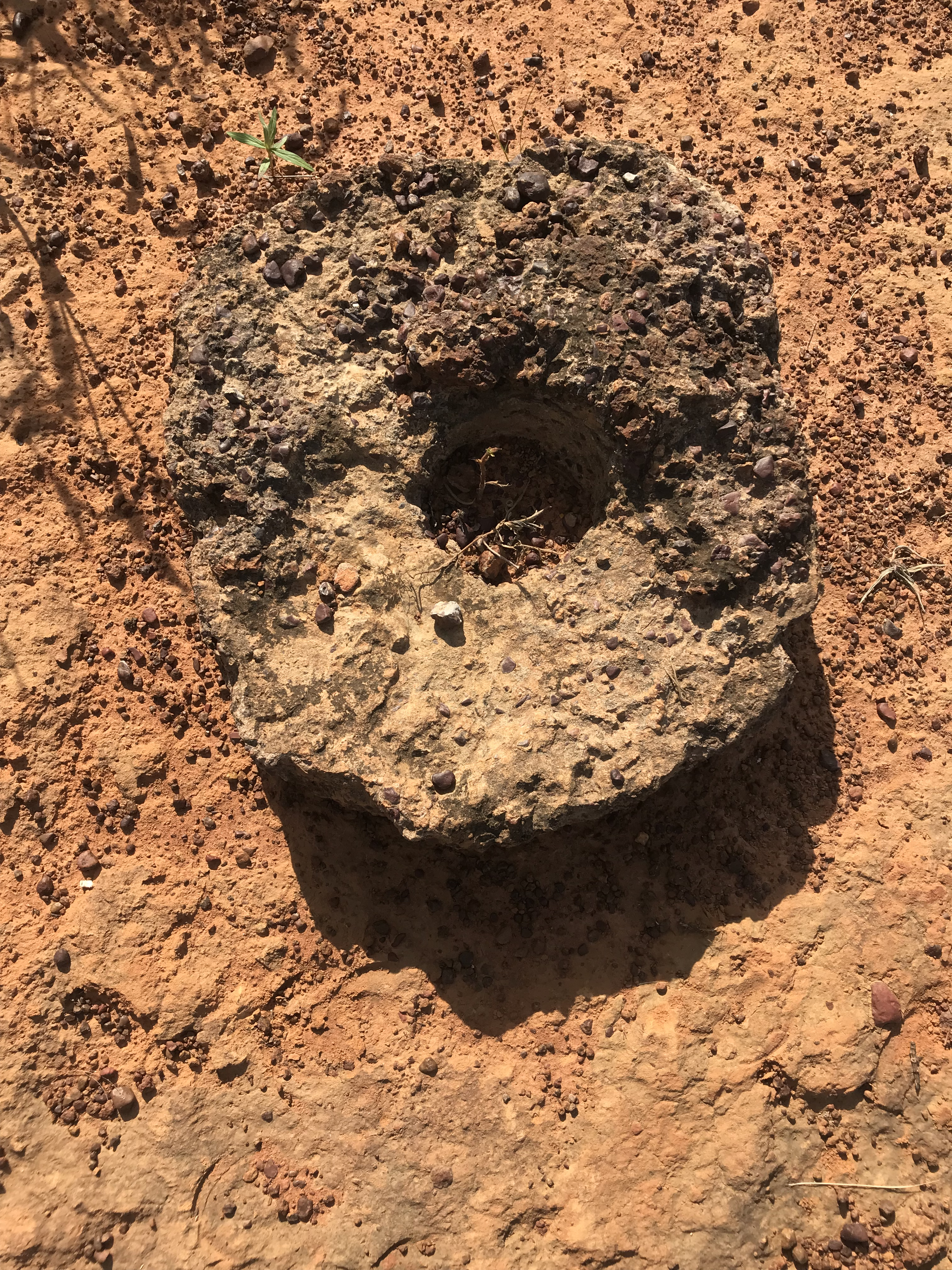
a pillar that used to hold the Naa Jeringa wall in Nalerigu

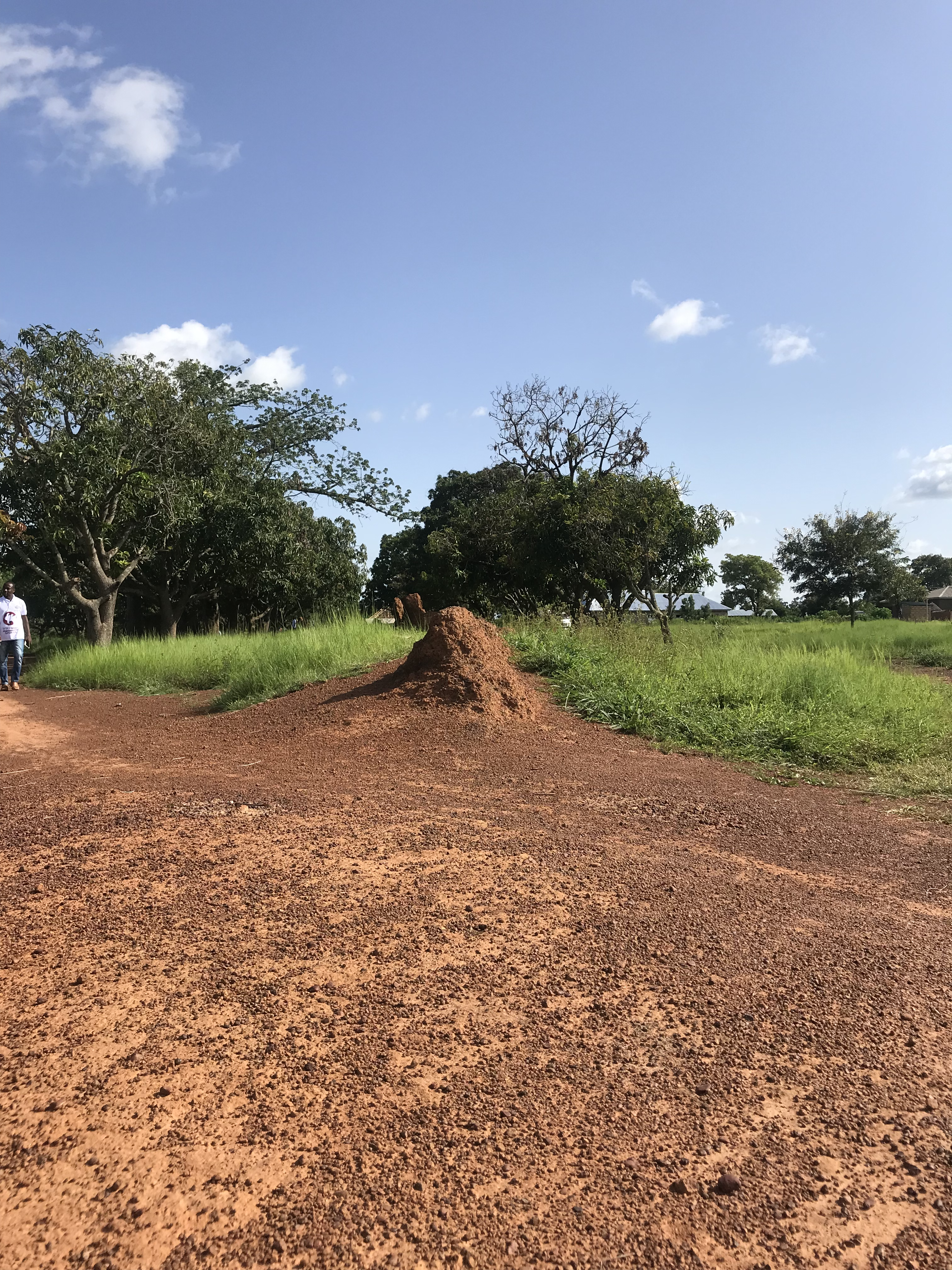
sideview of the Naa Jeringa wall

Nalerigu was the capital of the Mamprugu Kingdom, one of the earliest known states in the northern area of what is now present-day Ghana. During the 16th century, a series of walls was built by Naa Jaringa using stones and mud all around the town. It was built to protect the town against slave raiders since they were located close to the historic slave route between Ouagadougou (Burkina Faso) and Djenne (Mali).

== Education ==
Nalerigu is the education hub of the region. The town is home to the College of Health Sciences and the Nalerigu Secondary School (NASS).

== Health ==
It is home to the location of a private hospital, the Baptist Medical Centre. It was established in 1958 and currently serves over 200 patients a day. It is the main hospital serving the entire region.

== Points of interest ==
- Doves Caves (Ŋmana Feeri), group of rocky outcrops
- NaYiri Palace, home to the overlord of mampurugu kingdom.
- Naa Jeringa Wall, remains of the walls whose surrounded the town during the 16th century

== Notable people ==
- Isaac Kolibilla Batesimah, politician
- Issifu Seidu, politician

== See also ==
- Bunkpurugu
- Walewale
