= Bunkpurugu Nakpanduri District =

- District
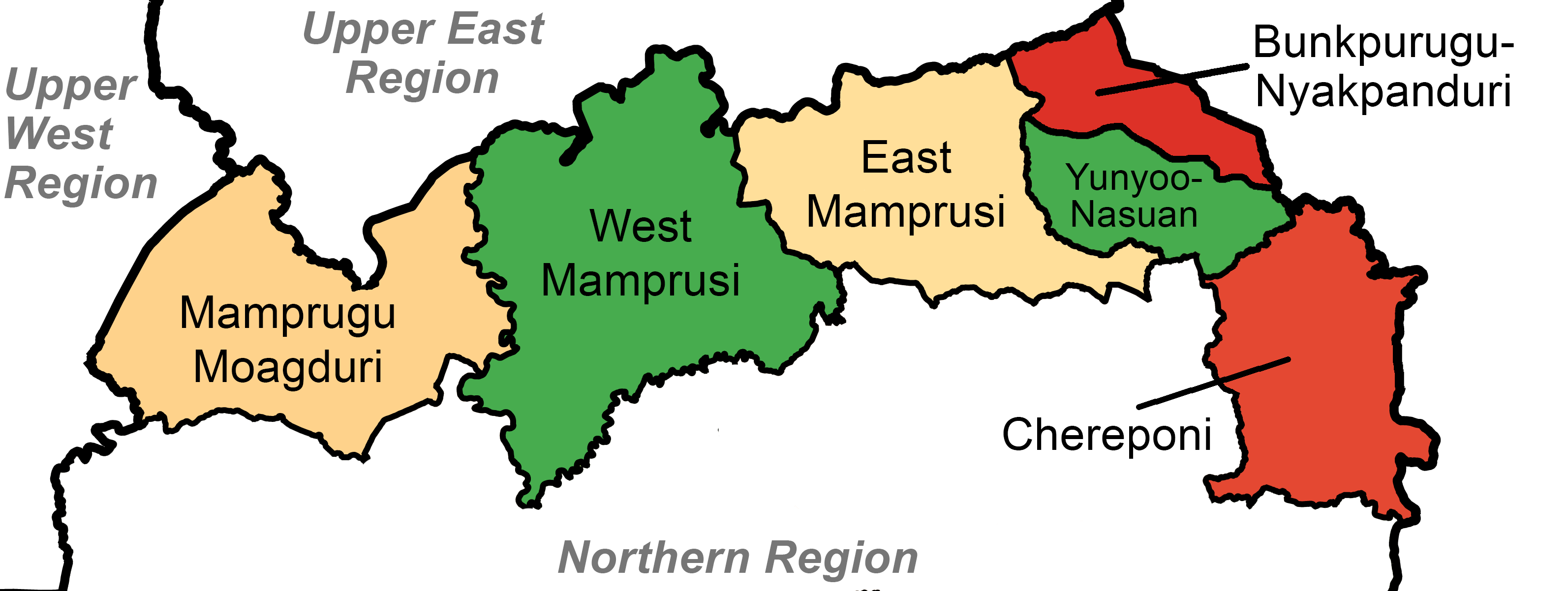
- Districts of North East Region

- Location of Bunkpurugu Nakpanduri District within North East
- Coordinates: 10°30′45.72″N 0°5′52.8″E
- Country: Ghana
- Region: North East
- Capital: Bunkpurugu
- Established: 19 August 2004

Area
  - Total: 1,257.1 km^{2} (485.4 sq mi)

Population (2021)
  - Total: 82,384
- Time zone: UTC+0 (GMT)
  - Summer (DST): GMT
- ISO 3166 code: GH-NE-BN

Bunkpurugu-Nakpanduri District is one of the six districts in North East Region, Ghana. Originally it was formerly part of the then-larger Bunkpurugu-Yunyoo District on 19 August 2004, which was created from the former Mamprusi District Council, until the southern part of the district was split off to create Yunyoo-Nasuan District on 15 March 2018; thus the remaining part has been renamed as Bunkpurugu-Nakpanduri District. The district assembly was located in the northeast part of Northern Region and had Bunkpurugu as its capital town.
