= Joseph Yaani Labik =

Ghanaian politician

Hon. Joseph Yaani Labik

Member of Parliament for Bunkpurugu-Yunyoo Constituency
- In office 7 January 1997 – 6 January 2001
- President: Jerry John Rawlings

Member of Parliament for Bunkpurugu-Yunyoo Constituency
- In office 7 January 2005 – 6 January 2009
- President: John Kufuor

Personal details
- Born: 2 June 1954 (age 72)
- Party: Independent Candidate
- Education: University of Ghana, School of Social Work
- Profession: Community Development Officer

Joseph Yaani Labik is a Ghanaian Politician and a Community Development Officer. He served as a Member of Parliament for the Bunkpurugu-Yunyoo constituency in the Northern Region. He is an independent candidate with no political party affiliations.

== Early life and education ==
Labik was born on 2 June 1954. He studied at the University of Ghana where, he obtained a Higher National Diploma in social work.

== Career ==
Labik is a community development officer by profession.

== Political career ==
Labik was the Member of Parliament for the Bunkpurugu-Yunyoo constituency of the Northern Region of Ghana in the 1st, 2nd, 3rd and 4th Parliament of the 4th Republic of Ghana.

== Elections ==
Labik was elected as the member of parliament for the Bunkpurugu-Yunyoo constituency of the Northern Region of Ghana for the first time in the 1992 Ghanaian general elections. In 2004, he won as an independent candidate. He was the only independent candidate that won the election in the Northern Region.

He was elected with 8,436 votes out of 31,880 total valid votes cast equivalent to 26.5% of total valid votes cast. He was elected over Dubik A. Saman of the People's National Convention, Dubik Mahama Yakubu of the New Patriotic Party, Namburr Berrick of the National Democratic Congress, Duut Martin Kombian of the Convention People's Party, Joseph Bipoba Naabu an independent candidate. These obtained 7.8%, 22.8%, 21.3%, 1.4% and 20.2% respectively of total valid votes cast.

Labik was first sworn into parliament on 7 January 1993 after he emerged winner at the 1992 Ghanaian General Elections. In the 1996 Ghanaian General Elections, he retained his after defeating David Dubique Konlaa of the Convention People's Party by obtaining 63.90% of the total valid votes cast which is equivalent to 26,017 votes while David obtained 8.70% which is equivalent to 3,547 votes.

== Personal life ==
He is a Christian.
