= Walewale =

- District Capital
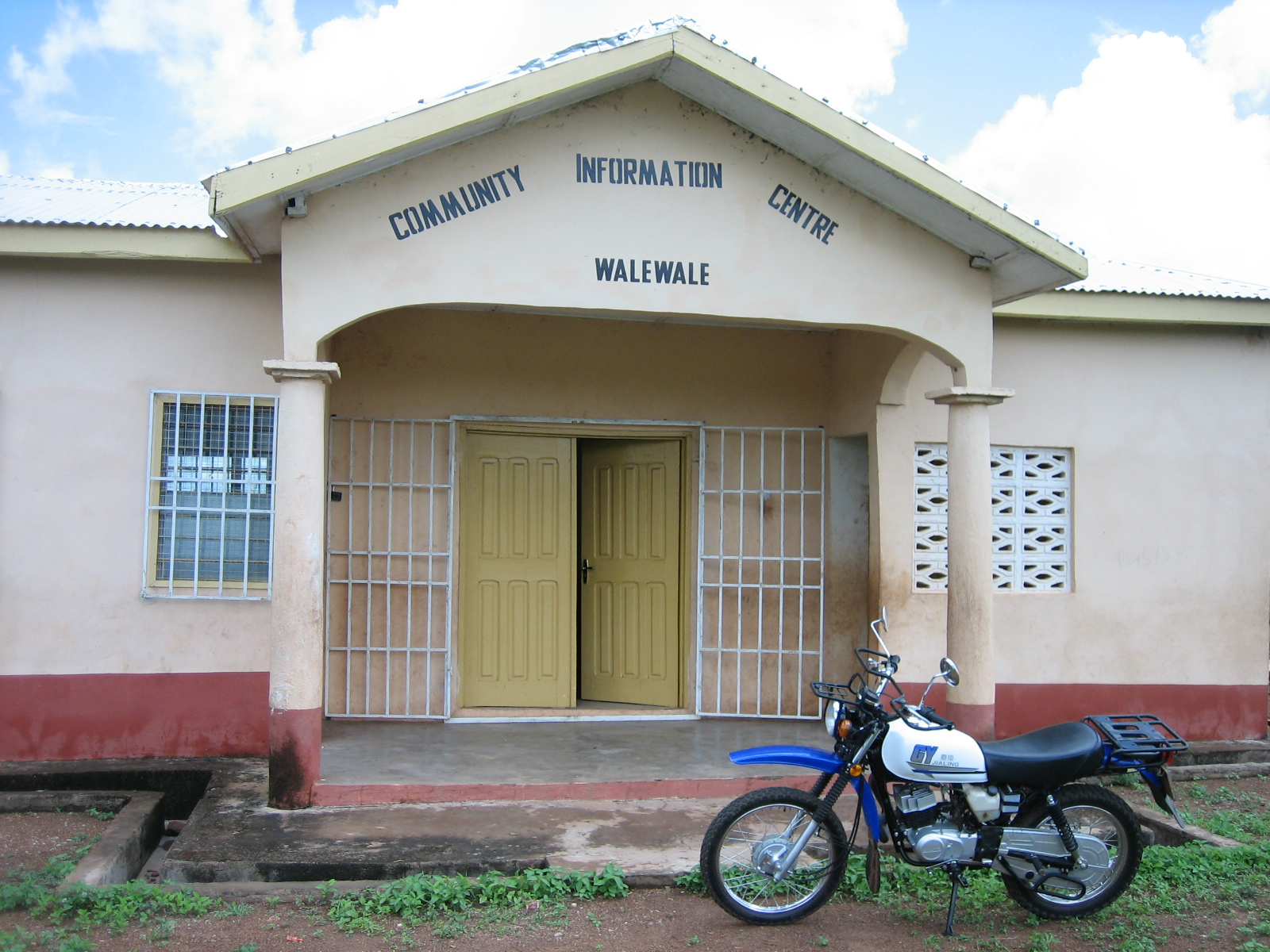
- Walewale Community Information Center

- Location of Walewale in North East Region
- Coordinates: 10°21′N 0°48′W
- Country: Ghana
- Region: North East Region
- District: West Mamprusi District
- Elevation: 545 ft (166 m)

Population (2013)
  - Total: —
- Time zone: GMT
  - Summer (DST): GMT

Walewale is a town and the capital of Mamprusi West Municipal in the North East Region of Ghana. The West Mamprusi Municipal is one of the 261 Metropolitan, Municipal, and District Assemblies (MMDAs) in Ghana, and forms part of the 6 MMDAs in the North East Region. The West Mamprusi Municipality is one of 45 new districts created in 1988 under the Government of Ghana's decentralization and was later replaced with LI 2061 in 2012. With its administrative capital as Walewale.

== Location ==
The Municipality is located within longitudes 0°35’W and 1°45’W and Latitude 9°55’N and 10°35’N. It has a total land size area of 2,596sq km. It shares boundaries with East Mamprusi Municipal and Gushegu Municipal to the east; North Gonja District, Savelugu Municipal and Kumbungu District to the south; Builsa North District, Kassena-Nankana Municipal and Bolgatanga Municipal (Upper East Region) to the north and to the west, Mamprusi Moagduri District. It lies on the main road from Bolgatanga to Tamale, at the junction of the road west to Nalerigu, the capital of the newly created North East Region.

== Population ==
The population of the Municipality according to 2021 population and housing census stands at 175,755 with 85,712 males and 90,043 females. It was founded by the Mamprusis. The language spoken by the people of Walewale is largely Mampruli, which is followed by Kassim, Guruni, Moshie.

== Religion ==
The dominant religion is Islam, but a lot of churches have emerged in recent times. Walewale mosque, built in 1961 on the site of an earlier mud-and-stick mosque, is notable for its Moorish tower.

== Economy ==
Walewale prides itself of four standard banks which are; Ghana Commercial Bank, Agricultural Development Bank, Bangmarigu Community Bank and GN Bank which is currently defunct. The town has about ten standard guest houses with two five-star hotels located along the main road leading to Bolgatanga, the Upper East Regional capital.

Walewale has two radio stations, Eagle FM and Wale FM running on the frequencies 94.1(MHz), 106.9 (MHz) respectively which broadcast in English and the local language; Mampruli. They also have radio sessions broadcast in Frafra and other local languages. The town is also one of the municipalities to have benefited from the Zongo Ministry's artificial pitches. This makes the community suitable in hosting any tournament in the newly created North East Region.

== Climate ==
Climate in Walewale
Month	Average temperature range		Notes
Month	From	To	Notes
January	19.6 °C (67.3 °F)	36.5 °C (97.7 °F)	A particularly warm winter month, . The average high temperature in January is essentially the same as it was in December: 36.5°C (97.7°F), which is still extremely hot.
February	22.3 °C (72.1 °F)	39.2 °C (102.6 °F).	The final month of winter; another extremely hot month.
March	25.9 °C (78.6 °F)	41 °C (105.8 °F)	The first month of spring, is scorching, with relative humidity is around 23%.
April	28.5 °C (83.3 °F)	41 °C (105.8 °F)	A similarly hot spring month like March. The two warmest months, with average highs of 41 °C (105.8 °F), are March and April. In April, the relative humidity is typically 33%.
May	28.5 °C (83.3 °F)	39.5 °C (103.1 °F).	End of spring; another extremely hot month. The average high temperature in May is a scorching 39.5 °C (103.1 °F), which is essentially the same as it was in April.
June	26.3 °C (79.3 °F)	37.2 °C (99 °F).	June is the first month of summer, it is also swelteringly hot, with The average high temperature remains hot at 37.2 °C (99 °F), which is around the same as May.
July	24.3 °C (75.7 °F)	33 °C (91.4 °F)	A tropical summer month similar to June. The average maximum temperature falls to a warm 33 °C (91.4 °F).
August	23 °C (73.4 °F)	30.8 °C (87.4 °F)	August marks the end of summer, it is also a hot month. With an average high temperature of 30.8 °C (87.4 °F) and an average low temperature of 23 °C (73.4 °F), August is the coldest month. August's average heat index is predicted to be a scorching 40 °C (104 °F).
September	The average high temperature is a fairly constant 32.4 °C (90.3 °F).		The first month of autumn; still a tropical month, with typical highs and lows between 32.4 °C (90.3 °F) and 23.4 °C (74.1 °F).
October	24.5 °C (76.1 °F)	35.6 °C (96.1 °F)	A scorching autumn month.
November	24.1 °C (75.4 °F)	37.5 °C (99.5 °F)	The final month of autumn; it is also a hot month.
December	20.5 °C (68.9 °F)	36.2 °C (97.2 °F).	

== Health ==
Walewale can boast of its over 100-bed health facility known as Walewale Municipal Hospital that is enhanced with three ambulances. The town also has two health facilities in addition to the Municipal hospital. These facilities are Our Lady of Rocio clinic and Mandela Healthcare center. The town is also the central point of the Zipline drones used for medical purposes. The Zipline Medical drone Center is currently an operational drone center in Ghana, and it is meant to serve all five northern Regions.
