= East Mamprusi Municipal Assembly =

District in North East region, Ghana

East Mamprusi Municipal District
- District
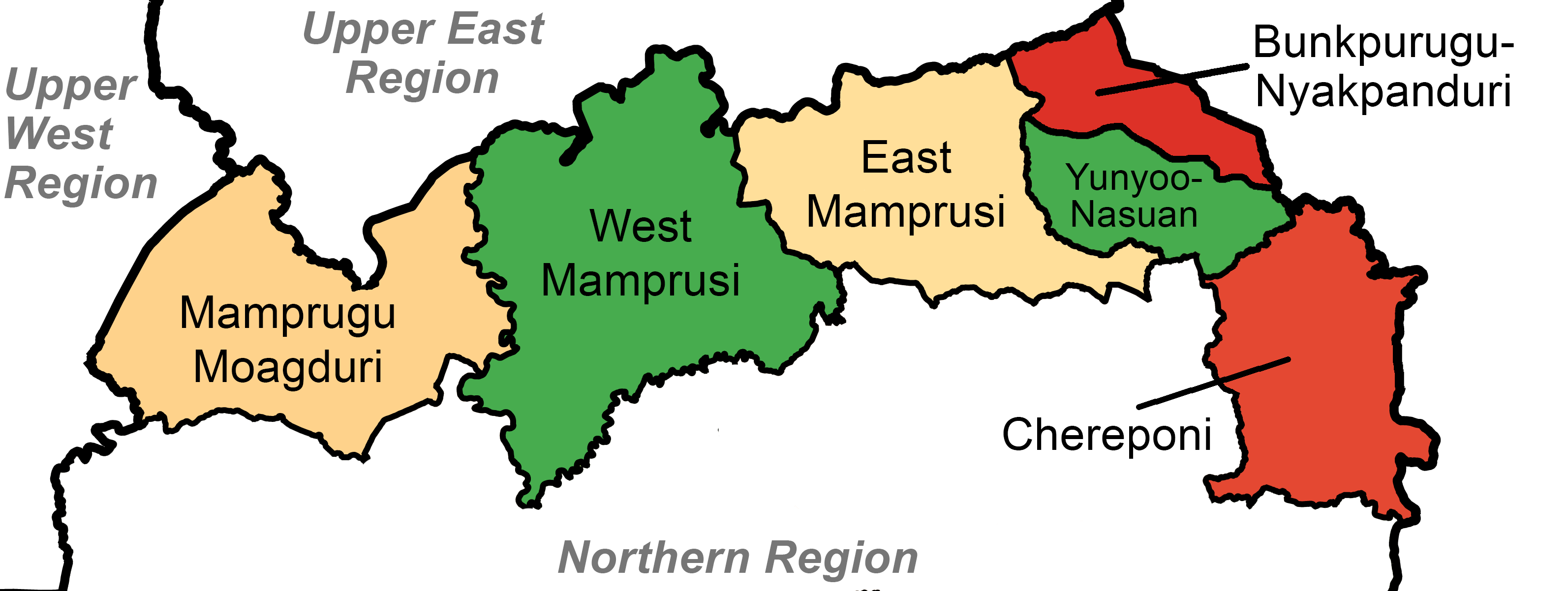
- Districts of North East Region

- Location of East Mamprusi Municipal District within North East
- Coordinates: 10°31′50″N 0°26′32″W
- Country: Ghana
- Region: North East
- Capital: Gambaga

Government
  - Municipal Chief Executive: David Bariche Bukari

Area
  - Total: 1,706.8 km^{2} (659.0 sq mi)

Population (2021)
  - Total: 188,006
- Time zone: UTC+0 (GMT)
- ISO 3166 code: GH-NE-EM

East Mamprusi Municipal Assembly is one of the six districts in North East Region, Ghana.

Originally created as an ordinary district assembly in 1988 when it was known as East Mamprusi District, which was created from the former Mamprusi District Council, until the eastern part of the district was split off by a decree of President John Agyekum Kufuor on 19 August 2004 to create Bunkpurugu-Yunyoo District; thus the remaining part has been retained as East Mamprusi District. However, on 15 March 2018, it was elevated to municipal district assembly status to become East Mamprusi Municipal District. The municipality is located in the eastern part of the North East Region and has Gambaga as its capital town.

== Area ==
It covers a land mass of 1,706.8 km².

== Geographical Structure ==
The municipality shares boundaries with Talensi District, Nabdam District, Bawku West District and Garu District, all in the Upper East Region to the north. To the east lies Bunkpurugu Nyankpanduri District, while West Mamprusi Municipal District borders it to the west. Gushegu Municipal District and Karaga District form its southern boundary.

== Political and Administrative Structure ==
The municipality is administered through the Nalerigu Town Council, three Area Councils (Langbinsi, Sakogu and Gbintri), and 36 Unit Committees. The District Assembly has 36 elected members, 15 Government appointees, one Member of Parliament, and a Municipal Chief Executive (MCE) who is the executive and administrative head of the District. The MCE is assisted by the Municipal Coordinating Director and the technical staff of the assembly.

== Cultural and Social Structure ==
The Nayiri is the overlord of the Mamprugu Traditional Area and is assisted by a council of elders. The Nayiri is supported by paramount chiefs, divisional and other sub-chiefs under him. His paramountcies extend beyond the boundaries of the municipality and are located in other regions and districts. Notable among the chiefs are the Wulugu Naaba, Wungu Naaba, Soo Naaba, Kulgu Naaba and Gambaga Naaba.

Mamprusi people are the major ethnic group in the municipality. However, there are also Bimobas, Konkombas, Talensis, Mossis, Chakosis and Hausas who have settled in the area. Two traditional festivals are celebrated annually: the Damba festival and the Bugum Chugu (Fire Festival).

== Tourism ==
The district has some tourist attraction sites such as:

- The Gambaga Escarpment and White Volta River which stretch across the northern boundary of the district
- The NaYiri Palace also in Nalerigu
- NaJeringa Defense Wall
- Mossi chiefs' ancestral grave sites in Gambaga
- The pre-historic Gingana rock paintings

== Economy ==
The municipality has three major markets located at Gbintiri, Nalerigu and Langbinsi, which serve as important commercial centres and sources of internally generated revenue for the municipal assembly. The main means of transportation for the people are motor bikes, bicycles as well as commercial vehicles.
