= West Mamprusi Municipal Assembly =

District in North East region, Ghana

West Mamprusi Municipal District
- District
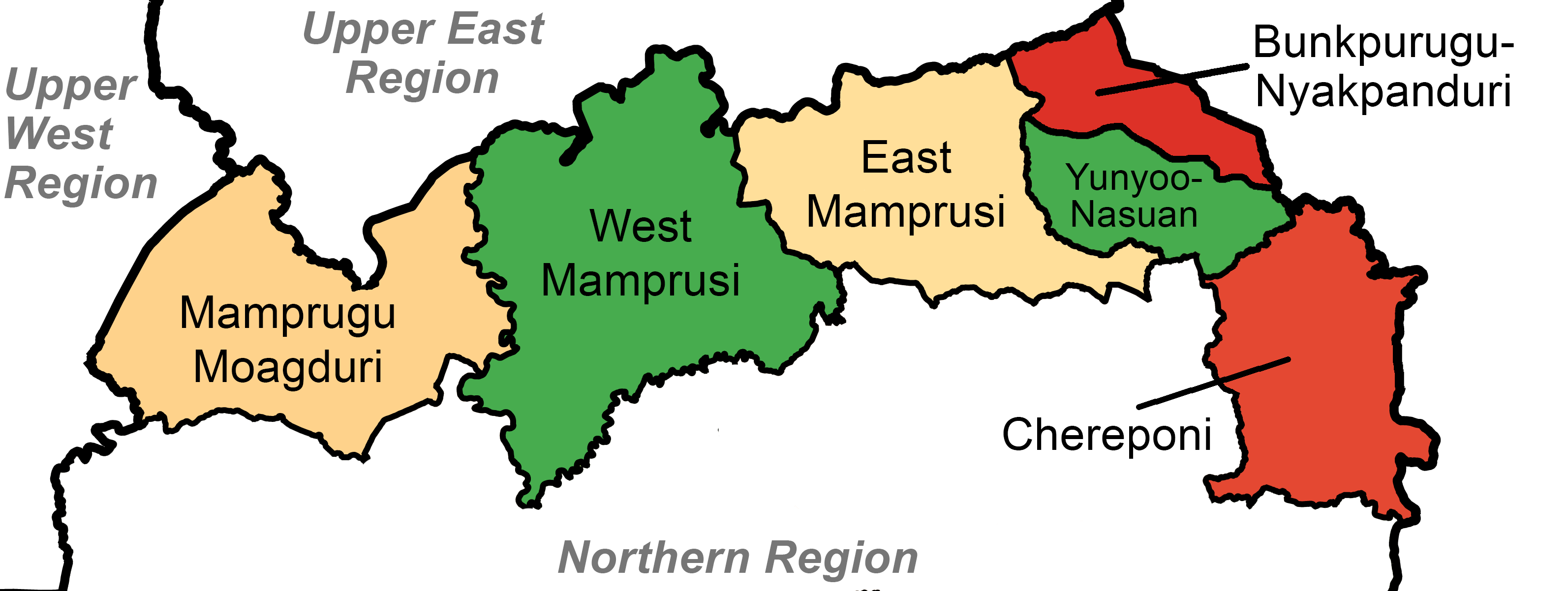
- Districts of North East Region

- Location of West Mamprusi Municipal District within North East
- Coordinates: 10°21′7.2″N 0°47′56.4″W
- Country: Ghana
- Region: North East
- Capital: Walewale

Government
  - Municipal Chief Executive: Arimyaw Somo Lucky

Area
  - Total: 4,892 km^{2} (1,889 sq mi)

Population (2021)
  - Total: 175,755
- Time zone: UTC+0 (GMT)
- ISO 3166 code: GH-NE-WM

West Mamprusi Municipal Assembly is one of the six districts in North East Region, Ghana. Originally created as an ordinary district assembly in 1988 when it was known as West Mamprusi District, which was created from the former Mamprusi District Council, until the western part of the district was split off on 28 June 2012 to create Mamprugu-Moagduri District; thus the remaining part has been retained as West Mamprusi District. However, on 15 March 2018, it was elevated to municipal district assembly status to become West Mamprusi Municipal District. The municipality is located in the western part of North East Region and has Walewale as its capital town. Other settlements within the municipal assembly include Wulugu.

== Geography ==
The Municipality is located within longitudes 0°35’W and 1°45’W and Latitude 9°55’N and 10°35’N. It has a total land size area of 2610.44 km^{2}.

It shares boundaries with East Mamprusi Municipal and Gushegu Municipal to the east; North Gonja District, Savelugu Municipal and Kumbungu District to the south; Builsa North District, Kassena-Nankana Municipal and Bolgatanga Municipal (Upper East Region) to the north and to the west, Mamprusi Moagduri District.

== Population ==
The population of the Municipality according to 2021 population and housing census stands at 175,755.

== History ==
Before the creation of the 20 districts, in 1988, West Mamprusi District was part of the 48 districts that were created under the government of Ghana's decentralization and local government reform policy. The district was carved out of the old Gambaga District in the Northern Region.

== Location ==
The districts' administrative capital can be located along the Tamale-Bolgatanga road, 109 kilometres (68 mi) away from Tamale. It is bordered to the north by Builsa, Kasena-Nankana and Bolgatanga Districts, in the Upper East Region; to the south by North Gonja, Karaga, Kumbungu and Savelugu Districts in the Northern Region; to the west by the Sissala East and Wa East Districts; and to the East by East Mamprusi Municipal Assembly.

== Culture and Ethnicity ==
The Mamprusi make up around 75% of the district's overall population and are the majority of those who live there. This dominant ethnic group coexists harmoniously with minor groups such as the Builsa (4.7%), Frafra (2.7%), Kasena (2.2%),

the Dagomba (1.8%), and some other ethnic groups in Ghana. The "Bugun" (fire festival) and "Damba" festivals are the two most significant traditional festivals observed in the district.

Islam (79.4%), Christianity (15.6%), and Traditionalists (3.7%) are the three major prevalent religions.

== Member of Parliament (MPs) ==
LIST OF MPs FROM 1993 - 2025
NAMES	YEAR	POLITICAL PARTY
Saibu Ben Baluri	1993 – 1997 (1st Parliament)	NDC
Adam Susanna	1997 – 2001 (2nd Parliament)	NDC
Azumah Alhaji Issifu	2001 – 2005 (3rd Parliament)	PNC
Iddrisu Zakari Alidu	2005 – 2009 (4th Parliament)	NDC
Iddrisu Zakari Alidu	2009 – 2013 (5th Parliament)	NDC
Sagre Bambangi	2013 – 2017 (6th Parliament)	NPP
Sagre Bambangi	2017 – 2021 (7th Parliament)	NPP
Abudu Zuweira Lariba	2021 – 2024 (8th Parliament)	NPP
Dr.Tiah Abdul-Kabiru Mahama	2025 – 2029 (9th Parliament)	NPP
