= Namong =

- Country: Ghana
- Region: Ashanti Region

Namong is a town in the Ashanti Region of Ghana. The town is known for the Namong Secondary School. The school is a second cycle institution.

The town is in Offinso south municipality
