= Namburr Berrick =

Ghanaian politician

Hon. Namburr Berrick

Member of Parliament for Bunkpurugu/Yunyoo Constituency
- In office 7 January 2001 – 6 January 2005
- President: John Kufuor

Personal details
- Party: National Democratic Congress
- Profession: Politician

Namburr Berrick is a Ghanaian politician and was the member of parliament for the Bunkpurugu/Yunyoo constituency in the Northern region of Ghana. He was a member of parliament in the 3rd parliament of the 4th republic of Ghana.

== Politics ==
Berrick is a member of the National Democratic Congress. He was elected as the member of parliament for the Bunkpurugu/Yunyoo constituency in the Northern region in the 3rd parliament of the 4th republic of Ghana. He was succeeded by Joseph Yaani Labik in the 2004 Ghanaian General elections.

In the 2016 elections, Berrick decided to part company with his former party the National Democratic Congress and contested as an independent parliamentary candidate.

Berrick was elected as a member of parliament for the Bunkpurugu/Yunyoo constituency in the 2000 Ghanaian general elections. He was elected on the ticket of the National Democratic Congress. His constituency was a part of the 16 parliamentary seats out of 21 seats won by the National Democratic Congress in that election for the Northern Region. The National Democratic Congress won a minority total of 92 parliamentary seats out of 200 seats in the 3rd parliament of the 4th republic of Ghana.He was elected with 7,251 votes out of 29,139 total valid votes cast. This was equivalent to 25.80% of the total valid votes cast. He was elected over Labik Joseph Yaani and Elizabeth P. Poyari - two independent candidates, James Lamisi Nawang of the People's National Convention, David Dubique Konlaa of the New Patriotic Party, Thomas Akar Gyimah of the National Reform Party and Komong A. Elijah of the Convention People's Party. These obtained 6,206, 4,224, 3,779, 2,141and 304 votes respectively. These were equivalent to 22.10%, 15.00%, 15.00%, 13.40%, 7.60% and 1.10% respectively.
