= Yunyoo (Ghana parliament constituency) =

Constituency in Ghana

- constituency for the Parliament of Ghana
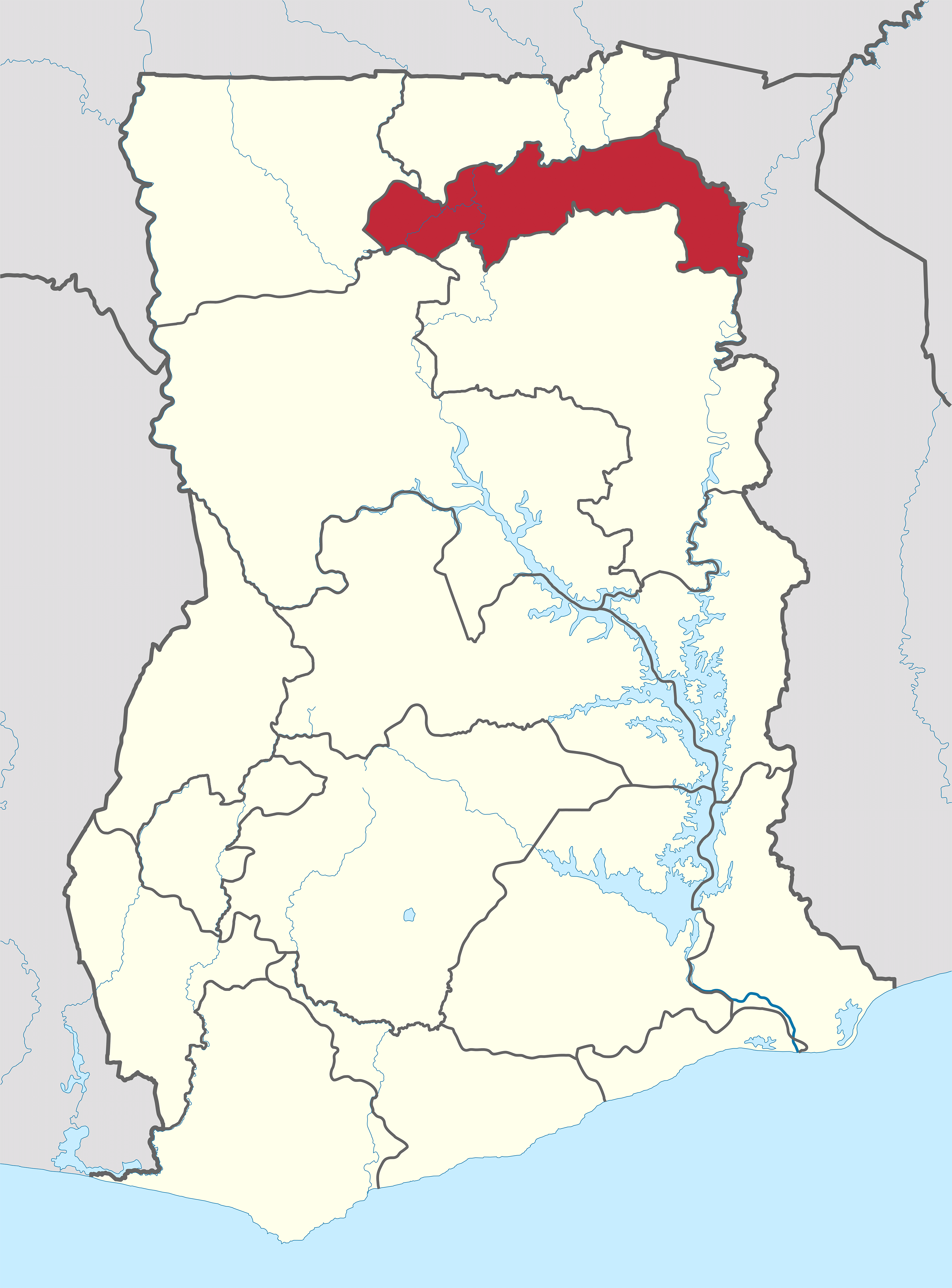
- District: Yunyoo- Nasuan District
- Region: North East Region of Ghana

Current constituency
- Party: National Democratic Congress
- MP: Alhassan Sulemana

Yunyoo is one of the constituencies represented in the Parliament of Ghana. It elects one Member of Parliament (MP) by the first past the post system of election. Alhassan Sulemana is the member of parliament for the constituency. Yunyoo is located in the Bunkpurugu-Yunyoo district of the North East Region of Ghana.

== Boundaries ==
The seat is located between the Bunkpurugu Nakpanduri, Cheriponi and East Mamprusi District of the North East Region of Ghana.

== Members of Parliament ==
Election	Member	Party
2012	Joseph Bipoba Naabu	National Democratic Congress
2016	Joseph Bipoba Naabu	National Democratic Congress
2020	Oscar Liwaa	New Patriotic Party
2024	Alhassan Sulemana	National Democratic Congress

== See also ==
- List of Ghana Parliament constituencies
