= Bunkpurugu-Yunyoo District =

- Former District
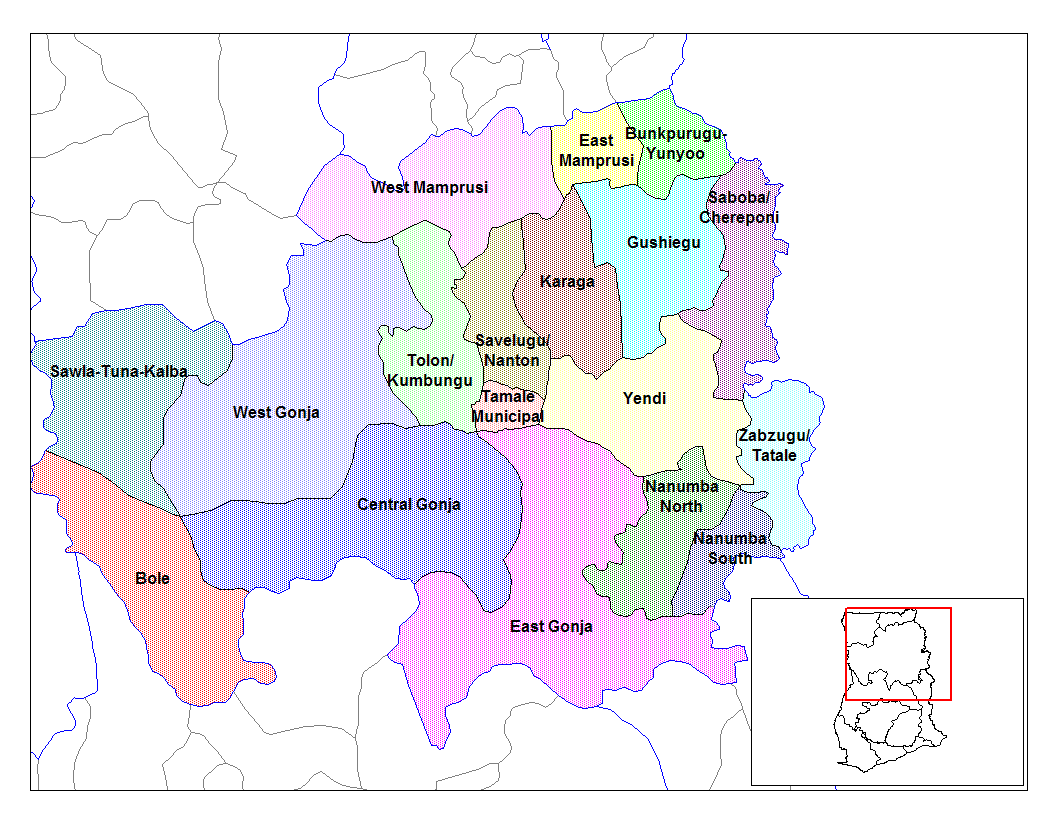
- Districts of Northern Region

- Location of Bunkpurugu-Yunyoo District within Northern
- Coordinates: 10°30′45.72″N 0°5′52.8″E
- Country: Ghana
- Region: Northern
- Capital: Bunkpurugu

Government
  - District Executive: Philip N. Laari

Population (2019)
  - Total: 151,737
- Time zone: UTC+0 (GMT)
- ISO 3166 code: GH-NP-BY

Bunkpurugu-Yunyoo District is a former district that was located in Northern Region, Ghana. Originally it was formerly part of the then-larger East Mamprusi District in 1988 (which it was elevated to municipal district assembly status on 18 March 2018 to become East Mamprusi Municipal District), which was created from the former Mamprusi District Council. However on 15 March 2018, it was split out into two new districts: Bunkpurugu-Nyankpanduri District (capital: Bunkpurugu) and Yunyoo-Nasuan District (capital: Yunyoo). The district assembly was located in the north east part of Northern Region and had Bunkpurugu as its capital town. It is currently part of the North East region of Ghana.

== See also ==
- "Districts of Ghana". Statoids.
