= Bunkpurugu =

- District Capital
- Nickname: B Town
- Location of Bunkpurugu in North East region
- Coordinates: 10°31′N 0°6′W
- Country: Ghana
- Region: North East region
- District: Bunkpurugu Nyankpanduri District

Government
  - Type: Monarchy
  - Chief: Alhaji Abuba Nasimong
- Elevation: 751 ft (229 m)

Population (2021)
  - Total: —
- Time zone: GMT
  - Summer (DST): GMT

Bunkpurugu is a small town and is the capital of Bunkpurugu Nakpanduri district, a district in the North East Region of Ghana adjacent to the border with Togo. It was formerly the capital of the Bunkpurugu-Yunyoo District.
