= Mamprusi District =

- Former District Council
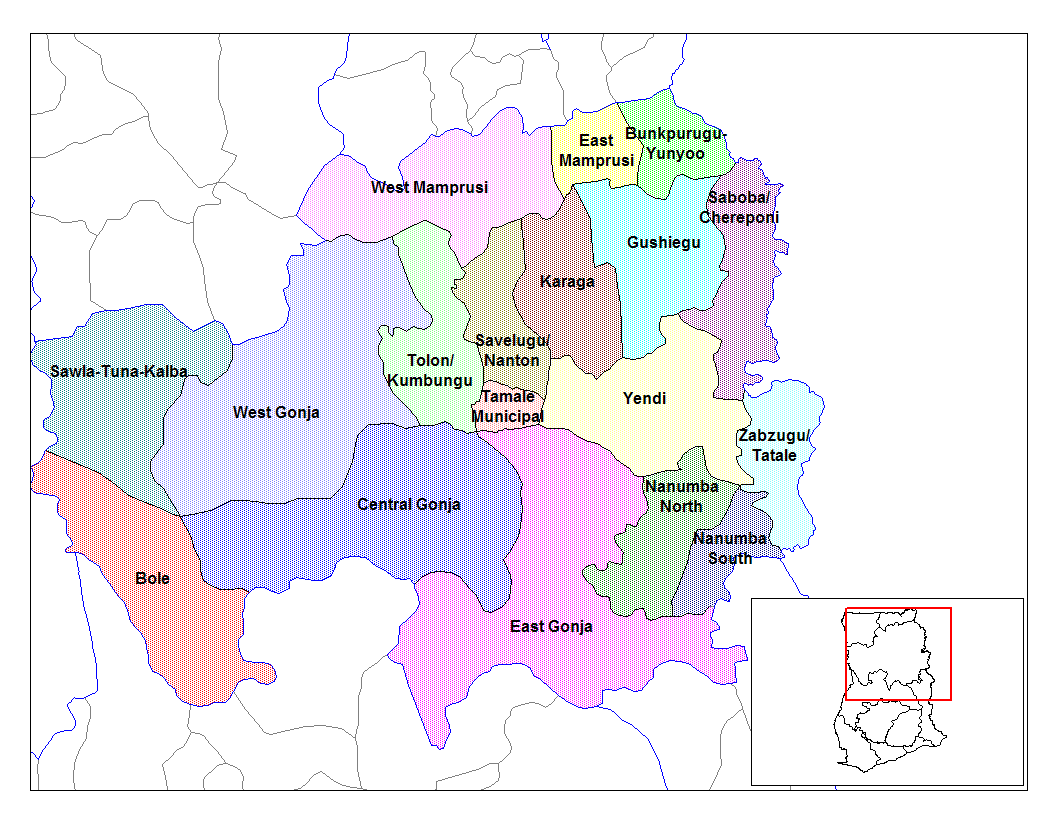
- Districts of Northern Region

- Location of Mamprusi District within Northern
- Coordinates: 10°31′50″N 0°26′32″W
- Country: Ghana
- Region: Northern
- Capital: Gambaga
- Time zone: UTC+0 (GMT)
- ISO 3166 code: GH-NP-__

Mamprusi District is a former district council that was located in North East Region, Ghana.

It was created as an ordinary district assembly in the Northern Region in 1975. In 1988 it was split into two new district assemblies: East Mamprusi District and West Mamprusi District. The district assembly was located in the northeast part of Northern Region and had Gambaga as its capital town.
