= North East Region, Ghana =

Region of Ghana

Coordinates: 10°31′N 0°22′W

North East Region
- Region
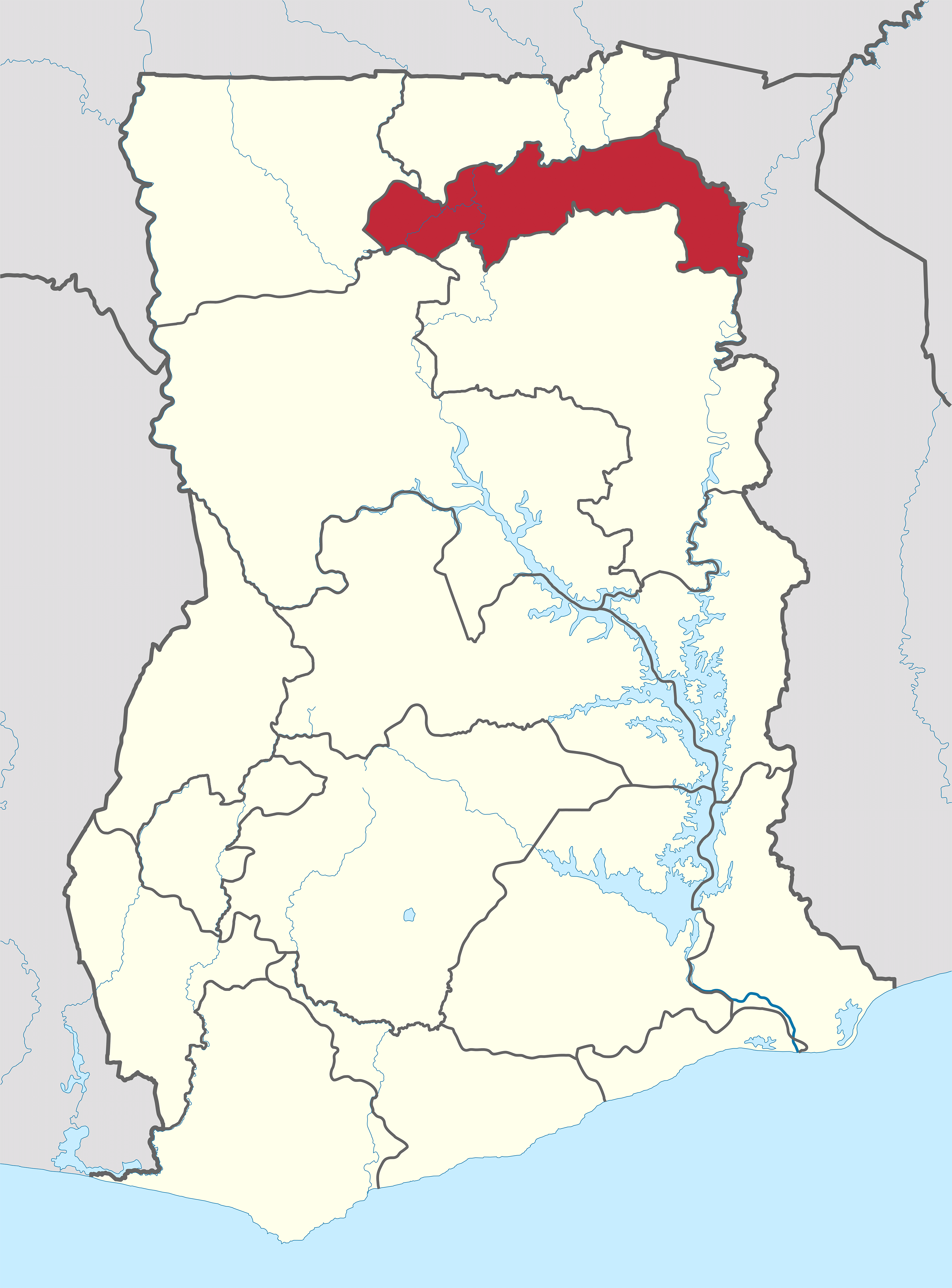
- Location of North East Region in Ghana
- Country: Ghana
- Capital: Nalerigu
- District: 6

Government
  - Regional Minister: Ibrahim Tia

Area
  - Total: 9,070 km^{2} (3,500 sq mi)

Population (2021)
  - Total: 658,903
  - Density: 72.6/km^{2} (188/sq mi)
- Time zone: GMT
- Area code: +233 37
- ISO 3166 code: GH-NP

The North East Region is one of the sixteen regions of Ghana. It is located in the north of the country and was created in December 2018 after a referendum was voted upon to break it off of the Northern region. The region's capital is Nalerigu.

== Creation of Region ==
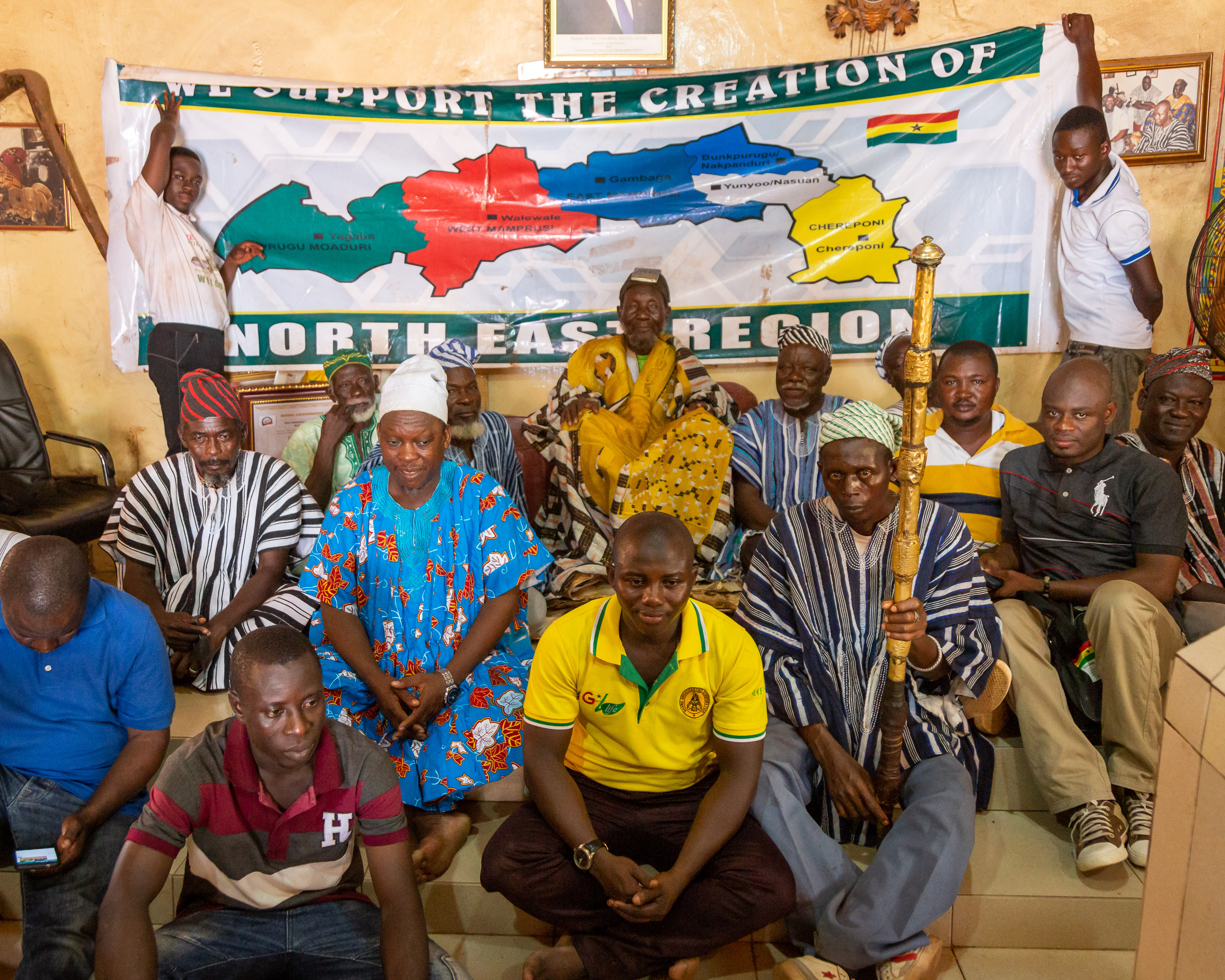
NaYiri shows his support for the North East Region

The North East Region of Ghana was a proposed new region to be carved out of the existing Northern Region of Ghana. The creation of this new region was in fulfillment of a promise made by the New Patriotic Party prior to the 2016 Ghana general election. Upon winning the elections, the President, Nana Akuffo Addo created the Ministry of Regional Reorganization to oversee policy formulation and implementation, and Hon. Solomon Namliit Boar, Mp for Bunkpurugu Constituency and former Deputy Northern Regional Minister was appointed as the first Regional Minister for the newly created North East Region. In all six new regions were to be created from the existing ten regions of Ghana. The other regions are Western North, Bono, Bono East, Ahafo, Savannah and Oti regions.

A referendum vote held on December 27, 2018 was successful with 81% voter turnout in the proposed region voting 99.8% in favor of the creation of the North East Region. The region's proposed capital is the town of Nalerigu in the East Mamprusi Municipal Assembly.

== Geography and climate ==
=== Location and size ===
The North East Region is bordered on the north by the Upper East region, on the east by the eastern Ghana-Togo international border, on the south by the Northern region, and on the west by the Upper West region. North East region is made up of 6 districts.

=== Climate and vegetation ===
The North East Region is much drier than southern areas of Ghana, due to its proximity to the Sahel, and the Sahara. The vegetation consists predominantly of grassland, especially savanna with clusters of drought-resistant trees such as baobabs or acacias. Between December and April is the dry season. The wet season is between about June and November with an average annual rainfall of 750 to 1050 mm (30 to 40 inches). The highest temperatures are reached at the end of the dry season, the lowest in December and January. However, the hot Harmattan wind from the Sahara blows frequently between December and the beginning of February. The temperatures can vary between 17 °C (63 °F) at night and 47 °C (117 °F) during the day.

== Cultural and Social Structure ==
The Nayiri is the King (overlord) of Mamprugu traditional area of which the entire region is a part. He has a traditional council of elders who advise him. The Nayiri is supported by paramount chiefs, divisional and other sub-chiefs under him. His paramountcy extend beyond the boundaries of the North East Region and even the nation. Notable among the chiefs are the Wulugu Naaba, Wungu Naaba, Soo Naaba, Kulgu Naaba, Yunyoorana and Bunkpurugu Naaba, Gbankoni Naaba, and Zuarungu Naaba, Tongu Naaba, Sakuti (all in Upper East Region).

Mamprusi people are the major ethnic group in the Municipality. However, there are also Dagombas, Bimobas, Konkombas, Talensis, Tampulma, Bissa, Mossis, Chakosis and Hausas who have settled in the area. Two traditional festivals are celebrated annually, Damba Festival, Bugum (Fire) Festival. The District is a multi-religious one with the dominant religions being Christianity, Islam and Traditional African Religion.

== Tourism and Attractions ==
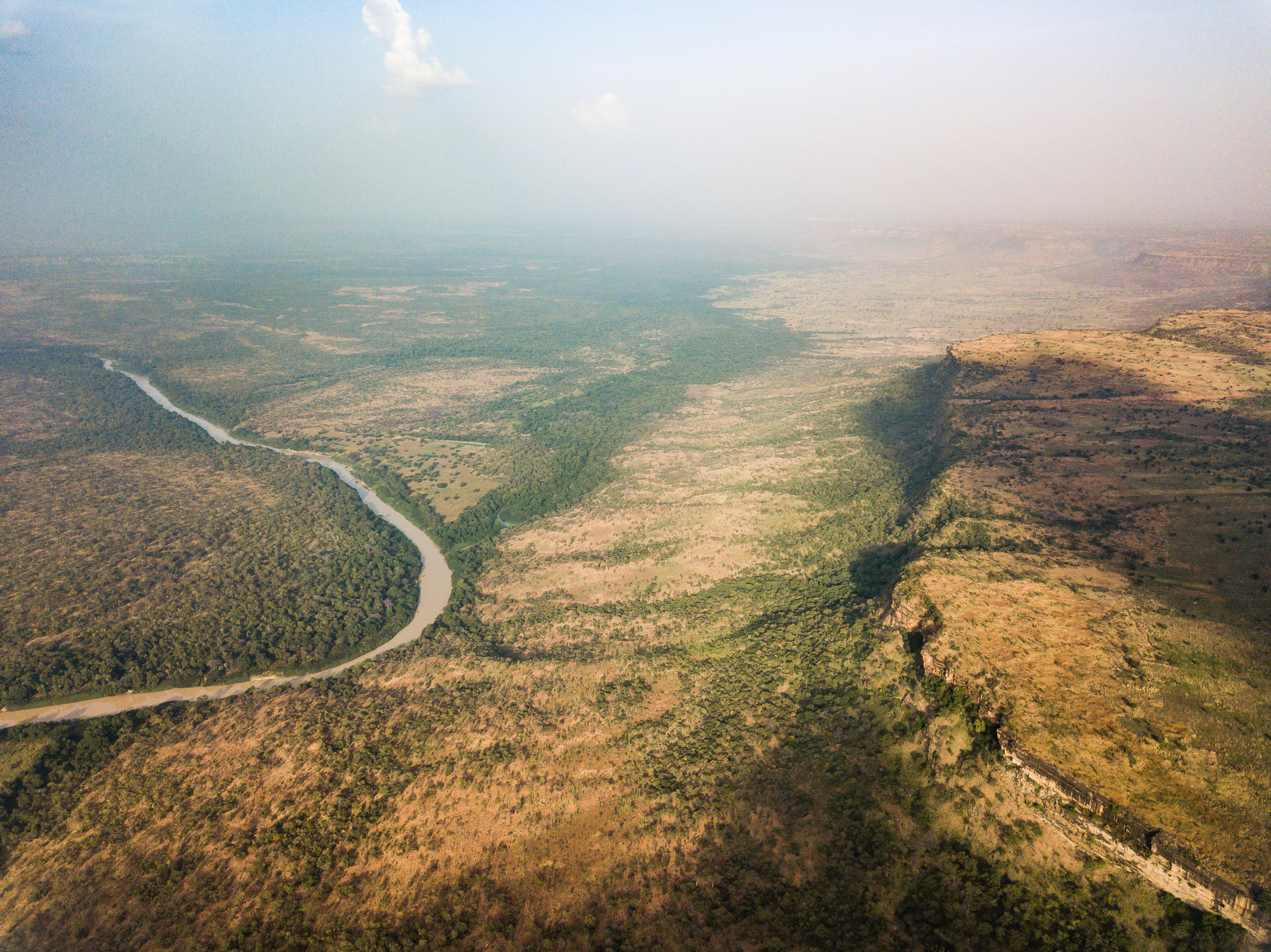
White Volta & Gambaga Scarp

- Gambaga Escarpment
- White Volta and Red Volta Rivers
- Ancient rock art at Gingana, Kpatiritinga, Jilik, and Tusugu
- NaYiri Palace in Nalerigu
- NaJeringa historic slave wall in Nalerigu
- Gravesites of ancient Mamprusi and Mossi kings in Gambaga
- Zayaa Mosque/Shrine in Wulugu
- Ancient Koma Figurines in Yikpabongo
- Buyuori Cave in Yikpabongo

== Economy ==
More than 85% of the economically active population are agricultural. The low population density is partly caused by emigration, in addition to geography and climate.

== Demographics ==
The North East Region has a low population density, and, along with the official language of English, most inhabitants speak a language of the Gur subfamily in the Niger–Congo language family, such as Mampruli, Tampulma, Bimoba, Kusaal, Dagbani, or Konkomba. The Mamprusi Kingdom is located in the region.

=== Religion ===
Most residents in the North East region are affiliated with Christianity, Islam, and/or Traditional African Religion.

== Administrative divisions ==
The political administration of the region is through the local government system. Under this administration system, the region is divided into six MMDA's (made up of 0 Metropolitan, 2 Municipal and 4 Ordinary Assemblies). Each District, Municipal or Metropolitan Assembly, is administered by a Chief Executive, representing the central government but deriving authority from an Assembly headed by a presiding member elected from among the members themselves. The current list is as follows:

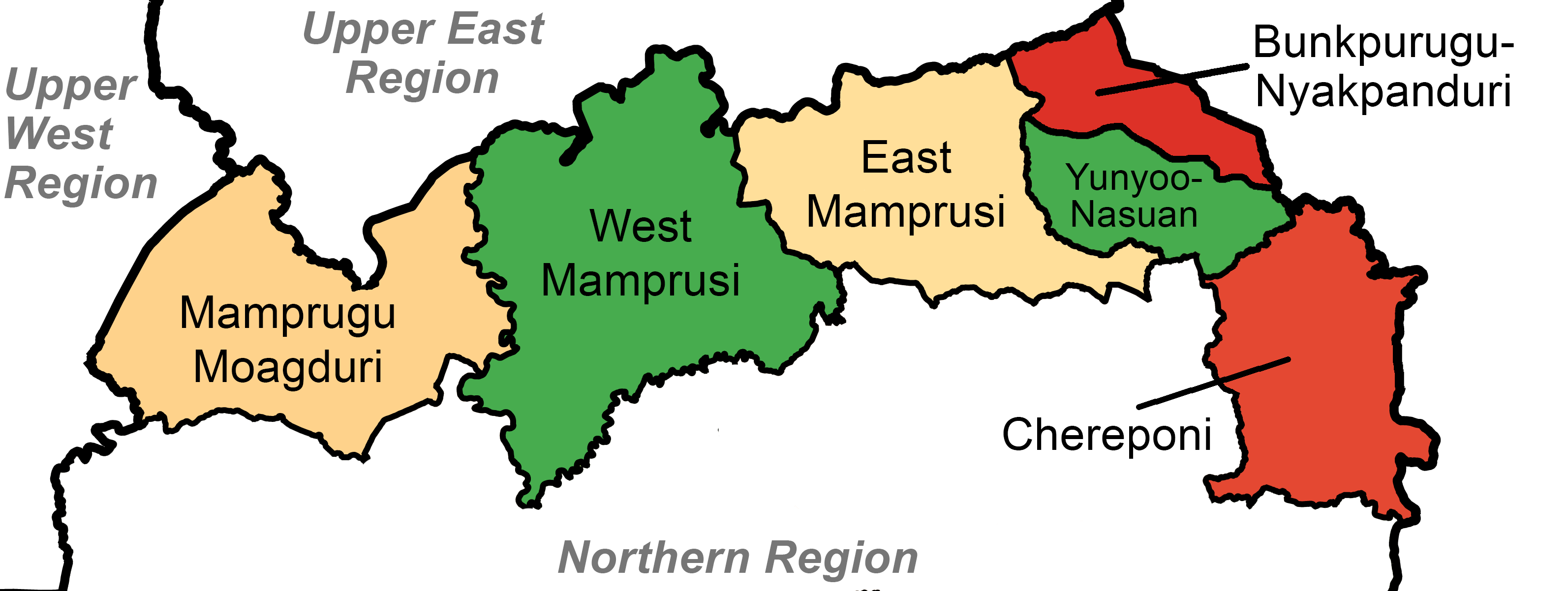
Districts of the North East Region

Districts of the North East Region
| # | MMDA Name | Capital | MMDA Type | Population |
|---|---|---|---|---|
| 1 | Bunkpurugu-Nyankpanduri | Bunkpurugu | Ordinary | |
| 2 | Chereponi | Chereponi | Ordinary | 55,932 |
| 3 | East Mamprusi | Nalerigu | Municipal | 121,009 |
| 4 | Mamprugu-Moagduri | Yagaba | Ordinary | |
| 5 | West Mamprusi | Walewale | Municipal | |
| 6 | Yunyoo-Nasuan | Yunyoo | Ordinary | |

== Famous citizens ==
Famous native citizens of North East region
| # | Citizen | Settlement |
|---|---|---|
| 1 | Mahamudu Bawumia | Nalerigu/Walewale |
| 2 | Solomon Namliit Boar (MP) | Bunkpurugu |
| 3 | Edward Mahama | Nalerigu |
| 4 | Alima Mahama (MP) | Nalerigu |
| 5 | Sagri Banbangi (MP) | Walewale |
