= Fiifi Kwetey =

Ghanaian politician

Hon. Fifi Fiavi Kwetey
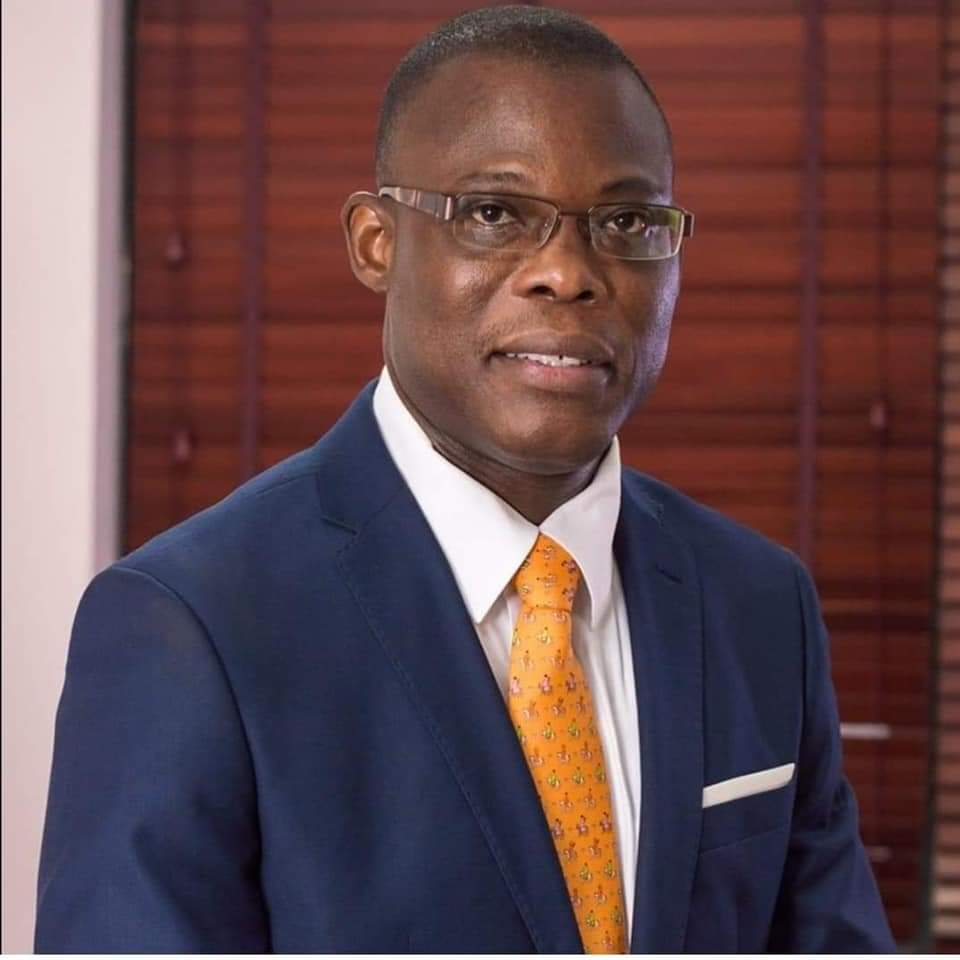

General Secretary for NDC
- Incumbent
- Assumed office 2022
- Preceded by: Johnson Asiedu-Nketia

Member of Parliament for Ketu South
- In office 7 January 2013 – 6 January 2021
- Preceded by: Albert Kwasi Zigah
- Succeeded by: Dzifa Gomashie

Minister for Transport
- In office February 2016 – January 2017
- President: John Mahama
- Preceded by: Dzifa Attivor
- Succeeded by: Kweku Asiamah

Minister of Food and Agriculture
- In office 2014–2015
- President: John Mahama
- Preceded by: Clement Kofi Humado
- Succeeded by: Limuna Mohammed Muniru

Minister of State at the Presidency in charge of Financial and Allied Institutions
- In office 2013–2014
- President: John Mahama

Deputy Minister of Finance
- In office 2009–2013
- President: John Atta-Mills
- Preceded by: George Gyan-Baffour
- Succeeded by: Cassiel Ato Forson

Personal details
- Born: Fiifi Fiavi Kwetey; 2 June 1967 (age 59) Nogokpo, Ghana
- Party: National Democratic Congress
- Children: 4

Fifi Fiavi Kwetey (born 2 June 1967) is a Ghanaian politician and general secretary of the National Democratic Congress. He is a former two-term member of Parliament for the Ketu South constituency in Ghana. He was propaganda secretary for the National Democratic Congress (NDC).

== Early life and education ==
Kwetey was born in Hohoe but comes from Nogokpo both in the Volta Region of Ghana. He attended Bishop Herman College in Kpando in 1987, where he acquired his O level certificate. He further moved to Achimota School for his A level certificate. He holds a Bachelor of Arts in Economics and Psychology from the University of Ghana. In 1994, he obtained the Diplômes de la Chambre de Commerce et d'industrie de Paris.

== Career ==
After university, Kwetey did his national service with the office of Parliament from October 1993 to July 1994.

After the mandatory one-year national service, he worked as a financial analyst and a stockbroker at the investment banking firm Strategic African Securities Ltd in July 1995. He subsequently moved to CDH Financial Holdings Ltd as a funds manager, investment analyst and stockbroker. He worked there from April 1998 to February 2002, whilst also serving as a tutor for some financial courses at the Ghana Stock Exchange.

== Politics ==
In university, Kwetey was as a student leader, serving as the chairman for the National Democratic Congress branch on the University of Ghana, Legon Campus. In December 2005, he contested in the NDC national executive elections and won to become the chief communicator for the NDC. Serving as the chief communicator, which his party dubbed as the party's propaganda secretary, he was seen as the person to criticize the other parties and raise pertinent issues regarding their parties, whilst defending his party on the necessary platforms. The position of propaganda secretary was subsequently rebranded into the National Communications Officer.

=== Deputy minister for finance ===
In 2009, Kwetey was appointed by John Atta Mills to serve as deputy minister for finance to Kwabena Duffuor, who was then minister for finance. Kwetey was sworn into office in April 2009 after going through vetting in parliament. He worked in that role until January 2013.

=== Member of Parliament ===
In 2012, Kwetey won the Ketu South National Democratic Congress primaries in the 2012 parliamentary elections. He won the primaries by receiving 403 votes, against 60 votes polled by the then incumbent Albert Ziga, who came third, Raphael Alorwu who polled 82 votes, and Nyphson Agbagedy who got 30 votes. Kwetey subsequently won the Ketu South parliamentary elections by getting 77,837 votes, which represented 88.92% of the votes cast against his closest contender, Godwin Yayra Nkuawu of the New Patriotic Party, who got 4,122 votes representing 4.71%.

In 2015, Kwetey was maintained as the National Democratic Congress candidate for the Ketu South constituency going into the 2016 parliamentary elections. He won the primaries by polling 146,10 votes representing 86.13%, to beat Sylvanus Amedorme, who received 1,375 votes, and Famous Kuadugah, who received 637 votes at Denu in the Volta Region.

Kwetey was elected in the 2016 elections to serve as member of parliament for Ketu South for another term in the parliament of Ghana after getting 48,723 votes, representing 65.47% of the total votes against his closest contender, Jim Yao Morti, an independent candidate who got 18,643 votes representing 25.04%. Morti was a former member of the NDC who had been disqualified during the vetting process, was subsequently suspended by the NDC, and was contesting as an independent candidate.

=== Minister of state ===
Kwetey was appointed by President John Dramani Mahama to serve as minister of state at the presidency in charge of financial and allied institutions in February 2013. His role was to work with the finance ministry through the office of the president to monitor and regulate the financial and allied institutions. In that capacity, he inaugurated a five-member steering committee for the National Pensions Regulatory Authority (NPRA) to oversee the implementation of a three-year capacity building agreement with the Swiss government.

=== Minister of food and agriculture ===
Kwetey was reassigned to serve as minister of food and agriculture to replace Clement Kofi Humado. His role was to increase in Ghanaian agricultural production and exporting, and reduce the importing of goods. His vision was to push the agricultural ministry into an agribusiness-oriented rather than just a food production-oriented sector.

Kwetey was later made minister for transport after Dzifa Ativor resigned after issues regarding the controversial GHS 3.6m bus re-branding contract.

== Personal life ==
Kwetey is married to Naomi Kwetey, and they have four children.

== Anti-Muslim comment ==
In his capacity as propaganda secretary of the NDC and adviser to former President Rawlings, Kwetey in 2007 stated during an interaction with US embassy officials that a Muslim could never become the president of the Republic of Ghana. He said, "While most Ghanaians would not admit this openly, a Muslim could not be elected president of Ghana". Brought to light following the mass leakage of US diplomatic cables in 2010, his comments provoked anger among Ghanaian Muslims, who demanded that he retract his statements and apologize to the Muslim community. As of March 2015, he had yet to do so.

== See also ==
- NDC politicians
