= Innocent Mahamadu Yahaya =

Ghanaian politician

Alhaji Innocent Mahamadu Yahaya

Member of parliament for Chereponi Constituency
- In office 7 January 1993 – 6 January 2001
- President: John Jerry Rawlings

Personal details
- Born: 17 April 1954 Chereponi, Northern Region Ghana)
- Died: 12 September 2000 (aged 46)
- Party: National Democratic Congress
- Education: Bulgarian Academy of Sciences in Sofia, Bulgaria, Gbewaah Training College
- Occupation: Politician
- Profession: Teacher

Innocent Mahamadu Yahaya (17 April 1954 – 12 September 2000) was a Ghanaian politician and a member of the Second Parliament of the Fourth Republic representing the Chereponi Constituency in Northern Ghana.

== Early life and education ==
Yahaya was born at Cheroponi in the Northern Region of Ghana. He attended Academy of Social Science and obtained a Diploma in Political Economy and the Gbewaah Training College and obtained a Teacher's Training Certificate.

== Politics ==
He was elected into the first parliament of the fourth republic of Ghana on 7 January 1993, after he was pronounced winner at the 1992 Ghanaian parliamentary election held on 29 December 1992.

Yahaya was then re-elected into the second parliament of the fourth republic of Ghana on the ticket of the National Democratic Congress after he emerged winner at the 1996 Ghanaian general elections for the Chereponi constituency in the Northern Region of Ghana. He polled 9,092 votes out of the 17,158 valid votes cast representing 39.60% over his opponents Jakpa Samson Mariba who polled 3,825 votes, Bawa Ali Manshi who polled 2,794 votes and Tabi Anthony Bondo Yaw who polled 1,510 votes. He was defeated in the 2000 Party's Primaries by Mohammed Seidu Abah.

== Career ==
Aside being a Politician, Yahaya was a Teacher.

== Personal life ==
Yahaya is a Muslim. He died on 12 September 2000.
