= Charles Kofi Agbenaza =

Ghanaian politician

Hon. Charles Kofi Agbenaza

Member of Parliament for Ketu South Constituency
- In office 7 January 1997 – 6 January 2001
- Preceded by: Wisdom Tsidore Seyena-Susu

Member of Parliament for Ketu South Constituency
- In office 7 January 2001 – 6 January 2005
- President: John Kufuor
- Succeeded by: Albert Kwasi Zigah

Personal details
- Born: 1931
- Died: 2 November 2012 (aged 80–81)
- Party: National Democratic Congress

Charles Kofi Agbenaza (1931-2 November 2012) was a Ghanaian politician and a member of the 2nd and 3rd parliament of the 4th republic of Ghana. He is a former member of Parliament for the Ketu South constituency as well as a former deputy regional minister of the Volta Region of Ghana.

He died on 12 November 2012 after a short illness and was laid to rest on 9 February 2013.

== Politics ==
Agbenaza was a member of the 2nd and 3rd parliament of the 4th republic of Ghana. He was a member of the National Democratic Congress and a representative of the Ketu South constituency of the Volta Region of Ghana.

His political career began when he contested in the 1996 Ghanaian general election and won with a total of 53,276 votes making 68.90% of the total votes cast that year.

=== 1996 Elections ===
Agbenaza contested in the 1996 Ghanaian General Elections with the ticket of the National Democratic Congress and won the contest. Other runner ups were Peter Kwesi Desky Ahedor of the Conventions Peoples Party who had 3,609 votes, Thomas Kwashikpmi Seshie of the New Patriotic Party who had 2,150 votes and Christian Yao Zigah of the Peoples National Convention who had 1,035 of the total votes. Agbenaza had 53,276 votes which is 68.90% of the total votes.

=== 2000 Elections ===
Agbenaza was elected as the member of parliament for the Ketu South constituency in the 2000 Ghanaian general elections. He won the elections on the ticket of the National Democratic Congress.

His constituency was a part of the 17 parliamentary seats out of 19 seats won by the National Democratic Congress in that election for the Volta Region. The National Democratic Congress won a minority total of 92 parliamentary seats out of 200 seats in the 3rd parliament of the 4th republic of Ghana.

He was elected with 39,169 votes out of 46,440 total valid votes cast. This was equivalent to 86.1% of the total valid votes cast. He was elected over Thomas K.RF. Seshie of the New Patriotic Party, Christian Yao Zigah of the Convention People's Party, Selorm A. O Henyo and Godwin Tay of the United Ghana Movement.

These obtained 3,486, 1,810, 780 and 248 votes respectively out of the total valid votes cast. These were equivalent to 7.7%, 4%, 1.7% and 0.5% respectively of total valid votes cast.
