= Likpalimor Kwajo Tawiah =

Ghanaian politician (1960–2023)

Hon. Likpalimor Kwadwo Tawiah

Member of Ghana Parliament for Kpandai constituency
- In office 7 January 1993 – 6 January 2013
- Succeeded by: Matthew Nyindam

Personal details
- Born: 9 September 1960 Nanjuro, Saboba, Northern Region, Ghana
- Died: 19 September 2023 (aged 63) Tamale, Ghana
- Party: National Democratic Congress
- Education: University of Education, Winneba; Ghana Institute of Management and Public Administration
- Occupation: Politician
- Profession: Teacher

Likpalimor Kwajo Tawiah (9 September 1960 – 19 September 2023) was a Ghanaian politician and a member of the First, Second, Third, Fourth and Fifth Parliament of the Fourth Republic of Ghana representing the Kpandai constituency in the Northern Region of Ghana.

== Early life and education ==
Tawiah was born on 9 September 1960 in Nanjuro-Kpandai in the Northern Region of Ghana. He attended the University of Education, Winneba and studied to obtain a Bachelor of Education degree in English in 2002. He also attended the Ghana Institute of Management and Public Administration in 2008. He also had a Teachers' Training Certificate in English at Advance Teacher Training College.

== Career ==
Prior to becoming a member of parliament, Tawiah worked with the Ghana Education Service as a Tutor at T.I Ahmadiyya Secondary School in Salaga. He was the member of parliament for the Kpandai Constituency in the Northern Region of Ghana from 1993 to 2013. Likpalimor is a former minister of state at the presidency and who had been Principal Superintendent of the Ghana Education Service.

== Politics ==
Tawiah was first elected into parliament during the 1992 Ghanaian general election on the ticket of the National Democratic Congress (NDC). During the 1996 election, he polled 18,698 votes out of the 32,508 valid votes cast representing 50.30%. He defeated Konde Paul Evans Dawuni an Independent who obtained 9,729 votes representing 26.20% of the share and Kpajal Kwasi James of the New Patriotic Party (NPP) who obtained 4,081 votes representing 11.00% of the share. He contested again in 2000 and polled 13,368 votes out of the 24,674 valid votes cast representing 54.20%.

Tawiah retained his seat again from 2004 to 2012 obtaining 17,233 votes representing 59.61%, and 15,126 votes representing 55.15% respectively. However, he was defeated by Matthew Nyindam in the 2012 Ghanaian general elections who won with 16,221 votes (42.48%) against Tawiah with 13,794 votes (36.12%); Alfred Donkor Odzidzator, an independent with 7,795 votes (20.41%), Bumarck Braimah Friko of the Convention People's Party with 156 votes (0.41%), Mboko Mkrajimamo Yaw of the Progressive People's Party with 154 votes (0.40%), and Aniwaba Kwaku Bediako Jeremiah of the National Democratic Party with 68 votes (0.18%).

In 2011, Tawiah was criticised as incompetent, with his administration being said to have failed to improve the living situation of the people in his constituency. "Kpandai Constituency has one of the lowest and worst education standards, very high poverty level, high youth unemployment, worst deplorable roads, lack of health facilities and lack of good drinking water in the country. It's pretty obvious; the MP has nothing new to offer to his constituents. He has no plans for constituency and neither has he influenced successive governments since 1992 to bring developmental projects to the constituency" wrote Kwadwo Num, a constituent.

In 2014, Tawiah urged E&P firms to be mindful of the environmental impact of oil and gas on plant and animal lives as well as potential conflicts at the Ghana Hosts Peace and Environment Conference. The conference was held by Center for Peace and Environmental Justice (CEPEJ). He said: "I believe you can all join me to confirm the fact that environmental issues have been regarded by many as matters of low politics. As a result, environmental conservation and sustainability have not received much attention across the world."

== Personal life and death ==
Tawiah was married with five children. He was a Christian and a member of the Catholic Church. Tawiah died on 19 September 2023, at the age of 63.
