= Joseph Bukari =

Ghanaian politician

The Honourable Bukari Nikpe Joseph MP
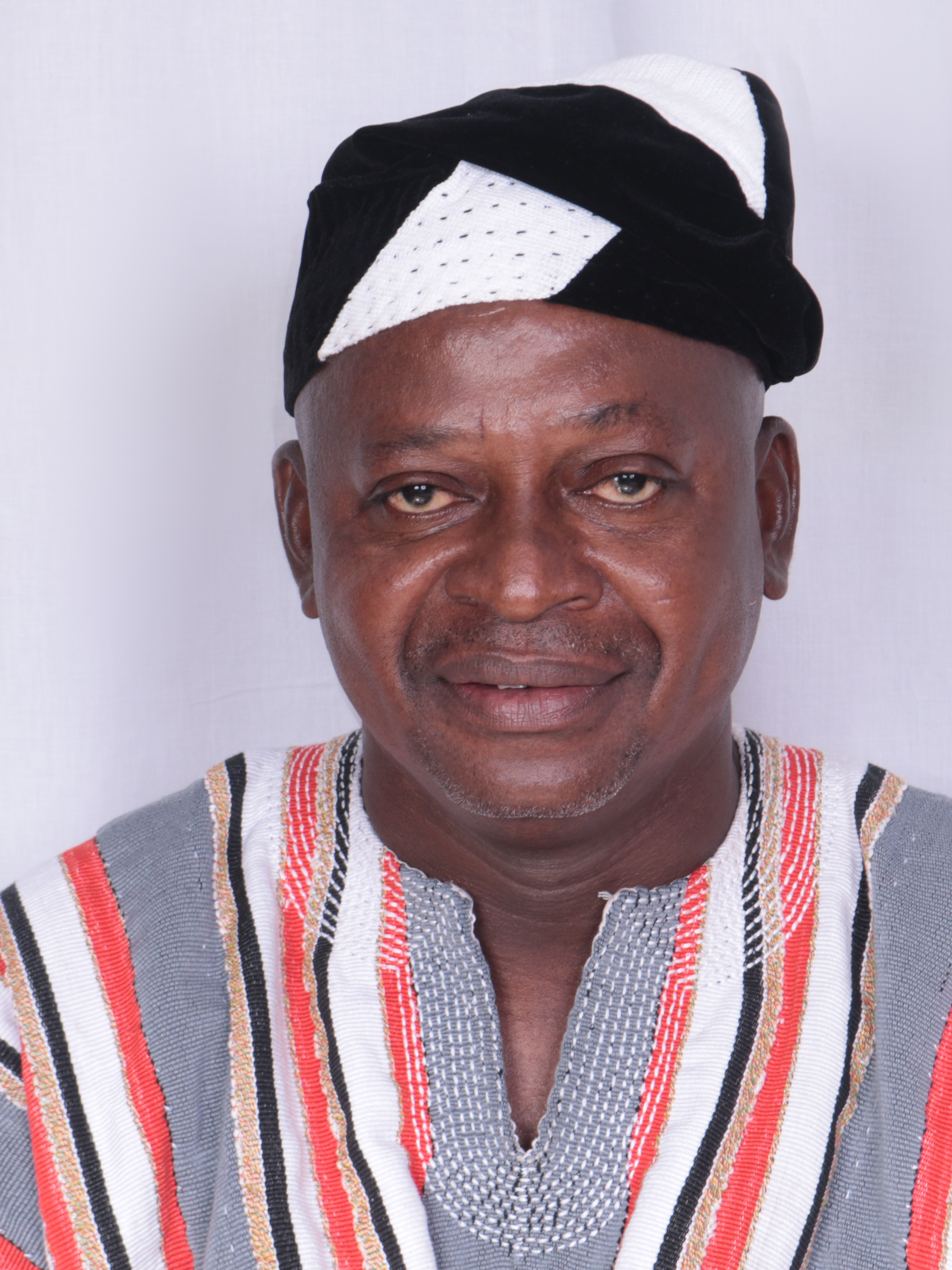

Minister for Transport
- Incumbent
- Assumed office February 2025
- President: John Mahama
- Preceded by: Kwaku Ofori Asiamah

Member of the Ghana Parliament for Saboba
- Incumbent
- Assumed office 7 January 2021
- Preceded by: Charles Binipom Bintin
- In office 7 January 2009 – 6 January 2017
- Succeeded by: Charles Binipom Bintin

Personal details
- Born: 3 October 1969 (age 56) Saboba, Northern Region, Ghana
- Party: National Democratic Congress
- Children: 2
- Education: University of Education, Winneba
- Occupation: Politician
- Profession: Educationist

Joseph Nikpe Bukari (born October 3, 1969) is a Ghanaian politician and was a member of the Sixth Parliament of the Fourth Republic of Ghana as well as the Seventh Parliament of the Fourth Republic of Ghana representing the Saboba Constituency in the Northern Region of Ghana. He is currently the Minister in charge of the Ministry of Transport (Ghana)

== Personal life ==
Joseph is a Christian and a member of the Evangelical Presbyterian. He is married with two children.

== Early life and education ==
Joseph was born on October 3, 1969. He hails from Saboba, a town in the Northern Region of Ghana. In 2006, he gained admission into the University of Education, Winneba and obtained his Bachelor of Education degree in Technology.

== Politics ==
Joseph was first elected into parliament on the ticket of the National Democratic Congress during the December 2008 Ghanaian general election as a Member of Parliament for the Saboba constituency in the Northern Region of Ghana. During the election, he polled 10,331 votes out of the 20,839 valid votes cast representing 49.58%. He contested again in 2012 Ghanaian general election and polled 13,409 votes out of the 26,058 valid votes cast representing 51.09%. He was defeated in the 2016 Ghanaian general election by Charles Binipom Bintin who represented the New Patriotic Party.

== Employment ==
Bukari is an educationist. Prior to becoming a Member of Parliament, he worked as the District Training Officer with the Ghana Education Service in Saboba. He joined the Employment, Social Warfare and State House Committee. He was a member of Parliament from 2009 to 2013.
