= Nogokpo =

- village
- Location of Nogokpo in Ghana
- Coordinates: 6°5′31.43″N 1°4′19.09″E
- Country: Ghana
- Region: Volta Region
- District: Ketu South Municipal
- Time zone: GMT
  - Summer (DST): GMT

Nogokpo is a small village located in the Ketu South Municipal of the Volta Region of Ghana along the Trans–West African Coastal Highway.

== History ==
Nogokpo was founded by Torgbui Saba Tritriku Agbo. He migrated from Agbozume Sukladzi and was one of the brave war captains of Somey State. Saba’s ancestors originated from Ningo and were displaced by the Akwamu wars. In order to strengthen himself spiritually for war, he embarked on spiritual journey to Dahomey and came back with Zakadza, the Yewe god of thunder similar to Shango cult of the Yoruba or Thor of the ancient Scandinavians. A misunderstanding with the town folks of Agbozume compelled Saba to move to Nogokpo which was then his farmstead. The first priestess of the deity was Saba’s younger sister Minawo Ladzeshie as Saba himself was a mercenary and was always away from home participating in intertribal wars.

== Etymology ==
Nogokpo: Ewe language — E: nor : ge : kpo: a ? Will you live here peacefully or crime free? That was the question he (Saba) asked anyone who asked to live near him in his new location. This is a warning in reference to his god not tolerating violence.

There is an alternative narration:

Ewe language: Ma bla nye nua nogoe kpoo.

Let me tie (bundle) my stuff without trouble.

This narration is in reference to his exodus from Agbozume with his god.

The original name of Nogokpo was Dalakpanaku: You lie, you die.

Zakadza: Fon language (part of Gbe languages cluster )- Night crocodile

It is noted for its traditional and spiritual shrine.

== Controversies ==
In May 2023, Archbishop Charles Agyinasare, the founder of the Perez Chapel International in one of his sermons, said Nogokpo is the headquarters of demons in the Volta Region of Ghana.

On June 2, 2023 the traditional leaders of Nogokpo gave Archbishop Charles Aginasare a 14-day ultimatum to appear before them for questioning. They said failure to honor the ultimatum, they will be left with no other option but to refer their concerns to the gods to handle.
