= Chereponi (Ghana parliament constituency) =

Constituency in Ghana

- constituency for the Parliament of Ghana
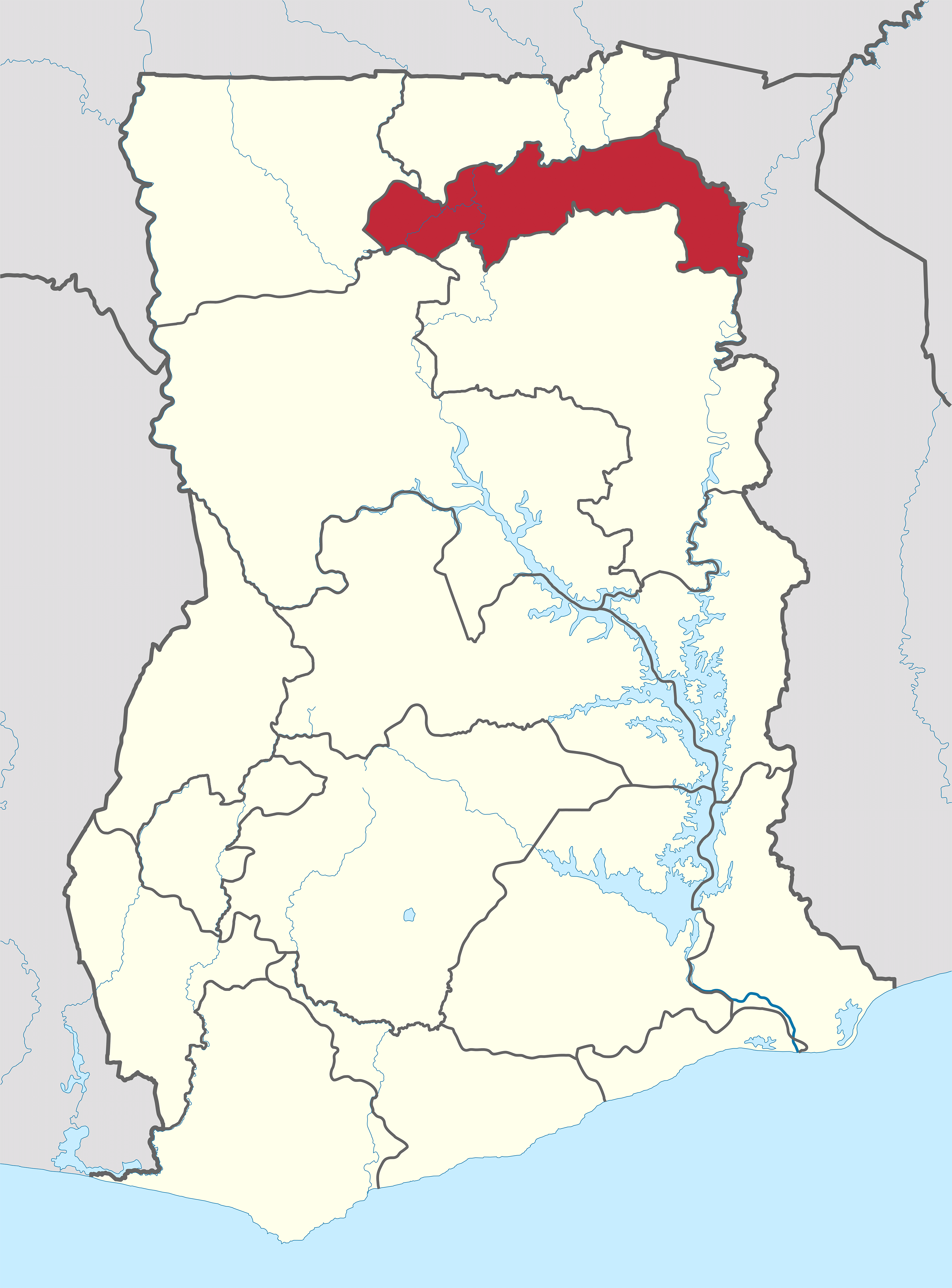
- District: Saboba/Chereponi District
- Region: North East Region of Ghana

Current constituency
- Party: National Democratic Congress
- MP: Seidu Alhassan Alajor

Chereponi is one of the constituencies represented in the Parliament of Ghana. It elects one Member of Parliament (MP) by the first past the post system of election. Seidu Alhassan Alajor is the member of parliament for the constituency. Chereponi is located in the Chereponi district of the North East Region of Ghana.

== Boundaries ==
The seat is located within the Saboba/Chereponi district of the North East Region of Ghana.

== Members of Parliament ==
Election	Member	Party
1992	Innocent Mahamadu Yahaya	National Democratic Congress
2000	Mohammed Seidu Abah	National Democratic Congress
2004	Doris Asibi Seidu	New Patriotic Party
2009	Samuel Abdulai Jabanyite	National Democratic Congress

== Elections ==
Doris Asibi Asiedu died on 31 July 2009 after an illness. The Electoral Commission of Ghana organised a by-election for 29 September 2009. Samuel Abdulai Jabanyite (NDC) was declared the winner and duly elected MP by the Electoral Commission of Ghana

2009 by-election: Chereponi Source:Ghana Home Page
Party	Candidate	Votes	%	±%
National Democratic Congress	Samuel Abdulai Jabanyite	8,239	50.9	7.3
New Patriotic Party	Abukari Aminu Gariba	7,416	45.8	−6.5
People's National Convention	Rebecca Namana Jabari	176	1.0	−0.6
New Vision Party	Issah Yaw	139	0.8	—
Democratic People's Party	Iliasu Fati	106	0.6	—
Majority		823	5.1	−3.6
Turnout		16,186	71.3	—

MPs elected in the Ghana parliamentary election, 2008: Chereponi Source:Ghana Home Page
Party	Candidate	Votes	%	±%
New Patriotic Party	Doris Asibi Seidu	9,188	52.3	15.9
National Democratic Congress	Seidu Issah Abah	7,648	43.6	9.1
Convention People's Party	Michael Kwabena Yawkan	437	2.5	−1.0
People's National Convention	Jabali Namana	286	1.6	—
Majority		1,540	8.7	−6.8
Turnout				

2004 Ghanaian parliamentary election: Chereponi Source:Electoral Commission of Ghana
Party	Candidate	Votes	%	±%
New Patriotic Party	Doris Asibi Seidu	5,873	36.4	33.2
National Democratic Congress	Seidu Issah Abah	5,561	34.5	−10.1
Independent	Bawa Mamshie Ali	4,138	25.7	—
Convention People's Party	Kwabena Yawkan Michael	559	3.5	−3.4
Majority		312	1.9	−15.1
Turnout		17,378	90.3	—

2000 Ghanaian parliamentary election: Chereponi Source:Adam Carr's Election Archive
Party	Candidate	Votes	%	±%
National Democratic Congress	Mohammed Seidu Abah	6,270	44.6	−8.2
People's National Convention	Bawah Mamshie Ali	3,879	27.6	11.4
National Reform Party	Jabanyit A Samuel	2,504	17.8	—
Convention People's Party	Joseph K Lanzari	965	6.9	—
New Patriotic Party	Abubakar S Malba	453	3.2	−5.6
Majority		2,391	17.0	−13.6
Turnout				—

1996 Ghanaian parliamentary election: Chereponi Source:Electoral Commission of Ghana
Party	Candidate	Votes	%	±%
National Democratic Congress	Innocent Mahamadu Yahaya	9,092	52.8	—
People's Convention Party	Jakpa Samson Mariba	3,825	22.2	—
People's National Convention	Bawa Ali Mamshi	2,794	16.2	—
New Patriotic Party	Tabi Anthony Bondo Yaw	1,510	8.8	—
Majority		5,267	30.6	—
Turnout		17,221	74.9	—

1992 Ghanaian parliamentary election: Chereponi Source:Electoral Commission of Ghana
Party	Candidate	Votes	%	±%
National Democratic Congress	Innocent Mahamadu Yahaya			—
Majority				—
Turnout				—

== See also ==
- List of Ghana Parliament constituencies
