= Saboba District =

- District
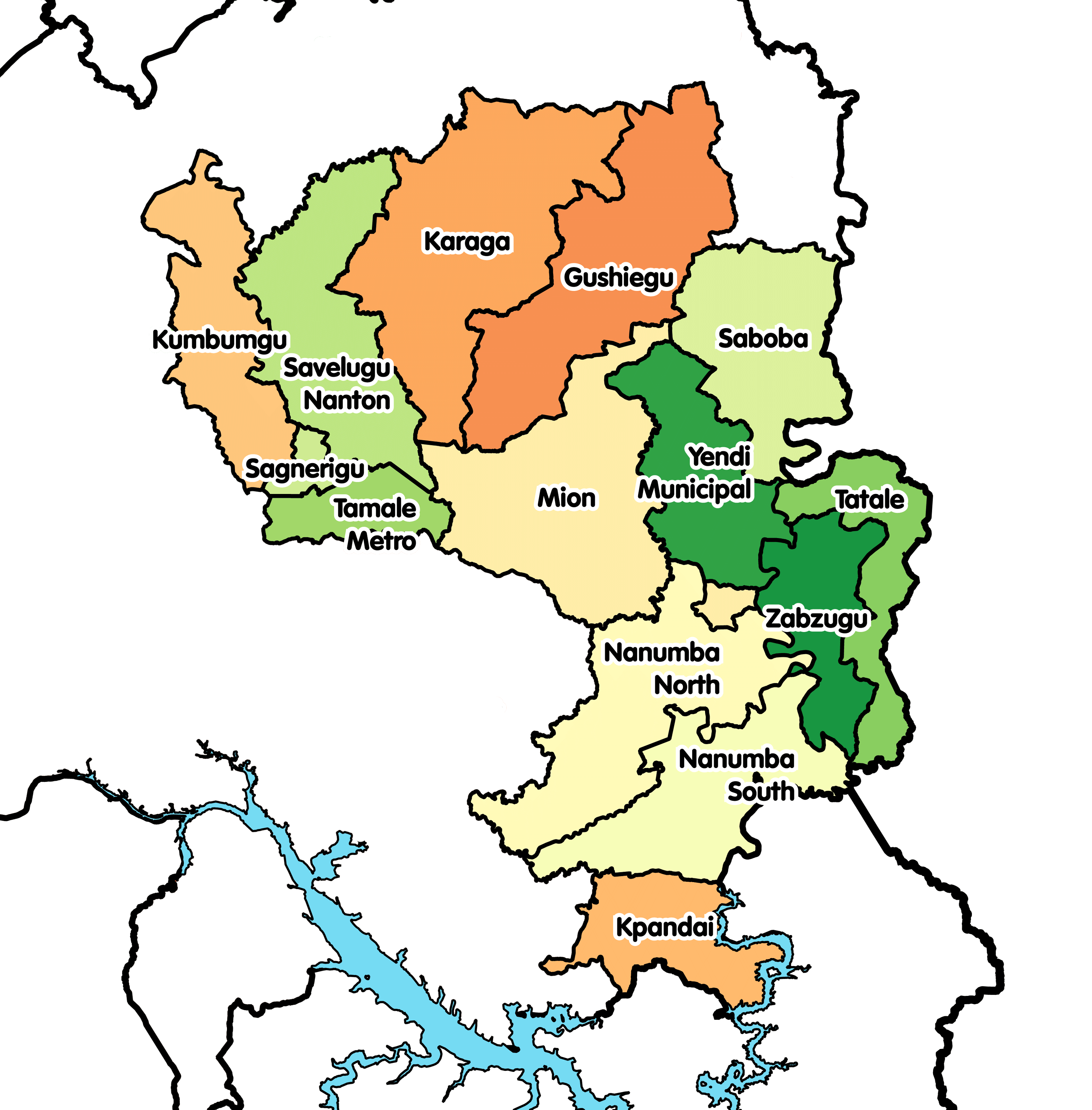
- Districts of Northern Region

- Location of Saboba District within Northern
- Coordinates: 9°42′23.76″N 0°18′59.4″E
- Country: Ghana
- Region: Northern
- Capital: Saboba

Population (2021)
  - Total: 95,683
- Time zone: UTC+0 (GMT)
- ISO 3166 code: GH-NE-YN

Saboba District is one of the sixteen districts in Northern Region, Ghana Originally it was formerly part of the then-larger Saboba-Chereponi District in 1988, which was created from the former East Dagomba District Council, until the northern part of the district was split off to create Chereponi District on 29 February 2008 (which is currently part of North East Region); thus the remaining part has been renamed as Saboba District. The district assembly is located in the northeast part of Northern Region and has Saboba as its capital town.

== Religion ==
Christianity is the dominant religion in the district, with over 68.0 per cent of the population claiming Christianity as their faith. The next populous religion is Islam, 16.0 per cent and traditional religion 9.0 per cent. The rest of the population has no affiliation with any organized religion.
