= Charles Binipom Bintin =

Ghanaian politician (born 1964)

Member of the Ghana Parliament for Saboba Constituency

Personal details
- Born: 22 August 1964 (age 62)
- Party: New Patriotic Party

Charles Binipom Bintin is a Ghanaian politician who was a member of the Seventh Parliament of the Fourth Republic of Ghana, representing the Saboba Constituency in the Northern Region on the ticket of the New Patriotic Party.

== Early life and education ==
Charles Binipom Bintin was born in Kuntuli-Saboba in the Northern Region of Ghana on 22 August 1964. He went to University of Ghana and obtained a Diploma in Adult Education in 1999 and later proceeded to the University of Cape Coast for his post graduate studies in Arts in the year 2007.

== Politics ==
Charles Binipom Bintin entered parliament on 7 January 2005 on the ticket of the New Patriotic Party and he was elected as the member of parliament for the Saboba Constituency in the 2004 Ghanaian general election in December. He was elected as the member of parliament for the Saboba Constituency in the fourth parliament of the fourth republic of Ghana under His excellency the Ex-President J.A Kufour's administration. He obtain a total vote cast of 10,441 which represent 53.60% whiles his opponent candidates, Bilijo Nayon of the National Democratic Congress polled 7,892 representing 40.50% of the vote and Kenneth Wujangi of the People's National Convention obtained 1,157 also representing 5.90% of the total vote cast. Charles Binipom Bintin emerged as the winner of the Saboba Constituency.

== Career ==
Charles Binipom Bintim worked with Ghana Education Service as a Tutor in Evangelical Presbyterian Secondary School in the year 1999 to 2001. He was the District Chief Executive for Saboba-Chereponi District in the 2001 to 2003. He was the Deputy Minister for Northern Region in the year 2003 to 2005 and the Member of Parliament for Saboba Constituency in the year 2005 to 2009. He was also the Minister for Local Government in the year 2005 to 2009.

== Personal life ==
Charles Binipom Bintim is married with three children and identifies as a Christian.
