= Tamale College of Education =

College in Northern Region, Ghana

- Affiliations: Government of Ghana
- Location: Tamale, Sagnarigu District, NS046, Ghana; 9.42136°N 0.85926°W
- Language: English
- Region Zone: Northern Region; Northern Zone
- Short name: TaCo / Tace
- Source: An Atlas of The Forty Colleges of Education in Ghana.

Tamale College of Education is a teacher education college in Tamale (Sagnarigu District, Northern Region, Ghana). The college is located in Northern Zone zone. It is one of the 46 public colleges of education in Ghana. The college participated in the DFID-funded T-TEL programme. For the 2018/2019 academic year, the institution received 1086 admission applications but admitted 543. The rest were rejected due to infrastructural challenges.

== History ==
Tamale College of Education is located within the Education Ridge in the Tamale, Ghana Metropolis. It was opened in 1958 with the motto ‘ORA ET LABORA’ by the first president of the Republic of Ghana, Osagyefo Dr. Kwame Nkrumah. Sixty female pioneer students were enrolled in the college that year, and it remained a female institution until 1977 when it became a mixed institution.

The first principal of the college was Miss Freda Mischler, a Swiss Missionary.

Tamale College of Education has staff and students’ accommodation. It has academic facilities such as Science Laboratory, Library, Assembly Hall, ICT centre with internet facilities. The college has a 4WD Nissan Patrol, a Benz Bus and a 58-seater Tata bus.

The principals who have administered the college are:
Name	Years served
Miss Frieda Mischler	Dec. 1957 – May 1966
Miss Victoria Sackey	May 1966 – Feb. 1971
Mr. Jacob Wayo Amankwa	Feb. 1971 – Mar. 1972
Miss Roseline Shiata Mumuni	Mar. 1972 – Aug.1973
Miss Fusein Katumi	Aug. 1973 – Oct. 1974
Mrs Elizabeth Addabor	Oct. 1974 – Feb.1987
Alhaji B.A. Fuseini	Feb. 1987 – Mar. 1988
Mrs Margaret Andan	Mar. 1988 – Mar. 1997
Mr. Salifu Sulemana	Mar. 1997 – Jul. 2003
Alhaji Yakubu Bukari	Jul 2003 - 2015
Alhaji Sulemana Iddrisu	2015 - Date

== Programme ==
The college has gone through the following programmes since its establishment:

- 4-year Teacher's Certificate ‘A’ Post Middle 1957-1994
- 3-year Teacher's Certificate ‘A’ Post Middle 1990-2006
- 3-year Diploma in Basic Education post secondary 2004-
- 4-year Diploma in Basic Education – UTDBE 2005
- 2-year Diploma in Basic Education post ‘A’ sandwich 2007

== Notable alumni ==
Tamale College of Education has produced over 5,000 teachers for the Ghana Education Service since its establishment. Some of the products are

- Mrs. Margaret Andan who became a principal of the college and a Divisional Director for Secondary Education
- Miss Alice Continua a former District Chief Executive of Lambussie Karni District, and currently the Member of Parliament.
- Doris Asibi Seidu, former member of parliament for the Chereponi constituency.
- Ibrahim Murtala Muhammed, former deputy minister for Trade and Industry.
- Alhassan Suhuyini, current member of Parliament for Tamale north.
