= Wisdom Isidore Seyena-Susu =

Ghanaian politician and architect

Hon. Wisdom Isidore Seyena-Susu

Member of Parliament for Ketu South constituency
- In office 7 January 1993 – 7 January 1997
- President: Jerry John Rawlings
- Succeeded by: Charles Kofi Agbenaza

Personal details
- Born: 21 September 1938
- Died: before 1998
- Party: National Democratic Congress
- Education: Kwame Nkrumah University of Science and Technology
- Occupation: Politician
- Profession: Architect

Wisdom Isidore Seyena-Susu (21 September 1938 – before 1998) was a Ghanaian politician and architect. He served as a member of parliament for Ketu South constituency in the Volta Region of Ghana.

== Early life and education ==
Seyena-Susu was born on 21 September 1938. He attended Kwame Nkrumah University of Science and Technology and obtained a Bachelor of Science in architecture.

== Career ==
Seyena-Susu was a member of the first parliament of the fourth republic of Ghana from January 1993 to January 1997. He also worked as an architect.

== Politics ==
Wisdom Tsidore Seyena-Susu was first elected during the 1992 Ghanaian parliamentary election on the ticket of the National Democratic Congress as first parliament of the fourth republic of Ghana. He lost the seat in 1996 Ghanaian general election to Charles Kofi Agbenaza of the National Democratic Congress who won with 53,276 votes which represented 68.90% of the share. He defeated Peter Kwesi Desky Ahedor of Convention People's Party (CPP) who obtained 3,609 votes which represented 4.70% of the share; Thomas Kwashikpmi Seshie of the New Patriotic Party (NPP) who obtained 2,150 votes which represented 2.80% of the share and Christian Yao Zigah of People's National Convention (PNC) who obtained 1,035 votes which represented 1.30% of the share.

== Personal life and death ==
Seyena-Susu was a Christian. He died whilst still in office during the 1990s.
