= Minister for Transport (Ghana) =

Ministerial portfolio

The Minister for Transport in Ghana is the political head of the Ministry of Transport of Ghana. The scope of the responsibilities of this position has varied over the years. Since 2009, the Ministries of Aviation, Harbours and Railways and the Road Transport Services have been covered by one single agency, the Ministry of Transport. In previous years, the position had often been known as the Minister for Transport and Communications. In 2014, the Communications section of the Ministry was merged with the Ministry of Information to form a new Ministry of Communications with its own substantive minister, the Minister for Communications.

== List of ministers ==
Number	Minister	Took office	Left office	Government	Party
1	Krobo Edusei (Minister for Transport and Communications)			Nkrumah government	Convention People's Party
2	A. J. Dowuona-Hammond (MP) (Minister for Transport and Communications)	1964	Feb 1966	Nkrumah government	Convention People's Party
3	Patrick Dankwa Anin (Minister for Communications)	1966	1968	National Liberation Council	Military government
4	Matthew Poku (Minister for Communications)	1966	1968	National Liberation Council	Military government
5	Harona Esseku (MP) (Minister for Transport and Communications)	1969	1971	Busia government	Progress Party
6	Jatoe Kaleo (MP) (Minister for Transport and Communications)	1971	Jan 1972	Busia government	Progress Party
7	Lt. Colonel Anthony Selormey (Commissioner for Transport and Communications)	1972	1973	National Redemption Council	Military government
8	Kwame Asante (Commissioner for Transport and Communications)	1973	1974	National Redemption Council	Military government
9	Colonel Peter Kwame Agyekum (Commissioner for Transport and Communications)	1974	Oct 1975	National Redemption Council	Military government
10	Colonel David A. Iddisah (Commissioner for Transport and Communications)	Oct 1975		Supreme Military Council	Military government
11	Group Captain T. T. Kutin (Commissioner for Transport and Communications)			Supreme Military Council	Military government
12	Eric R.K. Dwemoh (Commissioner for Transport and Communications)			Supreme Military Council	Military government
13	George Harlley (Commissioner for Transport and Communications)	1978	Jun 1979	Supreme Military Council	Military government
13	George Harlley (Commissioner for Transport and Communications)	Jun 1979	Sep 1979	Armed Forces Revolutionary Council	Military government
14	Harry Sawyerr (Minister for Transport and Communications)	1979	Dec 1981	Limann government	People's National Party
15	Mahama Iddrisu (Secretary for Transport and Communications)	1983	1986	Provisional National Defence Council	Military government
16	Kwame M. Peprah (Secretary for Transport and Communications)	1986	1987	Provisional National Defence Council	Military government
17	Yaw Donkor (Secretary for Transport and Communications)	1987	1992	Provisional National Defence Council	Military government
18	Kwame M. Peprah (Secretary for Transport and Communications)	1992	Jan 1993	Provisional National Defence Council	Military government
19	Edward Salia (Minister for Transport and Communications) (Minister for Roads and Transport)	1993	1997	Rawlings government	National Democratic Congress
19	Edward Salia (Minister for Transport and Communications) (Minister for Roads and Transport)	1997	Jan 2001	Rawlings government	National Democratic Congress
20	Felix Owusu-Adjapong (Minister for Transport and Communications)	2001	2003	Kufuor government	New Patriotic Party
21	Richard Anane (Minister for Roads, Highways and Transport)	Apr 2003	Oct 2006	Kufuor government	New Patriotic Party
22	Vacant	Oct 2006	2007	Kufuor government	New Patriotic Party
23	Godfred T. Bonyon (Minister for Roads and Highways)	Aug 2007	Jan 2009	Kufuor government	New Patriotic Party
24	Mike Hammah (MP)	2009	2011	Mills government	National Democratic Congress (Ghana)
25	Collins Dauda (MP)	Jan 2011	Jul 2012	Mills government	National Democratic Congress (Ghana)
25	Collins Dauda (MP)	Jul 2012	Jan 2013	Mahama government	National Democratic Congress (Ghana)
26	Dzifa Attivor	Feb 2013	Dec 2015	Mahama government	National Democratic Congress (Ghana)
27	Fiifi Kwetey	Feb 2016	Jan 2017	Mahama government	National Democratic Congress (Ghana)
28	Kwaku Ofori Asiamah	Feb 2017	Jan 2025	Akufo-Addo government	New Patriotic Party
29	Joseph Nike Bukari	Feb 2025	Incumbent	Mahama government from 2025	National Democratic Congress (Ghana)
