= Dzifa Abla Gomashie =

Ghanaian politician (born 1965)

- Born: 1 January 1965 (age 61)
- Citizenship: Ghana
- Occupations: Politician, Actor, Screenwriter, Film producer

Dzifa Abla Gomashie is a Ghanaian politician and member of the National Democratic Congress (NDC). She represents Ketu South constituency in the 8th parliament of the 4th Republic in Ghana.

== Early life and education ==
Dzifa Abla Gomashie was born on Sunday, 25th July, 1965 and her hometown is called Aflao in the Volta Region. She went to the University of Ghana for her diploma in 1998, again continued with her BFA in the same school (University of Ghana) in 2003. She again continued by offering her MPhil in the University of Ghana in the year 2008.
