= Perez Chapel International =

Ghanaian Pentecostal Charismatic Christian church

- Theology: Pentecostal Charismatic
- Headquarters: Dzorwulu, Accra, Ghana
- Founder: Bishop Charles Agyinasare
- Official website: https://www.perezchapel.org

Perez Chapel International is an evangelical, Pentecostal Charismatic Christian church. It was founded by bishop Charles Agyinasare and is headquartered in Accra, Ghana in Dzorwulu.

== History ==
Perez Chapel International was founded under the name of Word Miracle Church International by Charles Agyin-Asare in 1987 in Tamale. In 1994, the headquarters were transferred to Accra and a new church was established with 70 people. In 2011, it inaugurated the Perez Dome, a 14,000-seat temple In 2013, the Perez Dome had 7,000 members and the denomination had 50,000 members in Accra. It took the name of Perez Chapel International in 2013. In 2017, it claimed to have 400 churches in 16 countries.

== Media Assets ==
The Church owns and operates Precious TV a private Christian television station.

== Education ==
The Church runs the Perez University College is a co-ed Christian University located in Gomoa Pomadze in the Central region of Ghana. It was formerly known as the Pan African Christian University College. It was the first private university to be established in the Central region.

== Controversies ==
The Kirk Franklin show attracting such amount of audience that exceeded the 14,000-capacity dome. The incapability of thousands of people to enter the place received criticism against the organisers, Multimedia Group, and the church.
