= Ministry of Transport (Ghana) =

Government ministry of Ghana

Agency overview
- Formed: 2009
- Jurisdiction: Republic of Ghana
- Headquarters: Accra, Ghana
- Minister responsible: Joseph Bukari
- Website: www.mot.gov.gh

The Ministry of Transport (MoT) of Ghana was created in January 2009. The ministry is responsible for the infrastructural development and service delivery in Ghana's transport industry.

== History of the Ministry ==
The ministry was formed from former agencies of two government ministries namely the Ministries of Roads and Highways and the Ministry of Transport and Communication in 2001 by the John Kufuor administration. After the merger, it was known as the Ministry of Roads and Transport. This name was changed in 2009 to the Ministry of Transport by the John Atta Mills administration. The purpose for the agency merger was to create an autonomous ministry that could effectively formulate and coordinate transport policies for the country.

== Scope of the Ministry ==
Over ninety percent of Ghana's international trade depends on the country's sea ports namely the Tema Harbour in the Greater Accra Region and the Takoradi harbour in the Western region. The ministry is responsible for the effective running of these trade entry points so that the economy of the country can develop. The activities of the ministry covers both the private and public sectors of Ghana's economy. The creation of favourable environment for investment into the country's transport industry is also a function of the ministry.

== Minister for Transport ==
The head of the Ministry of Transport is the Minister of Transport. It is a political appointment made by the President of Ghana subject to approval from the Parliament of Ghana. The sector minister during Nana Akufo-Addo's tenure was Kwaku Ofori Asiamah. He took over from Dzifa Ativor in 2013.

Joseph Bukari is the new minister of transport for the John Mahama's second term in office under the National Democratic Congress (Ghana) administration.

== See also ==
- Transport in Ghana
