= Daniel Nsala Wakpal =

Ghanaian politician

Hon Daniel Nsala Wakpal
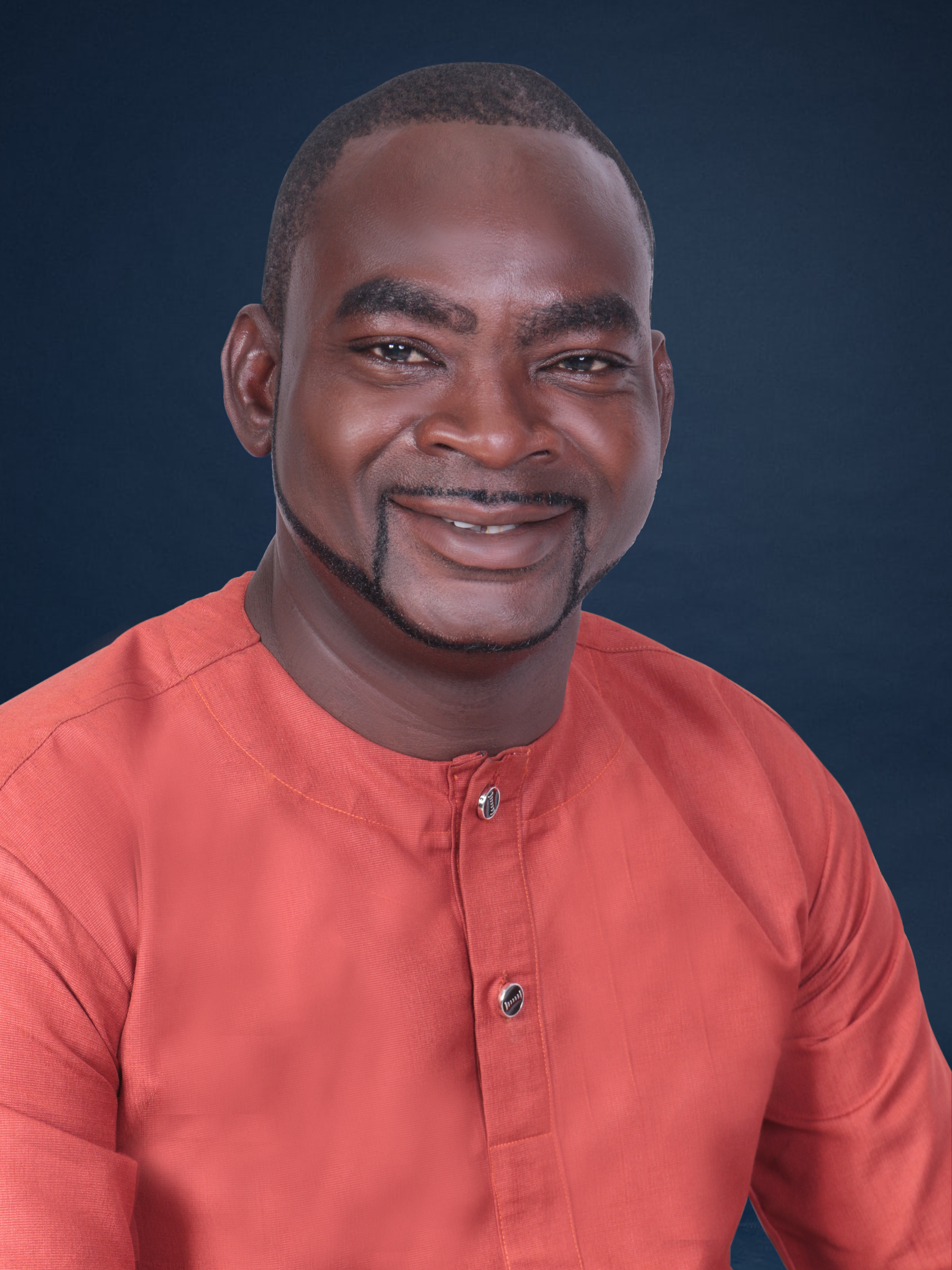

Member of the Ghana Parliament for Kpandai
- Incumbent
- Assumed office 7 January 2021

Personal details
- Born: Daniel Nsala Wakpal; 15 March 1975 (age 51) Saboba
- Party: National Democratic Congress
- Occupation: Politician
- Committees: House Committee, Environment, Science and Technology Committee

Daniel Nsala Wakpal (born 15 March 1975) is a Ghanaian politician and member of the National Democratic Congress. He is the member of parliament for the Kpandai Constituency, in the Northern Region of Ghana.

== Early life and education ==
Wakpal hails from Saboba. He holds a Master of Arts in Local Government Administration and Organisation.

== Personal life ==
Daniel Nsala Wakpal is a christian.
