= Matthew Nyindam =

Ghanaian politician (born 1975)

Member of the Ghana Parliament for Kpandai Constituency

Personal details
- Born: 1 December 1975 (age 50) Kumdi, Ghana
- Party: New Patriotic Party
- Education: University of Education, Winneba

Matthew Nyindam (born 1 December 1975) is a Ghanaian politician and member of the Seventh Parliament of the Fourth Republic of Ghana, representing the Kpandai constituency in the Northern Region on the ticket of the New Patriotic Party.

== Early life and education ==
Nyindam was born on 1 December 1975. He hails from Kumdi, a town in the Northern Region of Ghana. He entered University of Education, Winneba, obtaining a Bachelor in Education degree in Social Studies in 2007. He taught at Barekese Secondary School in the Ashanti region.

== Politics ==
Nyindam is a member of the New Patriotic Party (NPP). In 2012, he contested the Kpandai seat on the ticket of the NPP sixth parliament of the fourth republic and won.

=== 2012 election ===
Nyindam contested the Kpandai constituency in the Northern Region in 2012 Ghanaian general election on the ticket of the New Patriotic Party and won the election with 16,221 votes, representing 42.48% of the total votes. He won the election over Lipkalimor Kwajo Tawiah of the National Democratic Congress, Alfred Donkor Odzidzator (Independent), Bumarck Braimah Friko of the Convention People's Party, Mboko Nkrajimamo Yaw of the PPP and Aniwaba Kwaku Bediako Jeremiah of the NDP. They obtained 13,794 votes, 7,795 votes, 156 votes, 154 votes and 68 votes respectively, equivalent to 36.12%, 20.41%, 0.41%, 0.40% and 0.18% of the total votes respectively.

==== 2016 election ====
Nyindam was re-elected as a member of parliament for Kpandai constituency in the Northern Region on the ticket of the New Patriotic Party during the 2016 Ghanaian general election with 19,044 votes representing 50.14% of the total votes. He was elected over Lipkalimor Kwajo Tawiah of the National Democratic Congress who polled 18,301 votes representing 48.18%, parliamentary candidate for the PPP Muniru Salifu Ali Nnan had 463 votes which is equivalent to 1.22%, Inusah Rashid of the Convention people's party polled 90 votes representing 0.24% and the parliamentary candidate for the APC Donkor Eric Nipani had 85 votes, representing 0.22% of the total votes.

===== 2020 election =====
Nyindam again contested the Kpandai constituency) parliamentary seat on the ticket of the New Patriotic Party in the 2020 Ghanaian general election but lost the seat to Daniel Nsala Wakpal of the National Democratic Congress.

== Personal life ==
Nyindam is a Christian (Catholic). He is married and has four children.
