= Perez University College =

University in Ghana

- Type: Private
- Academic affiliations: University of Cape Coast
- Vice-Chancellor: Charles Agyinasare
- Location: Gomoa Pomadze, Central region, Ghana; 5°23′36.12628″N 0°39′15.32470″W
- Campus: Urban area Gomoa Pomadze
- Website: www.perez.edu.gh

Perez University College is a co-ed Christian University located in Gomoa Pomadze in the Central region of Ghana. It was formerly known as the Pan African Christian University College. It is the first private university to be established in the Central Region. It is affiliated with the University of Cape Coast.

== Chancellor ==
Charles Agyinasare is the Founder of the Perez University College.

== Programmes of studies ==
The university offers many graduate and post graduate degrees including:

- Bachelor in Business Administration Accounting
- Bachelor in Business Administration Banking and Finance
- Bachelor in Business Administration Human Resource Management
- Bachelor in Business Administration Marketing
- Bachelor in Biblical Studies
- Bachelor in Pastoral Care and Counselling
