= Kpandai (Ghana parliament constituency) =

Ghana parliament constituency

- constituency for the Parliament of Ghana
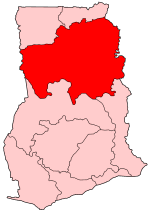
- District: Kpandai District
- Region: Northern Region of Ghana

Current constituency
- Party: New Patriotic Party
- MP: Matthew Nyindam

Kpandai is one of the constituencies represented in the Parliament of Ghana. It elects one Member of Parliament (MP) by the first past the post system of election. It is located in the Northern Region of Ghana. The current member of Parliament for the constituency is Mathew Nyindam. He was elected on the ticket of the New Patriotic Party (NPP).

== Boundaries ==
The seat is located within the Kpandai district of the Northern Region of Ghana.

== Members of Parliament ==
First elected	Member	Party
Created 1992
1992	Lipkalimor Kwajo Tawiah	National Democratic Congress
2012	Matthew Nyindam	New Patriotic Party
2020	Daniel Nsala Wakpal	National Democratic Congress
2024	Matthew Nyindam	New Patriotic Party

== Election results ==
|}The following table shows the parliamentary election results for Kpandai constituency in the 2024 Ghanaian general election

2024 Ghanaian general election. : Kpandai Source:Ghana Home Page
Party	Candidate	Votes	%	±%
New Patriotic Party	Matthew Nyindam	27,647	53.47	—
National Democratic Congress	Daniel Nsala Wakpal	24,213	46.33%	—
APC	Donkor Eric Nipani	104	0.20	—
Majority		27,647	53.47	—

|}The following table shows the parliamentary election results for Kpandai constituency in the 2020 Ghanaian general election.

2020 Ghanaian general election. : Kpandai Source:Ghana Home Page
Party	Candidate	Votes	%	±%
National Democratic Congress	Daniel Nsala Wakpal	25,741	51.92	—
New Patriotic Party	Matthew Nyindam	23,669	47.74	—
Convention People's Party	Ambasagna Ekusu John	135	0.27	—
APC	Donkor Eric Nipani	37	0.07	—
Majority		25, 741	51.92	—

The following table shows the parliamentary election results for Kpandai constituency during the 2016 Ghanaian general election.

2016 Ghanaian parliamentary election: Kpandai Source:Ghana Home Page
Party	Candidate	Votes	%	±%
New Patriotic Party	Matthew Nyindam	19,044	50.14	—
National Democratic Congress	Likpalimor Kwajo Tawiah	18,301	48.18	—
Progressive People's Party	Muniru Salifu Ali Nnan	463	1.22	—
Convention People's Party	Inusah Rashid	90	0.24	—
APC	Donkor Eric Nipani	85	0.22	—
Majority		19,044	50.14	—

The below table shows the parliamentary election results for Kpandai constituency in the 2012 Ghanaian general election.

2012 Ghanaian parliamentary election: Kpandai Source:Ghana Home Page
Party	Candidate	Votes	%	±%
New Patriotic Party	Matthew Nyindam	16,221	42.48	—
National Democratic Congress	Likpalimor Kwajo Tawiah	13,794	36.12	—
IND	Alfred Donkor Odzidzator	7, 795	20.42	—
Convention People's Party	Bumarck Braimah Friko	156	0.41	—
Progressive People's Party	Mboko Nkrajimoamo Yaw	154	0.40	—
NRP	Aniwaba Kwaku Bediako Jeremiah	68	0.18	—
Majority		16,221	42.48	—

The following table shows the parliamentary election results for Kpandai constituency during the 2008 Ghanaian general election.

2008 Ghanaian parliamentary election: Kpandai Source:Ghana Home Page
Party	Candidate	Votes	%	±%
National Democratic Congress	Likpalimor Kwajo Tawiah	10,391	37.24	—
New Patriotic Party	Albert Kofi Bow	9,839	35.26	—
IND	Timothy Barnabas Nakoja	2, 922	10.47	—
IND	Daniel Nsala Wakpal	2, 054	7.36	—
IND	Habib Issaka	1, 685	6.04	—
IND	Nyimakan Alijah Mayor	752	2.69	—
Convention People's Party	Mohammed Abukari Gobar	262	0.94	—
Majority		10,391	37.24	—

The below table shows the parliamentary election results for Kpandai constituency during the 2004 Ghanaian general election.

2004 Ghanaian parliamentary election: Kpandai Source:Ghana Home Page
Party	Candidate	Votes	%	±%
National Democratic Congress	Likpalimor Kwajo Tawiah	11,915	41.10	—
IND	Daniel Nsala Wakpal	9,177	31.60	—
New Patriotic Party	Kpajal Kwasi James	7, 460	25.70	—
Convention People's Party	Kpajal Kwasi James	445	1.50	—
Majority		11, 915	41.10	—

The table below shows the parliamentary election results for Kpandai constituency in the 2000 Ghanaian general election.

2000 Ghanaian parliamentary election: Kpandai Source:Ghana Home Page
Party	Candidate	Votes	%	±%
National Democratic Congress	Likpalimor Kwajo Tawiah	13,368	54.20	—
IND	Nana J.K Bukum	7,582	30.70	—
New Patriotic Party	Kpajal Kwasi James	1, 617	6.60	—
IND	Nakola Kakuja	892	3.60	—
NRP	Mbo K Samuel	431	1.70	—
Convention People's Party	Awal A Mohammed	396	1.60	—
UGM	Yussif Issahaq	214	0.90	—
People's National Convention	Addae J Bawa	174	0.70	—
Majority		13,368	54.20	—

The following table shows the parliamentary election results for Kpandai constituency during the 1996 Ghanaian general election.

1996 Ghanaian parliamentary election: Kpandai Source:Ghana Home Page
Party	Candidate	Votes	%	±%
National Democratic Congress	Likpalimor Kwajo Tawiah	18,698	50.30	—
IND	Konde Paul Evans Dawuni	9,729	26.20	—
New Patriotic Party	Kpajal Kwasi James	4, 081	11.00	—
Majority		18, 698	50.30	—

== 2024 parliamentary election petition ==
After the 2024 parliamentary election in Kpandai the National Democratic Congress (Ghana) Candidate Daniel Nsala Wakpal filed an election petition at the Tamale High Court challenging the Electoral Commission's declaration of Matthew Nyindam as the winner. In November 2025 the Tamale High Court annulled the elections and ordered for a re-run. On December 16, 2025, the Supreme Court of Ghana suspended all arrangement for the re-run scheduled for December 30, 2025, and case adjourned to January 13, 2026.

== See also ==
- List of Ghana Parliament constituencies
