= Doris Asibi Seidu =

Ghanaian politician

Hon. Doris Asibi Seidu

Member of the Ghana Parliament for Chereponi
- In office 2005 – 2009 (died in office)
- Preceded by: Mohammed Seidu Abah
- Succeeded by: Samuel Abdulai Jabanyite

Personal details
- Born: 1961 Accra, Ghana
- Died: 31 July 2009 (aged 39–40) Korle-Bu Teaching Hospital, Accra, Ghana
- Party: New Patriotic Party
- Education: Tamale College of Education

Doris Asibi Seidu was a Ghanaian educationist, social worker and politician who served as the member of parliament for the Chereponi from 2005 to 2009 when she died in office. She was the first female to represent the constituency in parliament.

== Early life and education ==
Doris was born in 1969 in Accra, Ghana. She studied at the Bimbilla Training College from 1986 to 1990, and the Tamale Training College where she obtained her teachers' Certificate 'A' in 1995.

== Career and politics ==
Doris was a teacher and a social worker by profession.

In 2004 she contested for the Chereponi seat on the ticket of the New Patriotic Party and won. In 2008, she won the seat once more, polling 9,188 votes out of the 17,559 valid votes, representing 52.33% of the entire votes cast. She remained in parliament until her death on 31 July 2009. A by-election was held on 29 September 2009 and Samuel Abdulai Jabanyite of the National Democratic Congress won the seat. While a member of parliament, she aided in a number of development projects such as electrification of communities in the constituency, building of schools and clinics, and also giving scholarships to brilliant and needy students in the constituency. In parliament she served on various committees some of which include; the Education and Mines committee, and the Energy committee.

== Personal life ==
Doris was a Muslim. She was married and had a child.

== Death ==
Doris died around 11:30 pm on Friday, 31 July 2009 at the Korle-Bu Teaching Hospital in Accra. According to reports, she died as a result of a severe cardiac arrest and heart-related complications. She also had problems with her kidney, a sickness she had been battling for sometime. Due to her health situation, she had been absent from parliamentary sittings for sometime. She died at the age of 40. She was survived by her husband and a child.

During an interview with the Daily Guide in February 2009, she said; "her greatest priority would be to make her constituency a peaceful place where ethnicity would be a thing of the past and also to generate employment avenues for her constituents; especially women and the youth."

== See also ==
- List of MPs elected in the 2004 Ghanaian parliamentary election
- List of MPs elected in the 2008 Ghanaian parliamentary election
- Chereponi (Ghana parliament constituency)
