= Saboba (Ghana parliament constituency) =

Ghana parliament constituency

- constituency for the Parliament of Ghana
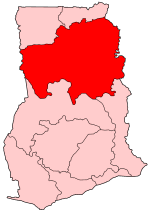
- District: Saboba/Chereponi District
- Region: Northern Region of Ghana

Current constituency
- Party: National Democratic Congress
- MP: Bukari Nikpe Joseph

Saboba is one of the constituencies represented in the Parliament of Ghana. It elects one Member of Parliament (MP) by the first past the post system of election. It is located in the Northern Region of Ghana.

The current member of Parliament for the constituency is Bukari Nikpe Joseph. He was elected on the ticket of the National Democratic Congress (NDC) and won a majority of 1,387 votes more than candidate closest in the race, to win the constituency election to become the MP. He succeeded Charles Binipom Bintin who had represented the constituency in the 4th Republican parliament on the ticket of the New Patriotic Party (NPP).

== See also ==
- List of Ghana Parliament constituencies
