= Gomoa Pomadze =

Gomoa Pomadze is a town in the Central region of Ghana. It is close to Winneba on the Cape Coast-Accra highway. It is the site for Perez University College which was the first private university to be established in the Central region. Nana Apata Kofi V is the chief of the town.
