= Chereponi District =

District in North East Region, Ghana

- District
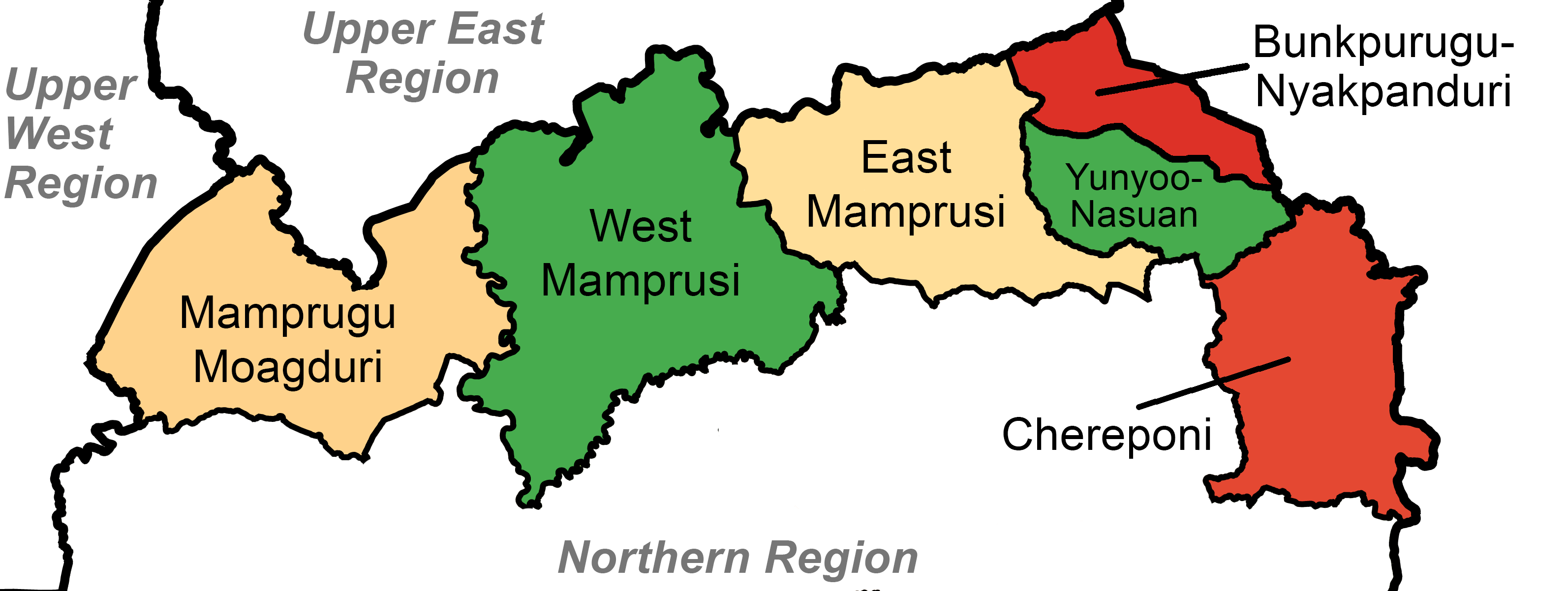
- Districts of North East Region

- Location of Chereponi District within North East
- Coordinates: 10°8′16.8″N 0°17′27.6″E
- Country: Ghana
- Region: North East
- Capital: Chereponi

Government
  - District Executive: Abdul Razak Tahidu

Population (2021)
  - Total: 87,176
- Time zone: UTC+0 (GMT)
- ISO 3166 code: GH-NE-CH

Chereponi District is one of the six districts in North East Region, Ghana. Originally it was formerly part of the then-larger Saboba-Chereponi District in 1988, which was created from the former East Dagomba District Council, until the northern portion of the district was split off to become Chereponi District on 29 February 2008; thus the remaining part has been renamed as Saboba District (which is currently part of Northern Region). The district assembly is located in the southeast part of North East Region and has Chereponi as its capital town.

The Chereponi district has recently faced a challenges regarding their only sources and main road to Yendi which is making it difficult for them to transport themselves and their farm products to the towns for supply.
