= Dzifa Attivor =

Ghanaian politician and businesswoman (1956-2021)

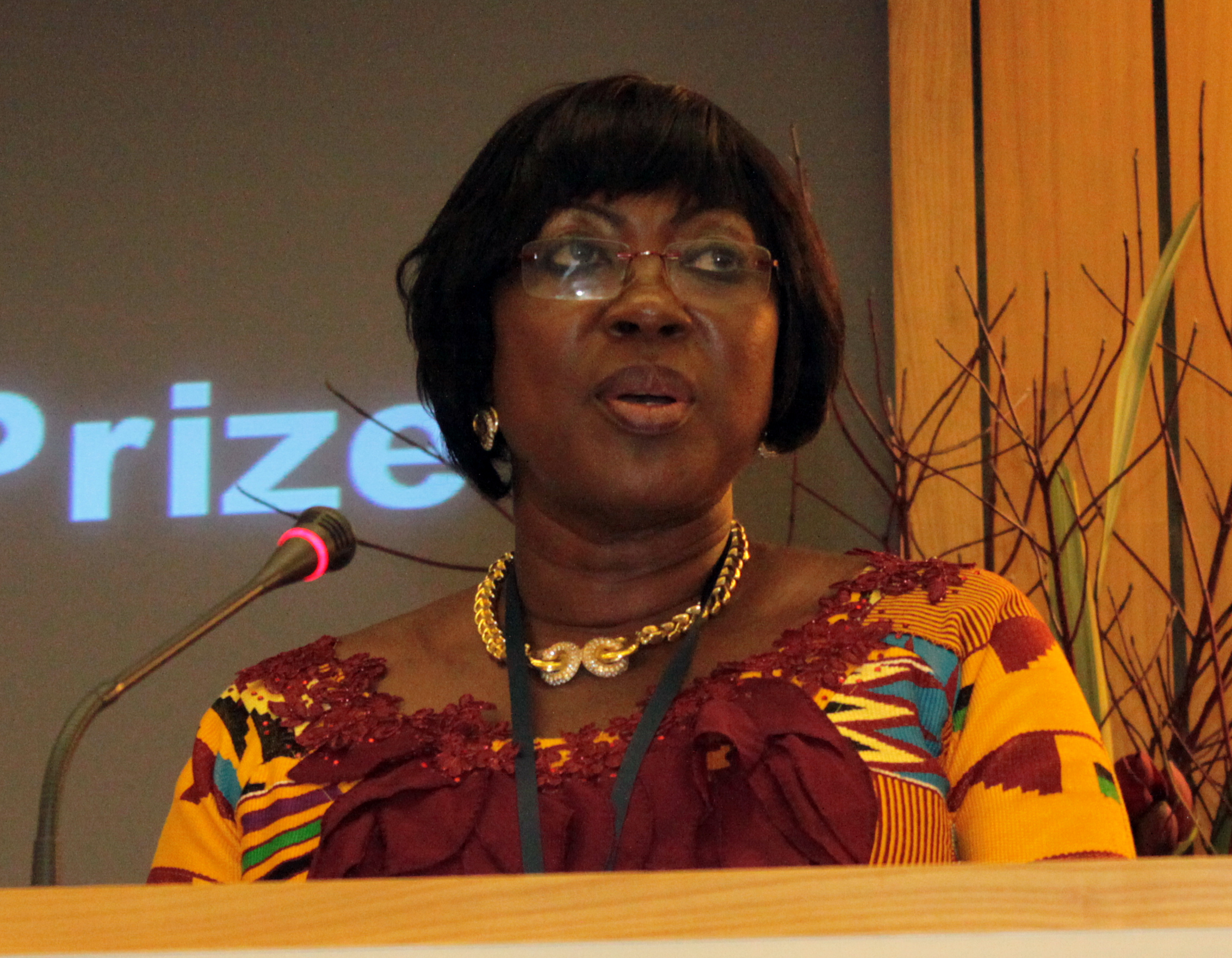
- Attivor in 2013

Minister for Transport
- In office 14 February 2013 – December 2015
- President: John Mahama
- Preceded by: Collins Dauda
- Succeeded by: Fiifi Kwetey

Deputy Minister for Transport
- In office 2009 – January 2012
- President: John Atta Mills
- Succeeded by: Fiifi Kwetey

Personal details
- Born: Dzifa Aku Attivor; 22 February 1956
- Died: 15 November 2021 (aged 65) Accra, Ghana
- Party: National Democratic Congress
- Spouse: Raphael Napoleon Kwaku (died 2019)
- Children: 3
- Education: Peki Senior High School; American Century University
- Occupation: Politician
- Profession: Secretary, Businesswoman

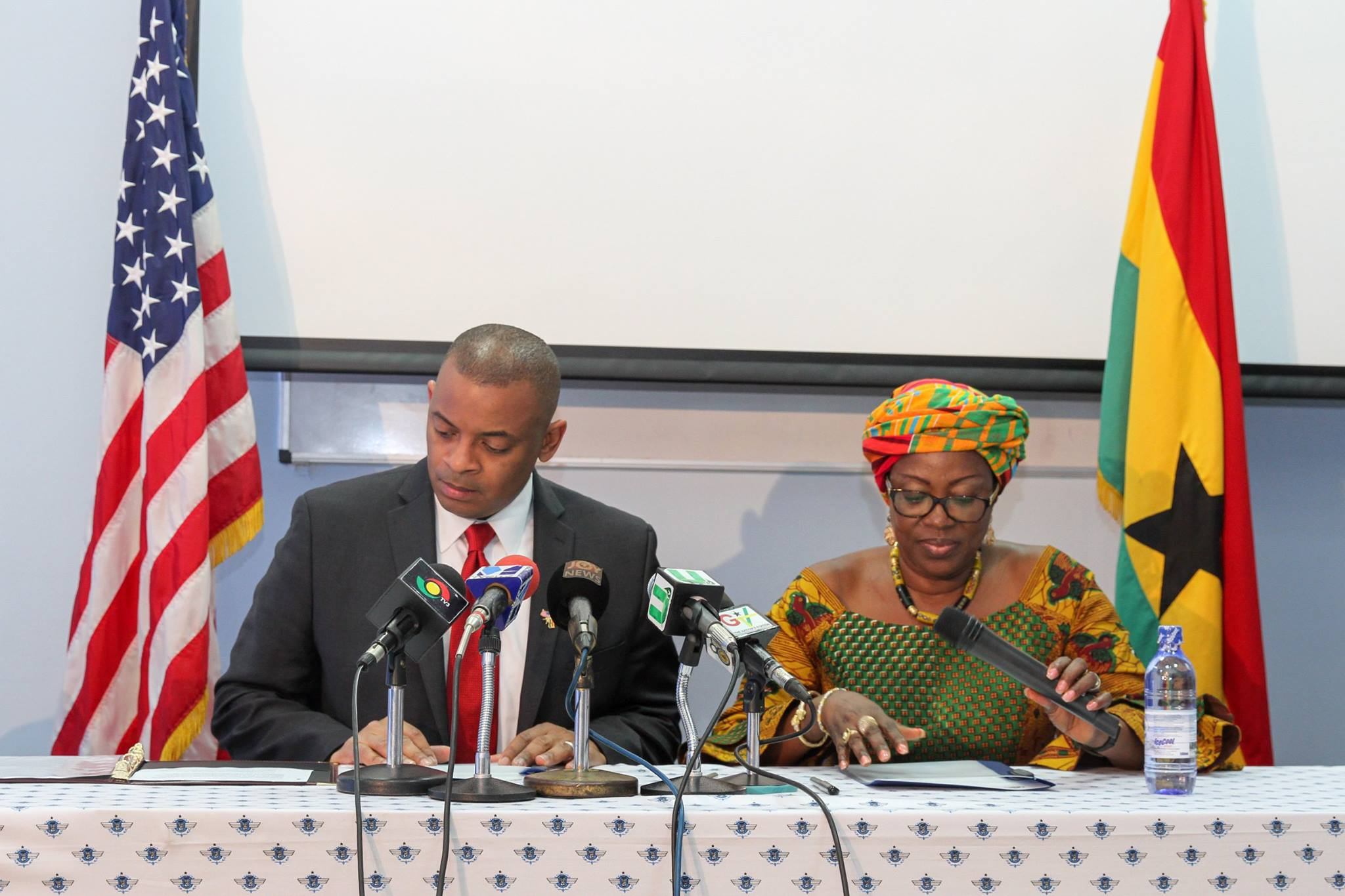
Anthony Foxx (left), U.S. Secretary of Transport, and Dzifa Attivor sign a declaration of intent to provide technical assistance and support to the Ghana Aviation Training Academy.

Dzifa Aku Attivor (22 February 1956 – 15 November 2021) was a Ghanaian politician and businesswoman. She was Minister for Transport in Ghana until her resignation in December 2015 due to a controversial bus re-branding contract. She was appointed in February 2013 by President John Mahama after the Ghanaian general election in December 2012.

== Early life and education ==
Dzifa Aku Attivor was born on 22 February 1956. She started her basic education at the Evangelical Presbyterian Primary School at Abutia-Teti between 1960 and 1970. Her secondary education was at the Kpedze Secondary School and the Peki Secondary School, both in the Volta Region of Ghana between 1970 and 1975. She then trained at the Government Secretarial School qualifying as a Stenographer Secretary in 1981. She later obtained a Secretarial Silver Diploma from Pitman College UK. Her graduate qualifications are from the American Century University where she obtained a Bachelor of Science degree in Administration in 2007 and a master's degree in Human Resource Management in 2012.

== Career ==
Attivor worked with the Bank of Ghana from 1976 to 2003 as a research clerk and then as a Personal Assistant to three successive Deputy Governors. She also became the Personal Assistant to the head of treasury in charge of all general office administrative work in the same bank.

=== Minister for Transport ===
Attivor was a member of the National Democratic Congress. She contested the Ho West constituency primaries of the NDC in 2008 but lost to Emmanuel Kwasi Bedzrah who subsequently won the elections in December 2008. She was however appointed Deputy Minister for Transport by late President John Atta Mills from 2009 to January 2012. After John Dramani Mahama became president, she was appointed the substantive Minister for Transport. She resigned from the government in December 2015 following controversy over the government's contract for the rebranding of buses.

=== Dedefund ===
After leaving government, Attivor moved into private business. She also set up a non-governmental organization named "Dedefund" which is dedicated to the support of brilliant but needy children, the course of women and the youth, the NGO also cares for the 120 cured lepers at Schohaven Village located in Ho in the Volta Region.

=== Regional Chairperson bid ===
Attivor made her intentions known publicly and launched her campaign to become the Volta Regional Chairperson of the National Democratic Congress in August 2018. She campaigned on the ideas of changing the norm by selecting a female to head the region and the fact that the incumbent government had failed in delivering their promises, but she lost the elections and urged the members and other supporters to rally behind the winner and ensure a collective win for their party. She was defeated in the elections in September 2018 after garnering 374 votes against the winner John Kudzo Gyapong, the incumbent who had 491 votes.

=== International work ===
Attivor was appointed the chairperson for the ECOWAS Medical Village (EMV) and Eco-medical taking over from Peter Ahiekpor who doubled as the chief executive officer and chairperson, but had been moved to only serve as the CEO whilst Attivor served as the chair for the medical project. EMV is a private sector initiative focused on putting up an internationally rated hospital complex for the use of residents within the West African subregion to reduce the number of citizens who go out of West Africa to receive treatment in South Africa, North America, Europe, Cuba and India. Her role was overseer of the EMV's formation. The village is being built on a 40-acre land in Accra, Ghana, with satellite hospital units in all other West African countries. The firm also supplies medical, mobility and accessibility equipment to countries within the subregion.

== Personal life ==
Attivor was married to Raphael Napoleon Kwaku Attivor, who died in 2019. She had three children, and was a member of the Evangelical Presbyterian Church, Ghana.

Attivor died on 16 November 2021, at the University of Ghana Medical Centre, after a brief illness at the age of 65.

== See also ==
- List of Mahama government ministers
- National Democratic Congress

Political offices
Preceded by Collins Dauda	Minister for Transport; 2013–2015	Succeeded by Fiifi Kwetey
