= Dzifa Gomashie =

Ghanaian politician and former actress

Hon. Dzifa Abla Gomashie
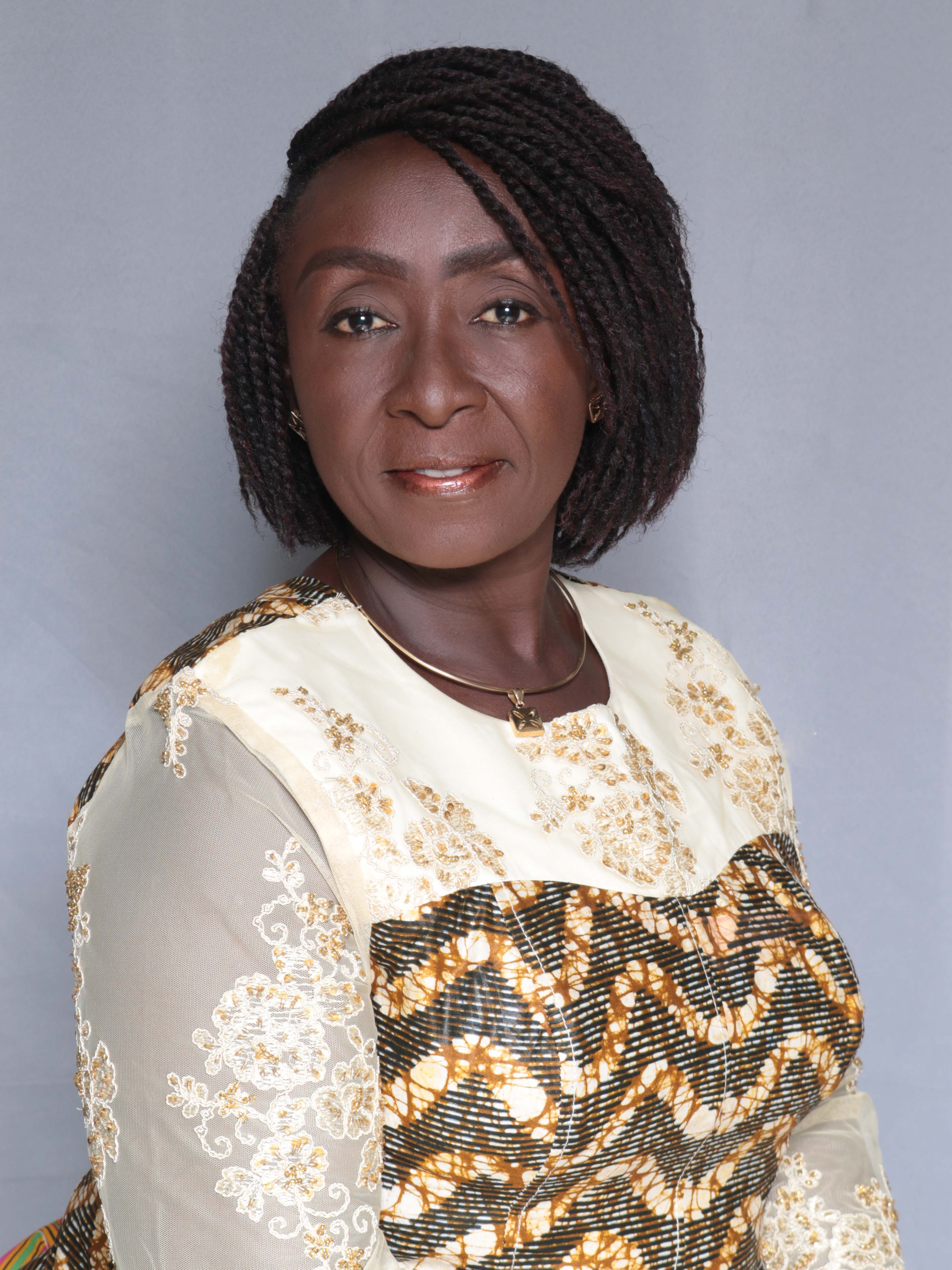

Member of Parliament for Ketu South Constituency
- Incumbent
- Assumed office 7 January 2021

Minister for Ministry of Tourism, Arts & Culture
- Incumbent
- Assumed office 2025
- President: John Dramani Mahama
- Preceded by: Andrew Egyapa Mercer

Deputy Minister for Ministry of Tourism, Arts & Culture
- In office 2013–2017
- President: John Dramani Mahama
- Preceded by: Ziblim Iddi
- Succeeded by: Mark Okraku-Mantey

Personal details
- Born: Dzifa Abla Gomashie; 5 July 1965 (age 61) Ghana
- Party: National Democratic Congress
- Spouse: Martin K.G Ahiaglo
- Children: 1
- Education: St. Louis Senior High School (Ghana); University of Ghana; Institute of African Studies
- Occupation: Actress, theatrical producer, screen scriptwriter, politician

Ablah Dzifa Gomashie (born 5 July 1965) is a Ghanaian female veteran actress, producer, screen scriptwriter and a politician. She is currently the parliamentary candidate of the NDC in the Ketu South Constituency and a queen-mother in the Aflao Traditional Area.

She was the Deputy Minister of Tourism between 2013 and 2017 during President John Mahama's first term and the substantive sector minister in the Mahama government from 2025.

== Education ==
Gomashie was born in Accra to Mr Patrick Dotse Gomashie and Helen Gomashie. She hails from Aflao in the Volta region and was born on July 5, 1965. She had her secondary level education at St. Louis Senior High School in Kumasi and then furthered at the University of Ghana, where she acquired a diploma in Theatre Arts, a bachelor's degree in Theatre Management and an MPhil in African Studies from the Institute of African Studies.

== Career ==
Gomashie's began her actress career in 1985 when she joined the Talents Theatre Company. She has featured in plays like Black Star, Mambo, Chaka the Zulu, Jogolo and The Third Woman. She has also starred in several movies including: Ghost Tears, House of Pain, Heart of Gold and a number of National Arts NAFTI student productions. She is also a script writer who wrote and produced 'By The Fire Side', a GTV programme that used story-telling to encourage children to read more and to develop their reading skills but is currently on hold due to lack of sponsors.

Aside acting, she owned a restaurant called 'Mama's Kitchen' at Ashale Botwe, which is no longer in operation.

== Politics ==
In 2013, she was nominated and appointed into office as the deputy Minister of Tourism, Arts & Culture by President John Dramani Mahama, a position she held until her party, the NDC lost the elections and handed over to the next government in 2017.

=== 2020 General Election ===
On 24 August 2019, she contested the primaries of the National Democratic Congress (Ghana) and won the bid to represent the Ketu South constituency on the ticket of the National Democratic Congress (NDC) in the 2020 elections with 586 votes while the other contestants, Foga Nukunu, Joseph Nyavi and Nicholas Worklatsi lost with 555, 294 and 302 votes respectively.

In the 2020 Ghanaian general election, she won the Ketu South (Ghana parliament constituency) for the National Democratic Congress (Ghana) with 84,664 votes beating the New Patriotic Party's candidate, David Quarshie who polled 14,904 votes making her the first female member of parliament for the constituency.

=== 2024 General Election ===
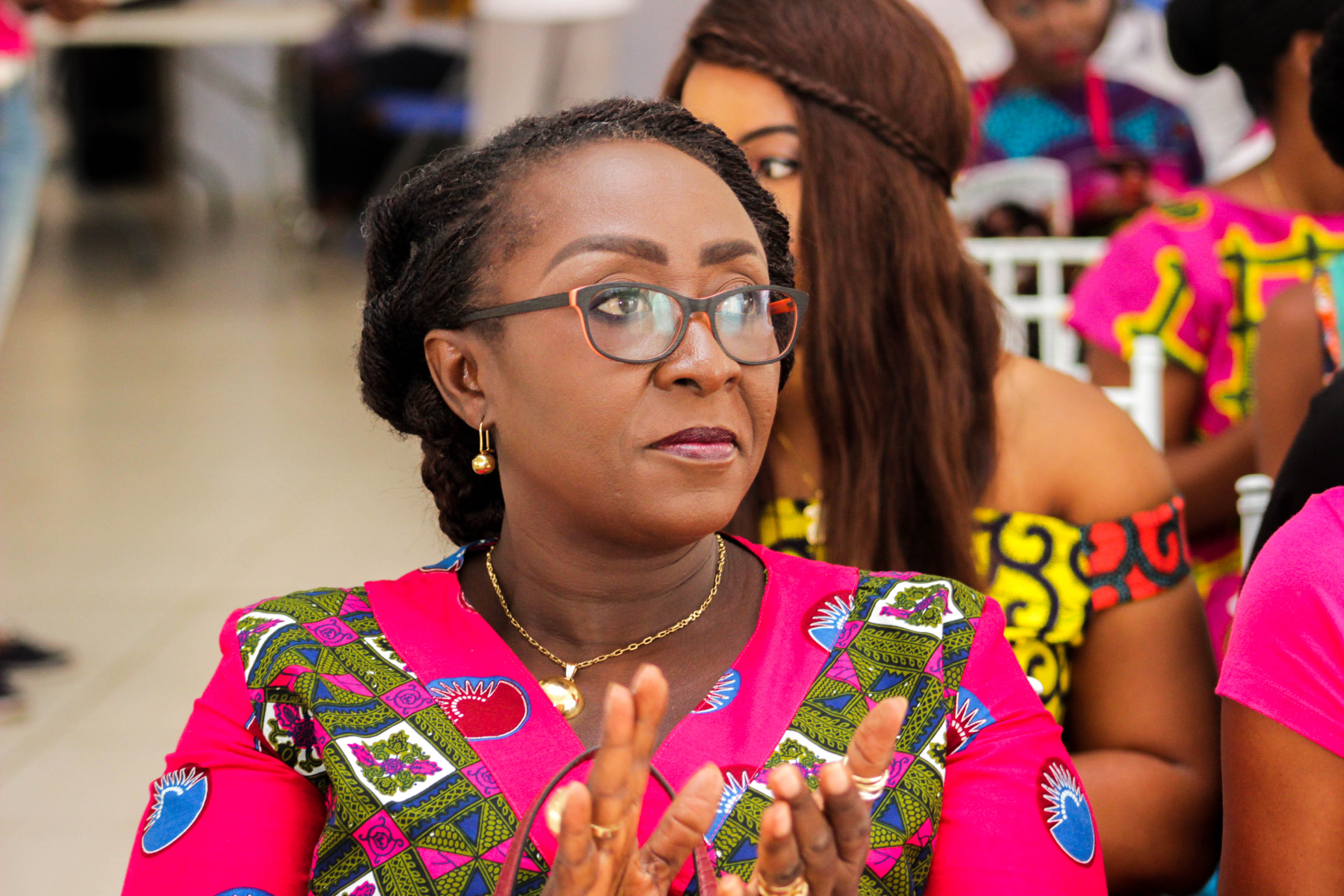
Abla Dzifa Gomashie is a Ghanaian politician and currently Minister of Tourism, Culture and Creative Arts

In May 2023, she contested the National Democratic Congress (Ghana) primaries and won with 1,545 votes to retain parliamentary candidacy of the NDC.

In the December 2024 elections, she was re-elected as the Member of Parliament for the Ketu South constituency, winning her second consecutive term. She received 78,902 votes, accounting for 92.9% of the total votes cast. This result reflected significant support from the constituency.

In January 2025, She was appointed by the President to be the Minister of Tourism, Culture and Creative Arts.

Appearing before the Appointments Committee of Parliament, Dzifa Gomashie lamented the inadequate infrastructure needed to meet both domestic and international demand of the tourism industry.

As Minister for Tourism, Culture and Creative Arts, Gomashie called for an investigation by the Attorney-General into alleged procurement breaches and audit discrepancies involving GH¢33 million in the tourism sector on 21 May 2026. She also raised concerns about the condition of Ghana’s forts and castles, warning that some sites risked losing their UNESCO World Heritage status, and reiterated government efforts to revive the Marine Drive tourism project.

=== Committees ===
Gomashie is a member of the Poverty Reduction Strategy Committee and also a member of the Trade, Industry and Tourism Committee.

== Personal life ==
Gomashie was married to the late Martin K.G Ahiaglo. The couple had no child together. Dzifa had a son from a previous relationship. She is a Christian

== Honor ==
She was honored by the organizers of 3Music Awards for her achievement in the entertainment industry in Ghana.
