= Kwaku Ofori Asiamah =

Ghanaian politician

Minister for Transport
- In office February 2017 – January 2025
- President: Nana Akufo-Addo
- Preceded by: Fiifi Kwetey
- Succeeded by: Joseph Bukari Nikpe

Personal details
- Born: Kwaku Ofori Asiamah Ghana
- Party: New Patriotic Party
- Education: Ghana Secondary School, Koforidua; Accra Academy
- Alma mater: University of Cape Coast
- Occupation: politician & businessman.

Kwaku Ofori Asiamah is a Ghanaian politician and businessman who served as Minister for Transport in Ghana under the cabinet of President Nana Akufo-Addo from 2017 to 2025.

== Early life ==
Kwaku Ofori Asiamah hails from Dominase in the Central Region of Ghana in the Upper Denkyira West District. He had his O’level education at Ghana Secondary School, Koforidua from 1985 to 1990 and his A’ level Education at Accra Academy from 1990 to 1992. Asiamah graduated from the University of Cape Coast with a bachelor of commerce degree.

== Private career ==
Asiamah had his national service at the Ghana Ports and Harbours Authority in Tema. From 2002 to 2004, he worked as Marketing Manager at Household Aluminium Company. He also worked at Quest Resource Development Consultancy. He established his own business, Josa Plus Ventures and was general manager of the business from 2004 to 2017.

== Politics ==
Asiamah served as a member of NPP campaign team in the Central Region in 2008, 2012 and 2016. He has been serving as a member of National Council of the New Patriotic Party (NPP) from 2009.

== Cabinet minister ==
In May 2017, President Nana Akufo-Addo named Kwaku Ofori Asiamah as part of nineteen ministers who would form his cabinet. The names of the 19 ministers were submitted to the Parliament of Ghana and announced by the Speaker of the House, Rt. Hon. Prof. Mike Ocquaye. As a Cabinet minister, Kwaku Ofori Asiamah is part of the inner circle of the president and is to aid in key decision-making activities in the country.
