= Saboba-Chereponi District =

- Former District
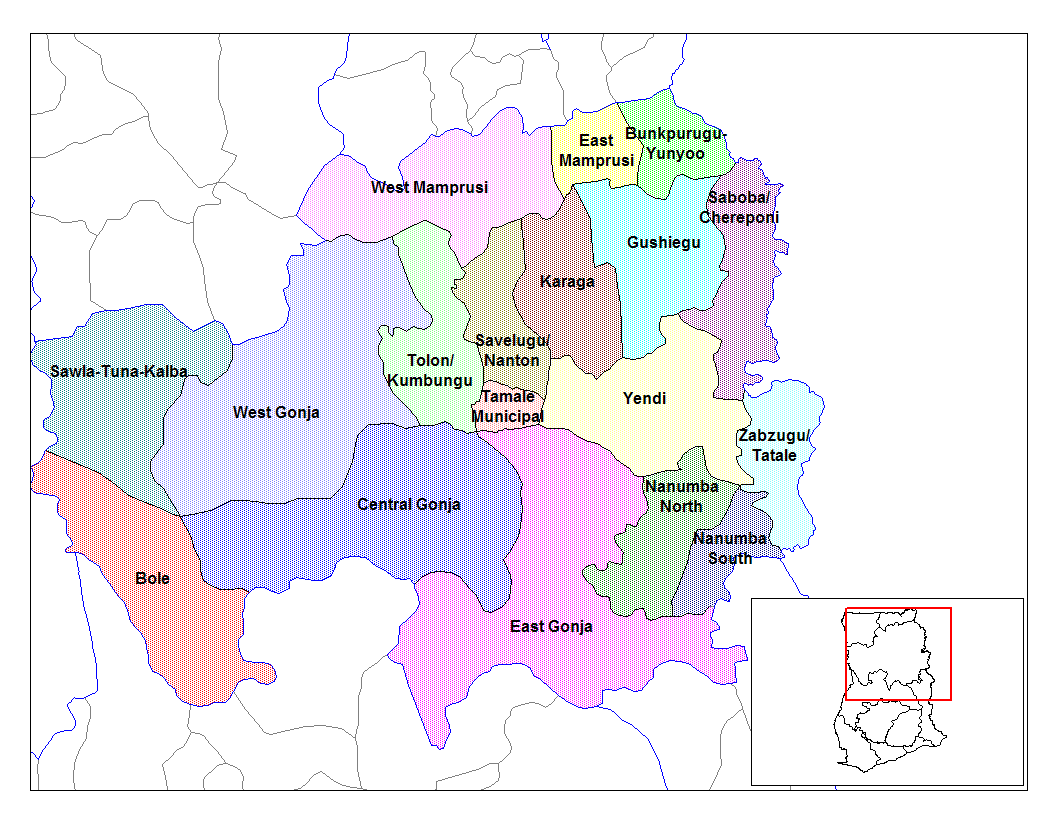
- Districts of Northern Region

- Location of Saboba-Chereponi District within Northern
- Coordinates: 9°42′23.76″N 0°18′59.4″E
- Country: Ghana
- Region: Northern
- Capital: Saboba

Government
  - District Executive: David Nyame

Area
  - Total: 3,439 km^{2} (1,328 sq mi)

Population (2013)
  - Total: —
- Time zone: UTC+0 (GMT)
- ISO 3166 code: GH-NP-SC

Saboba-Chereponi District is a former district that was located in Northern Region, Ghana. Originally created as an ordinary district assembly in 1988, which was created from the former East Dagomba District Council. However on 29 February 2008, it was split off into two new districts: Saboba District (which remains as part of Northern Region; capital: Saboba) and Chereponi District (which is currently part of North East Region; capital: Chereponi). The district assembly was located in the northeast part of Eastern Region and had Saboba as its capital town.

== Geography ==
Saboba-Chereponi District is a savannah district, hot grasslands with scattered scrub trees are the norm. Summer daytime temperatures may reach 45 °C with regularity. Average monthly temperatures range from 25 to 35 °C.

== Weather ==
The harmattan winds carry fine dust, from the end of November through the end of March. Dry heat follows until the rainy season of June to October when sudden, torrential rains flood the area. There is often reduced rainfall, which hinders hydroelectric production, and causes frequent rolling blackouts.

== Health ==
Health care is provided at the Saboba Medical Centre, the district regional healthcare facility.

== Tourism ==
Saboba, the capital of the district, has guesthouses available for tourists. There are few tourist attractions in the Saboba-Chereponi district.

== Transport ==
Transportation to Saboba is available from Yendi.

== Economy ==
=== Agriculture ===
Subsistence agriculture is the economic norm in the Saboba-Chereponi District.

== Sources ==
- Saboba-Chereponi District
- A road density report
- Saboba Medical Centre
