= Albert Kwasi Zigah =

Ghanaian politician

Hon. Albert Kwasi Zigah

Member of Ghana Parliament for Ketu South Constituency
- In office 7 January 2005 – 6 January 2013

Personal details
- Born: 15 November 1959 (age 66) Aflao, Volta Region Ghana
- Party: National Democratic Congress
- Children: 6
- Education: Ghana Institute of Management and Public Administration
- Occupation: Politician
- Profession: Transport Owner

Albert Kwasi Zigah (born 15 November 1959) is a Ghanaian Politician and a member of the Fifth Parliament of the Fourth Republic of Ghana representing the Ketu South Constituency in the Volta Region of Ghana.

== Early life and education ==
Zigah was born on the 15 November 1959 in Aflao in the Volta Region of Ghana. He attended the Ghana Institute of Management and Public Administration(GIMPA) in 2008.

== Career ==
Zigah worked with the Ghana Private Road Transport Union(GPRTU) of the Trade Union Congress(TUC) as the chairman of the Aflao branch(Transport Owner).

== Politics ==
=== Member of parliament ===
Zigah was first elected into parliament in 2004 on the ticket of the National Democratic Congress(NDC) during the 2005 Ghanaian general elections as the member of parliament for the Ketu South Constituency. During the elections, he polled 48,279 votes out of the 70,564 votes cast representing 68.40%. He again contested in the 2008 Ghanaian general elections and retained his seat with 54,720 votes out of the 61,011 valid votes cast representing 89.69%. He served two terms as a Parliamentarian. He was a member of the parliamentary select committee on Local government and Transport.

=== NDC Sued ===
Zigah was disqualified by his party from contesting the parliamentary primary conducted on 29 December 2015. He filed a writ at the Accra High Court and seeking a declaration that his disqualification from contesting the parliamentary primary for Ketu South Constituency of the NDC was unlawful, null, and void and of no effect whatsoever. He stated in the view of unlawful disqualification that, he was denied the opportunity to offer himself as a participant in the primary, hence his action to seek those reliefs.

== Personal life ==
Zigah is married with six children. He is a Christian and a member of the Catholic Church.
