= Chereponi =

- District Capital
- Location of Chereponi in North East region
- Coordinates: 10°11′39.3493″N 0°17′50.3434″W
- Country: Ghana
- Region: North East region
- District: Chereponi District
- Elevation: 560 ft (170 m)

Population (2013)
  - Total: —
- Time zone: GMT
  - Summer (DST): GMT

Chereponi is a small town and is the capital of the Chereponi district, a district in the North East Region of Ghana. As a district, Chereponi has a viable market which spends every 8 days.

== Sub-communities ==
- Angor
- Chombosu
- Bajani
- Wenchiki
- Tusunga
- Nasoni
- Jakpa
- Masawuse
- Ando
- Tanja
- Famisah
- Mayamam
- Jimbili
- Kabilani
- Nyangbandi
- Ando-Chere
- Tosala
- Garinkuka
- Tinchangu
- Wonjuga
- Yorgu

== Geographical location ==
In the North East Region, Chereponi is one of Ghana's border towns to neighbouring Togo. Wonjuga is the village where the Ghana-Togo border is pitched. It has the Customs, and Immigration Officers stationed on the same plot. From Chereponi, one could enter Togo (Sansanne Mango) or Sankansi after crossing the border. Yorgu is the last Ghanaian village nestled closed to the Comoe River before crossing into Togo.

== District Assembly ==
The Chereponi town is the District Capital of the Chereponi District. It has a district assembly which was inaugurated in 2008 during the reigns of Hon. Doris Seidu Asibi. Hon Alhaji Mohammed Seidu Issah Abbah served as the first district chief executive. Following the reigns of Hon Issah Abbah, are four more DCEs. Currently, the district assembly is headed by the District Chief Executive, Hon. Amadu Kofi Sheini who is barely 8 months old in office following his appointment by President John Dramani Mahama who emerged as winner of the December 2024 General Elections in Ghana.

== Electoral Areas, Assembly Members and Presiding Officer ==
The District has a number of electoral areas, Assembly Members and both past and present Presiding Officers. Currently, the Hon. Elijah Tamanja, the Assembly Member for Tambong electoral area, the Presiding Member (PM) after succeeding the Hon. Abdul Rahman-Sharif, the former Assembly Member for Chereponi West.

== Major Government Facilities in the District ==
The district capital has a number of infrastructural facilities namely: the Chereponi Government Hospital, The Chereponi Senior High Technical School (CHESTECH), the Chereponi Education Directorate, the Chereponi District Magistrate Court, the Police Station, the Health Insurance Office, the District Assembly, the Community Center, the Post Office (now temporary place for District Electoral Commission Office), Water and Sanitation Office, the Agenda 111 Hospital (Uncompleted), and others that are not captured.
