= Mohammed Seidu Abah =

Ghanaian politician

Hon. Mohammed Seidu Abah

Member of Parliament for Chereponi Constituency
- In office 7 January 2001 – 6 January 2005
- President: John Kufuor

Personal details
- Party: National Democratic Congress
- Profession: Politician

Mohammed Seidu Abah is a Ghanaian politician and was the member of parliament for the Chereponi constituency in the Northern region of Ghana. He was a member of parliament in the 3rd parliament of the 4th republic of Ghana.

== Politics ==
Abah is a member of the National Democratic Congress. He was elected as the member of parliament for the Chereponi constituency in the Northern region in the 3rd parliament of the 4th republic of Ghana. He was succeeded by Doris A. Seidu in the 2004 Ghanaian General elections.

Abah was elected as the member of parliament for the Chereponi constituency in the 2000 Ghanaian general elections. He was elected on the ticket of the National Democratic Congress. His constituency was a part of the 18 parliamentary seats out of 23 seats won by the National Democratic Congress in that election for the Northern Region. The National Democratic Congress won a minority total of 92 parliamentary seats out of 200 seats in the 3rd parliament of the 4th republic of Ghana. He was elected with 6,270 votes out of 14,908 total valid votes cast. This was equivalent to 44.6% of the total valid votes cast. He was elected over Bawah Mamshie Ali of the People's National Convention, Jabanyit K. Lanzari of the Convention People's Party and Abubakar S. Malba of the New Patriotitc Party. These obtained 3,879, 2,504, 965, and 453 votes respectively out of the total valid votes cast. These were equivalent to 27.6%, 17.8%, 6.9% and 3.2% respectively of total valid votes cast.
