= Charles Agyinasare =

Ghanaian pastor

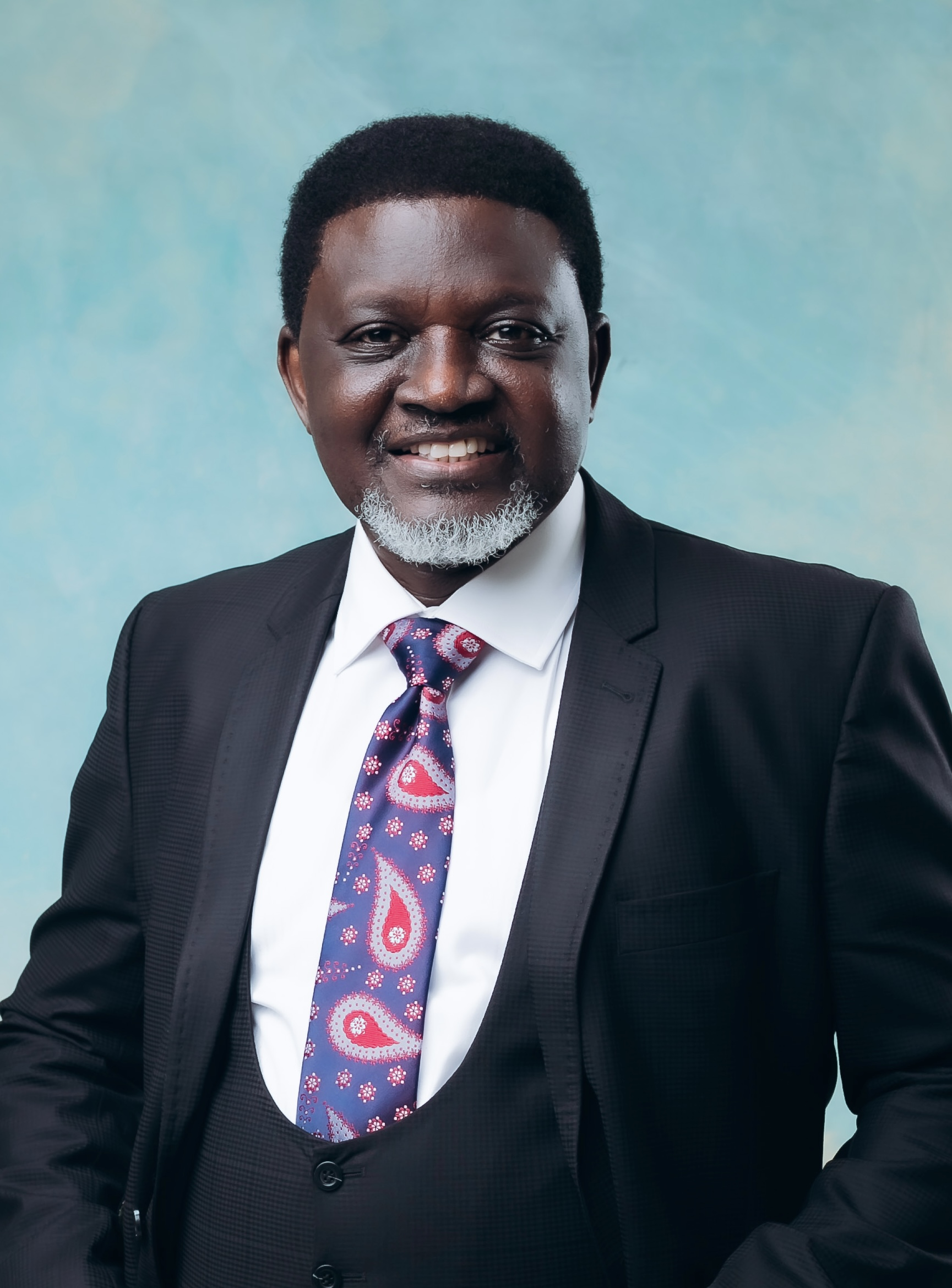
- Title: Archbishop Dr

Personal life
- Born: Charles Yewuraekow Agyin-Asare; March 22, 1962 (age 64) in Achiase, Eastern Region, Ghana
- Spouse: Rev. (Mrs.) Vivian Sena Agyinasare (m. 1985)
- Children: 4, [Bishop Dr Selaise Agyinasare m. Ms Ella Agyinasare, Apostle Francis Agyinasare m. Ms Kathy Araba Agyinasare, Lawyer Charlene Agyinasare m. Rev Elvis Okyere Ampah, Ms. Clementina Tetteh m. Richmond Tetteh]

Religious life
- Religion: Christianity
- Denomination: Pentecostal/ Charismatic
- Church: Perez Chapel International

Archbishop Charles Agyinasare (English pronunciation: / ɑdʒɪnəsɑ:ri /) is a Ghanaian pastor who founded the Word Miracle Church International 1987, later Perez Chapel International, a Pentecostal-Charismatic ministry in Ghana. which has grown into a multinational ministry with over 400 churches in 26 countries. The ministry emphasizes evangelism, discipleship, healing ministry, leadership formation, and social transformation.

He is widely recognized as one of Africa’s foremost Pentecostal and Charismatic leaders, whose ministry has significantly shaped contemporary Christianity in Ghana and beyond. He has distinguished himself as a missionary statesman, evangelist, author, educator, and leadership mentor. Through more than four decades of ministry, he has contributed extensively to evangelism, church growth, leadership development, humanitarian service, and theological scholarship within global Pentecostalism.

Agyinasare entered full-time ministry in 1983 after a dramatic experience of salvation that redirected his life toward Christian service.

Through Agyinasare World Evangelism, Agyinasare has spearheaded large-scale evangelistic campaigns, ministerial conferences, and leadership development initiatives in 96 nations spanning Africa, Europe, Asia, North America, and Latin America His evangelistic ministry has been marked by strong emphasis on divine healing, miracles, revival, and transformational leadership. In recognition of his influence and apostolic leadership within global Christianity, he was elevated to the ecclesiastical office of Archbishop in 2022.

== Early life ==
Charles Yewuraekow Agyin-Asare was born to Andrews Kofi Asare, who served with the Field Engineers Regiment of the Ghana Armed Forces, and Elizabeth Arthur. During her pregnancy, it was customary for Elizabeth Arthur to return to Achiase to give birth because her mother lived there. Consequently, Charles was born in Achiase in the Eastern Region of Ghana on March 22, 1962. Three months after his birth, his mother returned with him to Accra, Weija Barracks, where he spent much of his childhood and early years. He is a past pulpil of Weija Barracks Primary and Armed Forces Experimental School and student of St. Martins Secondary School. There, he was a “women-chasing freak” who got caught up in what he calls “sin, revelry, alcoholism and drug addiction” and “a life of smoking, truancy, chasing girls, using hard drugs, night-clubbing, and stints with various occult associations”. He was later expelled from St. Martins Secondary School . In 1980, at the age of 18 having been a Nichiren Shoshu Buddhist for 4 years Agyinasare attended a service at a branch of the Church of Pentecost after being invited by a young woman he was pursuing. During the service, he encountered salvation and was delivered from his immoral life, and joined the Church of Pentecost.

== Dramatic Encounter ==
In 1983, Charles Agyinasare entered a season of deep desperation that lasted nine months. He wept, prayed, and pleaded with God not to have a powerless ministry. Seeing few miracles in the churches around him, he longed for the power demonstrated in Acts, where, after Peter preached, the people were “pricked in their heart” (Acts 2:37), and where the sick were healed even by Peter’s shadow (Acts 5:15). He sought the compassion and power of Jesus, who “was moved with compassion … and healed their sick” (Matthew 14:14). He prayed, “Lord, break me, melt me, mold me, fill me, and use me.” Days were spent in fasting, nights, in tearful intercession. Like Jacob, he wrestled with God, vowing not to let go until he was blessed .That same year, a Morris Cerullo School of Ministry came to Accra, Ghana which he attended. On September 16, 1983, after Dr. Alex Ness anointed participants, Agyinasare heard an audible voice which he claims is that of the Holy Spirit: “My boy Charles, I send you out as I sent Moses; go, and I will put My words in your lips.”Days later, during fasting and prayer, he heard again: “My boy Charles, I give unto you power over demons and principalities. Heal the sick, raise the dead, and preach the Kingdom.” He asked the voice “Lord, if this is you, give me a Bible verse for this. Immediately he heard Luke 9:1-2 and Luke 8:1. When he flipped his Bible there was the same words he had heard.That divine encounter transformed his life. Without manuals or mentors, he studied Christ’s ministry and the Acts of the Apostles, learning to command healing with faith and authority. It was the turning point—a call to demonstrate the power of the gospel with signs following (Mark 16:20).

== Legal Name Change ==
Born Charles Yewuraekow Agyin-Asare, Charles formally changed his surname to Agyinasare by joining Agyin-Asare together, in 2011 through a statutory declaration executed under Ghanaian law.

== Educational Background ==
He earned a PhD in Business from the Transcontinental Institution of Higher Education, Malta, and an MBA in Human Resource Management from the Tanzania Open University. His theological training includes advanced studies in Practical Theology, culminating in both Master of Theology (MTh) and Doctor of Theology (DTh) degrees from the Christian Life School of Theology Global, Columbus, USA, accredited by the International Association of Bible Colleges and Seminaries (IABCS). He also obtained a Diploma in Charismatic Theology from All Nations for Christ Bible Institute in Nigeria and studied Mass Evangelism Campaign Planning under then Founder and President of the Institution, Archbishop Benson Idahosa. In addition to his formal education, Agyinasare has participated in executive leadership development programs, including the Chief Executives Programme at the Ghana Institute of Management and Public Administration (GIMPA), advanced leadership studies at the Haggai Institute for Advanced Leadership Training in Hawaii, USA and Harvard University Graduate School of Design Executive Education These educational experiences have contributed significantly to his expertise in organizational leadership, ethics, church administration, and transformational governance.

== Institutional Roles and Contributions ==
Agyinasare has founded and supervised several institutions that contribute to spiritual formation, leadership development, higher education, media evangelism, and humanitarian outreach. These institutions include Perez Chapel International, Perez University College, Precious Television, the Agyinasare Leadership Institute, and the Agyinasare Foundation, all of which have played significant roles in Christian ministry, leadership training, educational advancement, and social intervention within Ghana and beyond.

== Perez Chapel International ==
Founded in 1987, Perez Chapel International serves as the flagship ministry under his leadership. The church operates over 400 branches in 26 countries and remains one of the largest charismatic ministries in Ghana and Africa.

== Contribution to Pentecostal/ Charismatic Theology ==
In addition to his evangelistic ministry, Agyinasare has made significant contributions to Christian discipleship through his writings. Among his most notable doctrinal works is Rooted and Built Up in Him: Things Which Make Sound Doctrine, originally published as a single-volume doctrinal manual and later revised and expanded into a four-volume series (the A-Z of Christian Doctrine) titled the New Rooted and Built Up in Him Volume 1: The Scriptures, God & Man; Volume 2: The Christian Life & The Church; Volume 3: The Gospel & the Last Days; and Volume 4: Family Life, Gender & Important Subjects . The work is regarded as one of the earliest comprehensive doctrinal teaching manuals produced in Ghana and has been widely used for discipleship and foundational Christian instruction. Its impact has extended beyond Ghana through translations into Urdu and French, contributing to doctrinal education and spiritual formation within Pentecostal and Charismatic communities across diverse linguistic and cultural contexts. As part of his ministry activities in Pakistan in 2026, Agyinasare facilitated the distribution of 10,000 copies of the Urdu edition of his four-volume doctrinal series, Rooted and Built Up in Him, to pastors and Christian leaders. The initiative formed part of a broader international outreach effort that has been financed by Agyinasare and his ministry partners since 2006. According to ministry reports, his evangelistic, leadership development, and literature distribution initiatives in Pakistan have involved financial investments amounting to hundreds of thousands of U.S. dollars over the years. Agyinasare has described these expenditures as investments in spiritual, leadership, and societal transformation.

Agyinasare's ministry in Pakistan has received recognition from several Christian leaders in the country. Pastor Nasir Paul, who hosted Agyinasare's 2006 evangelistic campaign, stated that Agyinasare was the first black Christian minister to conduct a large-scale open-air evangelistic campaign in Pakistan that attracted thousands of attendees and helped showcase the country's openness to religious engagement. Pastor Asher Mansha, Chairman of Christ Holiness Church and Shine Star TV Network, described Agyinasare as a father figure to many within Pakistan's Christian community and credited his leadership and sacrificial commitment with helping to build a lasting ministry legacy in the nation. Rev Shakeel Bhatti, National Overseer of Perez Chapel International, Pakistan, has commended Agyinasare's commitment to Pakistan and noted that his leadership conferences, including the Gujranwala ministers' conference, have contributed to equipping pastors and Christian leaders for effective ministry and service.

== Precious Television ==
As CEO of Precious Television since 2013, he has expanded Christian media outreach through broadcasting sermons, leadership teachings, worship services, and educational programs to millions of viewers worldwide.

== Agyinasare Leadership Institute ==
Established in 2010, the Agyinasare Leadership Institute focuses on leadership training and mentorship for pastors, professionals, entrepreneurs, and emerging leaders across Ghana, Francophone Africa, and Asia.

== Perez University College and Perez Ministerial College ==
Agyinasare founded Perez University College, a GTEC accredited university college in 2015 and serves as its Chancellor. The institution promotes academic excellence, ethical leadership, and Christian scholarship. He also serves as President of Perez Ministerial College, established in 1992 to train ministers and Christian leaders for ministry service.

== Humanitarian and Social Interventions ==
He oversees Perez Relief and Social Services (PERASOS), which coordinates humanitarian outreach initiatives, including medical assistance, educational support, and disaster relief. Through the Agyinasare Foundation, his family annually provides scholarships for academically brilliant but financially disadvantaged students and supports healthcare interventions for needy individuals. Every year he donates several thousands of his books to Christian Leaders and needy students in various nations of the world.

== National and Ecclesiastical Leadership ==
Agyinasare has played a major role in national Christian leadership and interdenominational cooperation in Ghana.He served for ten years as First Vice President of the Ghana Pentecostal and Charismatic Council (GPCC), contributing significantly to policy development, ministerial ethics, and church-state relations.

He further chaired the GPCC Ethics, Arbitration and Development Committee and served on the National Executive Council, helping strengthen ministerial accountability and ecclesiastical governance within Ghanaian Pentecostalism. He became the President of the Bible Society of Ghana in 2024.

== Board Service and National Engagement ==
Beyond ecclesiastical ministry, Agyinasare has served in educational, financial, and civic leadership capacities. His board appointments include:

- Board of Regents, Central University, Accra (12 years)
- Board of Regents, All Nations University, Koforidua (8 years)
- Board Chairman, FirstTrust Savings and Loans Limited
- National Adviser, Women’s Aglow Fellowship International
- Board Chairman, Aves Academy (since 2022)
- He also serves as Chairman of the Cancer Project Ghana. These roles demonstrate his commitment to ethical leadership, institutional development, and national transformation.

== Awards and Recognition ==
Agyinasare has received numerous national and international honors in recognition of his contributions to ministry, leadership, and social development.These include:

- Member of the Order of the Volta (MV) (Ghana National Award, 2007) by former President of the Republic of Ghana John Agyekum Kufuor, for his outstanding achievements in championing African excellence as a religious leader.
- Senate Resolution No. 841, State of Texas, USA (1999)
- Honorary Citizen and Goodwill Ambassador, City of Houston, USA
- African Servant Leadership Award, Regent University, USA (2015) for his impact across the globe.
- Global Excellence Award, USA (2010)
- Excellence of Distinction Award, Millennium Excellence Foundation (2022)
- President’s Lifetime Achievement Award, USA (2023)

A national survey in 2015 ranked him among the 100 Most Influential Ghanaians and recognized him as one of the most influential pastors on social media platforms in Ghana. He has also received multiple honorary doctorates in Divinity, Theology, and Humanities from institutions in the United Kingdom, India, and the United States. In recognition of his leadership contributions and professional accomplishments, Agyinasare was admitted as a Fellow of the Chartered Institute of Leadership and Governance, Ghana (FCILG).

== Film Adaptation ==
In 2022, as part of the 60th birthday celebrations of Archbishop Dr. Charles Agyinasare, themed A Life and Legacy of Exploits, a biographical film titled I Heard from Heaven: The Incredible Story of Archbishop Charles Agyinasare was produced. The film chronicles his life journey from childhood through his conversion to Christianity, entry into ministry, and eventual emergence as one of Africa's leading Pentecostal and Charismatic church leaders. The production highlights key moments in his early evangelistic ministry and serves as a visual documentation of his life, faith, impact, and legacy. Reports associated with the production have indicated that a second part of the film is anticipated, although it had not yet been released at the time of writing.

== Publications and Intellectual Contributions ==
Agyinasare is a prolific Christian author whose literary contributions span theology, leadership, ethics, marriage, ministry, church growth, family life, and personal development. Ghanaian media reports and official ministry profiles indicate that he has authored more than eighty publications, several of which have been translated into French, Japanese, and Urdu, thereby extending their influence across multiple cultural and linguistic contexts within global Christianity.

Among his most notable publications are Pastoral Protocol: A Guide to Ministerial Ethics, From Small to Medium to Mega: How to Grow Your Church, Terrorists of Leadership: Resisting the Traps of Money Sex and Power, 15 Key Ingredients for Effective Leadership, Till Death Do Us Part, The Joseph Paradigm of Leadership, Arrows: Raising Godly Children, My Boy Charles, Good Manners and Etiquette for Everyday Use, How Anybody Can be Somebody:Success God's Way and Signs, Let's Talk Baby: Communication in Marriage, Wonders and Miracles in Contemporary Christianity Today. These works collectively address ministerial ethics, leadership formation, church administration, marriage and family systems, Pentecostal spirituality, discipleship, organizational development, and contemporary Christian leadership practice.

Independent publishing and bookselling platforms such as Google Books, Amazon, Apple Books, Goodreads, and Thrift Books further demonstrate the circulation and recognition of many of his publications beyond Ghanaian Pentecostal circles. Ministry reports further indicate that some of his books, including Rise Up and Work and Money with a Mission, have been translated into Urdu, while other publications have appeared in French and Japanese editions as part of broader international ministry outreach initiatives.

Beyond popular Christian literature, Agyinasare has also contributed to academic scholarship through peer-reviewed publications in leadership studies, leadership dynamics, servant leadership, Pentecostal ministry, church growth dynamics and systems, healing ministry, healing ministry ethics, ministerial ethics, environmental responsibility, and organizational leadership and systems within contemporary Christianity and Pentecostal-Charismatic contexts. His academic writings demonstrate an emerging integration of Pentecostal praxis with formal scholarly research and contribute to ongoing discussions within African Pentecostal studies, contemporary Christianity, and global leadership scholarship. Some of his academic publications include:

1. Quantitative Leader–Member Dynamics for Church Growth: Perez Chapel Home Cell

2. The Impact of Leadership Dynamics on the Growth and Development of Home Cells

3. Servant-Leadership Influence on Divine Healing Ministration Among Pentecostal Ministers in Ghana

4. Combating Galamsey in Ghana: A Religious Approach

5. Healing Ministry and Ethical Issues Among Pentecostal Ministries in Ghana

These scholarly contributions reflect an emerging integration of Pentecostal praxis with formal academic inquiry, particularly in the areas of leadership studies, ethics, organizational systems, healing ministry, and African Pentecostal theology. These scholarly contributions demonstrate a sustained research interest in leadership ethics, organizational systems, healing ministry, spiritual formation, and Pentecostal leadership praxis within contemporary African Christianity.

== Family Life ==
Agyinasare is married to Reverend Mrs. Vivian Agyinasare, who has served alongside him in ministry leadership, pastoral administration, women’s ministry, and humanitarian outreach within Perez Chapel International. Their marriage is widely regarded within Pentecostal circles as a model of ministerial partnership, family commitment, and shared spiritual leadership. They have four children: Bishop Dr Selaise Agyinasare (married to Ella Agyinasare), Apostle Francis Agyinasare (married to Kathy Araba Agyinasare), Charlene Agyinasare (married to Rev Elvis Okyere Ampah), and Clementina Tetteh (married to Dr Richmond Tetteh). They also have six grandchildren and continue to play active roles in ministry, leadership development, humanitarian outreach, and philanthropic initiatives connected to the broader vision of Perez Chapel International and its affiliated institutions.
