= Ketu South (Ghana parliament constituency) =

Constituency in Ghana

- constituency for the Parliament of Ghana
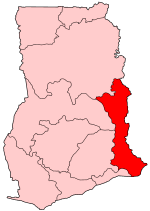
- District: Ketu District
- Region: Volta Region of Ghana

Current constituency
- Created: 1992
- Party: National Democratic Congress
- MP: Dzifa Gomashie

Ketu South is one of the constituencies represented in the Parliament of Ghana. It elects one Member of Parliament (MP) by the first past the post system of election. Ketu South is located in the Ketu district of the Volta Region of Ghana.

== Boundaries ==
The constituency is located within the Ketu South Municipal of the Volta Region of Ghana. Its North Eastern border is shared with the Republic of Togo. Ketu North constituency is located to the North West. To the South East is the Atlantic Ocean. The South Western neighbour of this constituency is the Keta District.

== Members of Parliament ==
Election	Member	Party
1992	Wisdom Tsidore Seyena-Susu	National Democratic Congress
1996	Charles Kofi Agbenaza	National Democratic Congress
2004	Albert Kwasi Zigah	National Democratic Congress
2012	Fiifi Fiavi Kwetey	National Democratic Congress
2020	Dzifa Gomashie	National Democratic Congress

== Elections ==
2024 Ghanaian general election: Ketu South
Party	Candidate	Votes	%	±%
NDC	Abla Dzifa Gomashie	78,902	92.90	+8.76
NPP	Samuel Wisdom Doe Haligah	6,033	7.10	−7.71
Majority		72,869	85.80	+16.47
Turnout		85,806	—	—
Registered electors		—		

2020 Ghanaian general election: Ketu South
Party	Candidate	Votes	%	±%
NDC	Abla Dzifa Gomashie	84,664	84.14	+18.67
NPP	David Tiano Quarshie	14,904	14.81	+9.24
Ghana Union Movement	Henyo Dometor	836	0.83	—
Liberal Party of Ghana	Holy Kingsford Amegah	213	0.21	
Majority		69,760	69.33	+28.91
Turnout			—	—
Registered electors		—		

2016 Ghanaian parliamentary election: Ketu South
Party	Candidate	Votes	%	±%
National Democratic Congress	Fifi Fiavi Franklin Kwetey	48,723	65.47	−23.45
Independent	Jim Yao Morti	18,643	25.05	—
New Patriotic Party	Maxwell Koffie Lugudor	4,148	5.57	+0.86
Independent	Albert Kwasi Zigah	2,545	3.42	−1.1
National Democratic Party	Azumah Courage Kwame Mensah	191	0.26	+0.1
Convention People's Party	Prince Eli Agbeli	165	0.22	+0.05
Majority		30,080	40.42	−43.79
Turnout		75,807	53.49	−16.87
Registered electors		141,698		

87534

2012 Ghanaian parliamentary election: Ketu South
Party	Candidate	Votes	%	±%
National Democratic Congress	Fiifi Fiavi Kwetey	77,837	88.92	−0.78
New Patriotic Party	Godwin Yayra Nkuawu	4,122	4.71	−0.89
Independent	Albert Kwasi Zigah	3,956	4.52	—
Independent	Edmund Delali Amegatse	660	0.75	—
Progressive People's Party	Mcmayee Davison	373	0.43	—
Convention People's Party	Pascal Kumaza	299	0.34	−1.76
Yes People's Party	Azumah Courage Kwame Mensah	145	0.17	—
National Democratic Party	Avulekpor Samuel	142	0.16	—
Majority		73,715	84.21	+0.11
Turnout		89,123	70.36	+7.46
Registered electors		126,659		

2008 Ghanaian parliamentary election: Ketu South
Party	Candidate	Votes	%	±%
National Democratic Congress	Albert Kwasi Zigah	54,720	89.7	−0.78
New Patriotic Party	Kodjo Peterson Miida Dje	3,446	5.6	+6.5
Convention People's Party	Pascal Kwabla Kumaza	1,287	2.1	+0.9
People's National Convention	Emmanuel Freeman Azinogo	1,142	1.9	+1.6
Democratic Freedom Party	Godwin Tay	416	0.7	—
Democratic People's Party	Ablorh Daniel	0	0	—
Majority		51,274	84.1	+38.7
Turnout		61,810	62.9	+7.46
Registered electors		92,283		

2004 Ghanaian parliamentary election: Ketu South
Party	Candidate	Votes	%	±%
National Democratic Congress	Albert Kwasi Zigah	48,279	68.4	−17.7
Independent	Charles Nypson Agbagedy	16,241	23.0	—
New Patriotic Party	Thomas Frank Seshie	4,809	6.8	−0.9
Convention People's Party	Ms. Vinolia Enyonam Deku	839	1.2	−2.8
People's National Convention	David Adibo-Oboro	238	0.3	—
Every Ghanaian Living Everywhere	Ms. Leticia Edzorna Kalitsi	158	0.2	—
Majority		32,036	45.4	33.0
Turnout		71,481	88.0	−25.1
Registered electors		81,186		

2000 Ghanaian parliamentary election: Ketu South
Party	Candidate	Votes	%	±%
National Democratic Congress	Charles Kofi Agbenaza	39,169	86.1	—
New Patriotic Party	Thomas K. F. Seshie	3,486	7.7	—
Convention People's Party	Christian Yao Zigah	1,810	4.0	—
National Reform Party	Serlorm A. O. Henyo	780	1.7	—
United Ghana Movement	Godwin Tay	248	0.5	—
Majority		35,683	78.4	—
Turnout		75,807	53.49	
Registered electors		141,698		

== See also ==
- List of Ghana Parliament constituencies
