= Saboba =

Saboba Bikpakando for cities whose native name is not in English --> Chaboba
- Dispersed District Capital
- Motto: Saboba
- Location of Saboba in Northern region
- Coordinates: 9°43′3″N 0°19′20″W
- Country: Ghana
- Region: Northern Region
- District: Saboba District
- Elevation: 371 ft (113 m)

Population (2013)
  - Total: —
- Time zone: GMT
  - Summer (DST): GMT

Saboba is a small town and is the capital of Saboba district, a district in the Northern Region of north Ghana. The primary economic activity is farming. Tribes like kokombas, kotokoli, chakosi and dagombas can be found in this district. Currently, Joseph Nikpe Bukari is the member of Parliament for Saboba and its neighbouring villages.
