= List of Non-Summit episodes (2015) =

- No. of episodes: 52

Release
- Original network: JTBC
- Original release: January 5 – December 28, 2015

Season chronology
- ← Previous; 2014 Next → 2016

Non-Summit (비정상회담) is a South Korean talk-variety show, part of JTBC's Monday night lineup. The show aired from July 7, 2014 to December 4, 2017.

== Episodes ==
The show began with eleven foreign men cast as "Representatives" and three South Korean hosts. "Visiting interns" were incorporated into the cast, as regular members took vacations, and some left the show. The debate topics are presented by visiting South Korean guests.

No. in season	Title	Original release date	Rating
27	"I'm All About Saving The Earth"	January 5, 2015	N/A
The first Korean representative for 2015 was hip hop artist Noh Seung-hwan (Sean Noh), of Jinusean who is married and has four children with actress Jung Hye-young. The topic was plans for the year, contributing to society and making a better world, by contributing donations, volunteering, or other good deeds. The intern was Sujan Shakya from Kathmandu, Nepal who is studying urban planning.
28	"I'm Scared That My Child Will Fall Behind in School"	January 12, 2015	N/A
The weekly guest was JTBC news reporter Kim Kwan and the topic was education and private schooling. Three previous visiting intern representatives, Ilya Belyakov, Blair Williams, and Sujan Shakya, became part of the regular cast of "foreign representatives" along with the remaining nine members.
29	"I Get Angry at Small Things"	January 19, 2015	N/A
The weekly guest was actor Park Chul-min and the topic was anger and rage and how to deal with it.
30	"I Believe Those Who Have Connections And Money Are at an Advantage"	January 26, 2015	N/A
Former Korean Basketball League player Seo Jang-hoon was the week's guest and the topic was noblesse oblige, and he said the year he retired he donated his annual salary. During talks, Quintart, said the recent nut rage incident couldn't happen in Belgium, because Belgians are not afraid of money and power. And Rasch said that many in the U.S. accepted it as a personal problem rather than as a social issue.
31	"I Don't Want My Daughter To Study Abroad"	February 2, 2015	N/A
South Korean lawyer and graduate of Harvard Law School, Kang Yong-suk presented the topic of study abroad and immigration, and discoursed with Tyler Rasch in English. For the fun part of the show, Blair Williams performed K-pop girl group Orange Caramel's "Catallena" dance.
32	"I Can't Lie"	February 9, 2015	N/A
The guest was Kangnam of the hip hop group MIB and the topic was lies and rumors. Kangnam and Takuya Terada, both being from Japan, and in South Korean singing/dance groups, had a face-off about who was better looking and popular. For two "lying" skits, hidden cameras recorded Daniel Lindemann telling members he was really from Austria, not Germany, and asked them to keep it a secret. In the second skit, Jullian Quintart tells members he is in desperate need of money.
33	"I Don't Want To Travel with My Family"	February 16, 2015	N/A
The weekly guest was prior foreign representative James Hooper who shared what he has been doing since he left for his Australian studies, with his family, after Episode 4. The show has a discussion on which are the worst and best tourists from various countries.
34	"I Don't Prepare For Life After Retirement"	February 23, 2015	N/A
Actor Kim Kwang-kyu was the guest and discussed retirement plans, questioning whether one is better prepared if living single or married.
35	"I Have To Buy The Hottest Items"	March 2, 2015	N/A
Singer songwriter Moon Hee-joon of prior boyband HOT was the guest, and presented the topic; whether following fashion trends is a waste of time, or it's better to just be happy with what you wear. Belyakov, Patry and Williams were assigned to choose a date look, and Belyakov admitted he could not give up his bell-bottoms.
36	"I'm An Adult And I'm Stuck in Adolescence"	March 9, 2015	N/A
Yoon Do-hyun, leader of rock YB, was the guest and presented the topic of midlife crisis. In talks about vending machines in different countries, Rasch shared information on the cannabis or marijuana vending machine in the U.S. Results of the show's website voting competition for the "most handsome" on the show were given, with 1–3 going to Lindemann, Zhang, and Terada; and last going to host Moo.
37	"I Don't Waste A Penny Because I Want To Be Rich"	March 16, 2015	N/A
StarCraft pro-gamer Hong Jin-ho and singer Kang Kyun-sung were guests and discussed dreams of being rich and the efforts they have put into it.
38	"I Want To Get Rid of TV"	March 23, 2015	N/A
Singer and television personality Jo Young-nam presented the topic of television. He said that when he started his career in 1968, Tom Jones was on TV singing Delilah. They discussed whether it might be better to not watch any television, and the "absurd" programs in their different countries.
39	"I Don't Want To Go To School"	March 30, 2015	N/A
Actress Kim So-yeon, the first female guest in four months, caused a jealous reaction from the other cast when she chose Zhang as her ideal type. The topic of discussion was the new academic term and how to prepare for it. The foreign representatives gave sympathetic advice.
40	"Good Restaurants Around The World"	April 6, 2015	N/A
Singer songwriter Kim Tae-woo brought the topic food and eating and discussed his love of meat and some of his favorite foods.
41	"I'm Losing My Conscience"	April 13, 2015	N/A
Singer Baek Ji-young was the guest and the discussion was conscience and morality. Baek sang a duet with Belyakov, who confessed to being a big fan of hers. Patry attempted to sing with her, and host Sung complimented his efforts.
42	"Lookism Is Making Me Unhappy"	April 20, 2015	N/A
Comedian Kim Jun-hyun presented the topic of lookism, and having majored in philosophy, debated seriously. He also shared a picture of himself younger and thinner.
43	"I Want My Child To Get Special Education for the Gifted Children"	April 27, 2015	N/A
The show starts with a special note of sadness for the April 2015 Nepal earthquake and Shakya's home country of Nepal where he and other cast just visited, a couple of weeks ago, for filming episodes of Where Is My Friend's Home. South Korean film director, theatre director, et al, Jang Jin was the guest and presented the discussion of gifted education for gifted persons. He argued for bringing up the gifted child as a normal person, expressing concern about their happiness. Rasch argued that it's totally normal for parents to want to develop the gifted child's skills, to develop their opportunities. Yoo, Patry and Rasch have an intellectual "showdown" with Patry winning.
44	"I Still Don't Know What I Want To Be"	May 4, 2015	N/A
Manhwa artist, Huh Young-man presented the topic of jobs and shared his life's story. In discussions presented by an elementary school student worries that he had not found his dream yet, members debate whether a job choice should be decided in early life, or later. Everyone draws someone else at the meeting, and they guess who the drawing is of; with Young-man praising Patry's drawing of Hyun-moo, but selecting Rasch's drawing of himself as the best.
45	"I Want To Give Up on Buying A Home"	May 11, 2015	N/A
Comedians Song Eun-i and Kim Sook discussed whether to buy a home or just continue renting. Representative Belyakov said renting was a waste of money, it's best to invest in a house, but Rasch said it's a big debt burden and discouraged it. Terada was absent for the show due to scheduling conflicts.
46	"I Hate Hatred"	May 18, 2015	N/A
Educator, author and prominent South Korean cultural critic Chin Jung-kwon presented the topic of hate speech and hate crime, or hate propaganda, and also discoursed with Lindemann in German.
47	"I Think There Are No True Leaders in Our Society"	May 25, 2015	N/A
The guests were boy group Shinee's Onew and Choi Min-ho for a discussion on leadership. Summit leader Jun, and representatives Deiana, Okyere and Terada join them for a dance performance of their title song from Sherlock. For a leadership experiment, Blair Williams replaces Yoo as the show's Secretary General, and Patry and Zhang replace the other two Chairmen, Jun and Sung.
48	"I Want To Make People Laugh All The Time"	June 1, 2015	N/A
Comedian Kim Young-chul brought jokes and laughter to the show, discussing how important he thinks happiness is, but said "We need to think of the timing and venue. There is no need for a person to find it a must to make me happy when I feel sad." Deiana's French mother and Italian father were also guests on the show. Quintart was absent from the show, and Yoo led the cast in the "faux" cheering to celebrate.
49	"I Feel Like I'm at a Loss By Obeying The Law"	June 8, 2015	N/A
The guest, Robert Holley, a lawyer and television personality, who was born in the U.S. and became a Korean citizen in 1997, brought the discussion on law and abiding by it, or not. A photo of his younger looks were compared to Quintart. Shakya was absent due to relief activities related to Nepal's recent earthquakes.
50	"I'm A Middle Aged Person Who Likes K-Pop Idol Groups"	June 15, 2015	N/A
Actor Jo Min-ki opened the discussion on the value of age and his continuing to like girl K-pop groups in his middle-age. The show had a mock "emo" or sensitive Superstar K with Williams singing Roy Kim's "Spring Spring Spring", Lindemann singing J.Y. Park's "You're the One", and Rasch singing Cho Yong-pil's "I Hope It Would Be That Way Now".
51	"I Am Worried World War III Might Break Out"	June 22, 2015	N/A
Current affairs cultural critic, scholar and university professor, Chin Jung-kwon presented the topic of war and peace. Lindemann and members discussed the reunification of Germany and thoughts about Korea's own division.
52	"One Year Anniversary Highlights"	June 29, 2015	N/A
The show's one-year anniversary retrospective was a farewell for six representatives, three who had been on the show from the beginning episode, Quintart, Deiana and Terada; and three interns who were added to the show in January 2015, Belyakov, Shakya and Williams.
53	"I Think Korea Is A Bad Country To Live In"	July 6, 2015	N/A
Boyband ZE:A's Hwang Kwanghee was the guest and started the discussion about whether South Korea is a good country to live in, with recent problems like MERS and large accidents occurring; and what makes a country a good place to live. The episode introduced the six new members, Poland's Przemysław Krompiec, Brazil's Carlos Gorito, Norway's Nikolai Johnsen, Greece's Andreas Varsakopoulos, Egypt's Samy Rashad(El-Baz) (prior intern on Episode 11) and Japan's Yuta Nakamoto. Some contests pitted older members against the new – soccer skills, arm wrestling and dancing.
54	"I Am Still Overreacting to MERS"	July 13, 2015	N/A
Actress Hwang Seok-jeong introduced the topic, the MERS crisis in Korea.
55	"I Am The Incarnation of Desire"	July 20, 2015	N/A
Representatives started the discussion on the week's topic desire, before actor guests Im Won-hee and Son Ho-jun arrived, with mythological stories from their countries, Varsakopoulos's Pasiphaë, Johnsen's Freyja and Patry's Sedna. The show includes the desire or passion for a FIFA soccer win and a contest between competitors Germany (Lindemann) and Brazil (Gorito) with help from Zhang and Varsakopoulos.
56	"I Always Try To Fit Myself into Someone Else's Standards"	July 27, 2015	N/A
Actor and television host Lee Hoon presented the topic of trying to find the right answer. Patry mistook him for the Iris actor Lee Byung-hun and Varsakopoulos beat him at arm wrestling. Rasch was absent for this show.
57	"I Think There Is No Hope for the Economy"	August 3, 2015	N/A
Internet economic lecturer and author Choi Jin-ki presented the topic on the world economy's status and the Greek financial crisis, in particular.
58	"I Think Science Will Eventually Destroy The Human Race"	August 10, 2015	N/A
Joon Park, Korean-American singer, and leader of pop group g.o.d, was the guest and talked about the dangers of the development of science and technology. He said it seems like the science of the old TV drama, The Six Million Dollar Man has arrived, and remembered playing with toy Walkie-talkies before cellphones.
59	"I Believe There Are Separate Gender Roles For Men And Women"	August 17, 2015	N/A
Television presenter, actress, et al. Hong Jin-kyung was the guest and discussed her belief that there are different gender roles for men and women. Rashad El-Baz said that in the conservative culture of Egypt, women previously couldn't leave home without their husband's permission. Patry said he was aware of gender roles as a child, realizing that even different colors were meant for boys or girls.
60	"I Think Society Is Resisting Multiculturalism"	August 24, 2015	N/A
Comedian, entertainer Jeong Jun-ha presented the topic of whether society is accepting multiculturalism. The week's fun, prior to the serious debate, included comparing the representative's looks to cartoons and people (ie. Rashad El-Baz to Teletubbie Dipsy and Johnsen to actor Ryu Soo-young), a Taekwondo exhibit by Lindemann and Johnsen, and an eating contest with guest Jung beating Patry.
61	"I Can't Make Decisions on My Own"	August 31, 2015	N/A
Comedian Jang Do-yeon presented the topic of decision-making and her inability to make decisions. The discussion included Johnsen's noting that indecision on small things makes it harder to decide on more important things and Rasch stating that receiving advice from others about decisions has flexibility and compromise.
62	"I Think The Country's Development Is Determined by the National Psyche"	September 7, 2015	N/A
Comedian and singer Heo Kyung-hwan performed his new song "Namja" (Man) with singer Sei for the cast, and introduced the discussion of the national psyche and its effects on a country's development.
63	"I Don't Try To Protect The Environment"	September 14, 2015	N/A
Wonder Girls Yenny and Hyelim were guests for a discussion about environmental protection, admitting they felt they don't do enough in actual practice. Hyelim, who lived in Hong Kong for 14 years and also studied English, spoke Cantonese with Zhang and English with Patry, with Patry making a grammatical error that caused laughs.
64	"I Want To Get A Job Instead of Going To College"	September 21, 2015	N/A
Rapper and MC Beenzino discussed his rebellion against a formal education and his father slapping him when he refused to go to college. He judged a "rap battle" and chose Okyere the best over Zhang and Rashad El-Baz, then performed his rap from his 2015 song "So What". Also on the show, Zhang discussed Chinese fashion and said China was the first to have see-through clothing.
65	"Global Culture Contest"	September 28, 2015	N/A
The Chuseok Special, was the first outdoor filming for the show, at a traditional hanok house in Gyeonggi Province with the cast dressed in holiday hanbok and celebrating with traditional games and foods of the world. Mondi and Rasch were absent.
66	"There Certainly Is Bad Relationship Between People"	October 5, 2015	N/A
This episode started introducing new interns from more countries, with Thailand's Tachara Longprasert being the first. The former television announcer, graduate of Chulalongkorn University, and current graduate student in international business at Sogang University, competed in an "announcers" contest with Jun and Zhang and discussed events in his country. Just prior to this show, cast members met with fans on South Korea's Naver V-app for the first time, with Patry, Mondi, Zhang and Lindemann introducing the week's intern. The South Korean guest, comedian Park Mi-sun, presented the weekly topic of ill-fated relationships.
67	"Lack of Creativity"	October 12, 2015	N/A
Poet, singer-songwriter Ha Sang-wook was the weekly guest and discussed creativity, including talks about some recent plagiarism controversies, and the cast sharing their own creative efforts. The visiting intern, 35-year-old Mark Ancliff from Nottingham, England, met his future South Korean wife while studying for a PhD in physics at the University of Warwick. He moved to South Korea with her 8 years ago, and they now have two children, and he is an assistant professor of physics at Catholic University of Korea.
68	"I Don't Want To Eat Breakfast"	October 19, 2015	N/A
The week's visiting intern was Mexico City's 23-year-old Christian Burgos, who has been studying in South Korea for 2 years and enjoys taekwondo. He shared a dance and stories of his country. The guest was chef Sam Kim from JTBC's Please Take Care of My Refrigerator and the debate was over the importance of having a nutritious breakfast to start the day.
69	"Miscommunication Between Men And Women"	October 26, 2015	N/A
The intern was Spain's Gabriel Ruíz, a 22-year-old industrial engineering student at Seoul National University, who debated with Mondi, "Spanish people are often biased against Italian people." Singers Jo Jung-chi and Jung-in, a prior couple on We Got Married, presented the topic of the different communication skills and misunderstandings between men and women. Patry was absent for this episode.
70	"Raising A Daughter in a Restless And Brutal World"	November 2, 2015	N/A
The visiting intern was Yaser Khalifa, a Korea University MBA Public Relations and Communications student from Saudi Arabia Guest Pyo Chang-won presented the topic, the world without crime.
71	"A Person From A Poor Family Can Never Become Rich"	November 9, 2015	N/A
The visiting intern was 32-year-old Bhushan Kumar, from India. The topic was social polarization and "the gulf between rich and poor" presented by singer/songwriter Hwang Chi-yeul, who said he first moved to Seoul with the approximate of 200 (USD) in his pocket.
72	"I Feel Uncomfortable With All this Attention"	November 16, 2015	N/A
The visiting intern from the Netherlands was 26-year-old Sander Roomer, a marketing and advertising worker, who studied Korean language at Yonsei University. Guest Eun Ji-won introduced the topic of personal privacy and privacy law, after having an "intelligence quiz" with Patry.
73	"I Focus More on My Part-Time Job Than on Search For Full-Time Employment"	November 23, 2015	N/A
The intern was 28-year-old Francisco Antonio Bompart from Venezuela who has lived in Korea for 6 years, studied industrial engineering at Ajou University, and works in the field. In a discussion of his country, he talked about the beautiful women. Guest, F.T. Island lead singer and actor Lee Hong-gi talked about his various part-time jobs during his schooling, to make money. The cast asked him about his relationship with actress Park Shin-hye, and he said they are just friends who spend time together.
74	"I Even Get into Debt To Show Off"	November 30, 2015	N/A
Prior to the show, cast members held a second live meeting with fans, via the V-app with Yoo, Patry, Zhang, Krompiec introducing the week's intern. The week's intern was 28-year-old Bok Wisalbot from Cambodia who spoke about his country, including the history of the Killing Fields. Comedian guest Park Narae presented the topic, boasting and showing off.
75	"I Don't Think Korea Is Safe From Terrorism"	December 7, 2015	N/A
The intern was 30-year-old Austrian Matthias Grabner, a translator and manager at a media company who is married and has lived in South Korea for 7 years. The guests were Jin Joong-gwon, cultural critic and professor at Dongyang University, and former representative Robin Deiana, who discussed the war on terror, in particular the November 2015 Paris attacks, in Deiana's home country.
76	"I'm Obsessed With Making A Good Impression"	December 14, 2015	N/A
The intern, 27-year-old Chung-Ang University doctoral student Akeem Pedro, from South Africa made representative Okyere a little nervous, told about his country and did a B-boying performance. Guest, actor Woo Hyeon presented the topic, the importance of making a good first impression.
77	"I Only LIke Famous Music By Legendary Artists"	December 21, 2015	N/A
The intern was Bulgarian Mihal Ashminov, a cast member and chef of another JTBC show Please Take Care of My Refrigerator. The guest, singer and radio presenter, Bae Cheol-soo discussed legendary music, including the Swedish group ABBA of the 1970s and 1980s and their hit song "Dancing Queen".
78	"Top Global Issues of 2015"	December 28, 2015	N/A
The week's intern was 34-year-old Mauricio Loayza from Bolivia. The guest was actor Jung Sang-hoon and the discussion was about the most important global issues of the year. This was the last appearance for Japanese representative Nakamoto, who announced he was leaving to prepare for his debut as a singer.
