= List of Non-Summit episodes (2017) =

- No. of episodes: 47

Release
- Original network: JTBC
- Original release: January 9 – December 4, 2017

Season chronology
- ← Previous; 2016 Next → Season 2018

Non-Summit (Korean: 비정상회담) is a South Korean talk-variety show, part of JTBC's Monday night lineup. The show aired from July 7, 2014 to December 4, 2017.

== Episodes ==
The show began with eleven foreign men cast as "Representatives" and three South Korean hosts. "Visiting interns" were incorporated into the cast, as regular members took vacations, and some left the show. The debate topics are presented by visiting South Korean guests.

No. in season	Title	Original release date	Rating
131	"What Are The Global Issues in 2017?"	January 9, 2017	N/A
The discussion on world trends of 2017 was delayed from airing the prior week, and included guest writer Cho Seung-yeon who previously appeared on Episode 111. The three hosts, along with representatives Wang (China), Loubert (France), Lucky (India), Mondi (Italy), Ogi (Japan) and Tetto (US) were joined by prior representative Nikolai Johnsen (Norway – Korea University Koreanology student), prior intern from Episode 95 Muhamad Khalid Bin Ismail (Malaysia – business owner, in South Korea for ten years); and new interns – Anita Emefa Hato (Ghana, (Nogokpo, Agbozume) – Ewha Womans University Education Technology graduate student), Olga (Russia – Seoul National University International Affairs master's graduate), Jeren (Turkey – Sungkyunkwan University Korean language exchange student), and Tristan (United Kingdom – graduate student and former employee at the Foreign and Commonwealth Office). Cho cited the behavior of Brexit and Donald Trump supporters, arguing a trending from a "left" or "right" ideological conflict towards a question of an open door policy as opposed to a "closed door policy". Tetto brought up current U.S. popular phrases populism, nationalism and protectionism. Discussion also included the European Union (membership, Accession of Turkey to the European Union and Languages of the European Union), and International reactions to the 2016 United States presidential election (fall of the Malaysian ringgit, Trump's phone call with Tsai Ing-wen and One-China policy and Chimerica). Contentious issues included – Sphere of influence, One Belt, One Road, Russia–Turkey relations (2015 Russian Sukhoi Su-24 shootdown, Assassination of Andrei Karlov), Kuril Islands dispute; and other talks included employment and Asian pollution problems and hopes for 2017.
132	"I Think Having A Long And Stable Career Is Better Than Rising To Fame Quickly"	January 16, 2017	N/A
The show's first two talks covered Interpol arrests of international fugitives and ambulance costs. The week's intern, Mongolia's Surmen Sangsuuren, a senior at Korea University joined the main talk of late bloomers presented by the guest, actor and cast member of Saturday Night Live Korea, Kim Min-kyo. Kim's career blossomed after twenty years, mostly with his reputation for parodies, including a recent one of Choi Soon-sil. He said he enjoyed his early days acting in plays, when he earned enough money to buy soju for his fellow actors, and never dreamed of being a big celebrity. He recounted his role in A Little Monk which took so long to film that the child actor in it moved from kindergarten into middle school; and added that as he had shaved his head for the role, it did not give him lasting recognition with the public, after his hair grew back out.
133	"I Trust People Too Easily"	January 23, 2017	N/A
The first two talks were on Barack Obama's farewell address and policies pertaining to opting out of mandatory organ donation. The guest was television personality and Koyote member Kim Jong-min. His topic was his trust of people and how he had been scammed in business relationships due to it. Discussion included Japan's Toyota Shoji swindle, the film Catch Me If You Can, and real-life con men – India's Natwarlal who sold the Taj Mahal, and George C. Parker who sold the Brooklyn Bridge and Statue of Liberty. Cast talked about which world landmarks they would like to buy, including the Golden Gate Bridge, Moai statues, Potala Palace, Salar de Uyuni and Mont Blanc. Absurd fraud cases included rumors of a chow chow/panda and a fox man.
134	"I Can Only Be at Peace When There Is A Fixed Plan"	January 30, 2017	N/A
The show started with a celebration of the Lunar New Year. Cast played the "Arirang" on traditional Korean instruments – Tetto (geomungo), Mazzucchelli (gayageum) and Burgos (haegeum). Wang shared Spring Festival Northern Chinese dumplings with hidden jujubes for a special blessing. Broadcaster and comedian Kim Yong-man presented the main topic of liking well-made plans and package tours vs. spontaneous tours. Tour spots discussed included those made popular by the recent K-drama Guardian: The Lonely and Great God, the Château Frontenac and a Gangneung beach; Japan's anime and spirit tours, and France's Cap d'Agde nude beach. Cast members Wang, Klabunde and Burgos shared memories of a Jeju Island trip they took together and how they had differed over Wang's structured agenda vs. a more relaxing trip favored by the other two. The episode ended with the show's third out-door filming, a tour led by Wang who met Klabunde, Burgos and Ogi at Seoul's Gyeongbokgung Station for the following tour: lunch at Tongin Market, changing the guard at Deoksugung, shopping at the Dongmyo Station flea market, art at Ihwa Mural Village and a sunset view from Naksan Park.
135	"I Like To Eat What I Want, However Much I Want"	February 6, 2017	N/A
The show started with discussion of their new studio set and some new year's changes for cast, including Wang's resolution to drop his K-drama watching to study harder to make up a failed test. The "global side dish" topic was each country's image, reset or turning point from past to present. Talks included France's "broken social ladder" and decline after the Glorious Thirty and government corruption in Mexico. Guests were Red Velvet's Seulgi and Wendy who talked about stress over weight control, dieting and favorite foods. Seulgi's irresistible food is a spicy one and Wendy's is rice cake. Cast shared high calorie foods: France's macaron, Switzerland's cheese fondue, Pakistan's mithai, China's mooncakes, Japan's ramen, Italy's calzone, and Canada's poutine. Other talk included Mexico's blood type diet and Italy's ice cream diet.
136	"I Think Magic And Supernatural Powers Are Fake"	February 13, 2017	N/A
The weekly intern, Iran's Mohsen Shafiee, who previously appeared on Episode 96, joined the first talk on Trump's travel ban. As a representative of one of the seven Muslim countries affected by it, he challenged US representative Tetto to debate. Talks also included the Mexico/US border wall and its effects on Mexico's sovereignty. The guest was illusionist Lee Eun-gyeol for a discussion of magic or illusion and supernatural powers. Lee said illusion performances have been unveiled as fabrications. He shared some coin illusions with the cast, and an anecdote of one of his performances that went badly, when his parrot bit his lip instead of kissing him. Discussions included famous magicians Harry Houdini and David Copperfield, and whether science can explain all supernatural phenomenon. Lee concluded by saying that magic comes from people's desires to achieve what they dream.
137	"I Always Think About The Best Of Every Situation"	February 20, 2017	N/A
The first talk among representatives was the 2017 French presidential election candidate's wives and what information the public has a right to know about a presidential family. Discussion included François Fillon's wife whom he hired as an aide, and Emmanuel Macron's much older wife which ignited rumors of whether he was secretly gay; and roles and responsibilities of First Lady or "First Gentlemen", such as Melania Trump, Peng Liyuan, the non-involved Joachim Sauer and the highly involved Akie Abe. The guest was celebrity hairdresser Cha Hong who discussed her optimistic outlook and her profession, which included training years when she would shampoo as many as 70 heads a day. She appraised the representatives hairstyles and discussion included unique hairstyles of the world. She debated with the show's known pessimist Klabunde who folded by sharing a positive story about Albert Einstein's school day struggles to his rise as "genius".
138	"I Want To Go Back to My School Days"	February 27, 2017	N/A
The week's intern was Malaysia's Thamil Selvan, a Korean language student at Seoul National University, for a discussion of the assassination of Kim Jong-nam in his country, and the nation's response to it. Tetto brought up the assassination attempts on Fidel Castro and other talks included crimes committed abroad and which country had the right to prosecute, the home country of the perpetrator or the foreign one. Guests were Block B members Park Kyung and Lee Tae-il with the topic of longing for their school days. Park said he was living well now, but would study business if could return to school. Tae-il said, as a singer, he spent his school days in the practice room, and wishes he could return to spend time and take pictures with his friends. Other discussion included school uniforms, with Patry proposing possible sex discrimation (skirts for girls, pants for boys) and Lucky saying they bridged the gap between rich and poor students. Park spoke about the free meal service which some students were too embarrassed to use.
139	"I Believe Platonic Love Is Possible"	March 6, 2017	N/A
The cast first discussed the current employment season and some top jobs. The second topic was whistleblowers and the level of punishment they should receive, as presented by Tetto's discussion of Chelsea Manning and her sentence commutation. Talks included Ko Young-tae and whistleblowers in the Choi Soon-sil case, Edward Snowden's case, and whether more severe punishments would hinder reports of crimes. The guest was actress Yoon Jin-seo with the topic of the possibility of platonic love. She talked about her role in the film Coffee Mate, portraying a married woman who has such a relationship with a man she meets. Representatives Loubert and Mondi acted out scenarios with her, trying to appeal to her in a first time meeting. Talks included "spiritual love" relationships and examples from each country, such as celebrity ones like Leonardo DiCaprio and Kate Winslet; and absurd ones, such as a woman in India who married a snake.
140	"I'm Uncomfortable With Forcing The Globalization of Korean Food"	March 13, 2017	N/A
The first talk was a discussion of the 89th Academy Awards's mix-up when the wrong winner was announced, the firing of the employee responsible, and an anecdote of host Jun's having once made a similar mistake. Talk included whether winners at the Oscars and other awards programs should make political speeches. The guest was food columnist Hwang Kyo-ik with the topic of the globalization of Korean food and government involvement in it' promotion. Representatives spoke about some of their countries' foods that had been globalized, and which restaurants they found in South Korea that were similar to foods they liked back home. Korean adaptions of foreign foods included dipping gorgonzola pizza in honey, which Mondi found unusual; and the development of gimbap, which originated in Japan.
141	"In The Era Of Smart Devices, I Dream And Idealize Of Living in Harmony With Nature And Prefer Not To Use Smart Devices."	March 20, 2017	N/A
Tetto and Mazzucchelli were absent for the entire show; Wang was absent for the first half, due to the sensitive nature of the second talk for him as a Chinese representative, as the hosts explained. The two interns were Alejandro Sanchez Sanabria a Spanish instructor from Spain's Canary Islands who talked about his home's similarity to Jeju Island and Chris Johnson from San Jose, California who discussed Silicon Valley in fluent Korean, having lived in South Korea for seven years. The first talk was the impeachment of Park Geun-hye and each countries' reactions to it. Ogi said it was reported as front page news in Japan, Johnson said it was reported as "Park Out" in the U.S., and Zahid and Burgos said they were envious for their countries, of the protests having led to impeachment. The second talk was the U.S. deployment of THAAD in South Korea, and reactions, including discussion of China's adversity and economic boycott protests against South Korea. The guest was actor Choi Min-yong who appeared in hanbok to discuss living with nature in the digital era. He said he had lived in the mountains for two years, to reflect on himself. The talks included a vote by members for their favorite nature retreats, mountain villages, fishing villages, or farm villages. They also discussed natural hermits, natural healing methods, and ideas for eco-friendly Life.
142	"I Believe That I Need To Do Things That No One Else Will Do To Succeed"	March 28, 2017	N/A
Tetto was absent again, and U.S. intern Joseph Nemelka from Utah, a Korea University political science student, replaced him. The first talk was presented by Ogi, Shinzō Abe's unpopularity and whether he should resign; approval ratings for leaders, whether they should resign if unpopular, and whether past leaders should continue voicing opinions. The guest was trot singer Jang Yun-jeong who had dreamed of being an idol, and instead, became the only trot singer in her 20s when she did not succeed. She discussed this pioneering spirit or Blue Ocean Strategy that she favors. Cast discussed the pros and cons of success rates in the "blue", "red" and "purple" oceans of business concepts. Patry talked about a past business failure and Loubert hinted at a future venture he was interested in.
143	"I Prefer Being in a Team Rather Than Alone"	April 3, 2017	N/A
The show introduced a new segment, a "b-board chart" that would rank the cast's countries on various subjects; today's was air quality index and healthiest, with Italy placing number one in the later. The second topic was presented by Mondi, a controversial public broadcasting program that was abolished due to its racism and sexism; with further general discussion on the value of public broadcasting and stereotypes of each country. Guests were Sojin and Yura of Girl's Day who discussed their group's teamwork and having passed the "seven-year-jinx" mark when many K-pop groups disband. They talked about working together to highlight the strengths of each member in the group during performances. Cast talked about the pros and cons of teamwork, including sports activities – soccer, baseball and basketball clubs.
144	"What Daughters And Fathers Say Can Be Difficult To Understand"	April 10, 2017	N/A
The first topic was a "b-board" ranking of the cost of living and most expensive cities; a discussion of food, rent and living expenses in various cities including Seoul which ranked in the top ten. The second topic was presented by India's Lucky, the assaults on doctors and medical professionals treating patients and whether there should be stricter penalties and protection for public service workers. The guests were actors Yoon Je-moon and Jung So-min who recently appeared in the film Dad Is Daughter to discuss communication and relations betweens fathers and daughters. Cast discussed generational differences and personal experiences with their fathers. This was the last episode for Lucky Abhishek Gupta, who announced he was leaving for personal reasons.
145	"I Make People Laugh, But I Can't Laugh."	April 17, 2017	N/A
The first talk was a comparison of flower festivals in each country. The "global side dish" talk was presented by Klabunde, a discussion of Germany's new "wage public disclosure act" starting in July, attempting to solve the gender pay gap and promote equal pay for equal work by mandating companies of over 200 employees to disclose salaries within the company. The guest was comedian and script writer Yoo Byung-jae with the topic of black comedy, satire and blacklisting. He called the latter a ridiculous practice, without clear standards; and cast gave examples – Nazi book burnings, book censorship in the United States, a Democratic Hollywood's aversion to Trump supporters, bad image of religious persons due to past cults in Japan, and anti-Islamic SNS banning in Pakistan.
146	"I Believe Men Should Be Entitled To Paternity Leave."	April 24, 2017	N/A
For this episode representatives Loubert, Hussain and Ogi were replaced by four female interns: Eva (Russia), studying to be a simultaneous interpreter for international conferences, has made trips to Korea since she was 6-years-old with her pianist mother, is married for three years; Ida (Sweden), came to live in Korea three years ago, likes horseback riding and described Sweden as beautiful, but boring, with only one club in her town; Natumi (Japan), from Kanazawa, the "small Kyoto", studying political science at Korea University, said she wishes Ogi would be more forward in debates on the show; and Olivia (France), speaks French, Chinese, Korean and English, Ewha Womans University PhD in international studies, went to northern China on a Princeton scholarship and taught at a small university there for a year, currently works as a lecturer on French culture at the Korea National Diplomatic Academy, and has a 10-month-old baby with her husband she met in Korea eight years prior. The guest, Google APAC's Director Mickey Kim, who is part of a dual-income family, presented the topic of work and family and the need for paternity leave for working fathers. He said Google, and other Silicon Valley companies, provided parental leave of one to three months and he had used seven weeks for his own child's birth and when his wife's maternity leave expired. He said he was interested in the issue because of both his mother and wife being working women. He said the key points are gender equality in the roles of the couple and a shared schedule, along with a healthy work culture provided by the employer that allows flexible work and leave time. Cast selected their choice of best country to raise a child, with Mondi picking Australia for its nature and weather, and Wang picking the U.S. for the English language.
147	"I Prefer To Get More Sleep Rather Than Eat"	May 1, 2017	N/A
Ogi, who was busy with a new job, was replaced for this show with Japanese female intern Hasegawa Natsuko from Tochigi, a Korea University Korean language and literature student. And Swedish intern Ida was present for a second time (also on Ep. 146) for the main topic with guests. The first talk was a "b-board" rating of the world's best airports. Talk included Incheon International Airport at third place, having dropped from second the prior year; Tetto mentioned its cultural attractions and jjimjilbang and Mondi its fast check-in. Cast discussed their own problems with 63rd ranked John F. Kennedy International Airport; Klabunde missed his flight due to lengthy immigration questioning, and host Yoo joked about his encounter when arriving for filming of Where Is My Friend's Home. On airplane incidents, Wang said the United Express Flight 3411 incident attracted a lot of attention in China and was "obvious racial discrimination against Asians". Guests Kim Se-jeong and Kim Na-young of Gugudan presented the topic of sleep and the lack of it due to their group's sometimes busy schedule. Se-jeong said sleep times vary, but they usually do filming late at night, and during one period she only got one hour of sleep for four days. Na-young revealed her own sleepwalking and sleep talking. Cast shared unique beds like Sweden's luxury Hastens, Italy's weightless waterbed, China's earthquake bed, and Mexico's nail mattress.
148	"I Think Present Life Is More Important Than The Future"	May 8, 2017	N/A
The first topic was the upcoming 2017 South Korean presidential election and elections in other countries, including voting methods, like Japan's handwritten ballots and France's handwritten ballots in envelopes. Guests were singers Jang Jae-in and Parc Jae-jung with a discussion of whether to live for today or the future. Jang talked about her three-year break from work due to dystonia and regaining her health and her present YOLO attitude.
149	"I Think Adults Need A Teacher"	May 15, 2017	N/A
The first topic was the pessimistic index for each country, with South Korea rated third, and a discussion of its Asian Dust, civil defense and unemployment problems. To celebrate South Korea Teacher's Day, former representative Sam Okyere joined the main talk on adult education with guest Sohn Mina. Okyere helped build the "572 school" in his home country of Ghana and Sohn, a travel writer and school principal, recently established a "school of life" for adults. The discussion was joined by Alain de Botton, founder of The School of Life project, via video conference call. De Botton answered cast questions and said adults need time to define their own personal successes in life.
150	"I Want To Be Reborn As An Animal"	May 22, 2017	N/A
The first talk was a ranking of students' satisfaction by country; including discussion about homework, parents contributions and foods they eat. Intern John Wahome from Nairobi, Kenya joined the main discussion with the guest, actor Yoon Park, on animals and pets. Yoon said he was raised with four dogs and finding them preferable to humans, hoped to be born as an animal in his next life. Wahome talked about the custom of killing a lion in Kenya at age thirteen to become an adult man who can marry. Talks included animal rights and welfare, and laws.
151	"I am dissatisfied with the discrimination between popular and non-popular sports."	May 29, 2017	N/A
The first topic, presented by Ogi, was the negative aspect of insurance company policies in Japan, their profit making and the insured's anxiety. Talk included kidnap and ransom insurance and the insurance dispute over the Collapse of the World Trade Center. Hussain and Mazzucchelli were replaced for the main topic by Russian intern Dimitri, who has been in South Korea for twelve years, and former representative Carlos Gorito from Brazil, who helped promote Pyeongchang 2018 at Brazil's Rio 2016. The guest Kim Yeon-koung, a professional volleyball player, spoke about discrimination against unpopular sports. Kim said after she participated in the Rio games for South Korea's team, interest had risen in volleyball, compared to before; and added that it was more popular in Turkey where she played for Fenerbahçe Women's Volleyball, with support and investment greater there.
152	"I Think That Dance Should Be Recognized As An Art"	June 5, 2017	N/A
The global rating topic was about products made in each members' country and the impact on national image, including an assessment of Korean products. 22-year-old intern Suetlana from Russia joined the main talk and said while studying Korean she had enjoyed watching the K-drama Boys Over Flowers. Guests were girl group members, soloists and dancers Hyoyeon of Girls' Generation and Minzy of the recently disbanded 2NE1 to discuss dance being recognized as an art. Talks included a variety of dances, traditional to trendy, and famous dancers around the world.
153	"I Think That Music Is The Common Language of the World"	June 12, 2017	N/A
The first topic discussed the ranking of world leaders, with South Korea's Moon Jae-in coming in seventh place, the first time the country placed in the top ten. The cast also praised his handsome appearance. For the main topic, Patry and Hussian were absent and replaced by two interns, Austria's Manu, a Korea University cinema student and Finland's Petri, a Yonsei University international politics graduate student. The guest was famous opera singer Sumi Jo with a discussion of music as a common language of the world and talk included the popularity of classical music in various countries. Jo, who acted in the K-drama Dream High as Suzy's teacher, said she was sad about the prejudice that classical music is difficult and is aware that many young people like K-pop.
154	"I Think The Fandom Culture Is Not A Shame"	June 19, 2017	N/A
The first talk was smartphone average usage time, with China placing second behind number one's Brazil (with an average of 4 hours and 48 minutes), and South Korea placing sixth. Unconventional phone usage, such as paying for street food in China, was mentioned. Mazzucchelli was replaced by intern Shamsa from Abu Dhabi in the main talks; an anthropology student at Seoul National University who studied Korean language at home due to being a K-pop fan. She said her favorites were Shinee and VIXX, especially VIXX singer N. Members of Apink, Son Na-eun and Park Cho-rong Apink presented the topic of Korean pop idol fandom culture, discussing fans in their 30s and 40s who feel awkward and embarrassed to be fans. Park said that she had been an avid fan of BoA and discussed extreme fan culture, whose behavior might make older fans uncomfortable. Both said they would possibly date a fan, Son adding that the fan would need to accept her as "human". Their group had recently received death threats from a male who purported to be a fan.
155	"I Have Lived My Entire Life Without Marrying"	June 26, 2017	N/A
The first talk was presented by Korean American actor Steven Yeun, known for his role in The Walking Dead. He said that while filming movies that transcended countries, ethnicities and cultures, he began to think that even though the languages are different that communication and understanding were possible. The director of Yeun's recent film Okja, Bong Joon-ho, joined the talk via telephone and complimented Yeun's acting and "sexy" eyes. Loubert (absent for the entire episode) and Hussain, were replaced by three interns. Jiang Lizi from China's Guizhou came to South Korea because she liked K-dramas, in particular Autumn in My Heart and said she wanted to communicate the position of Chinese women. 23-year-old Umaima from Morocco, a Seoul National University construction and environmental engineering student, said South Korea is famous in the civil engineering field. Marine from France, is a Yuna Kim fan, a hotelier and a student at Hanyang University. The guest, fashion designer of top stars, Han Hye-yeon, discussed marriage as a matter of choice and said she doesn't find it necessary. She talked about Coco Chanel as an example of not marrying and having a successful life.
156	"I Am Willing To Give Up A Stable Career To Do Something I Like"	July 3, 2017	N/A
The first talk was top tourist destinations ranked in 2017; Hamburg was tenth, preceded by Detroit, Tijuana and the Grand Teton National Park. The entire Canadian province was first and Patry recommended Tadoussac and talked about the 150th anniversary of Canada. The main topic, selecting a suitable career, was presented by guests, musical actors, American Michael K. Lee and South Korean Ko Eun-sung. Lee was a judge on the JTBC show Phantom Singer while Ko was a participant, and are currently working on a musical production of The Rocky Horror Show. The two performed "Le Temps des Cathedrales" from the Notre-Dame de Paris (musical) for the cast in English, French and Korean. Lee had studied to be a doctor before becoming an actor. The cast took an aptitude test and their results were revealed and talks included various jobs and talents and special education methods parents use to find their children's talents.
157	"I Am Worried About Looking Too Young"	July 10, 2017	N/A
The show started with a new segment that would examine global events and incidents, starting with accidents involving transportation. Talks included the 2017 Bahawalpur explosion, a Shanghai woman who threw coins into a plane's engine for luck, and general stories from members about incidents they had. Mondi was absent for this talk. Guest, twenty-year-old actress Seo Shin-ae, a child actress who debuted fourteen years ago, presented the topic of her concern that her appearance was too young looking. She recounted that a grandmother had mistaken her for an elementary school student and said she hopes to be known as a "sexy and mature" actress, too. Discussion included other young looking actors and results of a physiognomy or face reading of the cast and hosts.
158	"Whenever I Travel Overseas I Worry About Getting a Disease From That Country"	July 17, 2017	N/A
Two visiting interns joined the episode's single discussion, with Mondi absent again: Yemen's 23-year-old Suhella, a Seoul University political science major who hopes to work for an international NGO in the future, and Nairobi Kenya's Phillys, a Sookmyung Women's University international business management program student, whose brother John appeared on Episode 150. Guests were husband and wife physicians Hong Hye-geol (medical columnist) and Yeo Esther (preventative medicine) with a discussion of general health and contagious diseases, epidemics, and preventative measures. Talks included banning travel to infected countries, Korea's being top in tuberculosis and hepatitis B, the naming of Japanese encephalitis, Zika virus, restless legs syndrome, and PAH in burned meat consumption.
159	"Meeting People Feels Like Work To Me"	July 24, 2017	N/A
Two interns were present for the entire show. Italy's Stefania, also from Venice, replaced Mondi; an international business graduate student who studied many languages when young and liked Korean most. Great Britain's Aancod travels around the world playing music and having a good time. The first talk was a rating segment on the world's best museums and most attended. Members of the top ten rankings introduced their history and experiences with a friendly competition and talks included unique museums, like the Paris Sewer Museum. The guest was CNBLUE member, solo artist and actor Jung Yong-hwa who presented the topic of human relationships and how they feel like work to him due to his profession and meeting many people regularly. He described himself as a "homebody" who prefers meeting friends like Lee Joon who respect each other's need for privacy and quiet time. Talks included the 'people diet' or 'human network diet', a current hot topic in South Korea, and isolating awkward family members from networks.
160	"It's Hard For Me To Discipline My Child"	July 31, 2017	N/A
The first topic was a list of consumer boycotts based on the faults of the owners of the companies and pros and cons of supporting them. The week's intern, Khabarovsk, Russia's Ina joined the main talk. She was born in communist Soviet Union and moved to South Korea at age eighteen when her father was sent there for work; finished graduate school, has been married for nine years, and has a daughter. The main talk of child discipline was presented by the guest, singer and actor Ahn Jae-wook, a new husband and father of a 17-month-old daughter. He said he is debating child care issues with his wife, such as how to get his daughter to sleep, and wishes to be a friend to his daughter, who he talks to all the time. Talks included parenting methods from other countries, baby toys, use of corporal punishment and child abuse. Intern Ina said that in the Soviet Union most children were sent to kindergarten as parents had to work or were sent to jail.
161	"I Believe in Urban Legends and Ghost Stories"	August 7, 2017	N/A
Prior cast member Lucky Gupta joined the show for the first talk, along with a JTBC weathercaster Kim Min-ah. On the topic of extreme weather and South Korea's heat, Lucky said people assumed because he was from India he was not warm, but he said that South Korea was more humid. Kim added that the discomfort level has also been high. The main talk was presented by actress Yum Jung-ah who said she believes in urban legends and ghost stories. She said her nickname is "Dongtan Mom" where she lives, and she spoke for the housewives there and named the most popular cast. The discussion included the horror films she has appeared in and other stories, during which cast were surprised with a prop fright.
162	"I'm Worried There Might Not Be Any Food Left in the Future"	August 14, 2017	N/A
The first talk concerned pets and which countries raise the largest number. Talks included good deeds like President Moon's adoption of Tory and controversies like Justin Bieber's abandonment of his pet monkey in Germany. The main talk was presented by comedians Yu Min-sang and Kim Jun-hyun (previously appeared on Episode 42), about available foods of the future and food security. Discussion included most foods produced and consumed in the world, insect foods, GMOs, and which countries were responding best to the food crisis.
163	"I Often Go To Overseas Bookstores Even Though I Can't Read The Books"	August 21, 2017	N/A
The show had one main topic about world literature with guest, best-selling author, Kim Young-ha and two interns; Hussain was absent. Bedford, United Kingdom's James, a Yonsei University language student, came to South Korea two years prior as an English teacher. Ekerö, Sweden's Oscar studied Korean for two years at a Stockholm college before continuing in South Korea and first liked K-pop, before favoring hip hop and artist Zion.T. Talks included famous literary awards, most translated book ranking, reading trends, libraries, bookstores, bestsellers, genres and a debate on E-books vs. print books.
164	"I Prepared For One Movie For Forty Years."	August 28, 2017	N/A
The first talk was the 2017 North Korea crisis with special guest Lee Sang-bok, host of the JTBC political newscast Political Desk; Loubert was absent for this segment. Lee explained the current conflict between North Korea and the U.S. and cast discussed their countries reactions to it. The next topic was presented by French film director Luc Besson, the lengthy amount of time, forty years, that he spent preparing for Valerian and the City of a Thousand Planets. He said he tries to make the best picture possible and after seeing the film Avatar, he abandoned his script and started writing again. He said his favorite actor to work with was Choi Min-sik. Cast discussed similar lengthy film making and favorite directors from their countries; and performed lines from Besson's films in their own languages for him to identify. Loubert's brother, also, appeared on a video call to ask the director a question about Le Grand Bleu.
165	"I Am Always Stressing And Sweating To Mediate"	September 4, 2017	N/A
The first talk was the regulation of fake news, presented by Klabunde due to a recent German law set to fine illegal content, if not removed in twenty-four hours. The cast debated legal punishment and sanctions of SNS posts and false news; and discussed each countries countermeasures and internet ethics education programs. The guest was Chung Sye-kyun, chairman of the National Assembly who talked about his job arbitrating meetings there. Two interns joined the talk, Venezuela's Antonio, who has been staying on Jeju Island and UK's 27-year-old Hamed Arif, a prior flight attendant currently studying in South Korea. Talks included features and dress codes of the National Assembly and other legislative bodies around the world; images of parliamentarians, and struggles and fights that ensued between political parties.
166	"I'm Glad That Variety Shows On Knowledge Are Popular, But I feel Pressured To Study"	September 11, 2017	N/A
The first talk was on tax policies and was joined by an intern previously on Episode 153, Finland's Petri, a Yonsei University graduate student. The cast discussed wealth and taxes, with Petri explaining that his country has one of highest taxes in the world, at 52 percent, but offers the best welfare and education systems. They also talked about odd taxations such as Estonia's fart tax and Japan's proposed "handsome tax" for men. Guests were prior television announcer and talk show host Jo Woo-jong and current JTBC announcer Kang Ji-young with a discussion of infotainment or variety shows on knowledge and how they prepared to host them. Kang, known as the "glasses goddess" tried on different glasses of cast members. Talks included the various countries' information programs and knowledge gathering for the shows. Kang said people in their twenties do their research with internet searches.
167	"I Keep Working After I Retire"	September 18, 2017	N/A
The first guest or intern was South Korean psychiatrist Yang Jae-woong, a mental health specialist, for a discussion of increased mental illnesses in various countries. Yang spoke about the reluctance in South Korea for people to seek help or take medications. He said the K-drama It's Okay, That's Love well expressed a mental illness. The guest was ballerina Kang Sue-jin who retired from Germany's Stuttgart Ballet company and became director and artistic director of the Korea National Ballet. Cast talked about her popularity in Germany, Switzerland and China and photos of her feet, which were well-known in Japan. Discussion included retirement possibilities or continuing to work with a new career.
168	"Special Chuseok Travel Show in Seoul And Japan With Cast And Their Brothers"	September 25, 2017	N/A
The special Chuseok show opened with a cast discussion of family members. Zahid described his large family, where he is the fifth member, and said his eldest brother quit his studies to help with the family when his father died. The rest of the show was a travel special with two of the hosts, each an only child, joining cast members and their brothers for a "brother" experience. Loubert met his older brother Xavier and his nephew Keriyan in Seoul for a visit to Naksan Park, then met host Jun in Tokyo. Yoo met Ogi's two older brothers Shinji and Yoshinobu for a visit in Kurashiki with Ogi explaining to him the courtesy and manners of Japan beforehand.
169	"The History And Usage Of World Languages And Alphabets"	October 9, 2017	N/A
The October 9 episode date celebrated Hangul Day with a talk about world languages and alphabets, with third time guest Cho Seung-yeon, a world history author proficient in seven languages. Two interns joined the discussion – Alyona from Novosibirsk, Russia, studied Korean language at Novosibirsk State University, in-country six years and completed a master's degree in Busan; and Henry Pahala Pinilih a Gadjah Mada University graduate from Semarang, Indonesia, in-country three years and an intern at a Korean international trade company. Cho explained language in depth based on the understanding of history and culture of each country. Cast discussed their impressions of the Korean language and Hangul as they first experienced them, including how beautiful they found the written characters. Talk included languages of each country, honorific words, new words and the inclusion of foreign words.
170	"Nuptial Songs Are The Highlight of a Wedding"	October 16, 2017	N/A
The first talk was a discussion of the best locations around the world for autumn leaf color, with Mondi and Patry sharing their favorite local trip to Jirisan mountain and vicinity. Tetto and Ogi were absent for the main talk about wedding songs presented by second time guest, ballad singer, K.Will. Three interns joined the talk – Joel from Washington, D.C., in-country five years, a professional ping pong player and friend of Ryu Seung-min; 23-year-old Nuria from Lisbon, Portugal, a Catholic University of Korea student who studied Korean language after becoming a fan of Shinee and K-dramas in middle school; and 25-year-old Aiden from Bandar-e Anzali, Iran, in-country nine years, works in his family's restaurant, and DJ's and composes songs as hobbies. K.Will said he had sung at seven hundred weddings, sometimes as many as four in a day. Talks included celebratory birthday and seasonal songs; as well as original, banned and farewell songs.
171	"How I Die Is More Important Than How I Live"	October 23, 2017	N/A
The first global talk was about misdemeanors, joined by a female intern Thanh from Hanoi, Vietnam, in-country six years; and whose appearance attracted viewer attention, who complimented her well-spoken Korean language and resemblance to several actresses, including Kim Tae-hee, Han Hyo-joo and Jung So-min. Talks included infractions of public display of affection, traffic (including speeding, unusual road signs and musical roads), and public urination. The main discussion about life and death was joined by Nepal's prior representative Sujan Shakya and presented by actors Sung Ji-ru and Jeon Mi-seon, currently filming a family film about the subject. Talks included thoughts about death – traditional funerals (such as Pakistan's brief one and Nepal's lengthy one of 13 days), miraculous survivors of death and headstone inscriptions.
172	"I Can't Throw My Old Clothes Away, In Case They Come Back"	October 30, 2017	N/A
The first segment was an 'eyes on you' or issues from around the world, joined by Myanmar's intern Than Chaw Tun, a major at University of Foreign Languages, Yangon in Korean language and Pukyong National University in architectural engineering, and currently a Hyundai Engineering & Construction construction supervisor. Talks included the United States' withdrawal from UNESCO, various World Heritage Sites and Rohingya persecution in Myanmar (2016–present). The main talk of fashion was presented by Shinee members Minho and Taemin, both appearing a second time on the show. Two interns joined – 24-year-old Zeno from Cape Town, South Africa, a wardrobe stylist who came to South Korea for its fashion and admires André Kim; and 23-year-old Matthew Nowicz from Piotrków Trybunalski, Poland, a model in-country three years, who has worked with Jun Ji-hyun, Song Joong-ki and Park Shin-hye. Discussion included President Obama's mention of SHINee at the 2017 Asian Leadership Conference, and, per Minho, the group's best dressed (Key who is trendy) and worst dressed (Taemin whose airport fashion used to be slippers and training pants). Other talks included best fashion weeks, past and current trends, and SHINee members recognition of G-Dragon as a fashion leader.
173	"I Want To Save Energy Every Time Lightning Strikes"	November 6, 2017	N/A
The weekly intern was 28-year-old Anna from Spain, in-country five years, with a master's degree and employment in broadcasting. Members discussed their country's official position on the issue of Catalonia independence. Ogi said Japan hadn't made a statement on it, but netizens were interested in how it would affect the soccer team FC Barcelona, with Anna stating the club's president's intentions of staying in the Spanish league. The main talk was energy conservation, presented by guest Ko Ji-yong, member of Sechs Kies, current businessman and part of the cast on the variety show The Return of Superman, along with his son Seung-jae. Klabunde was replaced by Germany's 22-year-old Philipp, a Korea University Korean studies and philosophy student. Among other things, Ko spoke about Nikola Tesla's thoughts about making energy from electrons in the air, which Ko hopes to become a reality with advanced technology.
174	"Emotional Labor Should Also Be Recognized For Worker's Compensation"	November 13, 2017	N/A
The first talk was drinking culture with a Russian intern Sasha from Dalnegorsk, in-country eleven years, and who spoke about vodka when members shared alcoholic drinks famous in their countries. Other discussion included drinking etiquette and toasts. Park Hye-jin, a freelance broadcaster formerly on MBC TV, presented the topic of emotional labor. The talk was joined by intern Nidhi from Mumbai, India, an MBA student at Yonsei University. Park said Korean telemarketers were in a sensitive position and members shared other examples. Tetto volunteered that the term originated in the U.S. and Wang shared a part-time job experience that affected him.
175	"I Want To Remember Everything That's Been Forgotten"	November 20, 2017	N/A
Cast first discussed state visits, in particular U.S. President Trump's recent visits to Asian countries. Talks also included details and issues of other state visits from each country. Guests, film director Jang Hang-jun and actor Kim Mu-yeol, who just completed Forgotten together, brought the subject of memories and nostalgia for things of the past. Jang shared jokingly that Kim was less handsome than he had thought upon meeting him. Kim shared that Jang doesn't give him a chance to talk, which has enabled him to become a better listener. Talks included personal memories (Jang talked about 1980s boxing) and historical events and items, as well as memory abilities and retention.
176	"I'm Thinking About Giving Early Education to a Child Who Is Showing A Potential in Sports"	November 27, 2017	N/A
Cast first discussed holiday charitable donations and acts. Ogi talked about a Japanese charity that donates 100 yen (amounting to five meals for children) each time a hashtag accompanies a hand-made photograph of the onigiri. Major League Baseball player Shin-Soo Choo introduced the main topic of providing early education for children who show an aptitude in art and physical education. The weekly intern was 28-year-old Olga from Ussuriysk Russia, in-country 9 years to study, and a newlywed in Busan. Choo said her Gyeongsand accent reminded him of his grandmother, and cast gave attention to Choo being host Moo's doppelgänger. Choo said that since he has played baseball in the U.S. for 17 years, he was happy to be on the show to communicate with his South Korean fans. Choo talked about his three children, two sons and a daughter, who all train in sports; and described his own athletic regime and special ceremonies. Cast also discussed early education and training activities in their countries.
177	"I'm More Comfortable on the Ocean Than Land"	December 4, 2017	N/A
The weekly interns were Kevin from Palembang, Indonesia, in-country 5 years, who studies computer engineering and was a prior rapper in his country. He and host Yoo had a rap battle in Indonesian and Korean. The other intern was 27-year-old Jorge Peña from Columbia, in-country 4 years and an accountant at a Swedish company. Peña said he was told he resembled Mondi, who welcomed him. The main talk was presented by Kim Seung-jin, a documentary film producer and sailor. He discussed his trip, sailing around the world on a yacht by himself in 209 days, without stopping at a port, without power and without aide or support. After working for years producing documentary films, he gave up a comfortable life to prepare for the trip, selling his home to purchase the yacht and with his family's support. He shared tales and film footage of the adventure and members of each country talked about beaches, marine life and sea pollution. The show ended with an announcement of the first season's ending after 3 years and 5 months to take a break to re-organize while JTBC airs a drama. A retrospective included the ratings which averaged 2–3%, 203 guests and 122 one-day interns or representatives; and the most unforgettable guest noted as Shin Hae-chul, who talked about "dreams and reality", and died three months later.
