= List of Non-Summit episodes (2016) =

- No. of episodes: 52

Release
- Original network: JTBC
- Original release: January 4 – December 26, 2016

Season chronology
- ← Previous; 2015 Next → 2017

Non-Summit (Korean: 비정상회담) is a South Korean talk-variety show, part of JTBC's Monday night lineup. The show aired from July 7, 2014 to December 4, 2017.

== Episodes ==
The show began with eleven foreign men cast as "Representatives" and three South Korean hosts. "Visiting interns" were incorporated into the cast, as regular members took vacations, and some left the show. The debate topics are presented by visiting South Korean guests.

No. in season	Title	Original release date	Rating
79	"I Believe Utopia Exists"	January 4, 2016	N/A
The intern was 30-year-old Hongik University visual arts major, and rapper Kang Chun-hyeok, a South Korean who defected from North Korea and lived as a kotjebi there. Photographer Kim Jung-man presented the topic of Utopia, mentioning his desire to have no college entrance exams.
80	"I'm Apathetic To Politics"	January 11, 2016	N/A
The week's intern was 32-year-old Kiki Karnadi, an office worker from Indonesia. Lawyer and politician Na Kyung-won presented the topic of interest or apathy to politics.
81	"I Only Care About My Emotional Support Pet"	January 18, 2016	N/A
The intern was 33-year-old Rodrigo Diaz from Chile, who works for the power plant of an engineering company, went to Seoul National University and has a 16 month old son. He said his country was the longest north-south country in the world, with a length of 3,400 km, among other things. American born South Korean actress Han Ye-seul presented the topic of pets and the discussion included the companion dog and the emotional bonding with pets.
82	"I Don't Feel Comfortable With Personal Branding"	January 25, 2016	N/A
The intern was 27-year-old Ukrainian Andri Kurtov, linguistics scholar at the Academy of Korean Studies, who discussed the beauty of his country and of South Korea. The guest was former politician Rhyu Si-min with the topic personal branding; he said he has no plans to return to politics.
83	"A 33-Year-Old With Nothing But Debt"	February 1, 2016	N/A
The weekly intern was 23-year-old Do An Ninh from Vietnam who shared his singing talent with the cast, and talked about his country, including eating snake meat as part of the Vietnamese cuisine, which he said was good for stamina. Fashion designer Hwang Jae-geun presented the topic of debt, discussing issues of student loans and taking loans to study abroad.
84	"Couple's Holiday Fights"	February 8, 2016	N/A
The intern was Ireland's Cillian Byrne, a 30-year-old English teacher in Suncheon, who discussed the culture of the Irish pub and drinking life in Ireland, among other things. Kim Sook, was a guest on the show for the second time (previously on Ep. 45), with her "virtual husband" Yoon Jung-soo from the JTBC show With You, to continue exploring how a couple gets along during the holidays.
85	"I Want To Unfriend 198 Friends"	February 15, 2016	N/A
The intern was 23-year-old student Leo Ranta, from Finland, who sparred with representative Johnsen, and discussed the culture of the Finnish sauna, and the popularity of Finland's Joulupukki. Comedians Jang Dong-min and Yu Sang-moo were the guests and discussed "real friends" and whether to get rid of those that are not.
86	"I'm Anti-Mainstream"	February 22, 2016	N/A
The intern was 25-year-old Jargalmaa Suldbold from Mongolia who has been in South Korea about 2 1/2 years and is a graduate student at Seoul National University, of life sciences. He spoke about the life of Genghis Khan, among other things. Film Director Lee Byeong-heon, latest Twenty, presented the topic of mainstream vs. non-mainstream. He judged an acting contest between Lindemann, Zhang and Rashad El-Baz, with the later winning Lee's praise as best representing the film's piece he chose. The show also aired a "film production" the cast staged for the director.
87	"I Want To Raise My Children Abroad"	February 29, 2016	N/A
The intern was 30-year-old Gabriel Schvetz, from Argentina, an industrial engineering graduate student the last three years at Seoul National University. He spoke of his country's landmarks, like Iguazu Falls and their love of soccer player Maradona. The guest, actor and father Kwon Oh-joong presented the topic of children's happiness; the show cited "survey results showing that Korean children's life satisfaction is the lowest among OECD nations, citing the research done by the Ministry of Health and Welare."
88	"Preparing For Old Age At 30"	March 7, 2016	N/A
The intern was 34-year-old (Korean age) Jack Stenhouse from New Zealand who has been in South Korea for seven years, taught English for two years and now works in trade. He talked about the history of Australia and New Zealand having been British colonies and the New Zealand flag debate. The guests were two more of SHINee's members, Jonghyun and Taemin (Onew and Min-ho were on Episode 47), who discussed planning for their older age. Jonghyun hopes to be a songwriter, and Taemin wants to work in a sports related field. Taemin danced to his recent solo song release Press Your Number and gave host Jun a lesson.
89	"I Think That The Korean Wave Is Just A Bubble"	March 14, 2016	N/A
The intern was Sweden's Ola Håkansson, a 27-year-old who studied Korean language at Yonsei University. He shared that he had small acting roles in music videos, Super Junior's "Devil", Girls' Generation's Lion Heart, and AOA's "Heart Attack". The topic was the third hallyu presented by actor Yoon Sang-hyun. He shared that a K-drama he was in, My Fair Lady had viewer ratings of over ninety percent in Cuba during filming time in 2009, and he visited there at the invitation of the Minister of Culture.
90	"My Lack Of Time Management Skills Makes Me Nervous"	March 21, 2016	N/A
The intern was 22-year-old Rinchen Dawa from Bhutan, a student at Kyung Hee University who has been in South Korea for 5 years and was first attracted in high school when he watched the K-drama Autumn in My Heart. He discussed the Gross National Happiness, 97% of the people being happy, even with lower incomes, and satisfaction with the Buddhist ideology. He also said that the Korean wave is popular there, with EXO a favorite. Guests were B1A4's Sandeul and Baro bringing the topic of time management skills, or lack of them. Sandeul serenaded host Jun with a love song from the current musical Three Musketeers - D'Artganan he and B1A4's CNU are in.
91	"I Think We Can Discover People's Hidden Desires by Analyzing Big Data"	March 28, 2016	N/A
The first part of the show was a discussion with three Chinese interns - Zhao Lijing, a 30-year-old from Shandong, Chung-Ang University theatre studies; Zhang Wenjun, a 25-year-old from Anshan, Hanyang University Economics and Finance; and Ma Guojin, a 24-year-old from Beijing, Korea University Korean language and literature. Zhang Wenjun and Rep. Zhang had a voice competition; and their discussion included generational differences from the past. The second half of the show was with guest Song Gil-young, a big data expert, who discussed understanding people's behavior using data and whether you could know people's hidden desires from it.
92	"I Want To Move Because Of The Neighbors"	April 4, 2016	N/A
The intern was Yuri Kim, a 30-year-old from Belarus, who has been in South Korea for three years and studies linguistics and computers at Yonsei University. The discussion included human trafficking in Belarus. Comedian and actor Ji Suk-jin presented the topic of problems with neighbors in today's modern society. He gave the example of gifting his new neighbors with rice cakes, finding some were glad while some thought he was soliciting them.
93	"I Always Compare Myself With Others"	April 11, 2016	N/A
The show began with a special note of remembrance for the sinking of MV Sewol two years ago at this time. The intern was 36-year-old Szabolcs Sárközi from Hungary, who did undergraduate Korean studies in Hungary and post-graduate work in Korea. He said he speaks Korean with a Daegu accent, having learned there. Retired football player Lee Chun-soo was the guest with the topic of comparing yourself to others or inferiority complex. He won a place kick competition with Mondi before the discussion.
94	"I Want Attention All The Time"	April 18, 2016	N/A
The intern was Nihat Khalilzade from Azerbaijan, a 25-year-old computer engineering student at Hanyang University. He performed one of the Azerbaijani dances and arm wrestled with Varsakopoulos. His discussion included one of the oldest religions Zoroastrianism. There were two guests, Muzie, who performs in a musical group UV with show host Yoo, and manhwa artist Lee Byung-gun. The topic was SNS and wanting constant attention. Muzie and Yoo performed their song "No Cool, I'm Sorry."
95	"I Think Minimalism Is The Only Meaningful Way To Live"	April 25, 2016	N/A
The intern was 29 year-old Muhammad Khalid Bin Ismail, from Malaysia, a mechanical engineer who studied at Korea University who has been in South Korea for nine years. Singers Wheesung and K.Will, scheduled for an upcoming performance together, "Bromance Concert" were the guests with the topic of desiring a minimalist lifestyle. K.Will sang a little of his OST "Talk Love" from the popular K-drama Descendants of the Sun and the two performed a duet of Wheesung's song "Can't We," trying to outdo each other with the ending notes.
96	"I Believe That Most Conspiracy Theories Are True"	May 2, 2016	N/A
The show began with the cast's discussion of the upcoming Mother's Day. The weekly intern was 37-year-old Iranian Mohsen Shafiee who said K-drama Jewel in the Palace and Song Il-gook of Jumong were popular in Iran. The guest was Apink's Jung Eun-ji with the topic of conspiracy theories. She performed her song "Hopefully Sky" which features Harim from her debut solo album.
97	"I Find Myself Acting Just Like The Old Rude Guys I Used To Hate When I Was Young"	May 9, 2016	N/A
There were four interns from the United States. 34-year-old Gabriel (Gabe) from Boston, a model, hypnotist and actor who had an acting part in the K-drama, Descendants of the Sun; 28-year-old Jonathan (Jon), from Kansas, where he studied Korean language, a company English interviewer; 34-year-old Michael, from Washington, D.C. developed an interest in Korea due to his grandfather's participation in the Korean War, and after college, served in the Eighth United States Army in Dongducheon; and 31-year-old Guy, in South Korea for six years, first as a kindergarten teacher, studied Korean for a year at Seoul National University. John tested Yoo and Zhang on their English skills, and the talk included America's eating habits, like fast food and Freshman 15. The guest was actress Youn Yuh-jung who discussed generational differences and ageing. The cast remembered her classic movies including the 1971 Woman of Fire and her film about the haenyeo, Grandmother Gye-choon.
98	"I Shy Away From Discussing Refuge Crisis"	May 16, 2016	N/A
The weekly intern was 25-year-old Ali from Pakistan, a Korea University student and actor, with a recent role in Descendants of the Sun as the boyfriend of the character 'Fatima.' The guest was actor Jung Woo-sung, his return after a three year hiatus on television shows, with the topic of the refugee crisis. As a UNHCR Goodwill Ambassador working to increase public awareness of the humanitarian crisis since 2014, he recently visited Lebanon to meet Syrian refugees.
99	"I'm Scared of Accidents and Disasters"	May 23, 2016	N/A
The week's intern was 29-year-old Francis Okello Ngome from Kenya, an engineering student at Pohang University of Science and Technology. He won the 2015 'people's choice' award on KBS1 for singing national songs and sang for the cast. He said the background of the film The Lion King was Kenya's Hell's Gate National Park and one of the character's names is in one of the official languages of Kenya, Swahili, and sang part of the song Hakuna Matata for them. The guests were actors Yoon Shi-yoon, just out of military service, and Kwak Si-yang, both currently acting in Mirror of the Witch. They discussed natural disasters like earthquakes and emergency measures on trains and buses.
100	"The 100th Episode Special, Part 1"	May 30, 2016	N/A
Prior to the special celebration for the one hundredth episode, hosts and creators met with media to discuss the show's history and remember some guest appearances. In the first part, the cast were joined by prior representatives James Hooper, Julian Quintart, Robin Deiana, Takuya Terada, Ilya Belyakov, Blair Williams and Sujan Shakya, making a total of eighteen for the panel. Staff called it a reunion for the show, with behind the scenes stories and talk about past episodes. Belyakov said his happiest moment was singing the duet with Baek Ji-young; and members acknowledged one another. Deiana and current member Przemysław Krompiec had a breakdance competition, and joined Terada and Okyere for a dance routine to Big Bang's song Bang Bang Bang. Some former guests, including Jung Woo-sung and JTBC colleagues greeted them with video messages.
101	"The 101st Episode Special, Part 2"	June 6, 2016	N/A
The first half of the show was with regular cast, minus Gorito. Varsakopoulos and Patry demonstrated some exercises, the diamond burpee and side crawl to Moo and Zhang. The week's intern was 27-year-old Amine Ammor, from Morocco, a Yonsei University graduate of Global Economy and Strategy studies. He talked about his country, including the Marathon des Sables, Morocco's tea consumption, and the phrase "giving my liver" which means "giving my life." The second half of the show was the conclusion of the prior week's 100th episode meeting with 18 representatives. Some of the discussion included South Korean customs they found strange on first impression; Terada talked about everyone wanting to do things in a group, instead of alone, and Shakya talked about the discrimination against Third World countries.
102	"I Don't Feel Happy Even When I'm Supposed To Be Happy"	June 13, 2016	N/A
The intern was Reuben Ho, a Korea University student from Singapore. He discussed Singapore being called Asia's Silicon Valley, several Singaporean local delicacies, tourist hot spots and the well known strict criminal law of Singapore, including the chewing gum ban in Singapore and prosecution of nose-picking drivers. Guests were Sechs Kies's Kim Jae-duc and rival band H.O.T.'s Tony An who discussed the struggle to find happiness. Due to the show's planned reorganization, this was the final show for nine members - Zhang, Rasch, Okyere, Lindemann, Krompiec, Gorito, Johnsen, Rashad El Baz and Varsakopoulos. The members expressed their gratitude (Gorito was absent and spoke via video), and Zhang stated that he had made many friends. The restructuring replaced PD Kim Hee-jung with another JTBC director Kim No-eun, and retained cast members Patry and Mondi.
103	"Here Come The New Gs"	June 20, 2016	N/A
The episode introduced the seven new representatives who joined old members Patry and Mondi - U.S.'s Mark Tetto (a prior intern on Episode 24), India's "Lucky" Abhishek Gupta, Pakistan's Zahid Hussain, China's Mao Yifeng, France's Aurelien Loubert, Switzerland's Alex Mazzucchelli and Germany's Niklas Klabunde. The new cast introduced themselves and they spent time discussing misconceptions of each other's countries.
104	"The Issue of Brexit"	June 27, 2016	N/A
The week's intern, Emil Price from the United Kingdom, appeared as a special on the show to discuss the recent Brexit issue. The discussion was kickstarted by the new France representative Loubert. The guest was Cao Lu, Chinese member of the K-pop group Fiestar, who presented the topic of working in a foreign country.
105	"I Make A Living By Making People Sad"	July 4, 2016	N/A
The interns were Mexico's 24-year-old Christian Burgos (video producer) who appeared previously on Episode 68, China's Wang Yu (journalism graduate Kyung Hee University, studied international management Yonsei University and television producer in China), and Japan's 25-year-old Hitoshi Ogi (graduate Keio University, and emoticon designer for an animation company). The guest was singer-songwriter Yoon Jong-shin who discussed making a living writing sad songs and the talk included farewell songs, break-up songs, etc.
106	"I Want A New Nickname"	July 11, 2016	N/A
The interns were South Africa's Akeem Pedro (prior intern on Episode 76), a 28-year-old doctoral student in construction management, architectural engineering department at Chung-Ang University and China's Wang Xinlin, a 28-year-old graduate of electrical engineering at Dalian Jiaotong University and currently studying a doctorate in mechanical engineering at Seoul National University. Burgos was, also, present again. One of the topics discussed was presented by representative Klablunde, Germany's recent debate on outlawing after-work e-mails. The guest was Buzz lead singer Min Kyung-hoon, currently on JTBC's Knowing Bros, who discussed his nickname 'SSamJa' given to him ten years ago when he sang the wrong lyrics in a song. Other discussion included bad memories or history of every member and their countries.
107	"I'm Considered Pretty Only Outside Korea"	July 18, 2016	N/A
The show began with an "emergency" discussion of ISIS, soft target terrorism, and recent attacks spreading into Asia, including the 2016 Nice truck attack, the 2016 Atatürk Airport attack, the July 2016 Dhaka attack, and the July 2016 Baghdad bombings. The visiting interns were female, for the first time since the show premiered, Poland's Adela Borowiak, who has a master's degree from Seoul National University in international commerce, and Iran's Najafizadeh Sudeh, who is studying for a master's in textiles and fabric at Hongik University. Borowiak, who speaks six languages English, Chinese, French, Spanish, Korean and Polish, discussed the Violence at UEFA Euro 2016 and Polish football hooliganism. The guest was fashion model Han Jin who said she was only considered pretty outside South Korea and the discussion included each countries' standards of beauty.
108	"We Are Not Comfortable With Living With Others"	July 25, 2016	N/A
The intern was China's Sim Jung, a graduate of Beijing Normal University who came to South Korea as an exchange student ten years prior and currently works at a Chinese entertainment company. He presented the topic and his disagreement with the Permanent Court of Arbitration ruling on the South China Sea dispute, saying the territory had been a part of China since the Han dynasty. Cast had a second talk on the pros and cons of Pokémon Go and whether it should be regulated. Guests were actresses Han Ye-ri and Han Seung-yeon who were currently starring in the JTBC K-drama Age of Youth together and their topic of living with roommates was based on the story line in the drama. Han Seung-yeon said it is uncomfortable due to lack of privacy. Other discussion included sharing economy with all the countries giving examples.
109	"I Feel Anxious Whenever I Have A Long Break"	August 1, 2016	N/A
The intern for the first part of the show was U.S.'s Robert Hamilton from Detroit, who is working on a doctoral dissertation at Seoul National University and presented the topic of recent shootings by police in the U.S., racism and gun control. Cambodia's intern Bot WisalBots, previously on Episode 74, joined the later part of the show; majored in Cambodian literature and arts at Royal University of Phnom Penh and is working on a master's degree at Yonsei University in Korean Culture and Society. The guest was actor and television personality Tak Jae-hoon, who discussed his three year break from his career and feeling anxious. Talks included vacation time and locations for relaxing.
110	"I Don't Have A Firm Grasp On Reality"	August 8, 2016	N/A
The representatives first discussed Switzerland's thoughts on expanding their military, conscription of women in Switzerland and conscription, in general. The guest was 2NE1's Dara with the topic of living in a dream world rather than a realistic one.
111	"Independence Day Special. The History Of Japanese Occupation And Independence"	August 15, 2016	N/A
The show was a National Liberation Day of Korea celebration special, with interns and current representatives pairing off to discuss prior colonizations of various countries. Great Britain's intern, 26-year-old Nathan Jackson from London, who works in marketing at a whiskey company, paired off against India's Lucky. Additional pairings included: France's Loubert against Guinea's intern Gassim Fofana; Italy's Mondi against Libya's 25-year-old intern Amira; China's 28-year-old intern Wang Xinlin (previously on Episode 106) against Japan's 25-year-old intern Hitoshi Ogi (previously on Episode 105); and Mexico's Burgos against the U.S.'s Tetto. Further discussion included World War II and Germany's perspective from Klabunde; and Korean and American issues with Japan. Prolific world history author Cho Seung-yeon, who speaks fluent Korean, Italian, English and French, was the guest, and joined in the talks.
112	"I Believe Sci-Fi Movies Will Become A Reality"	August 22, 2016	N/A
Simon Pegg, most recently of Star Trek Beyond, appeared as the "intern/representative" for his country Great Britain, the first Hollywood actor to appear on the show. He posed the topic of the possibility of science fiction films becoming reality. Prior interns, Japan's Hitoshi Ogi and China's Wang Xinlin, were also present; representatives Mondi and Burgos were absent for the first half of the show. The South Korean guest was comedian Kim Joon-ho who discussed organizing group ventures.
113	"I Want To Escape The City"	August 29, 2016	N/A
The show first had a 'What is so important?' segment with the topic presented by Tetto, the 'no kids zone' in public places. Mondi announced the birth of his son Leonardo, who will be called Leo in Korean. The weekly intern was Nadia from the Netherlands, who is preparing to open a cosmetics business; along with past interns, Ogi and Xinlin. The guest was actress Kim Hyun-joo with the topic of urban life and conditions of living in general. The last part of the show was an on-site visit by Mondi, Lucky, Burgos and Xinlin to Tetto's hanok home in Bukchon Hanok Village.
114	"I Want To Solve Korea's Unsolved Crime"	September 5, 2016	N/A
Interns were again Xinlin and Ogi. There were two topics of "what is important"; the Eurojackpot, presented by Klabunde, and in general, government lotteries by country, and Canada's birth tourism, presented by Patry. The guest was Kyonggi University professor of criminal psychology Yi Su-jeong with a discussion about Korea's unsolved or cold criminal cases.
115	"I Want To Deliver Trustworthy News Only"	September 12, 2016	N/A
The intern was Libya's Amira (previously on Episode 111) and the first topic was the ban on the burkini and burqa. The guest was announcer and JTBC Newsroom anchor Ahn Na-kyung with the role of journalists and her desire to present truthful and accurate news. The discussion included her reporting of China's 'super bus' and later retracting the story after it was discovered to be an investor's publicity stunt.
116	"I Am Way Too Competitive"	September 19, 2016	N/A
The intern was Rigoberto Banta Jr., from the Philippines, who is in charge of education in an international organization in Korea; the topic was Duterts's war on drugs and whether the recent killings of about two thousand drug suspects is right or wrong. The guest was actor Oh Ji-ho whose topic was his competitive nature and always wanting to win; which included famous fights, in all the countries, among politicians and celebrities.
117	"I Think Most People Have Emotional Scars"	September 26, 2016	N/A
India's Lucky presented the first topic, the quality and pollution of drinking water in his country. Mazzucchelli said Switzerland had the best tap water, and further discussion included all public utilities and whether they should be government or privately run. The guest was Horan (singer), vocalist with Clazziquai, who discussed current day mental illness, from her experience as a radio DJ. Talks included her obsession with her cellphone, everyone's phobias, and awareness and treatment of mental illness.
118	"I Want To Be An Adult"	October 3, 2016	N/A
The first topic was the recent Kim Young-ran Act (or the Anti-Corruption and Bribery Prohibition Act) which placed monetary limits on meals, gifts and consolation received by Korean public officials, journalists and private school staff. The guest was the show's first minor, 17-year-old rapper and television personality MC Gree, and son of prior guest Kim Gura. His topic was wanting to become an adult quickly. The discussion included difficulties his age presents while socializing with his girlfriend, who is a year older; and cast remembrances of their transition into adulthood, and the pros and cons.
119	"I Am Sad People Don't Really Go To Theater"	October 10, 2016	N/A
Italy's Mondi raised the first topic about charitable donations beginning with August 2016 Central Italy earthquake relief and including celebrities and politicians donating for personal image gain. The second issue was brought up by Tetto, regarding Elon Musk's plan for the colonization of Mars. The guest was film, stage and TV actor Cho Jae-hyun who discussed his disappointment that people watch television shows and movies, but not theater. They also discussed each country's cultural heritage and most famous film festivals, several of which Cho has attended.
120	"I Think There's A Stereotype For A Family"	October 17, 2016	N/A
The show started with recognition of the date's United Nations International Day for the Eradication of Poverty. Japan's Ogi brought up the first topic, the "Wasabi Terror Incident"; a famous Osaka restaurant served tourists sushi with double amounts of wasabi, which critics had called discrimination. The topic continued about discrimination against tourists, dangerous product recalls, and whether the companies should be forgiven. The week's intern was Celeste David from the Philippines, a university student and bank employee who joined the weekly guest, actress Kim Jung-eun during the show's second half. Due to Kim's volunteer work with the Social Welfare Society, she presented the single mother topic. The discussion included non-traditional families and prejudices against them: same-sex marriage and legal adoption, polygamous, and multi-cultural families. David talked about Kopinos and Filipino children born from American soldiers.
121	"I Think I Can Forgive My Cheating Spouse Once"	October 24, 2016	N/A
The show announced United Nations Day; and Burgos introduced the first topic, mitochondrial donation, as the first "three-parent-baby" was born in Mexico. Talks included gene manipulation to create healthy babies, commercial surrogacy in India and other countries, and sperm banks. The week's topic was affairs, presented by actress Song Ji-hyo, who was currently starring in JTBC's drama My Wife's Having an Affair this Week. The discussion included how much infidelity would be acceptable, famous affairs and divorce rates by country, and separation etiquette.
122	"I Am Always Searching For Originals."	October 31, 2016	N/A
The show began with talk of Halloween, including the need for sensitivity to minorities and ethnic groups with its costumes, and the 2016 clown sightings. The "global side dishes" or "what is important" topic was presented by Patry - foreigners real estate investments in Canada, and talk included Chinese "explosive buying" globally, and whether governments' restrictions would be discrimination against the foreigners or protection of the citizens. The guest was Kangta, singer, DJ, entertainment company director and the second H.O.T. member to appear on the show; Tony An was previously on Episode 102. As an "original" or first generation Korean idol star, Kangta's topic was the value of original restaurants and products. The discussion included inventions of each country and the origin of football or soccer.
123	"I Have Collected Up To 1,800 Pairs Of Shoes."	November 7, 2016	N/A
The show first discussed the upcoming US presidential election, and presidential qualities. The "what is important" issue was marriage endowments or dowries from both bride and groom; also sharing of dating expenses. The guest was actor Park Hae-jin and a discussion of collections and hobbies. Park said his collection of over 1,800 pairs of shoes was due to being poor when he was young and enying a classmate's Nike Jordan shoes, which he could not afford.
124	"I Only Study Harder When The Exam Is Just Around The Corner."	November 14, 2016	N/A
The intern was Busan University of Foreign Studies political science professor Andrew, originally from the UK. He joined the special "emergency" talk, the 2016 United States presidential election results, stating that he had experienced the shocking election results of the Brexit. Discussion included Tetto's explanation of media election projections, protests against Donald Trump, and Burgos' neighboring countries' concerns, as well as each representative countries' perspectives. The second talk, with the show's cast only, was about the 2016 South Korean protests and other countries' historical protests. The guest, just three days before the CSAT, was Kang Sung-tae who runs a non-profit organization that mentors low-income students to take the national yearly exam. He said his nickname is 'MCE' or 'a Monster Created by Exams' and presented the topic of cramming or studying harder close to exam time.
125	"Sometimes Emotional Feelings Come Before Rational Decisions"	November 21, 2016	N/A
The "global side dish" talk was Black Friday, presented by Tetto, and whether it stimulates the economy, or promotes excessive consumption. Discussion included cross-border shopping and shopping tips, and Wang talked about happy memories shopping with his mother during China's equivalent day. The guest was the first doctor to appear on the show, Namkoong In, emergency physician and essayist. He discussed his experiences and talk included perceptions and stereotypes of medical professionals, best medical techniques, diseases, famous professionals, medical TV dramas, and medical malpractice. Tetto talked about the US's expertise in drug development, including Viagra and In explained its multiple uses, including altitude sickness.
126	"I Want To Be On Another Audition Show"	November 28, 2016	N/A
The intern was Sinasi Alpago, a journalist from Turkey, with the topic of pseudonyms or fake names. Talks included famous people who have used them like President Park Geun-hye's use of "Gil Ra-Im" a character in Secret Garden, and French President Nicolas Sarkozy's use of "Paul Bismuth" to buy a phone for private use. They also discussed unique names and name change. Guests were I.O.I members, China's Zhou Jieqiong and Jeon So-mi who has three nationalities, South Korean, Canadian and Dutch. Having become I.O.I members from the audition on Produce 101 they talked about doing it all over again; Zhou saying she would like to, and Jeon saying she would not. Jeon, the first place winner of the competition, discussed her relationship with second-place winner and I.O.I member Kim Se-jeong. Both discussed their agencies' policies on dating, after Ogi mentioned a dating scandal of an AKB48 member in Japan. And Zhou said she valued "fun" survival shows like Canada's Worst Driver that Patry talked about.
127	"I Want To Say Whatever I Want To Say"	December 5, 2016	N/A
The "global side dish" topic, presented by Tetto, was Bob Dylan's winning the Nobel Prize in Literature for his song lyrics, and his not appearing at the awards ceremony. Talks included the appropriateness of the award being given to a lyricist and the obligation to attend or not; along with stories of famous acceptance speeches from each country for awards ceremonies. The guest was voice actress and entertainer Seo Yu-ri who talked about her desire to express her opinions, and the problems it has caused her; including loss of work during her early career after saying the pay was too little. Members talked about celebrities giving political opinions and Ogi cited the example of Hayao Miyazaki's criticism of Japan's history during the Pacific War. While discussing the influence of educator's opinions, Seo said she was schooled by conservative teachers.
128	"I'm Curious To Open What Should Remain Closed"	December 12, 2016	N/A
The side issue was presented by Patry; after Fidel Castro's recent death Pierre Trudeau called him a legendary leader. The cast discussed whether country heads should give condolences, and whether governments should pay for memorials for past leaders. Guests were actors Moon Jeong-hee and Kim Nam-gil who starred together in a recent film Pandora. The topic was taboos, with Moon stating that she is curious to open the Pandora's box, and shared that as a rookie actress, many things were taboo. Kim talked about Korean buildings not having a fourth floor and Incheon International Airport not having gates 4 and 44 with the unlucky number. Cast discussed other taboos, such as the aversion to displaying the German flag and French flag, India's inter-caste marriage, and wearing the miniskirt in Mexico.
129	"It's More Comfortable To Live Alone"	December 19, 2016	N/A
There were two global side talks, the first a discussion of each countries' government hearing proceedings, with Tetto giving the example of Nannygate. The second talk was the effectiveness of tobacco packaging warning messages, including issues like smoking in apartments and private homes. The guest was R&B singer Lena Park with the topic of living as a single person. Park, who has lived alone for twenty years discussed ordering take-out meals, and storing food purchases in single servings in her freezer. Talks included advantages and disadvantages, traveling and entertaining oneself.
130	"I Keep Challenging Myself To Do More Difficult Jobs"	December 26, 2016	N/A
The first talk was about unusual airplane incidents, including unruly passengers, (due to celebrity Richard Marx's recent incident helping flight attendants restrain one on a Korean flight); fines and laws imposed. The second talk on Indian monetary reform was presented by Gupta and joined by intern Sinasi Alpago from Turkey, who also appeared on Episode 126. Actress Park Jin-joo presented the topic of extreme jobs and the job of the firefighter, as an example, with members discussing the profession's difficulties and salaries in their countries. Other jobs mentioned were Alaskan king crab fishing, AV idols, the geisha and dangerous industrial jobs; including the benefits of partial or full strikes by workers.
