= List of Non-Summit episodes (2014) =

- No. of episodes: 26

Release
- Original network: JTBC
- Original release: July 7 – December 29, 2014

Season chronology
- ← Previous; Season 2013 Next → 2015

Non-Summit (Korean: 비정상회담) is a South Korean talk-variety show, part of JTBC's Monday night lineup. The show aired from July 7, 2014 to December 4, 2017.

== Episodes ==
The show began with eleven foreign men cast as "Representatives" and three South Korean hosts. "Visiting interns" were incorporated into the cast, as regular members took vacations, and some left the show. The debate topics are presented by visiting South Korean guests.

No. in season	Title	Original release date	Rating
1	"Youth Without Borders"	July 7, 2014	N/A
Comedian Jang Dong-min was the first guest "representative" from Korea, on the show. He introduced the topic, whether young people should continue living at home, sometimes with a large extended family, or whether this was "abnormal" behavior, and they should be more independent, and live alone.
2	"Living Together Before Marriage"	July 14, 2014	N/A
Miss Korea 2010 winner Jung So-ra, and comedian Lee Guk-joo were the week's representatives. The topic was "pre-marital co-habitation of Korean youths."
3	"My Dream Comes Before Reality"	July 21, 2014	N/A
Pop music performer, Shin Hae-chul was the weekly representative. The topic was whether Korean young people should continue working towards a dream profession or career, or should settle for what the reality of life offered them, by way of jobs.
4	"I'm A Woman Who Doesn't Know Men"	July 28, 2014	N/A
Comedian Oh Na-mi and pop singer Soyou of Sistar were the representatives. Oh Nami presented the topic, saying that she had not dated for a number of years, and now found herself to be unfamiliar with "the dating game" and men in general. She posed, " Is it abnormal for a 31 year old to be unused to dating and men?" During the opening talk, host Yoo Se-yoon revealed that host Sung Si-kyung, had previously told him that he "prefers Soyou over Suzy of the girl group Miss A." And United Kingdom's foreign panelist, James Hooper, announced that he would be leaving the show before the next broadcast, as he was going to Australia to work on his PhD.
5	"I Think Education On Reproductive Organs Should Be Required In School"	August 4, 2014	N/A
Weekly Korean representatives were reggae artists Skull, aka Skul!, originally with Stony Skunk, and Haha, celebrity and comedian. The night's topic was whether sex education should be compulsory, like other courses, i.e. language, English, and math. New foreign panelist, Germany's Daniel Lindemann, joined the show, replacing James Hooper. Viewership was highest for this episode, so far, and rose to 4%.
6	"I Find It Difficult To Deal With People"	August 11, 2014	N/A
Comedian Jo Se-ho presented the topic, "My relationships are getting more complicated, am I abnormal?"
7	"I Feel Like Getting Married Is Homework I Need To Do"	August 18, 2014	N/A
Ahn Young-mi of SNL Korea, and actor Hong Seok-cheon, an openly gay celebrity, were Korea's representatives. Ahn presented the topic, "Marriage feels like homework, am I abnormal?"
8	"I Don't Want To Live In Seoul Anymore"	August 25, 2014	N/A
Guest representatives, music group Rose Motel's member Yook Joong-wan and Kang Joon-woo introduced the topic, living in Seoul, "Whether to continue living in Seoul, or give it up."
9	"I Say Yes To Everything My Son Wants"	September 1, 2014	N/A
Kim Gura, comedian and TV/Radio personality, presented the topic, "I gave my son everything he's ever wanted. I think he doesn't know enough about the world, and lacks motivation. I do everything my son wants, am I abnormal?"
10	"Chuseok special"	September 8, 2014	N/A
Comedian Sam Hammington joined the show for the Chuseok special, a "G 11 talent and arm wrestling showdown." Viewership ratings rose to the highest, at 6%.
11	"I Live To Prepare For A Job Interview"	September 15, 2014	N/A
Singer John Park, American Idol semi-finalist, and runner-up on Superstar K2 was the guest. American born, of Korean descent, he presented the topic of job application requirements, for instance, whether a photo or family history should be required. Enes Kaya was on vacation and a visiting "intern" representative, Egypt's Sami El-Baz, a Korean language student at Seoul National University, where Tyler Rasch also attends, substituted for him. Ratings jumped again, to the highest of 6.8%.
12	"I Panic When I Can't Get Online"	September 22, 2014	N/A
Jo Kwon of 2AM was the guest, presenting the topic of Internet and Smartphone usage and whether it is good vs. being addictive. Italy's Alberto Mondi was away, and replaced by another Italian, Alberto Lussana, a model and friend of Mondi's, who went to university with him in Italy and works at a beer company, where Mondi also used to work. Former representative James Hooper appeared in a video call during the show.
13	"I Spend All My Money On My Friends"	September 29, 2014	N/A
Comedian Yoo Sang-moo was the guest and the topic was spending money on friends. USA's Tyler Rasch was away and visiting intern representative Danny Arens, also from the USA, replaced him. Arens is cofounder of Seoul-based indie music collective Loose Union and a member of the group Used Cassettes.
14	"I Don't Care About Health"	October 6, 2014	N/A
Comedian Lee Yoon-suk, whose nickname is "national weak man", said that everyone thinks he would want to take good care of his health, but he is actually unconcerned with his health, and admits to "living recklessly", smoking 1 1/2 to 2 packages of cigarettes a day, drinking all night with friends and then recovering for days after, and preferring to eat pizza and ramen. He said, "I have absolutely no interest in my health, am I abnormal?" For the first time, in any of the episodes, for the vote of "normal" vs. "abnormal", all representatives voted "abnormal", both at the beginning and at the end of the show. The show included an exercise challenge with the show's cast and hosts.
15	"I Can't Choose Between My Career And My Children"	October 13, 2014	N/A
TV talk show host, Park Ji-yoon, married to talk show host Choi Dong-seok, with two children, was the guest. She presented the topic, "I can't give up work and I still want to raise my child well, am I abnormal?" The discussion was about raising children, working mothers and their dedication to family, stay-at-home parenting fathers, etc. The show included the representatives sharing their favorite cartoon heroes; and a "Dad parenting tournament" with storybook readings and changing diapers.
16	"I Want To Write Songs In Korean Only"	October 20, 2014	N/A
Chang Kiha, singer/songwriter/actor, of the indie group Kiha & The Faces, presented the topic: "I used to take the Korean language for granted, but when I heard Sanulrim, Song Gol Mae, and Deulgukhwa seonbae's song lyrics, I realized that our language was beautiful... Others tell me to try including English lyrics strategically, to enter the global market... Even if I can't enter the global market, I only want to write lyrics in our language." The show included a Guinness Book of World Records type challenge.
17	"I've Achieved My Goal, But I Am Not Happy"	October 27, 2014	N/A
Actor Kim Sung-kyun, who received attention for his couple's role with K-pop girl group Tiny-G's Do-hee, in the K-drama Reply 1994, was the guest. The topic was dreams and happiness. Japan's Takuya Terada was away, and replaced by Japanese "intern representative," Takeda Hiromitsu, an actor in Korean films, the latest The Admiral: Roaring Currents, directed by Kim Han-min. As part of the show's fun, Takeda gives a warning to Zhang Yuan that he will "avenge" his fellow countryman Terada, and being from Osaka, he has a different character. This was the last appearance for Australian Daniel Snoeks who returned to his studies in Australia. After the airing of this episode, the show made an apology on their Facebook page for the accidental misuse of Japanese background music during Takeda's appearance, which "song came to ascendancy as a symbol of Japanese imperialism," praising the Japanese Emperor of a certain era, and for which netizen's had complained. The show also apologized on their official webpage for using this song, Kimigayo, the national anthem of Japan, which had also been used on the first airing of the show, during Terada's introduction.
18	"I'm Too Scared Of Breaking Up To Begin A Relationship"	November 3, 2014	N/A
The guest representative was Gong Hyung-jin, actor and television host and the topic was the fear of breaking up and divorces. Daniel Snoeks empty seat was replaced by visiting intern Samer Samhoun, from Lebanon, who graduated from Hanyang University and attended KAIST for his MBA.
19	"I'm Too Lazy To Date"	November 10, 2014	N/A
Jang Yoon-ju, actress/singer/model and host of Korea's Next Top Model since 2010, was the guest representative and presented the topic of love and romance. The second visiting intern representative to replace Daniel Snoeks' vacated chair was Sam Lévano from Peru, a student at Seoul National University, who also performed on the show playing guitar with the blues group he's in, Shenanigans.
20	"I Feel Too Old To Meet And Interact With Younger People"	November 17, 2014	N/A
Eunhyuk and Kyuhyun of Super Junior were the guest representatives and introduced the topic, the generation gap and communication among juniors and seniors. Eunhyuk said, "We actually have a larger generation gap between our own group members than between us and junior singers;" and Kyuhyun stated that he feels a generation gap with Heechul, who is four years older, and in his 30s, citing their differences in music preferences as one example. The visiting intern was Ilya Belyakov from Russia who studied at Far Eastern Federal University and Yonsei University and started working at Samsung's global human resources department in 2010.
21	"I Want To Sever My Tie With My Siblings"	November 24, 2014	N/A
Kim Bum-soo, R&B and soul singer, was the guest representative, presenting the topic of "the bond of brothers." The visiting intern from Colombia was Álvaro Sánchez, a 2012 graduate of Hanyang University who works at SK Communications.
22	"I Want To Quit My Job Because Of Discrimination"	December 1, 2014	N/A
The guest representatives were Bobby Kim, Hip hop and R&B artist, born in Korea, and raised in the USA, and Sayuri Fujita, a Japanese celebrity on Korean variety shows, who debuted on Global Talk Show, also called "Chitchat of Beautiful Ladies", which Non-Summit has been compared to. The topic was sexism. Takuya Terada was away and the visiting intern was Blair Williams from Australia, a 23-year-old, and graduate of University of Queensland and Yonsei University.
23	"I Carry Around A Weapon For Self Protection"	December 8, 2014	N/A
Guest representatives were Super Junior's Kangin and Zhou Mi and the topic was crime and safety. Kangin told a personal funny story involving USA police chasing him after a concert, and pointing a gun at him while his pants were unzipped, due to a misunderstanding, and Zhou Mi detailed a scary time when his mother was mugged in China. Due to the Enes Kaya controversy, the show edited out much of his appearance on this episode, which had been pre-recorded, prior to his announcing that he was leaving the show.
24	"I Want To Quit My Job And Start My Own Business"	December 15, 2014	N/A
The guest representative was Lee Sang-min of Roo'ra or "Roots of Reggae," a South Korean hip hop and dance group first popular in the 90's. The topic was entrepreneurship. Lee said his group debuted in 1994, went bankrupt in 2002, and resumed broadcasting activities in 2012. The visiting intern was the U.S.'s Mark Tetto, a Princeton University graduate, formerly with Morgan Stanley and Samsung Electronics; and currently a Managing Partner at The Ventures Company in Seoul, and CFO at Vingle, a global social networking site. Tetto joked with fellow American Tyler Rasch, said his parents were originally from Italy, and played piano on the show.
25	"Christmas Special"	December 22, 2014	N/A
The Christmas episode included musical guests Yoon Min-soo and Ryu Jae-hyun and their R&B band Vibe. Christmas carols were sung by two groups of the representatives, one group who are in their 20s and the other group who are in their 30s; along with a performance by host Sung Si-kyung.
26	"Year-End Special"	December 29, 2014	N/A
The show was a roundup of highlights of the 2014 year's previous shows. The cast shared non-aired videos and stories as they looked back on prior episodes, and chose "best one-day Nonsummit member", "best scene" and "best quote."
