= Tongin Market =

Market in Seoul, South Korea

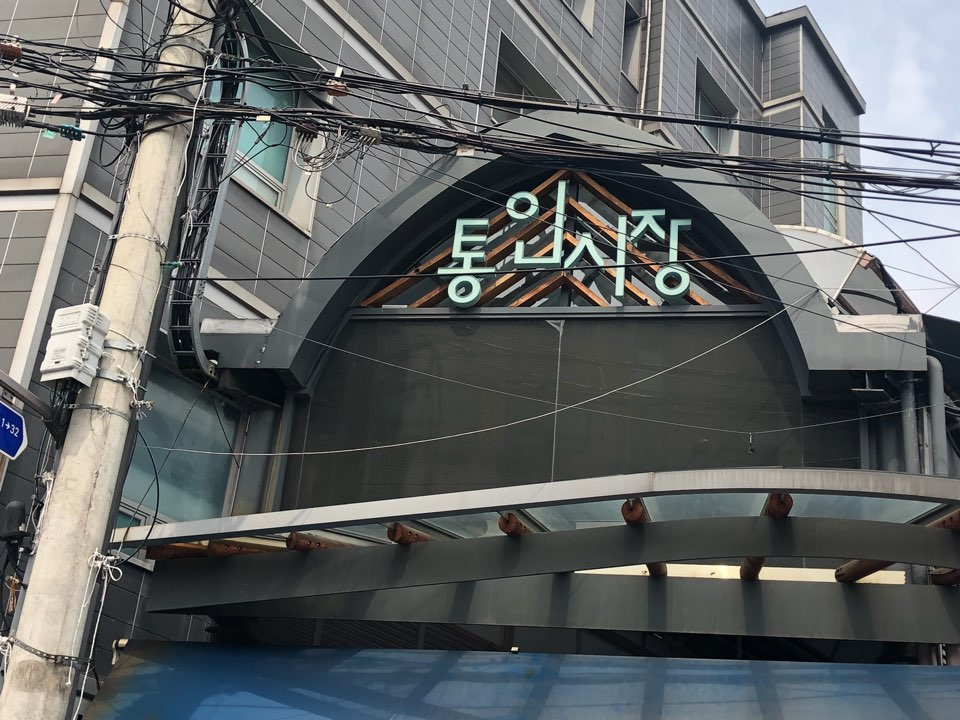
- Tongin Market (2018)
- Coordinates: 37°34′50.35″N 126°58′12.19″E
- Address: 18, Jahamun-ro 15-gil, Jongno-gu, Seoul, South Korea
- Website: tonginmarket.modoo.at (in Korean)

Korean name
- Hangul: 통인시장
- Hanja: 通仁市場
- RR: Tongin sijang
- MR: T'ongin sijang

Tongin Market (Korean: 통인시장) is a traditional market in Tongin-dong, Jongno District, Seoul, South Korea. Established in 1941, the market originally catered for local needs. Today it is home to around 75 businesses, including sit-down restaurants, street food stalls, and stores. The market is located at 18, Jahamun-ro 15-gil, Jongno-gu, Seoul.

== History ==
Tongin Market was built in 1941 as a market for the Japanese in the vicinity of Hyoja-dong and near the palace Gyeongbokgung, and after the Korean War, as the population grew in the Sogong area, the market expanded.

In 2005, it was registered as a legitimate market according to the special law for the promotion of the traditional market and then equipped with modernization facilities. In 2010, it was selected as the 'Seoul Culture Market' hosted by the governments of Seoul and Jongno District.

In 2011, the market started a rejuvenation programme that saw the introduction of yeopjeon brass coins as means of payment on the market. The number of stores is about 70 across food stalls and goods vendors. The programme resulted in growing visitor numbers and started to attract tourists.

== Gallery ==
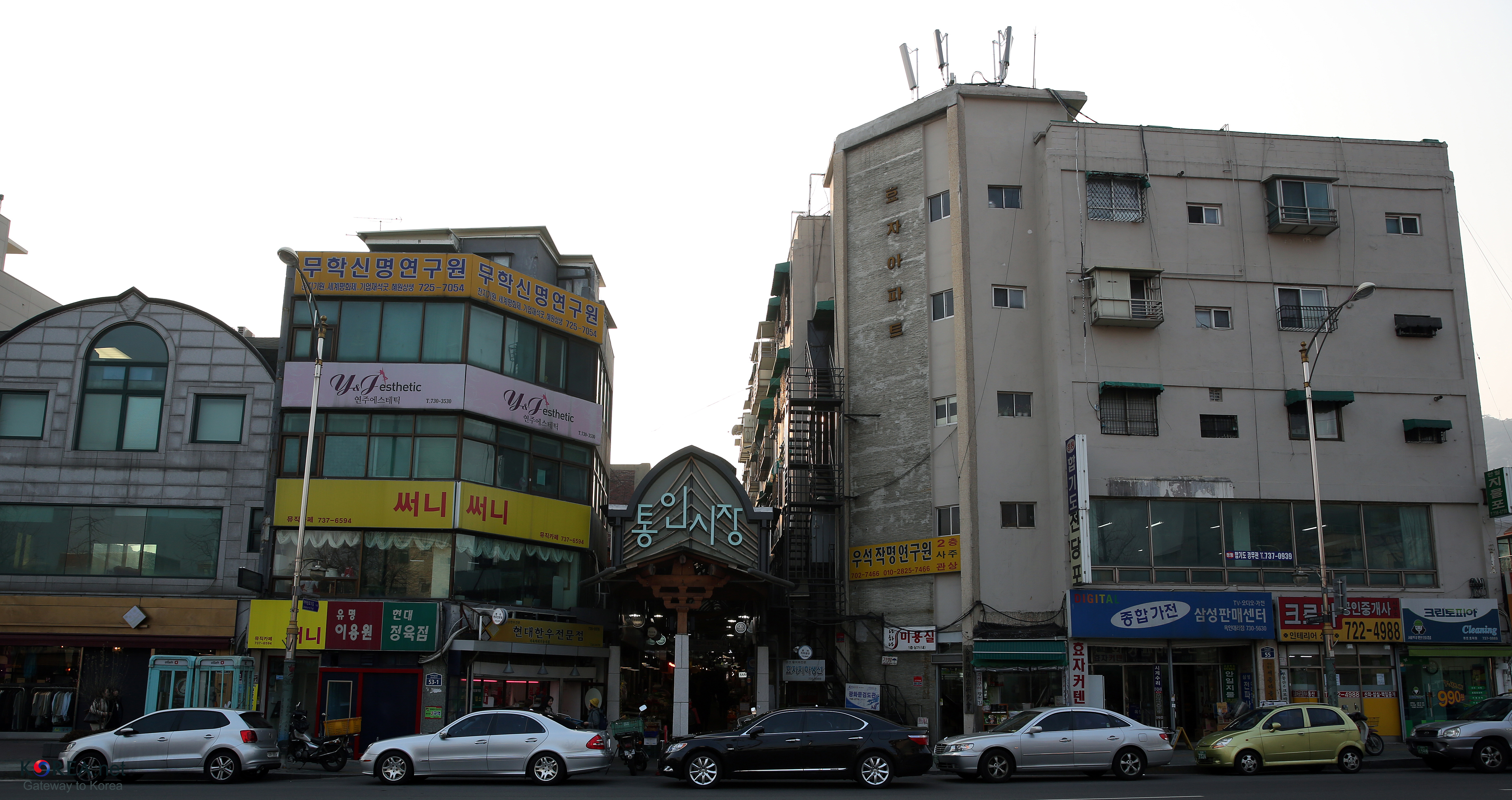
View from a distance (2014)

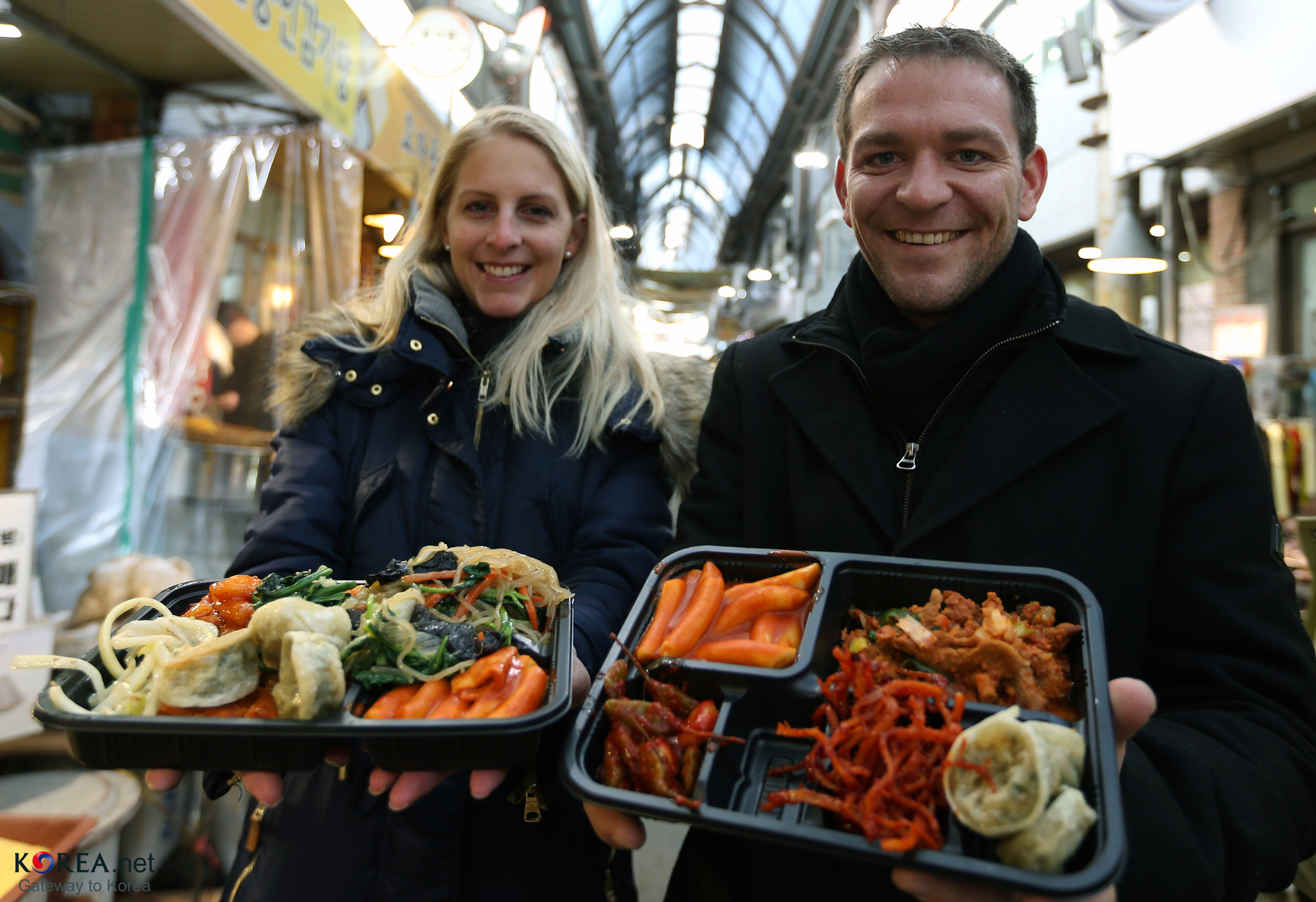
Two people with food purchased at the market (2014)

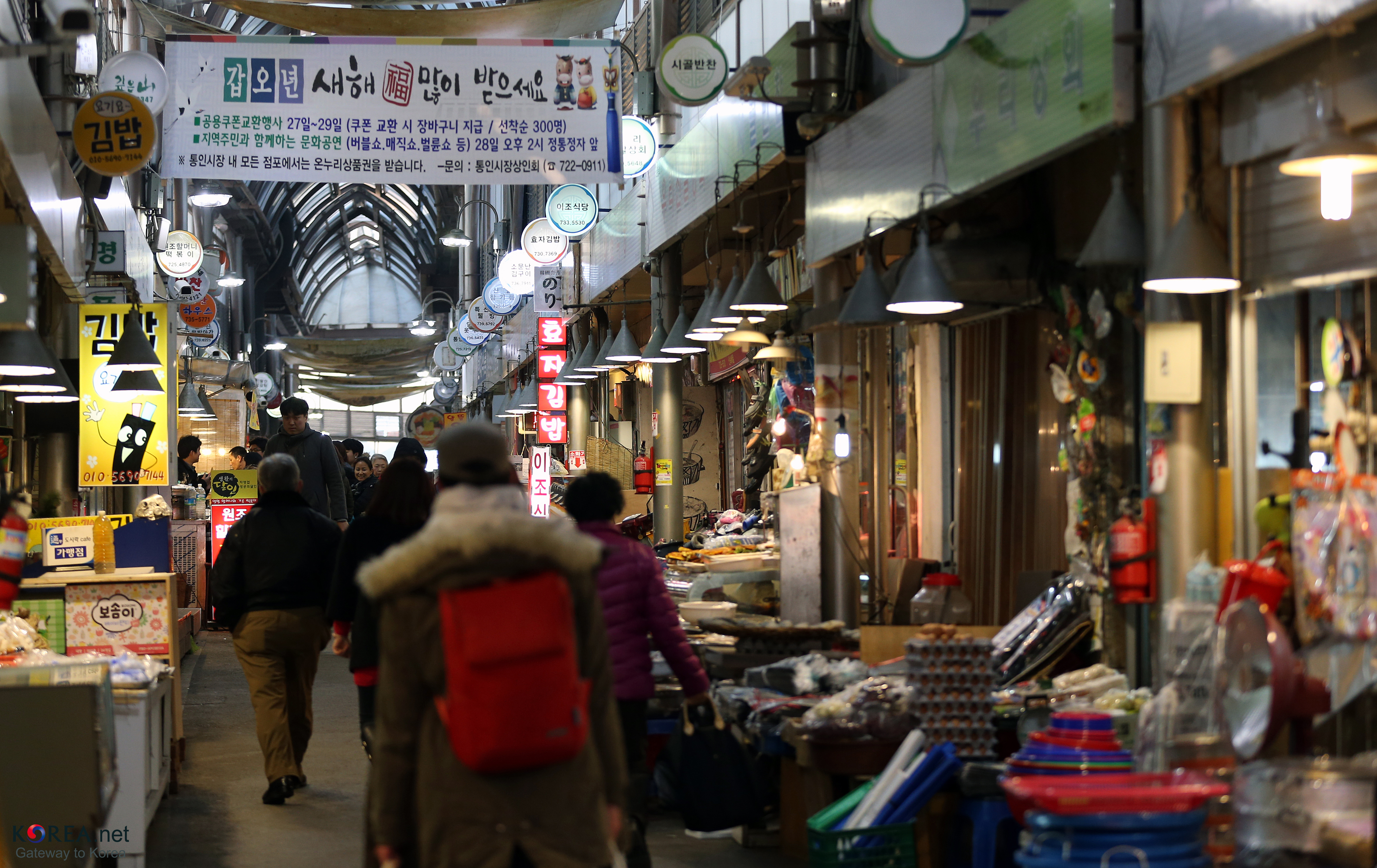
Interior of the market (2014)

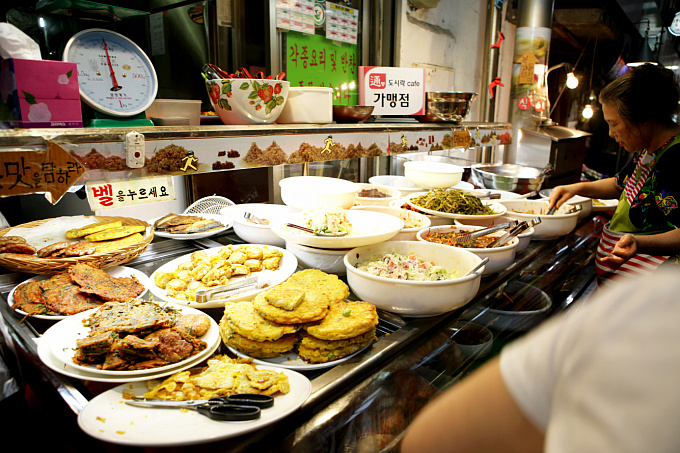
Food sold at the market (2015)
