= List of killings by law enforcement officers in the United States, July 2016 =

This is a list of people reported killed by non-military law enforcement officers in the United States in July 2016, whether in the line of duty or not, and regardless of reason or method. The listing documents the occurrence of a death, making no implications regarding wrongdoing or justification on the part of the person killed or officer involved. Killings are arranged by date of the incident that caused death. Different death dates, if known, are noted in the description. The table below lists 81 people.

== July 2016 ==
| Date | Name (age) of deceased | Race | Location | Description |
|---|---|---|---|---|
| 2016-07-31 | John Casey (32) | White | Phelps, Kentucky | An officer attempted to question Casey in connection with an assault. Casey allegedly threw a rock at the officer, who says he shot Casey when he saw him pull "something silver" from his pocket. Casey was carrying a can of beer. |
| 2016-07-31 | Mario Martinez Torres (38) | | Wapato, Washington | |
| 2016-07-29 | Dalvin Hollins (19) | | Tempe, Arizona | Dalvin Hollins was fatally wounded when a Tempe police officer fired his weapon during a foot pursuit of Hollins. No weapon was recovered. |
| 2016-07-29 | Amanda Bivens (40) | White | Homewood, Alabama | |
| 2016-07-29 | Melvin Faison (59) | White | Wapato, Washington | |
| 2016-07-28 | Donnell Thompson (27) | Black | Compton, California | Donnell Thompson, 27, died on July 28 after a deputy with the Los Angeles County Sheriff Department Special Enforcement Bureau shot him with a high-powered rifle from an armored car. Thompson was unarmed. |
| 2016-07-28 | Paul O'Neal (18) | Black | Chicago, Illinois | O'Neal was fatally shot by Chicago police after driving a stolen car, and was running away from officers into a neighborhood. Partial video of the footage was released on August 5. |
| 2016-07-28 | Jesus Rael (31) | Hispanic/Latino | Tucson, Arizona | |
| 2016-07-28 | Omar Gonzalez (36) | Hispanic/Latino | Los Angeles, California | |
| 2016-07-28 | Jeffrey Smith (47) | Black | La Quinta, California | |
| 2016-07-28 | Jorge Moreno-Aguirre (41) | | Sparks, Nevada | |
| 2016-07-27 | Dylan Liberti (24) | White | Arizona (Scottsdale) | Dylan Liberti was fatally wounded by Scottsdale police after he confronted them with a knife. |
| 2016-07-27 | Dalvin Hollins (19) | Black | Tempe, Arizona | |
| 2016-07-27 | Saddam Trejada-Campos (24) | | San Bernardino, California | |
| 2016-07-27 | Emil Mecklenburg (20) | | Malta, Montana | |
| 2016-07-27 | Michael Sean Adams (33) | White | Estill Springs, Tennessee | |
| 2016-07-26 | Devon Martes (17) | Black | Metairie, Louisiana | |
| 2016-07-26 | Juan Reynaldo Duran (36) | Hispanic/Latino | Artesia, New Mexico | |
| 2016-07-26 | Scot Minard (50) | White | Pine River, Wisconsin | |
| 2016-07-25 | Jeff Tyson (31) | Black | Indianapolis, Indiana | |
| 2016-07-24 | Richard Risher (18) | Black | Los Angeles, California | |
| 2016-07-24 | Robert Lourenco (36) | | Winchester, California | |
| 2016-07-24 | Alvin Sylversmythe (29) | Native American / Alaskan | Gallup, New Mexico | |
| 2016-07-23 | Bernard Wells (31) | | Chino, California | |
| 2016-07-23 | Steven Longoria (34) | | San Antonio, Texas | |
| 2016-07-23 | Austin Howard (49) | | Milwaukee, Wisconsin | |
| 2016-07-21 | BJ Medeiros (36) | | Keaau, Hawaii | |
| 2016-07-21 | Derek Love (50) | | Illinois (Chicago) | |
| 2016-07-21 | Paul Yacabitis (50) | | West Virginia (Buckhannon) | |
| 2016-07-20 | Javier Gaona (31) | | California (Santa Maria) | |
| 2016-07-18 | Jerry L. Brimer (56) | White | Oklahoma (Tulsa) | |
| 2016-07-17 | James Stuart (39) | | Waterbury, Connecticut | Stuart was shot and killed by an off-duty officer in a murder-suicide. |
| 2016-07-17 | Gavin Eugene Long (29) | Black | Baton Rouge, Louisiana | Long was shot dead after the 2016 shooting of Baton Rouge police officers, which he committed. |
| 2016-07-17 | Jermaine Johnson (42) | Black | New York (Brooklyn) | |
| 2016-07-17 | Michael Ramsey (43) | White | Oklahoma (Tulsa) | |
| 2016-07-17 | Kevin Higgins (37) | | Wisconsin (Sheboygan) | |
| 2016-07-16 | Cody Jarrett (26) | White | California (San Bernardino) | |
| 2016-07-16 | Billy Smith (31) | | Florida (Green Cove Springs) | |
| 2016-07-16 | Patrick Fennell (57) | White | New Jersey (Little Egg Harbor Township) | |
| 2016-07-15 | Bobby Horne (63) | White | North Carolina (Peachland) | |
| 2016-07-14 | Isaiah Soehngen (18) | Black | Indiana (Marion) | |
| 2016-07-14 | Dayten Harper (33) | Black | Maryland (Baltimore) | |
| 2016-07-13 | Donald Myers (32) | White | Arizona (Flagstaff) | |
| 2016-07-13 | Richard Dinneny (56) | White | New York (Middletown) | Dinneny was at his house and armed with a pellet gun and threatened to shoot himself and others. Police fired on him. |
| 2016-07-12 | Benjamin Zekovic (23) | White | Alaska (Anchorage) | |
| 2016-07-11 | Orville Edwards (39) | Black | New York (New York) | Police responded to a home invasion and shot Edwards, who was allegedly armed with a revolver. |
| 2016-07-11 | Pablo Medina (41) | | Michigan (Romulus) | Police were involved in a stand-off at a hotel with Medina, who allegedly killed his wife and another person. Medina pointed a gun at police, who shot at him. |
| 2016-07-11 | Jason Brooks (41) | Black | Illinois (East St. Louis) | Brooks was reportedly shooting at cars and bystanders, and Illinois State Police responded to the scene, and shot him. |
| 2016-07-11 | Joseph Mann (50) | Black | California (Sacramento) | Two Sacramento police officers attempted to run over a mentally ill homeless man with their car less than 35 seconds before they shot and killed him |
| 2016-07-11 | Larry Darnell Gordon (44) | White | Michigan (St. Joseph) | Gordon was shot and killed by courthouse officers after attempting to escape custody. |
| 2016-07-09 | Tyler Gebhard (20) | Black | Missouri (St. Louis) | Gebhard was shot by an off-duty police officer while allegedly attempting to break into the officer's residence. |
| 2016-07-09 | Alva Braziel (37) | Black | Texas (Houston) | Braziel was allegedly armed with a gun when he was shot by Houston Police. A security video camera shows footage of Braziel firing a handgun in the air, and then dropping it the floor, and raising his hands in the air as police arrive. |
| 2016-07-09 | Andre Johnson (40) | Black | Oklahoma (Broken Bow) | |
| 2016-07-08 | Abraham Smith (30) | White | Arizona (Tucson) | Smith was allegedly lunging at police with a knife when they were called to his home. |
| 2016-07-08 | Micah Xavier Johnson (25) | Black | Dallas, Texas | Johnson was killed by a robot strapped with C-4 during a standoff with the Dallas Police in the aftermath of a mass shooting perpetrated by him. |
| 2016-07-07 | Vinson Lee Ramos (30) | | California (Bell) | Ramos was arguing with a woman at a convenience store, prompting a 911 call. Police arrived at the scene, and Ramos advanced towards police with a knife and was shot. |
| 2016-07-07 | Adam Smith (38) | | California (Clovis) | Adam Smith was shot and killed by Clovis police July 7 as they attempted to serve warrants, including at least one felony arrest warrant. Officers fired at Smith as he drove his vehicle toward them in an attempt to escape. |
| 2016-07-07 | Earnest Fells (62) | | Alabama (Selma) | |
| 2016-07-06 | Unnamed person | | California (Covina) | |
| 2016-07-06 | Philando Castile (32) | Black | Minnesota (Falcon Heights) | Castile was shot during a routine traffic stop for a broken tail light. |
| 2016-07-06 | Kenyatta Moorehead (36) | Black | Mississippii (Raymond) | |
| 2016-07-06 | Thomas Vandemark (65) | | Oklahoma (Rush Springs) | |
| 2016-07-05 | Alton Sterling(37) | Black | Louisiana (Baton Rouge) | Sterling was shot dead by police after an altercation with police that was recorded on a cell phone. |
| 2016-07-05 | Melissa Ventura (24) | White | Arizona (Yuma) | |
| 2016-07-05 | Sam Newby (49) | White | California (Temecula) | |
| 2016-07-05 | William Arnette (65) | | Georgia (Hiram) | |
| 2016-07-05 | Joshua Bolster (29) | White | Oregon (Salem) | |
| 2016-07-04 | unnamed | | Texas (Rosser) | A man was shot by police after stabbing several people and waving a knife at police. |
| 2016-07-04 | Pedro Villanueva (19) | Hispanic/Latino | California (Fullerton) | A man involved in illegal street racing was shot dead by an undercover police detective while his front-seat passenger was injured. |
| 2016-07-04 | Delrawn Small (37) | Black | New York (New York City) | Shot and killed in Brooklyn NY. An NYPD officer was found not guilty in 2017 of second-degree murder and first-degree manslaughter after he was accused of fatally shooting Small in an apparent case of road rage. |
| 2016-07-04 | Anthony Nunez (18) | Hispanic/Latino | California (San Jose) | |
| 2016-07-04 | Sidney Washington (21) | | Washington, D.C. | |
| 2016-07-04 | William Patterson (34) | White | South Carolina (North Charleston) | |
| 2016-07-03 | Shannon Labit (40) | | Louisiana (New Iberia) | |
| 2016-07-03 | Raul Saavedra-Vargas (24) | Hispanic/Latino | Nevada (Reno) | |
| 2016-07-02 | Jonathan Justice (50) | | Tennessee (Bristol) | |
| 2016-07-02 | Valenzuela, Vincent | | California (Anaheim) | Valenzuela died after being placed in a chokehold by Anaheim police. Unsuccessful revival attempts were made. |
| 2016-07-02 | Jai Lateef “Jerry” Williams (35) | Black | North Carolina (Asheville) | Asheville Police Sgt. Tyler Radford shot Williams after pursuing his vehicle to the Deaverview Apartments. |
| 2016-07-01 | Steven McQueen (30) | | Georgia (Cartersville) | |
| 2016-07-01 | Alexis Mishtowt (63) | | South Carolina (Landrum) | |
| 2016-07-01 | Helmut Wihowski (57) | | Wisconsin (Jackson) | |
