= Chin Jung-kwon =

South Korean literary critic (born 1963)

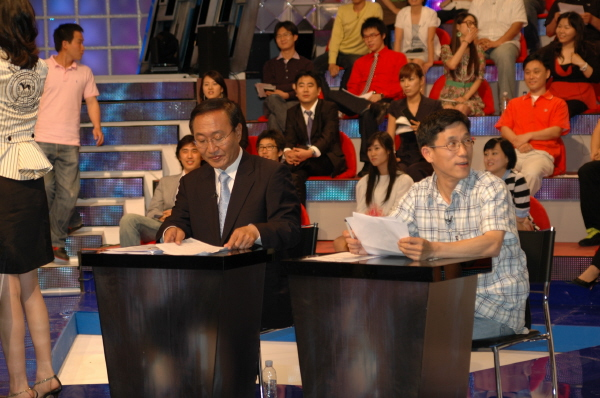
- Born: April 27, 1963 (age 63); Seoul, South Korea
- Education: Seoul National University (BA); Seoul National University (MA); Free University of Berlin
- Occupations: Aesthetician, critic, professor
- Political party: Justice Party (South Korea)
- Spouse: Miwa Kyoko

Korean name
- Hangul: 진중권
- Hanja: 陳重權
- RR: Jin Junggwon
- MR: Chin Chunggwŏn

Chin Jung-kwon (Korean: 진중권; born April 27, 1963) is a South Korean aesthetician, critic, and professor.

== Life and career ==
He was born at Gonghang-dong, Yeongdeungpo District, Seoul (presently Gonghang-dong, Gangseo-gu). He has three siblings, two older sisters, and one younger brother. His second oldest sister, Unsuk Chin is well known as contemporary classical composer. In 1982 he entered the School of Aesthetics at Seoul National University, and graduated in 1986. He studied Philosophy of Language in Free University of Berlin. He came back to Korea and started to work as a visiting professor in Korea National University of Arts and adjunct professor in Chung-ang University.

He wrote a book series called <Aesthetics Odyssey> between 1994 and 2004. It is estimated that the series sold almost 800,000 copies.

From 2022 he is working as special professor in Kwangwoon University.

== See also ==
- Yoon Suk Yeol
