= Tongin-dong =

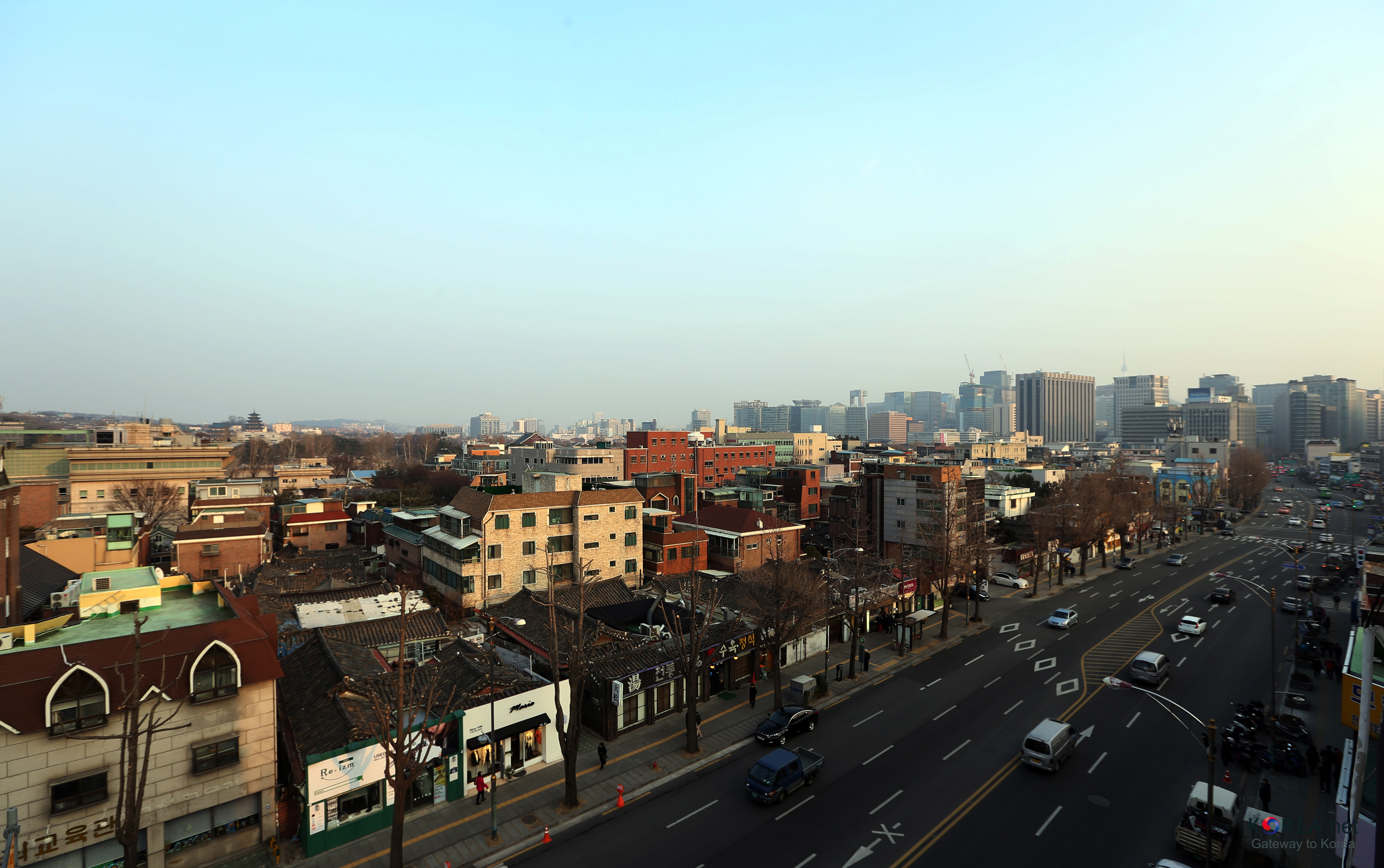
- Interactive map of Tongin-dong
- Country: South Korea

Area
  - Total: 0.05 km^{2} (0.019 sq mi)

Korean name
- Hangul: 통인동
- Hanja: 通仁洞
- RR: Tongin-dong
- MR: T'ongin-dong

Tongin-dong (Korean: 통인동) is a dong (neighbourhood) of Jongno District, Seoul, South Korea. It is a legal dong (법정동 法定洞) administered under its administrative dong (행정동 行政洞), Hyoja-dong.

Tongin Market in Tongin-dong is on the Seoul list of Asia's 10 greatest street food cities for the tteokbokki.

The famed Korean king Sejong the Great was born in this area; during that time, the area was called Junsubang (준수방). There is a small placard dedicated to Sejong on a main street in this area. The house of writer Yi Sang is also in the area.

== See also ==
- Administrative divisions of South Korea
