= Awutu =

Awutu may refer to:

- Awutu language
- A region of Ghana, included in
  - Awutu/Effutu/Senya District
  - Awutu Senya East (municipal district)
  - Awutu Senya West (district)
  - Awutu-Senya (Ghana parliament constituency)
