= Hanna Tetteh =

Ghanaian politician (born 1967)

The Honourable Hanna Serwaa Tetteh
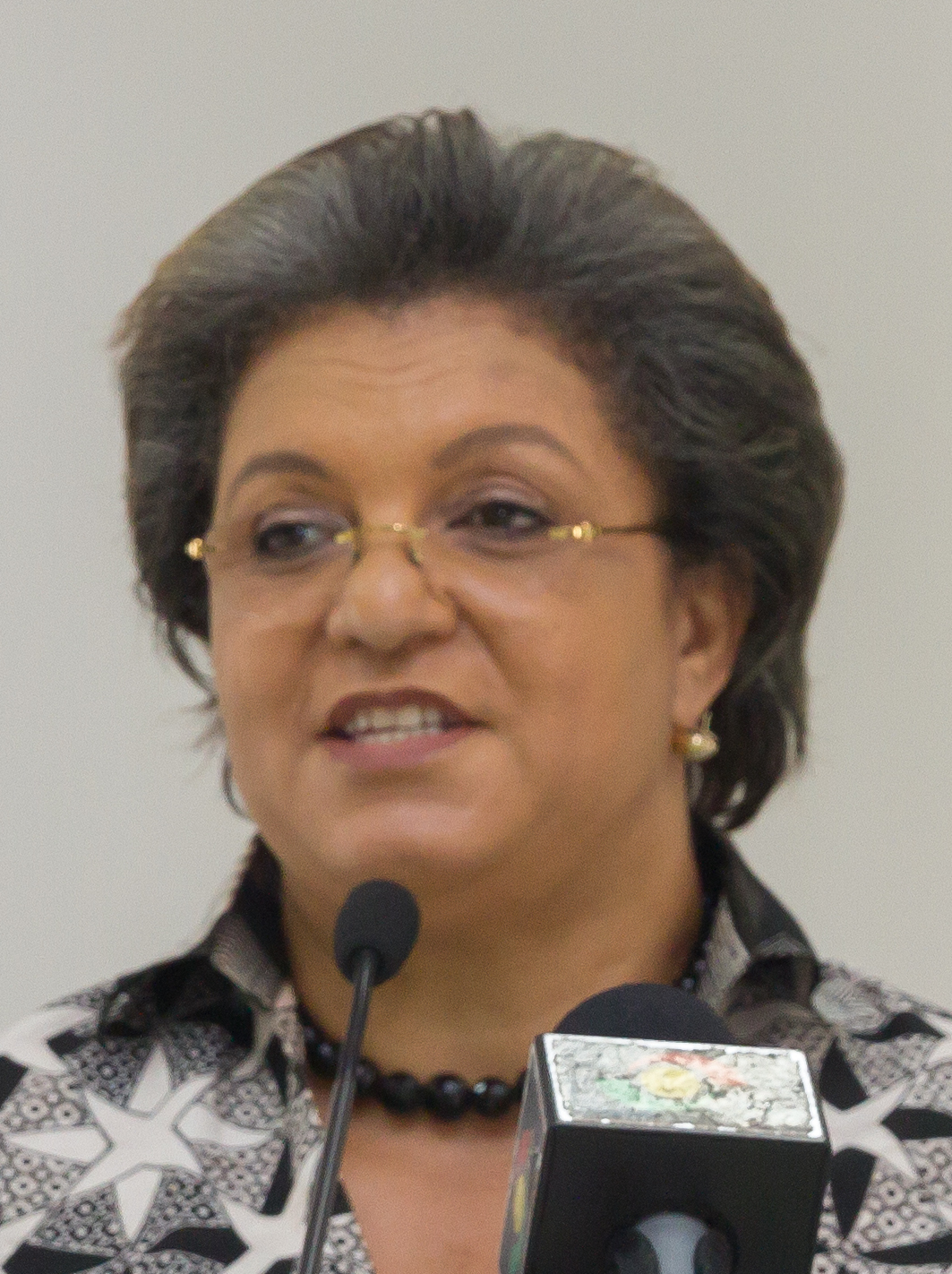

Member of the Ghana Parliament for Awutu Senya West MP for Awutu-Senya
- In office 7 January 2013 – 7 January 2017
- Preceded by: New constituency
- Succeeded by: George Andah

United Nations Special Envoy for the Horn of Africa
- Incumbent
- Assumed office 22 February 2024

28th Minister for Foreign Affairs
- In office 30 January 2013 – 7 January 2017
- President: John Dramani Mahama
- Preceded by: Muhammad Mumuni
- Succeeded by: Shirley Ayorkor Botchway

Minister for Trade and Industry
- In office January 2009 – January 2013
- President: John Atta Mills; John Mahama
- Preceded by: Papa Owusu-Ankomah
- Succeeded by: Haruna Iddrisu

Member of Ghana Parliament for Awutu-Senya
- In office 7 January 2001 – 7 January 2005
- Preceded by: Babalami Abu-Sadat
- Succeeded by: Oppey Abbey

Personal details
- Born: 31 May 1967 (age 59) Szeged, Hungary
- Party: National Democratic Congress
- Relations: Gizella Tetteh Agbotui (sister)
- Education: University of Ghana
- Profession: Barrister

Hanna Serwaa Tetteh (born 31 May 1967) is a Ghanaian barrister, diplomat and politician who has been serving as the UN Secretary General's Special Representative for Libya and as Head of the United Nations Support Mission in Libya (UNSMIL) since 2025.

Earlier in her career, Tetteh served in the cabinet of Ghana as Minister for Trade and Industry from 2009 to 2013 and Minister for Foreign Affairs from 2013 to 2017. She was also the Member of Parliament for the Awutu-Senya West constituency.

== Early life and education ==
Tetteh was born in Szeged, Hungary, to a Ghanaian father and Hungarian mother. Her secondary education was at Wesley Girls' High School, Cape Coast, in the Central Region of Ghana, from 1978 to 1985. Between 1986 and 1989, she studied law at the University of Ghana, where she obtained the Bachelor of Law (LL.B) degree. She then attended the Ghana School of Law, becoming a barrister-at-law in 1992.

== Early career ==
Tetteh did her National Service as a Legal Officer with the International Federation of Women Lawyers (FIDA) from 1992 to 1993. After completing her National Service, she worked in Private legal practice with the Law firm Ansa-Asare and Company, of Hencil Chambers in Accra, Ghana.

After two years of private legal practice, Tetteh joined the Commission on Human Rights and Administrative Justice as a Legal Officer, but later that same year, she joined the Ghana Agro Food Company (GAFCO) as a Legal Adviser; GAFCO was a food processing company that produced wheat flour, poultry and animal feed, fish meal and canned tuna. The company also marketed other food and veterinary products and was located in the Tema Harbour Area in Tema she held other management positions in the company namely Human Resources and Legal Services Manager and thereafter Deputy General Manager (Finance and Administration Manager until she went into politics in 2000. After serving a term in Parliament, she did not immediately contest for re-election and re-joined GAFCO as General Manager (Corporate, Administration and Legal) where she worked until December 2009.

== Political career ==
=== Career in national politics ===
Hanna Tetteh won the Awutu Senya constituency seat in the December 2000 parliamentary election and served for one term as a National Democratic Congress Member of Parliament on the opposition benches. She did not contest her seat in the next election. She was elected as a National Executive Member of the National Democratic Congress in 2005. In 2008 she was appointed as National Communications Director of the NDC, replacing John Dramani Mahama, who had become the vice-presidential candidate of the NDC and running mate of John Atta Mills, the party's presidential candidate.

At the 2008 presidential campaign, she played a role in managing the party's communication strategy for that election which made her a more prominent political figure and she became one of the main spokespersons for the NDC.

=== Minister of Trade and Industry, 2009–2013 ===
After the NDC victory in the 2008 elections, Tetteh became the Spokesperson for the newly elected Government while the process of making new appointments was ongoing and in February 2009, President John Atta Mills nominated her for the position of Minister of Trade and Industry. Following her confirmation by Parliament, she took over the portfolio and held the position of Minister of Trade and Industry from February 2009 to January 2013.

During her tenure as Minister of Trade and Industry, she was also a member of the Government's economic management team, a member of the board of the Millennium Development Authority responsible for the oversight of the implementation of the first Millennium Challenge Corporation Compact in Ghana. She also served on the National Development Planning Commission, and was the Chairperson of the Ghana Free Zones Board (GFZB).

=== Back to Parliament, 2013–2017 ===
When John Mahama succeeded the deceased President Atta Mills in 2012, he also appointed Tetteh as the Communications Director for his 2012 election campaign. She also decided to contest for a parliamentary seat once again and was elected to the newly created Awutu Senya West constituency seat in the December 2012 election after serving as member of parliament for Awutu Senya Constituency from 2001 to 2005.

She won the seat after getting 23,032 votes representing 55.47% against his closest contender Oppey Abbey also a former Member of Parliament for Awutu Senya Constituency who got 18,487 votes representing 44.53%.

She lost the seat to George Andah in the 2016 parliamentary election who got 28,867 votes, 52.27% against her 25,664 votes representing 46.87%.

=== Minister of Foreign Affairs, 2013–2017 ===
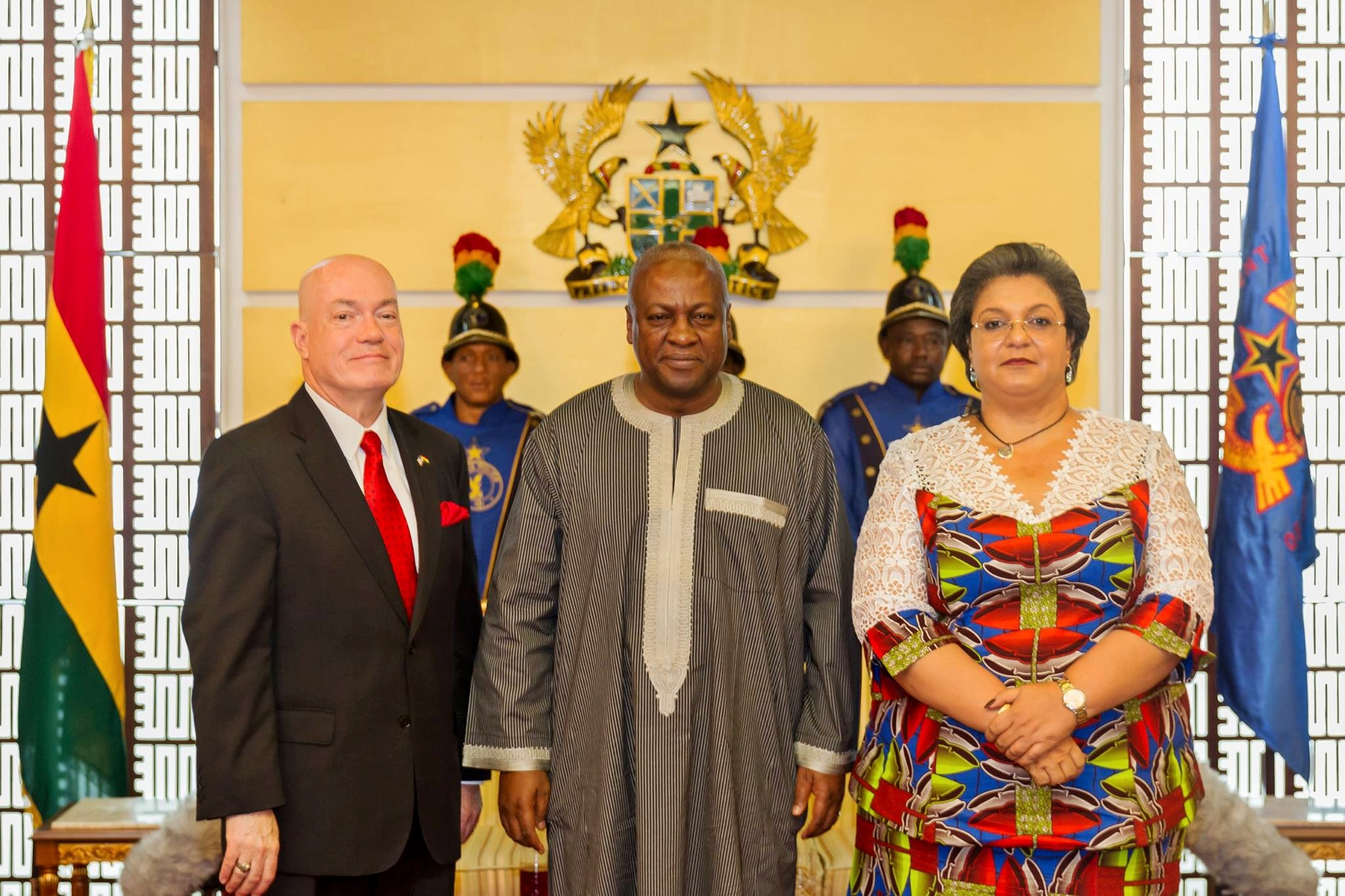
Hanna Tetteh with John Mahama and Robert Porter Jackson in 2016 when she was Foreign Affairs Minister of Ghana.

Following the elections, Tetteh was nominated by President Mahama as Minister for Foreign Affairs and appointed as such in January 2013 after parliamentary approval. While serving as Minister for Foreign Affairs, she was also a member of the National Security Council and the Armed Forces Council.

When President Mahama became the chairman of the Authority of ECOWAS Heads of State and Government in March 2014, Tetteh became the chairperson of the ECOWAS Council of Ministers at the same time.

After leaving her office in 2017, Tetteh was as Richard von Weizsäcker Fellow at Robert Bosch Foundation. From 2017 until 2018, she served as a Co-Facilitator in the IGAD-led High-Level Forum for the Revitalisation of the Agreement for the resolution of the conflict in South Sudan.

=== Career with the United Nations, 2018–present ===
In 2018, United Nations Secretary-General António Guterres appointed Tetteh as Director-General of the United Nations Office at Nairobi (UNON), succeeding Sahle-Work Zewde. Shortly after, she again succeeded Zewde, this time as Special Representative to the African Union and Head of the United Nations Office to the African Union (UNOAU).

Following the resignation of Ghassan Salamé as head of the United Nations Support Mission in Libya (UNSMIL) in 2020, Guterres suggested Tetteh as his successor; instead, the role went to Ján Kubiš.

In 2022, Guterres appointed Tetteh as his Special Envoy for the Horn of Africa, thereby switching positions with Parfait Onanga-Anyanga. In 2025, she succeeded Abdoulaye Bathily as the Secretary General's Special Representative for Libya and as Head of the United Nations Support Mission in Libya (UNSMIL).

== Personal life ==
Tetteh is the sister of Gizella Tetteh Agbotui, a member of parliament for the Awutu Senya West Constituency where she also served as member of parliament and Gabriella Tetteh, who also serves as the Central Regional Communication Officer for the NDC.

== See also ==
- List of Mills government ministers
- Awutu-Senya constituency
- List of foreign ministers in 2017

Parliament of Ghana
Preceded by Babalami Abu-Sadat	Member of Parliament for Awutu Senya; 2001 – 2005	Succeeded by Oppey Abbey
New title	Member of Parliament for Awutu Senya West; 2013 – 2017	Succeeded by George Andah
Political offices
Preceded by Papa Owusu Ankomah	Minister for Trade and Industry; 2009 – 2013	Succeeded by Haruna Iddrisu
Preceded by Muhammad Mumuni	Minister for Foreign Affairs; 30 January 2013 – 7 January 2017	Succeeded by Shirley Ayorkor Botchway
