= Bonsuoko =

Community in Central Region, Ghana

- Town
- Country: Ghana
- Region: Central Region
- District: Awutu Senya West District

Population
  - Total: —
- Time zone: GMT
  - Summer (DST): GMT

Bonsuoko is a community near Senya Breku in the Awutu Senya West District in the Central Region of Ghana. The Bonsouko Rainbow Stars are located in Bonsuoko. Vegetables such as tomatoes are cultivated in Bonsuoko.
