= Mavis Hawa Koomson =

Ghanaian politician and educationist

Hon. Mavis Hawa Koomson MP
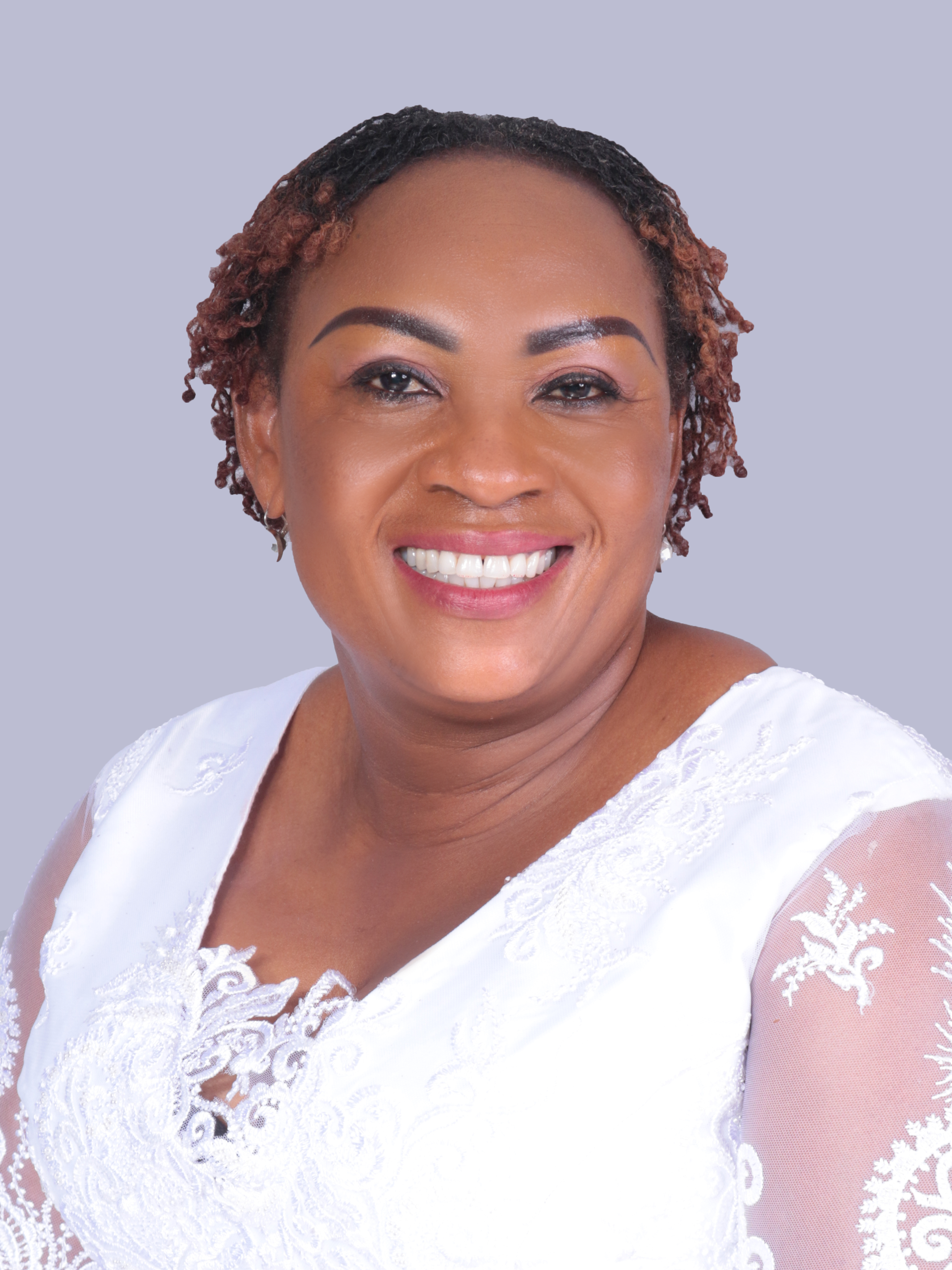

Member of the Ghana Parliament for Awutu-Senya East
- Incumbent
- Assumed office 7 January 2012

Minister for Special Development
- In office February 2017 – January 2021
- President: Nana Akuffo-Addo

Minister for Fisheries and Aquaculture Development
- Incumbent
- Assumed office 2021
- President: Nana Akuffo-Addo

Personal details
- Born: 3 February 1966 (age 60) Salaga, Ghana
- Party: New Patriotic Party
- Children: 3
- Education: University Education Winneba, Ghana Institute of Management and Public Administration
- Occupation: Politician
- Profession: Educationist
- Committees: Business Committee

Mavis Hawa Koomson (born 3 February 1966) is a Ghanaian politician and educationist who served as a member of the sixth, seventh and eighth Parliaments of the fourth republic of Ghana, representing the Awutu Senya East Constituency in the Central region on the ticket of the New Patriotic party (NPP). She was appointed by President of Ghana Nana Akuffo-Addo on 10 January 2017 as minister of Special Development Initiatives. Koomson advocates for women's empowerment, education, and healthcare. She has also been involved in initiatives to promote fisheries and aquaculture development in Ghana.

== Early life and education ==
Koomson hails from Salaga in the Savannah Region of Ghana and was born on 3 February 1966.

She had her training college education at the Bimbilla Training College. She holds a diploma and a bachelor's degree in Basic Education from the University Education Winneba. She earned a master's degree, postgraduate diploma in public administration (CPA) and postgraduate diploma in public administration (DPA) from Ghana Institute of Management and Public Administration.

== Career ==
Koomson was a teacher by profession, occupying various positions including head teacher, assistant superintendent and principal superintendent. She was also president of Gender Unit of the Ghana National Association of Teachers Ladies Association (GNATLAS) Sekondi local, treasurer for GNATLAS (Western Region) and secretary for GNATLAS (Takoradi local).

== Politics ==
Koomson is a member of the New Patriotic Party. She is a former member of Parliament for Awutu Senya East Constituency in the Central Region of Ghana.

=== Cabinet minister ===
In May 2017, President Nana Akufo-Addo named Koomson as part of nineteen ministers who would form his cabinet. The names of the 19 ministers were submitted to the Parliament of Ghana and announced by the Speaker of the House, Rt. Hon. Prof. Mike Ocquaye. As a cabinet minister, Koomson is part of the inner circle of the president and is to aid in key decision-making activities in the country. She was appointed as the minister for Fisheries and Aquaculture Development in 2021.

=== 2020 elections ===
In the 2020 Ghanaian general elections, Koomson won the Awutu Senya East Constituency parliamentary seat with 57,114 votes making 52.6% of the total votes cast whilst the NDC parliamentary candidate Phillis Naa Koryoo Okunor had 51,561 votes making 47.5% of the total votes cast, the GUM parliamentary candidate Hanson Ishmael Amuzu had 0 votes making 0.0% of the total votes cast, the CPP parliamentary candidate Addy Ishmael had 0 votes making 0.0% of the total votes cast, the GCPP parliamentary candidate Peter Kwao Lartey had 0 votes making 0.0% of the total votes cast and the UPP parliamentary candidate Mohammed Issah Al-Marzuque had 0 votes making 0.0% of the total votes cast.

=== 2024 elections ===
In the 2024 Ghanaian general elections, Koomson lost to the NDC Parliamentary candidate for the Awutu Senya East Constituency, Phyllis Naa Koryoo Okunor, who secured 50,886 votes, representing 52.7%, while Koomson garnered 45,638 votes, representing 47.3%.

=== Committee ===
Koomson is a member of the Business Committee.

== Controversy ==
In July 2020, Koomson breached security laws and fired gunshots into a crowd of citizens who were in the process of registering for the controversial voters ID card. This incident occurred in Kasoa. Koomson claimed she was informed of foreigners who had come from different towns to register in her constituency. She regarded this as a threat to her party's victory in the upcoming elections. She claimed that the act was in self-defense because she felt threatened. She responded to the invitation of the CID of the police in the Central region. Her gun was retrieved by the Central Regional police. The license covering the weapon was also retrieved when she reported to the police in Cape Coast.

== Personal life ==
Koomson is a Christian, and is married with three children.

== Philanthropy ==
Koomson introduced an annual soccer competition dubbed the Kasoa MP's Cup among the youth in her constituency.

In 2021, she constructed a church hall for the Bethel Methodist Church in Kasoa.
