= Harona Esseku =

Ghanaian politician (1934–2022)

Chairman of the New Patriotic Party
- In office 2001–2005
- Preceded by: Samuel Odoi-Sykes
- Succeeded by: Peter Mac Manu

Chairman of the Central Region branch of New Patriotic Party
- In office 2001–2001

Vice Chairman of the Central Region branch of New Patriotic Party
- In office 1996–2001

Minister for Transport and Communications
- In office 1969–1971
- Prime Minister: Kofi Abrefa Busia
- Preceded by: J. Matthew Poku
- Succeeded by: Jatoe Kaleo

Member of Parliament for Awutu-Effutu-Senya Constituency
- In office 1969–1972

Personal details
- Born: 8 August 1934 Krobonshie, Senya Beraku
- Died: 3 August 2022 (aged 87)
- Citizenship: Ghanaian
- Party: New Patriotic Party (1992 - 2022)
- Other political affiliations: Progress Party (1969 - 1972); Popular Front Party (1979 -1981)
- Education: Accra Academy; Kumasi College of Technology
- Alma mater: University of Ghana
- Known for: New Patriotic Party Founding member

Harona Esseku (8 August 1934 – 3 August 2022) was a Ghanaian politician who served as Ghana's Minister for Transport and Communications from 1969 to 1971. He was approved as a cabinet minister at an age of thirty-five making him the youngest cabinet member of the Second Republic. In the Fourth Republic, he became a founding member of the New Patriotic Party and was National Chairman of the party from 2001 to 2005.

== Early years ==
Harona Esseku was born on August 14, 1934, in Krobonshie, Senya Beraku, in the Central Region. He had his primary education at Senya Beraku Oma School from 1941 to 1949 and went on to the Accra Academy, where he obtained his Cambridge school certificate in 1953. He attended the Kumasi College of Technology from 1954 to 1955. He taught chemistry and geography at his alma mater, Accra Academy after Kumasi and in 1958 he worked as a higher executive officer in the office of the Government Statistician.

In 1959, he entered the University of Ghana and read an undergraduate degree course in economics obtained in 1962 on Texaco scholarship. While at university, he was a pioneering student resident of Third Hall (renamed Commonwealth) and became the first student to be elected as president of the Commonwealth Hall Junior Common Room (JCR) at the end of his first year. In his final year, he was president of the Students' Representative Council (SRC) and also president of the International Association of Students in Science and Economics (AIESEC).

== Career ==
In 1962, he was employed by Pioneer Tobacco Company (British American Tobacco Ghana) as an executive trainee. He worked in the marketing department as a sales promotion manager for the Brong Ahafo and the then Northern Region. He took several foreign trips on sponsored trainings and was the advertising manager of Pioneer Tobacco by 1967.

Esseku also started his own business, which has operated in transport, distribution and commerce. He also has interests in fishing and farming.

== Political career ==
=== Second Republic political career (1968-1972) ===
Esseku was secretary to the Senya Beraku Development Association from 1965 to 1968, and Secretary to the Council of Youth Associations covering the three traditional areas of Winneba, Awutu and Senya.

In 1968, he was elected by the Awutus, Effutus, Gomoas and Agonas to represent them in the constituent assembly as the representative of the Winneba Administrative District for the drafting of the constitution of the second republic.

Though an early enthusiast of the Third Force, he joined the Progress Party in 1969 and became one of its leading members. In the parliamentary elections that took place on 29 August that year, Harona Esseku was elected as a member of parliament for Awutu-Effutu-Senya Constituency.

At thirty-five years, Harona Esseku became the youngest cabinet minister in the Busia government, with responsibility for the Ministry of Transport and Communications. He lost his ministerial position in a cabinet reshuffle in April 1971.

=== Third Republic political career (1979 -1981) ===
At the onset of the third republic, he became a founding member of the Popular Front Party (PFP) and later a member of the steering committee of the party. However, he and other former Progress Party leaders were barred from public office in the Third Republic due to adverse findings against them by a committee after the fall of the Second Republic. Their collective petition to have their ban overturned through a court hearing failed.

=== Fourth Republic political career (1992-) ===
In 1992, he was a founding member of the New Patriotic Party (NPP) as one of 110 persons who appended their signature to the first party documents filed to the electoral commission.

Esseku was secretary to the national disciplinary committee of the NPP from 1995 to 1998. He was a member of the national council of the NPP from 1995. He was vice chairman of the Central Regional branch of the party from 1996 to 2001, the party's representative to the Inter-Party Committee (IPAC) and the chairman of the NPP electoral commission.

Esseku was deputy chairman of the national campaign committee of the party for the 2000 general elections.

In August 2001, he became chair of the New Patriotic Party with 348 votes as against 61 votes and 22 votes obtained by Samuel Duah Addai and Mohammed Musah respectively. He took over as chair from Samuel Odoi-Sykes and was aged 67 at this takeover. He was chair of the New Patriotic Party until December 2005. He was replaced by Peter Mac Manu as chair of the party.

== Personal life and death ==
Esseku was married to Janet Esseku, a Ghanaian broadcaster who worked with the Ghana Broadcasting Corporation. He died on 3 August 2022, at the age of 87.

== Honours ==
Harona Esseku was a beneficiary of the member of the Order of the Star of Ghana award, conferred on him by the then president John Agyekum Kufuor in 2007.

== See also ==
- Minister for Communications (Ghana)
- Busia government
- Awutu-Senya (Ghana parliament constituency)
- Gomoa-Awutu-Effutu-Senya District
