= Oppey Abbey =

Ghanaian politician (1945–2019)

Member of Ghana Parliament for Awutu-Senya
- In office 7 January 2005 – 6 January 2009
- President: John Agyekum Kufour
- Preceded by: Hanna Tetteh
- Succeeded by: David Nana Larbie

Personal details
- Born: 5 November 1945 Senya, Central Region, Ghana Gold Coast (now Ghana)
- Died: 22 February 2019 (aged 73)
- Party: New Patriotic Party
- Education: Kwame Nkrumah University of Science and Technology
- Occupation: Politician
- Profession: Engineer

Oppey Abbey (November 5, 1945 – February 22, 2019) was a Ghanaian politician and a member of the Fourth Parliament of the Fourth Republic representing the Awutu-Senya Constituency in the Central Region of Ghana.

== Early life and education ==
Abbey was born in Awutu Senya West in the Central Region of Ghana on November 5, 1945. He obtained a Diploma in the Kwame Nkrumah University of Science and Technology after he studied engineering.

== Career ==
Abbey, a mechanical engineer was the former MP for Awutu-Senya, and was the first to win the seat on the ticket of the New Patriotic Party (NPP) in 2004 and made his entrance into Parliament on the January 7, 2005.

== Politics ==
Abbey was first elected into Parliament during the December 2005 Ghanaian General Elections on the Ticket of the New Patriotic Party as a member of Parliament for the Awutu-Senya Constituency with 32,539 votes out of the 64,740 valid votes casts representing 50.30%. He was defeated by David Nana Larbie of the National Democratic Congress in 2008.

He served on the Foreign Affairs and Business Committees of Parliament.

== Personal life ==
Abbey was a Christian. He died on February 22, 2019.
