= George Andah =

Ghanaian politician (born 1970)

Hon. George Andah MP
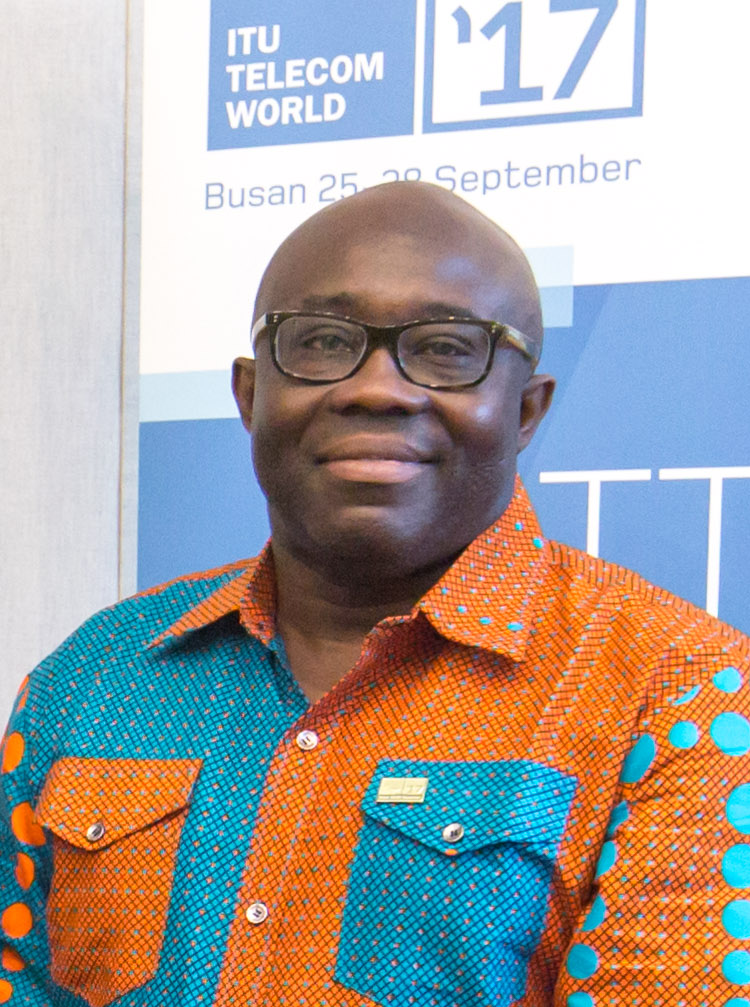

Deputy Minister for Communications
- In office February 2017 – January 2021
- President: Nana Akuffo-Addo
- Preceded by: Felix Kwakye Ofosu
- Succeeded by: Ama Pomaa Boateng

Member of Ghanaian Parliament Awutu Senya West
- In office January 2017 – January 2021
- Preceded by: Hanna Serwaa Tetteh
- Succeeded by: Gizella Tetteh Agbotui

Personal details
- Born: George Nenyi Kojo Andah Senya Beraku, Ghana
- Party: New Patriotic Party
- Children: 4
- Education: Achimota School, KNUST, University of Ghana Business School
- Occupation: Politician
- Profession: Marketing director

George Nenyi Kojo Andah (born 27 April 1970) is a Ghanaian politician and a former Member of Parliament for the Awutu Senya West Constituency in the Central Region of Ghana. He is a member of the New Patriotic Party and was the Deputy Minister for communications in Ghana.

In June 2021, he was installed as the Akyempim Odefey (Chief) of the Senya Beraku Traditional Area and goes by the stool name, Nenyi Kobena Andakwei VI.

== Early life and education ==
George was born on 27 April 1970 and hails from Senya Beraku in the Central Region of Ghana. He had his secondary education at Achimota School and proceeded to KNUST where he studied for a bachelor's degree in Biochemistry. George also holds an MBA degree in marketing from the University of Ghana Business School.

== Career ==
George has worked for several reputable companies; from being the marketing director of Guinness Ghana Breweries Ltd to being the Chief Marketing Officer for Scancom Limited. He was a member of the MTN Group to being the Chief Marketing Officer of Bharti Airtel Nigeria, a member of the Bharti Group to Chief Operating Officer (Country Manager) of Glo Mobile Ghana to the Regional Director, Marketing Promotions, Globacom (Nigeria, Ghana and Benin). He then went on to establish his own company called, RUDDER Solutions, a Ghanaian-based market-development management consultancy service. He also worked at the Accra main branch of SG-SSB from March 2001 to April 2002. He was also the Member of Parliament for the Awutu Senya West Constituency in the 7th Parliament of the 4th Republic and the Deputy Minister for Communications.

== Awards and recognition ==
- Received the CIMG Marketing man of the year in 2008.
- He was installed as a Chief
- He won Humanitarian MP of the year award 2019
- He received the United Clergy International Association (UCIA) 2019
- He was honored as the MTN Mobile Money Builder Award in 2019.

== Politics ==
George is a founding member of Occupy Ghana a political pressure group. He was also the New Patriotic Party parliamentarian for Awutu-Senya West constituency.

In June, 2020 he was elected by the delegates of the NPP to represent Awutu-Senya West Constituency in the 2020 Ghanaian general election as their parliamentary candidate. He lost his parliamentary seat to Gizella Tetteh-Agbotui of the National Democratic Congress. He is a former Deputy Minister for Communications.

In April 2022, he launched his book called 'Determined to do more'.

== Personal life ==
George is married with four children and lives in Accra with his family. He is a Christian.

== Philanthropy ==
In April 2019, George presented about 12 executive chairs to the Department of Marketing and Entrepreneurship at the University of Ghana Business School.
