= Kasoa Polyclinic =

Public health facility located in Kasoa

Kasoa Polyclinic is a public health facility located in Kasoa, in the Awutu Senya East Municipal District in the Central region of Ghana.

== Services ==
The facility offers a range of healthcare services. These include:

- General outpatient services
- Maternal and child health care
- Preventive and basic curative services

== Infrastructure challenge ==
The facility serves about 300,000 population. In 2019 an 80-bed polyclinic was constructed at Kasoa CP to expand healthcare capacity. However, the population continues to rely on the 40-bed capacity of the Kosoa polyclinic, catering to both male and female, including maternity wards. The polyclinic has no pediatric ward as of 2025 Concerns have been raised by the residents of the Walantu community in the Central Business Area of Kasoa about the poor liquid waste management practices of the polyclinic, which have led to the discharge of untreated waste into their surroundings.
