= Gizella Tetteh-Agbotui =

Ghanaian architect and politician

Hon. Gizella Tetteh-Agbotui MP
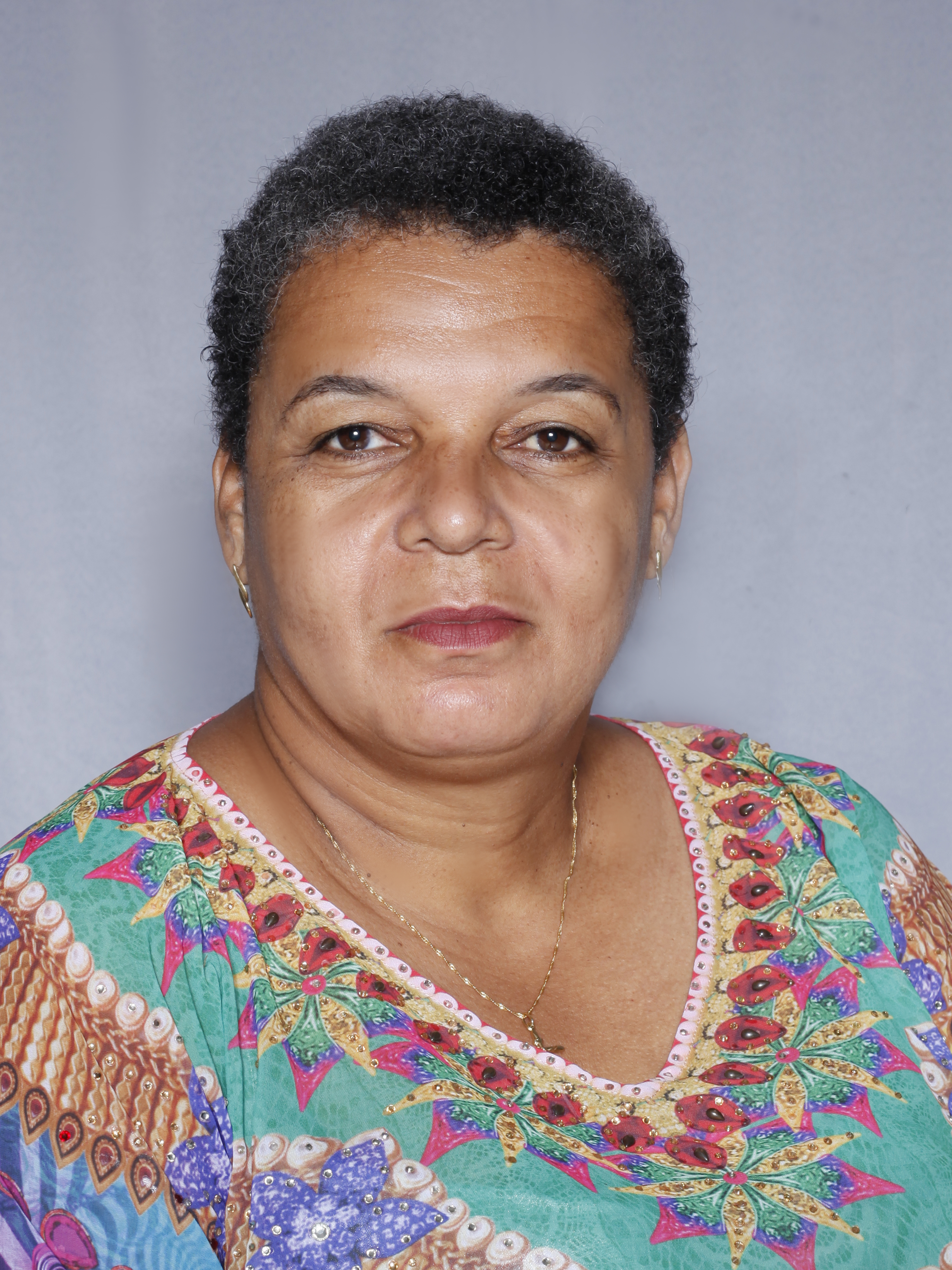

Member of Parliament for Awutu-Senya West Constituency
- Incumbent
- Assumed office 7 January 2021
- Preceded by: George Andah

Personal details
- Born: 30 November 1970 (age 55) Awutu Obrachire, Ghana
- Party: National Democratic Congress
- Relations: Hanna Serwaa Tetteh (Sister)
- Education: Kwame Nkrumah University of Science and Technology
- Occupation: Architect
- Profession: Politician
- Committees: Works and Housing Committee; Appointments Committee

Gizella Akushika Tetteh-Agbotui is a Ghanaian architect and politician. She contested in the 2020 Ghanaian General Election and won the parliamentary seat for the Awutu Senya West Constituency.

== Early life and education ==
Agbotui was born on 30 November 1970 and hails from Awutu Obrachire in the Central Region of Ghana. She had her bachelor's degree in Design in Architecture in 1997. She further had her master's degree in Business Administration in Marketing in 2007. She also had a certified PMP in Project Management in 2008. She also had her International Airport Professional in Airport Management in 2017.

== Politics ==
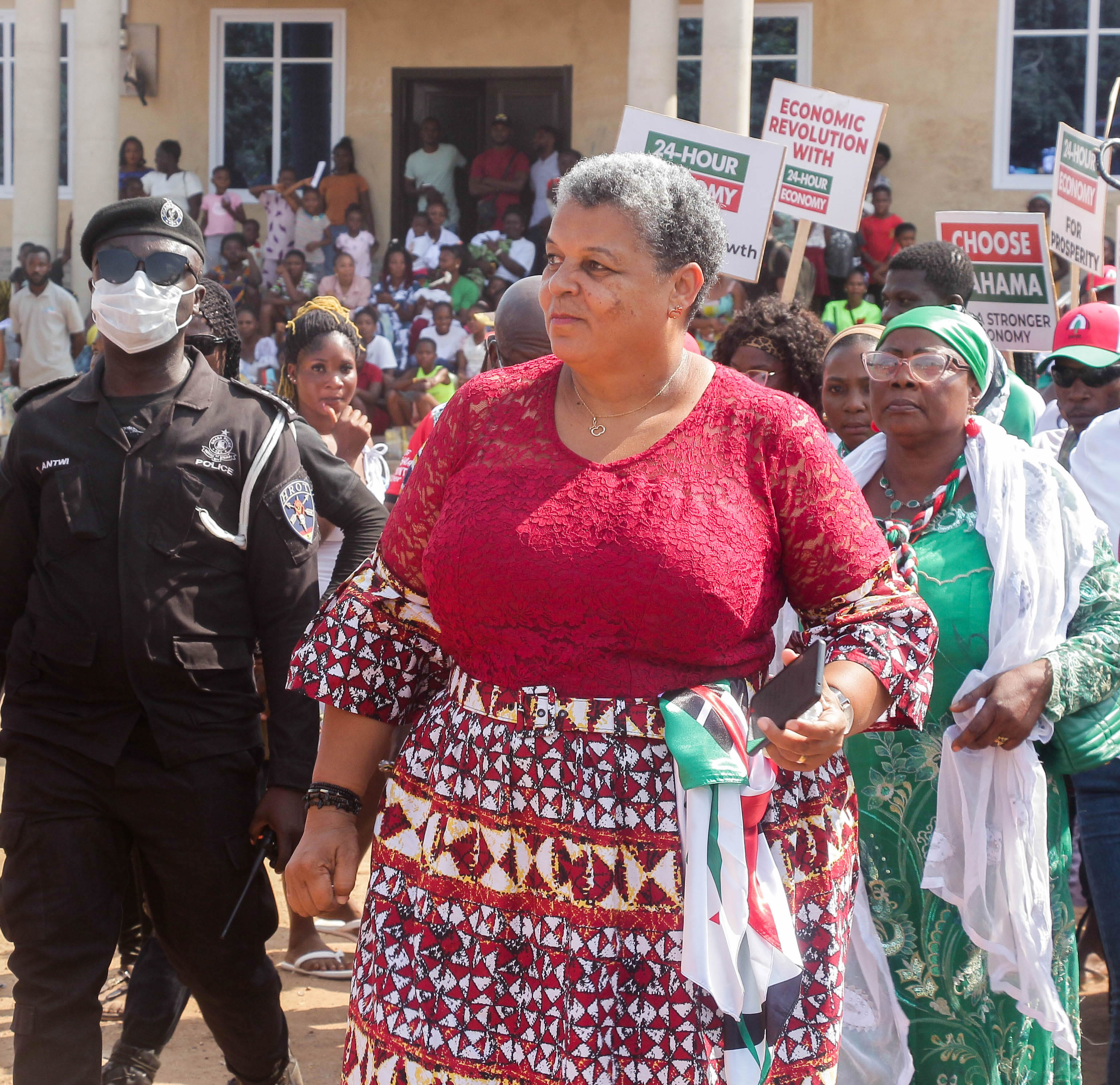
Tetteh-Agbotui in 2024, during a campaign rally

Agbotui is a member of the National Democratic Congress. In December 2020, she was elected member of Parliament for Awutu Senya West Constituency after she competed in the 2020 Ghanaian General Election under the ticket of the National Democratic Congress and won. She pulled 32,708 votes which represents 51.58% of the total votes cast. She was elected over George Andah of the New Patriotic Party, Edith Mansah Dzonyrah of the Ghana Union Movement and Samuel Yawson of the Conventions People's Party. These obtained 29,832, 678 and 193 votes respectively out of the total valid votes cast. These were equivalent to 47.05%, 1.07% and 0.30% respectively of total valid votes cast.

In the December 2024 elections, Agbotui was re-elected with 33,995 votes compared to those of her opponent, Eugene Arhin, who received 26,937 votes.

=== Committees ===
Agbotui is a member of the Works and Housing Committee and also a member of the Appointments Committee.

== Career ==
Tetteh-Agbotui is the CEO/ Principal Consultant of Zella Architects, an architectural firm in Ghana. She is an astute Consulting Architect with over 21 years’ experience in the Construction sector; an International Airport Professional (IAP) and a certified Project Management Professional (PMP).

== Personal life ==
Agbotui is the sister of Hannah Tetteh who served as member of parliament for Awutu Senya West Constituency and Minister for Foreign Affairs. She is a Methodist.

== Philanthropy ==
In 2021, she sponsored a 3-day program where more than 200 unlicensed drivers and motorists were trained, regularized and issued with licenses in her project dubbed GTA Licensing Project.

== Honor ==
In 2021, she was honored with a citation for her contribution to women empowerment in Ghana during the Under 30 Women Awards.
