= Awubia Festival =

Festival in Ghana by the people of Awutu Bereku

Awubia Festival is an annual festival celebrated by the chiefs and people of Awutu Traditional Area in Awutu Bereku in the Central Region of Ghana. The town is in the Awutu Senya district. It is usually celebrated in the month of August through to September. The festival is also known as Awutu Awubia Festival.

== Celebrations ==
During the festival, visitors are welcomed to share food and drinks. The people put on traditional clothes and there is durbar of chiefs. There is also dancing and drumming.

== Significance ==
This festival is celebrated to mark an event that took place in the past. It promotes healthy agricultural competition among the people and unites them. It also signifies the end of the farming season and the harvest period of the agriculture produce. It is also claimed it is celebrated in memory of the dead.
