= Bawjiase Polyclinic =

Ghanaian medical facility

- Ministry of Health

Geography
- Location: Awutu Bawjiase, Awutu Senya District, Central Region, Ghana

Organisation
- Care system: Ghana Health Service / NHIS Accredited
- Type: Polyclinic

Services
- Emergency department: Yes

History
- Founded: 1972

Links
- Website: www.united4health.org/partners
- Lists: Hospitals in Ghana

Bawjiase Polyclinic, located in the Central Region of Ghana, provides essential healthcare services to Bawjiase and nearby communities in the Awutu Senya District.

== History ==
The facility was established in 1972 through the efforts of Haruna Esseku, in collaboration with traditional authorities, to meet the healthcare needs of the surrounding communities.

The facility currently serves the residents of Bawjiase and 80 other settlements in the Awutu Senya District and beyond, providing healthcare to approximately 33,000 people in the Central Region and parts of the Greater Accra Region.

Akosua Agyeiwaa Owusu-Sarpong, the Central Regional Health Director, commended the Bawjiase Polyclinic for its excellent performance, earning it the title of Best Polyclinic in the Region for two straight years (2020/2021).

MTN Ghana Foundation constructed an Accident and Emergency block to the clinic. The block serves as a significant enhancement to the existing facility featuring essential amenities such as operating theatre, emergency ward, isolation ward, recovery ward, conference room, nurses’ area and resuscitation point.
