= Awutu-Senya (Ghana parliament constituency) =

Constituency in Ghana

- constituency for the Parliament of Ghana
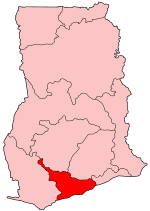
- District: Awutu/Effutu/Senya District
- Region: Central Region of Ghana

Current constituency
- Party: National Democratic Congress

Awutu-Senya is one of the constituencies represented in the Parliament of Ghana. It elects one Member of Parliament (MP) by the first past the post system of election. Awutu-Senya is located in the Awutu/Effutu/Senya district of the Central Region of Ghana. Leading into the 2012 elections the constituency was divided into two Awutu-Senya East and Awutu-Senya West.

== Boundaries ==
The seat is located entirely within the Awutu/Effutu/Senya district of the Central Region of Ghana.

== Members of Parliament ==
Election	Member	Party
1992	Danny William Osardu	National Democratic Congress
1996	Babalami Abu-Sadat	National Democratic Congress
2000	Hanna Tetteh	National Democratic Congress
2004	Oppey Abbey	New Patriotic Party
2008	David Nana Larbie	National Democratic Congress

== Elections ==
2008 Ghanaian parliamentary election: Awutu-Senya Source:Electoral Commission of Ghana
Party	Candidate	Votes	%	±%
National Democratic Congress	David Nana Larbie	25,666	49.6	20.6
New Patriotic Party	Oppey Abbey	23,329	45.1	−5.2
Independent	Haroon Tetteh Mensah	1,062	2.1	—
Convention People's Party	Richard Paa-Tawia	985	1.9	1.0
Democratic Freedom Party	Rev. Kofi Akotua-Obeng	689	1.3	—
Majority		2,337	4.1	−17.2
Turnout		52,714	53.9	−28.1

2004 Ghanaian parliamentary election: Awutu-Senya Source:Electoral Commission of Ghana
Party	Candidate	Votes	%	±%
New Patriotic Party	Oppey Abbey	32,539	50.3	15.2
National Democratic Congress	Moses Arhinful Acquah	18,797	29.0	−23.3
Independent	David Nana Larbie	12,082	18.7	—
Convention People's Party	Stephen Kobina Quaye	571	0.9	−8.6
People's National Convention	Oliver Mensah Tetteh	523	0.8	−0.4
EGLE	Charlotte Estella Pobee	228	0.4	—
Majority		13,742	21.3	4.1
Turnout		65,895	82.0	—

2000 Ghanaian parliamentary election: Awutu-Senya Source:Adam Carr's Election Archives
Party	Candidate	Votes	%	±%
National Democratic Congress	Hanna Tetteh K. Podar	18,813	52.3	1.6
New Patriotic Party	John Kojo Ackah	12,639	35.1	5.9
Convention People's Party	Joshua Kweku Bentum	3,452	9.5	—
National Reform Party	Sam Kish	513	1.4	—
People's National Convention	Yusif Abdallah	451	1.2	0.0
United Ghana Movement	Isaac Afful-Brew	116	0.3	—
Majority		6,174	17.2	−4.3
Turnout		—	—	—

1996 Ghanaian parliamentary election: Awutu-Senya Source:Electoral Commission of Ghana
Party	Candidate	Votes	%	±%
National Democratic Congress	Babalami Abu-Sadat	20,347	50.7	—
New Patriotic Party	Haruna Esseku	11,722	29.2	—
People's Convention Party	Clifford Okyne	7,234	18.0	—
People's National Convention	Haruna Atta-Husseyin	493	1.2	—
National Convention Party	S. K. Romeo-Tetteh	370	0.9	—
Majority		8,625	21.5	—
Turnout		40,166	80.5	48.8

1992 Ghanaian parliamentary election: Awutu-Senya Source:Electoral Commission of Ghana
Party	Candidate	Votes	%	±%
National Convention Party	Danny William Osardu	—	—	—
Majority		—	—	—
Turnout		12,005	31.7	—

== See also ==
- List of Ghana Parliament constituencies
- Awutu-Senya West Constituency
- Awutu-Senya East Constituency
- Awutu/Effutu/Senya District
