= Mother and Child Hospital =

Public hospital in Kasoa, Ghana

- Ministry of Health

Geography
- Location: Kasoa, Awutu Senya East Municipal Assembly, Central Region, Ghana

Organisation
- Care system: Public - Ghana Health Service

Services
- Emergency department: Yes
- Beds: 80

Links
- Lists: Hospitals in Ghana

The Mother and Child Hospital (formerly Kasoa Mother and Child Polyclinic) is a public hospital located in Kasoa in the Awutu Senya East Municipal Assembly of the Central Region in Ghana. As at 2021, the Medical Superintendent of the hospital was David Mekano.

== History ==
John Mahama built the facility. In 2026, Grace Ayensu-Danquah donated equipment to the hospital.

== Facilities ==
The hospital has 80 beds and a surgical theatre.

== Controversies ==
In 2024, the facility was accused of medical negligence after a 17-year-old boy called Nana Adu died there.

In 2026, a pregnant woman named Abigail Opoku was reported to have died at the hospital after she was allegedly unable to undergo a caesarean section due to the unavailability of beds in the facility’s recovery ward. The Central Regional Health Directorate of the Ghana Health Service started an investigation into the incident.
