= Effutu Municipal District =

- Municipal District
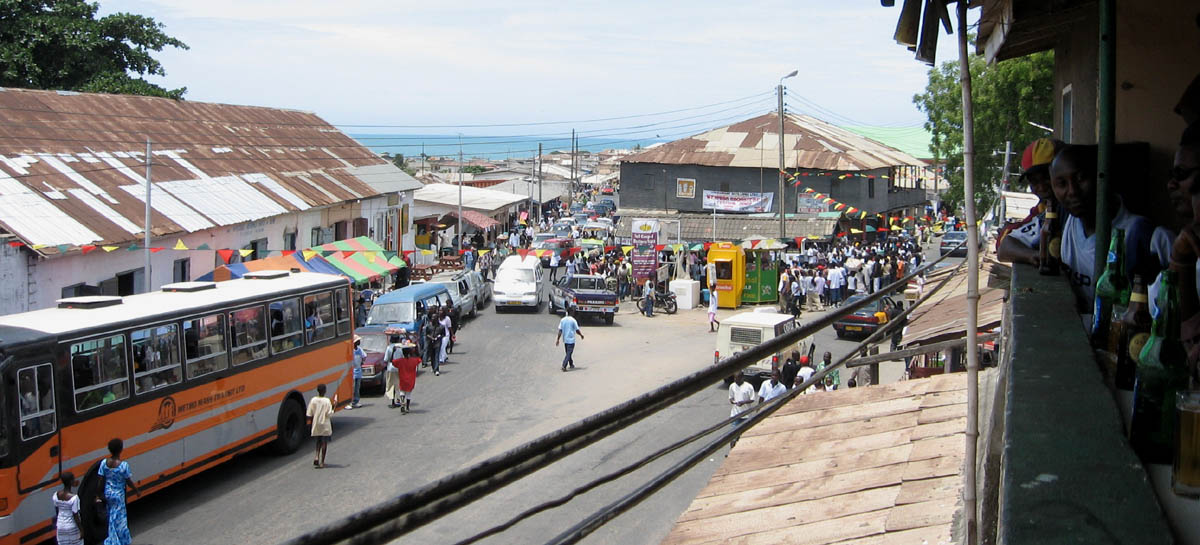
- Winneba during Aboakyer festival

- Districts of Central Region

- Location of Effutu Municipal District within Central
- Coordinates: 5°20′41.64″N 0°37′6.96″W
- Country: Ghana
- Region: Central
- Capital: Winneba

Government
  - Municipal Chief Executive: Nii Ephraim

Population (2021)
  - Total: 107,798
- Time zone: UTC+0 (GMT)
- ISO 3166 code: GH-CP-EF
- Website: Official Website

Effutu Municipal District is one of the twenty-two districts in Central Region, Ghana. Originally it was formerly part of the then-larger Awutu/Effutu/Senya District in 1988, until the southwest part of the district was split off by a decree of president John Agyekum Kufuor on 29 February 2008 to create Awutu Senya District; thus the remaining part was elevated to municipal district assembly status to become Effutu Municipal District on that same year. The municipality is located in the southeast part of Central Region and has Winneba as its capital town.

== List of settlements ==
Settlements of Effutu Municipal Assembly
No.	Settlement	Population	Population year
1	Adawukwa		
2	Akuffo Krodua		
3	Anim Akubrifa		
4	Awutu Bereku		
5	Awutu Senya Bawjiase		
6	Bewuanum		
7	Bontrase		
8	Fianko		
9	Gomoa Feteh		
10	Kasoa		
11	Obrachire		
12	Ofaada		
13	Ofaakor		
14	Opeikuma		
15	Sankor		
16	Winneba	58,750	2012

== Sources ==
- "Effutu Municipal District". Statoids.
- District: Effutu Municipal District
