= Edward Ato Sarpong =

Ghanaian politician and businessman (born 1969)

Hon. Edward Ato Sarpong
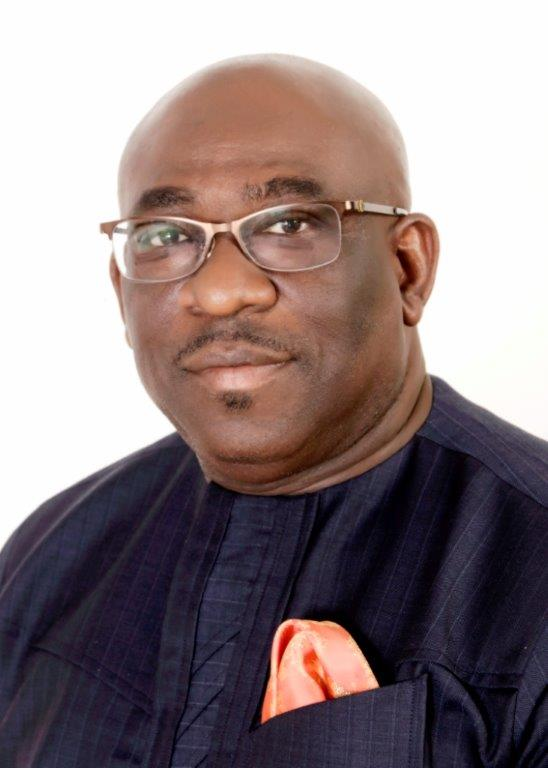

Deputy Minister for Communications
- President: John Dramani Mahama
- Preceded by: Victoria Lakshmi Hamahrr
- Succeeded by: George Andah
- Succeeded by: Kojo Oppong Nkrumah

Personal details
- Born: Cape Coast
- Party: National Democratic Congress

Edward Ato Sarpong (born March 29, 1969) is a business executive, chartered accountant, business and leadership consultant, executive coach, speaker, author, and politician of Ghanaian descent.

Ato Sarpong is the managing director of the indigenous state-owned Agricultural Development Bank (ADB)

Previously, he served as the Deputy Minister for Communications during President John Dramani Mahama's first tenure in office.

== Career ==
Ato Sarpong is currently the managing director of the Agricultural Development Bank (ADB)
