= Babalami Abu Sadat =

Ghanaian politician

Member of parliament for Awutu-Senya Constituency
- In office 7 January 1997 – 6 January 2001
- President: John Jerry Rawlings

Personal details
- Born: Awutu/Senya, Central Region Ghana
- Party: National Democratic Congress
- Occupation: Politician

Babalami Abu-Sadat is a Ghanaian politician and a member of the Second Parliament of the Fourth republic representing the Awutu-Senya Constituency in the Central Region of Ghana.

== Early life ==
Sadat was born in Awutu Senya in the Central Region of Ghana.

== Career ==
Sadat is a Former member of Parliament for the Awutu-Senya East Constituency.

== Politics ==
Sadat was first elected into Parliament on the ticket of the National Democratic Congress for the Awutu Senya Constituency in the Central Region of Ghana during the December 1996 Ghanaian general elections. He polled 20,347 votes out of the 40,166 valid votes cast representing 40.80% over his opponents Haruna Esseku of the New Patriotic Party who polled 11,722 representing 23.50%, Clifford Okyne of the Convention People's Party who polled 7,234 votes representing 14.50%, Haruna Atta-Husseyin of the People's National Convention who polled 493 votes representing 1.00% and S. K. Romeo-Tetteh of the Nationalist Congress Party who also polled 370 votes representing 0.70%.
