= Winneba Community Nursing Training College =

Coordinates: 5.3710°N 0.6428°W

The Winneba Community Nursing Training College is public tertiary health institution in the Winneba in the Central Region of Ghana. The college is in the Efutu Municipal Assembly. The activities of the institution is supervised by the Ministry of Health. The Nursing and Midwifery Council (NMC) is the regulator of its activities, curriculum and examination of the student nurses and midwives. The council's mandate Is enshrined under section 4(1) of N.R.C.D 117.
