= Awutu-Senya East (Ghana parliament constituency) =

Constituency in the Central Region of Ghana

- constituency for the Parliament of Ghana
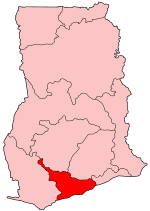
- District: Awutu/Effutu/Senya District
- Region: Central Region of Ghana

Current constituency
- Party: National Democratic Congress
- MP: Phillis Naa Koryoo Okunor

Awutu-Senya East is one of the constituencies represented in the Parliament of Ghana. It elects one member of parliament (MP) through the first-past-the-post system of election. Phillis Naa Koryoo Akunor is the member of parliament for the constituency. Awutu-Senya East is located in the Awutu/Effutu/Senya district of the Central Region of Ghana.

== Boundaries ==
The seat is located entirely within the Awutu/Effutu/Senya district of the Central Region of Ghana.

== Members of Parliament ==
Election	Member	Party
2012	Mavis Hawa Koomson	New Patriotic Party
2016	Mavis Hawa Koomson	New Patriotic Party

== Elections ==
Ghanaian parliamentary election, 2016: Awutu-Senya East Source:
Party	Candidate	Votes	%	±%
New Patriotic Party	Mavis Hawa Koomson	34,656	58.10	
National Democratic Congress	Adams Nuhu Timbile	24,373	40.8	
Progressive People's Party	Nana Kwaku Appia Kwarteng	494	0.83	
Convention People's Party	Addy Ishmael	123	0.21	
Majority		10,283	17.3	
Turnout		59,646		

2012 Ghanaian parliamentary election: Awutu-Senya East Source:
Party	Candidate	Votes	%	±%
New Patriotic Party	Mavis Hawa Koomson	31,054	52.50	
National Democratic Congress	Adams Nuhu Timbile	26,884	45.45	
Progressive People's Party	Rasheed Adu-Gyamfi	1,024	1.73	
People's National Convention	Mumuni Iddisah	124	0.21	
National Democratic Party	Edward Kwasi Antwi	64	0.11	
Majority		4,170	7.05	
Turnout		59,150		

== See also ==
- List of Ghana Parliament constituencies
- Awutu/Effutu/Senya District
