= Yaa Ntiamoah Badu =

Ghanaian zoologist and environmental specialist

Emerita Prof. Yaa Ntiamoa-Baidu PhD

Chair MiDA
- Incumbent
- Assumed office March 2017
- President: Nana Akuffo-Addo

Personal details
- Born: Ghana
- Education: University of Ghana
- Occupation: Academic
- Profession: Zoologist

Yaa Ntiamoa-Baidu is a Ghanaian zoologist, environmental specialist, academic and management expert. In March 2017, she was appointed the Chair of the Board of Millennium Development Authority of Ghana. She served as a Pro Vice Chancellor of the University of Ghana until her retirement in 2011. She is a member of the New Patriotic Party of Ghana.

== Biography ==
Yaa Ntiamoa-Badiu studied at St. Monica's Senior High School for the O-level, then at Konongo Odumase Senior High School for the A-level. She studied at the University of Ghana, where she received a first class degree in Zoology in 1975, then a PhD at the University of Edinburgh in 1980. She was a lecturer in the Department of Zoology of the University of Ghana, in 1985, then an associate professor in 1995. In 2003, she was appointed as a full professor.

She was appointed to the university's management committee as the Pro-vice-chancellor for Research, Innovation and Development. While at the university, she was the director for the Centre for African Wetlands and the University of Ghana Carnegie Next Generation Of Academics in Africa. She served with Kwesi Yankah, who was the Pro-Vice Chancellor for Academic and Students Affairs. She served in the position until July 2011 when she retired from the university and was replaced by Prof. John Gyapong. In 2005, Yaa Ntiamoa-Baidu was inducted along with four other professors of various academic disciplines as fellows of the Ghana Academy of Arts and Sciences.

== Chair of MiDA Board ==
In March 2017, President Nana Akufo-Addo appointed her to chair the fourteen member board of the Millennium Development Authority. She was sworn in together with the other members of the board on 13 March 2017 at The Flagstaff House. The president charged her with directing the activities of the board to ensure that the very purpose of the Second Compact agreement between the Government of Ghana and the Millennium Challenge Corporation of the United States are achieved and on time. Her principal aim is to judiciously use the 498.2 million dollar investment from the Millennium Challenge Corporation to improve electricity generation and supply to individuals and companies. The agreement has a five-year time frame within which all aspects of the agreement must be fulfilled.
