= Millennium City, Ghana =

Town in Central Region, Ghana

Millennium City
- Town
- Location of Millennium City, Ghana in Central Region
- Coordinates: 05°29′57.8″N 00°26′38″W
- Country: Ghana
- Region: Central Region
- District: Gomoa East District
- Elevation: 80 m (260 ft)
- Time zone: UTC0 (GMT)

Millennium City is a suburb of Kasoa and is located in the Gomoa East District in the Central Region of Ghana. As at 2024, the Gyasehene of Millennium City is Benlord Ababio also known as ‘Nana Ben’.

== Institutions ==
- Millennium City Police Station
- 21st Century Construction Limited
- Millennium City Housing Company Limited
