= Apiba Festival =

Festival of Senya-Beraku People

Apiriba Festival is an annual festival celebrated by the chiefs and peoples of Senya Beraku, an aboriginal Guan town in the Central Region of Ghana. It is usually celebrated in the month of June. It marks the beginning of the first harvest of maize which was planted in May.

== Celebrations ==
During the festival, a special ritual food known as mpotoroba is prepared from unleaven corn dough with palm oil. It is eaten from one paternal family known as Seye or prama, to the other. Visitors are welcomed to share food and local drinks. The people put on traditional clothes and there is gathering of family members and elders. There is also dancing and drumming.

== Significance ==
This festival is celebrated to mark an event that took place in the past.
