= Gomoa-Awutu-Effutu-Senya District =

Gomoa-Awutu-Effutu-Senya District Council
- Former District Council
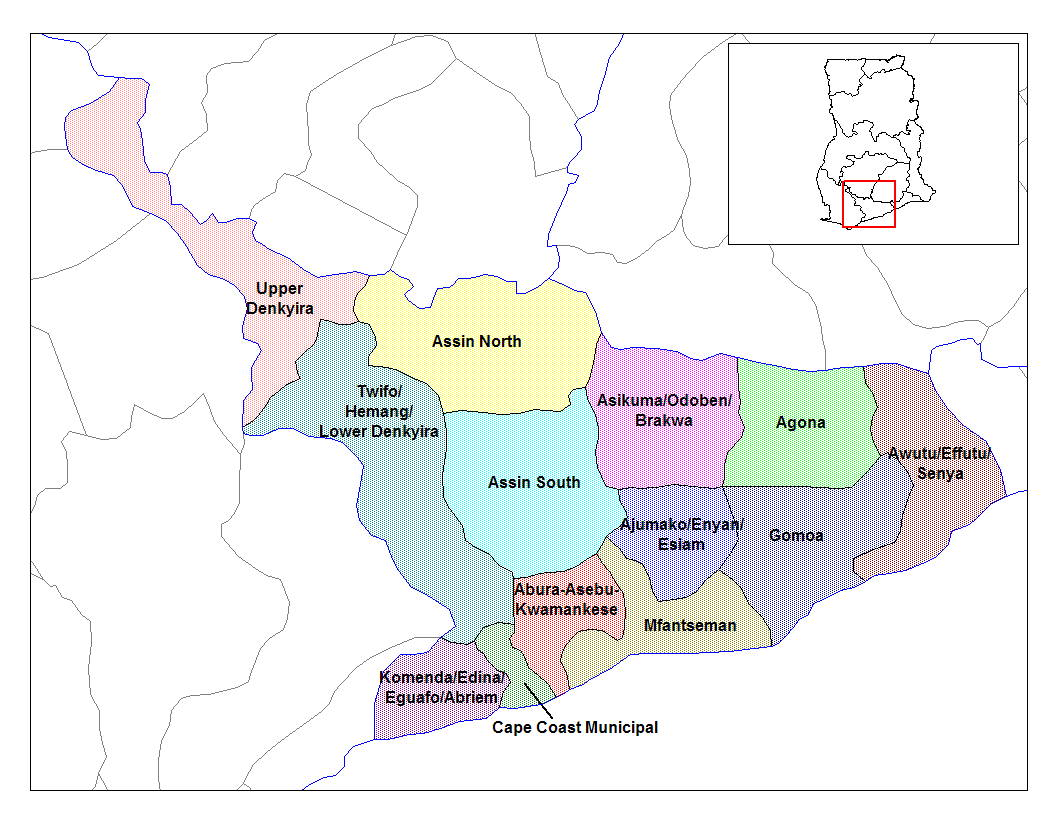
- Districts of Central Region

- Location of Gomoa-Awutu-Effutu-Senya District Council within Central
- Coordinates: 5°20′41.64″N 0°37′6.96″W
- Country: Ghana
- Region: Central
- Capital: Winneba
- Time zone: UTC+0 (GMT)
- ISO 3166 code: GH-CP-__

Gomoa-Awutu-Effutu-Senya District is a former district council that was located in Central Region, Ghana. Originally created as a district council in 1975. However, on 1988, it was split off into two new district assemblies: Awutu/Effutu/Senya District (capital: Winneba) and Gomoa District (capital: Apam). The district council was located in the southeast part of Central Region and had Winneba as its capital town.
