= Awutu-Senya West (Ghana parliament constituency) =

Constituency in the Central Region of Ghana

- constituency for the Parliament of Ghana
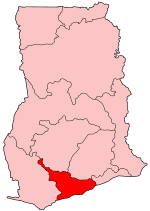
- District: Awutu Senya District
- Region: Central Region of Ghana

Current constituency
- Party: National Democratic Congress
- MP: Gizella Akushika Tetteh-Agbotui

Awutu-Senya West is one of the constituencies represented in the Parliament of Ghana. It elects one Member of Parliament (MP) by the first past the post system of election. Gizella Akushika Tetteh-Agbotui is the member of parliament for the constituency. The Awutu-Senya West constituency is located in the Awutu Senya District of the Central Region of Ghana. In 2012, ahead of the 2012 elections, the Awutu-Senya West Constituency was carved out of the then Awutu-Senya constituency.

== Boundaries ==
The seat is located entirely within the Awutu Senya District of the Central Region of Ghana.

== Members of Parliament ==
Election	Member	Party
2013	Hanna Serwaa Tetteh	NDC
2017	Andah George Nenyi Kojo	NPP
2021	Gizella Tetteh Agbotui	NDC

Ghanaian parliamentary election, 2016 : Awutu-Senya West Peacefmonline
Party	Candidates	Votes	%
NPP	Andah George Nenyi Kojo	28,867	52.72
NDC	Hanna Serwaa Tetteh	25,664	46.87
CPP	Alan Barnes Yawson	228	0.42

== See also ==
- List of Ghana Parliament constituencies
- Awutu-Senya (Ghana parliament constituency)
- List of political parties in Ghana
