= Awutu/Effutu/Senya District =

- Former District
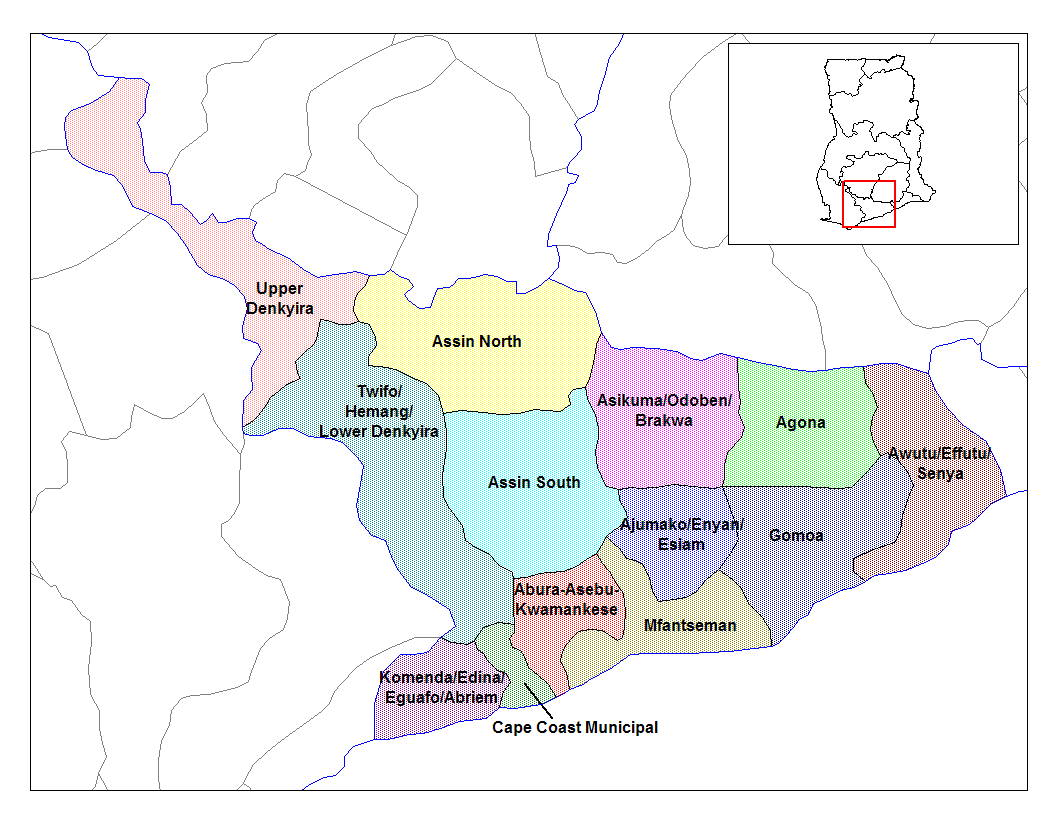
- Districts of Central Region

- Location of Awutu/Effutu/Senya District within Central
- Coordinates: 5°20′31.2″N 0°37′30″W
- Country: Ghana
- Region: Central
- Capital: Winneba

Area
  - Total: 786 km^{2} (303 sq mi)

Population
  - Ethnicity: Akan people
- Time zone: UTC+0 (GMT)
- ISO 3166 code: GH-CP-AE

Awutu/Effutu/Senya District is a former district that was located in Central Region, Ghana. Originally created as an ordinary district assembly in 1988, which was created from the former Gomoa-Awutu-Effutu-Senya District Council. However on 29 February 2008, it was split off into two new districts: Effutu Municipal District (capital: Winneba) and Awutu Senya District (capital: Awutu Breku). The district assembly was located in the southeast part of Central Region and had Winneba as its capital town.

== Sources ==
- "Awutu/Effutu/Senya District". Statoids.
- District: Awutu/Effutu/Senya District
