= Peter Mac Manu =

Ghanaian politician

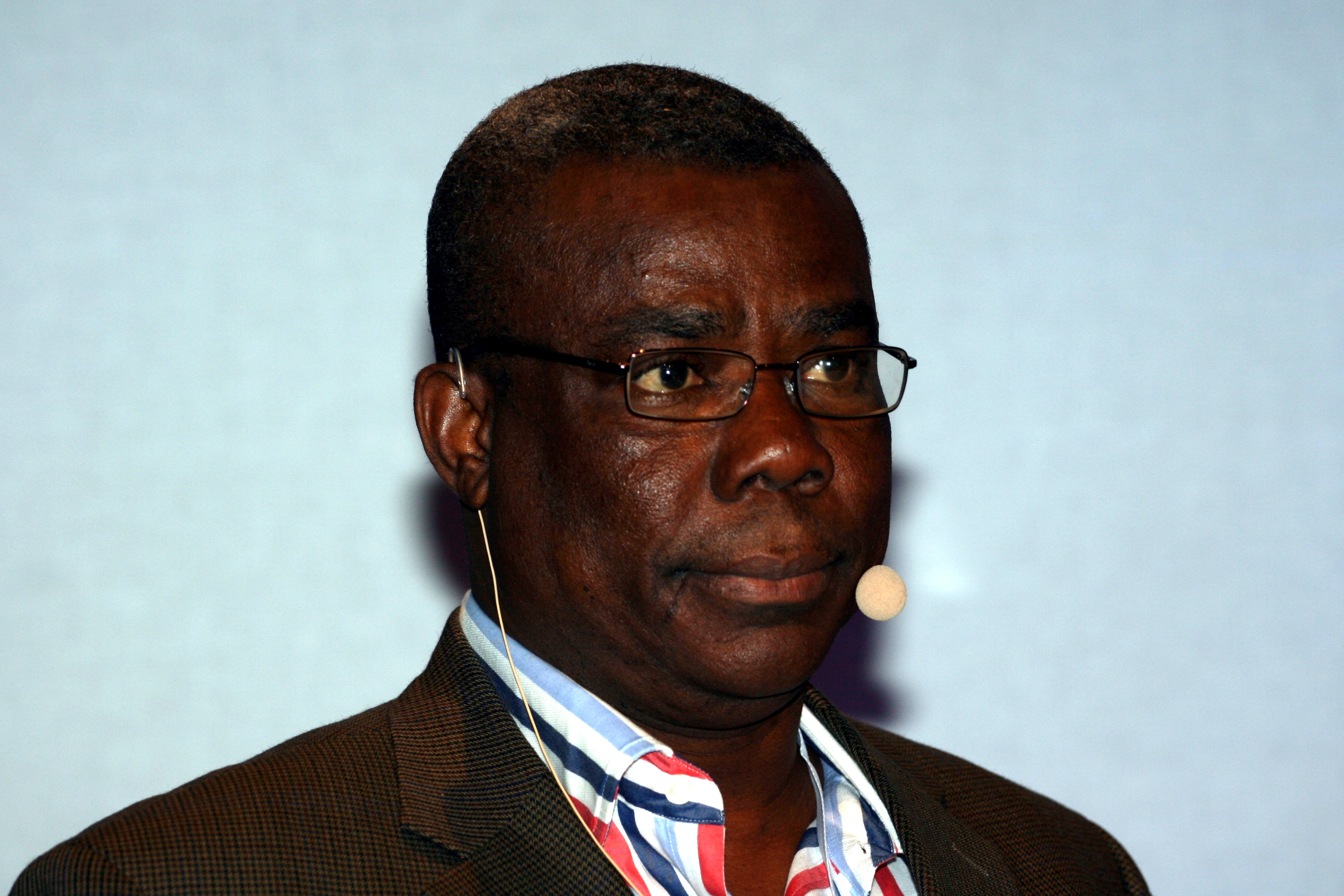

Ghana Ports And Harbours Authority Government of Ghana
- Incumbent
- Assumed office January 2017

Personal details
- Born: 1953 (age 72–73)
- Party: New Patriotic Party
- Occupation: Businessman, entrepreneur

Peter Mac Manu (born 1953) is a Ghanaian politician. He was the National Chairman of the New Patriotic Party from December 2005 to February 2010 and the Honorary Chairman of the Democrat Union of Africa. He was made the Campaign Manager for the Presidential and Parliamentary Elections which was held in 2016. He is the chairman of the Ghana Cocoa Board (COCOBOD).

== Early life and education ==
Mac Manu has a bachelor's degree in business administration from the School of Administration of the University of Ghana. He later worked as a businessman and entrepreneur and founded and managed several companies including Macal Tyre, Janus Macal Rubber Company, and a travel agency in Accra. Before being elected National Chairman, Mac Manu served as chairman of the NPP in Ghana's Western Region.

== Personal life ==
Peter Mac Manu is married and has six children.
