= Millennium Development Authority =

Ghanaian government organization

The Millennium Development Authority (MiDA) is a Government of Ghana organization established by an Act of Parliament (Act 702, 709 & 897) as amended. The Authority has the prime aim to oversee, manage and implement the programmes under the Compact Agreement signed with the Millennium Challenge Corporation of the United States of America.

The Authority, in 2012, successfully completed implementing the first Compact agreement between Ghana and the Millennium Challenge Corporation. The first Compact, a 547 million dollar grant, was used to implement agriculture, roads and educational projects which collectively would contribute to reducing poverty in Ghana and boost economic growth. The current Compact, is to last for five years (2016-2021) and is a 498.2 million dollar grant. The funds are being used to implement 6 major projects that have been designed to collectively transform Ghana's power sector and stimulate private sector investments into the sector .

== MiDA Board ==
The MiDA board is made up of fourteen members with eleven of them having voting rights. The members are:

=== Voting Members ===
- Yaa Ntiamoah Badu - Chairperson
- Ken Ofori-Atta - Minister for Finance
- Alan Kyerematen - Minister for Trade and Industry
- John Peter Amewu - Minister for Energy
- Gloria Afua Akuffo - Attorney General & Minister for Justice Otiko Afisa Djaba - Minister for Gender, Children &

=== Social Protection ===
- Ibrahim Mohammed Awal - Minister for Business Development
- Martin Eson-Benjamin - CEO, Millennium Development Authority
- Samuel Kobina DeSouza - Rep. of Private Enterprise Federation
- Humphrey Ayim Dake - Rep. Association of Ghana Industries

=== Non-voting Members ===
- Chairman of ECG Board
- Chairman of NEDCo Board
- Kenneth James Miller - Resident Country Director, Millennium Challenge Corporation.
