= Phillis Naa Koryoo Okunor =

Ghanaian politician

Phillis Naa Koryoo Okunor is a Ghanaian politician. She was born in the year 1985 in Ghana, Accra. She contested in the 2020 Ghanaian general election and is the parliamentary candidate of the NDC for Awutu-Senya East constituency in the 2024 Ghanaian general election. She won the 2024 elections by amassing 50,886 votes, representing 52.7% after defeating the incumbent member of parliament, Mavis Hawa Koomson who secured 45,638 votes, representing 47.3% of the total votes cast

== Early life and education ==
Her father is from Kenya but her mother is a Ghanaian. Her father is from the Luo tribe in Kenya. Her parents left with her to Ghana where her mother comes from. She attained LLM (IT Law) at University of Ghana (2023)
