= David Nana Larbie =

Ghanaian lawyer and politician

Hon. David Nana Larbie

Member of Parliament
- In office 7 January 2009 – 6 January 2013
- President: John Atta Mills
- Constituency: Awutu-Senya
- Majority: NDC

Personal details
- Born: 29 October 1950 (age 75)
- Party: National Democratic Congress
- Children: 6
- Education: King's College London
- Profession: Lawyer

David Nana Larbie (born 29 October 1950) is a Ghanaian lawyer and politician. He was the Member of parliament for the Awutu-Senya constituency for the 5th parliament of the 4th Republic of Ghana.

== Early life and education ==
Larbie was born on 29 October 1950. He hails from Awutu in the Central Region of Ghana. He was educated at King's College London where he studied European Community Law and obtained a Post Graduate Diploma.

== Career ==
Larbie was a London-based legal consultant before his involvement in Ghanaian politics. He worked as a Legal Advisor for the Sanana Legal Advisory Services in Stratford, London.

== Politics ==
He was elected as a National Democratic Congress Member of Parliament for the Awutu-Senya constituency in the 2008 Ghanaian general elections for representation in the 5th parliament of the 4th republic of Ghana. He won the elections for the constituency with 25,666 votes, making 49.61%, of all total valid votes cast. He contested with Oppey Abbey of the New Patriotic Party, Kofi Akotua-Obeng of the Democratic Freedom Party, Richard Paa-Tawia of the Convention People's Party and Haroon Tetteh Mensah an independent candidate. These obtained 45.10%, 1.33%, 1.90% and 2.05% respectively of the total valid votes cast.

== Personal life ==
David Nana Larbie is married with 6 children. He is a Christian.
