= Awutu Senya District =

- Former District
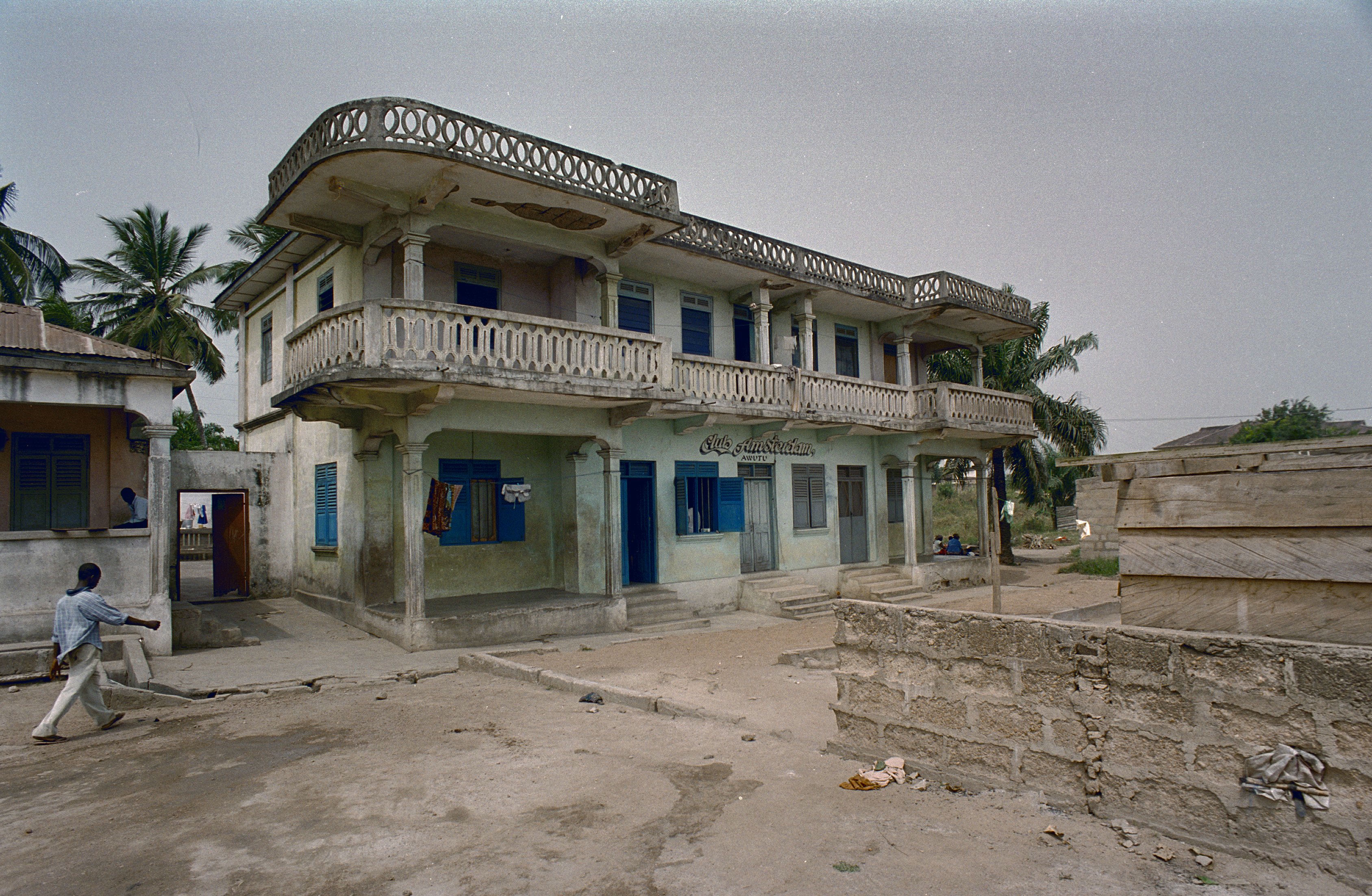
- Club Amsterdam in Awutu, Ghana

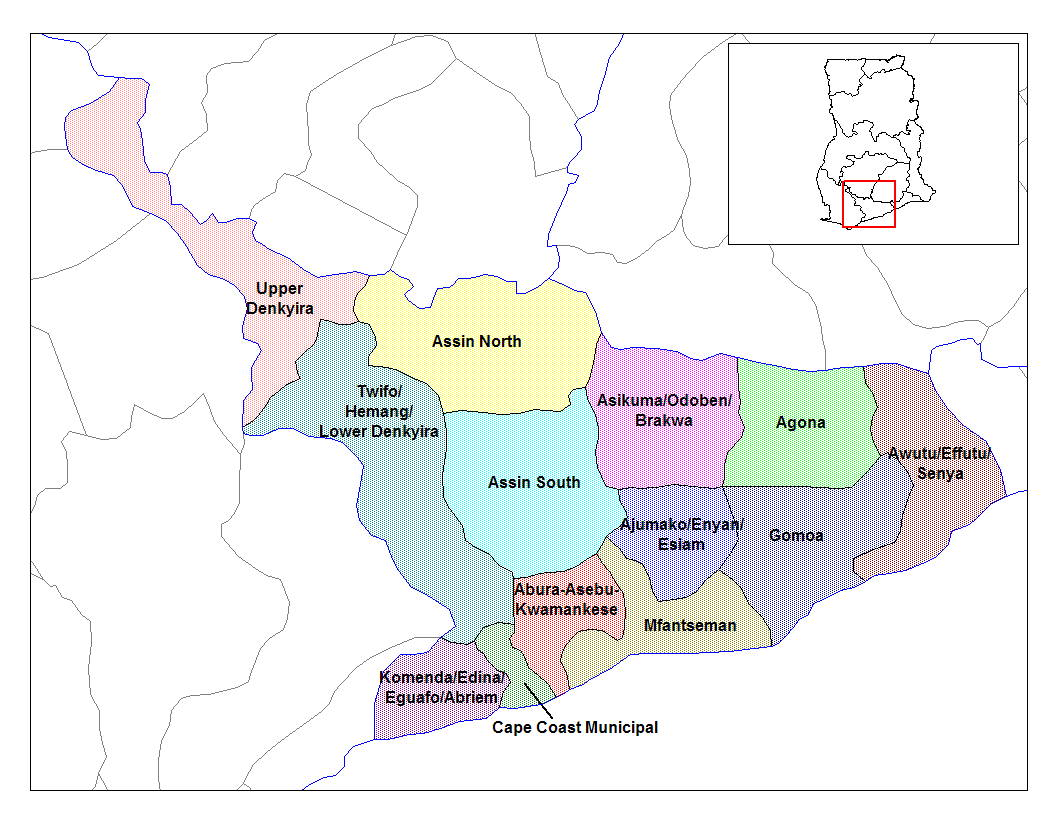
- Districts of Central Region

- Location of Awutu Senya District within Central
- Coordinates: 5°30′45.72″N 0°30′49.68″W
- Country: Ghana
- Region: Central
- Capital: Awutu Breku

Government
  - District Executive: Sampson Abbey Armah
  - Presiding Member: William Danny Osardu

Area
  - Total: 279.9 km^{2} (108.1 sq mi)

Population (2021)
  - Total: 161,460
- Time zone: UTC+0 (GMT)
- ISO 3166 code: GH-CP-__

Awutu Senya District is a former district that was located in Central Region, Ghana. Originally it was part of the larger Awutu/Effutu/Senya District, which split in two on 29 February 2008. A few years later, on 28 June 2012, the Awutu Senya District itself split into two new districts: Awutu Senya West District (capital: Awutu Breku) and Awutu Senya East District (which was later elevated to municipal district assembly status on 15 March 2018; capital: Kasoa). The district assembly was located in the southeast part of Central Region and had Awutu Breku as its capital town.

== List of settlements ==
Settlements of Assin South District
No.	Settlement	Population	Population year
1	Awutu Breku		
1	Senya Beraku		

== See also ==
- Awubia Festival

== Sources ==
- "Awutu/Senya District". Statoids.
- District: Awutu/Senya District
