= Senya =

- Town
- Country: Ghana
- Region: Central Region

Senya is a town in the Central Region of Ghana. The town is known for the Senya Secondary School. The school is a second cycle institution. Senya is also a name used by the people of the Volta Region of Ghana. It is a name which simply means or implies in ewe that "Destiny Knows".
