= Awutu Senya West (district) =

Awutu Senya West District
- District
- Districts of Central Region

- Location of Awutu Senya West District within Central
- Coordinates: 5°30′45.72″N 0°30′49.68″W
- Country: Ghana
- Region: Central
- Capital: Awutu Breku

Population (2021)
  - Total: 161,460
- Time zone: UTC+0 (GMT)
- ISO 3166 code: GH-CP-AW

Awutu Senya West District is one of the twenty-two districts in Central Region, Ghana. Originally it was formerly part of the then-larger Awutu Senya District on 29 February 2008, until the eastern part of the district was split off to create Awutu Senya East District on 28 June 2012 (which it was later elevated to municipal district assembly status on 15 March 2018 to become Awutu Senya East Municipal District); thus the remaining part has been renamed as Awutu Senya West District. The district assembly is located in the southeast part of Central Region and has Awutu Breku as its capital town.
