= Kasoa =

Kasoa Eshaapa
- Town
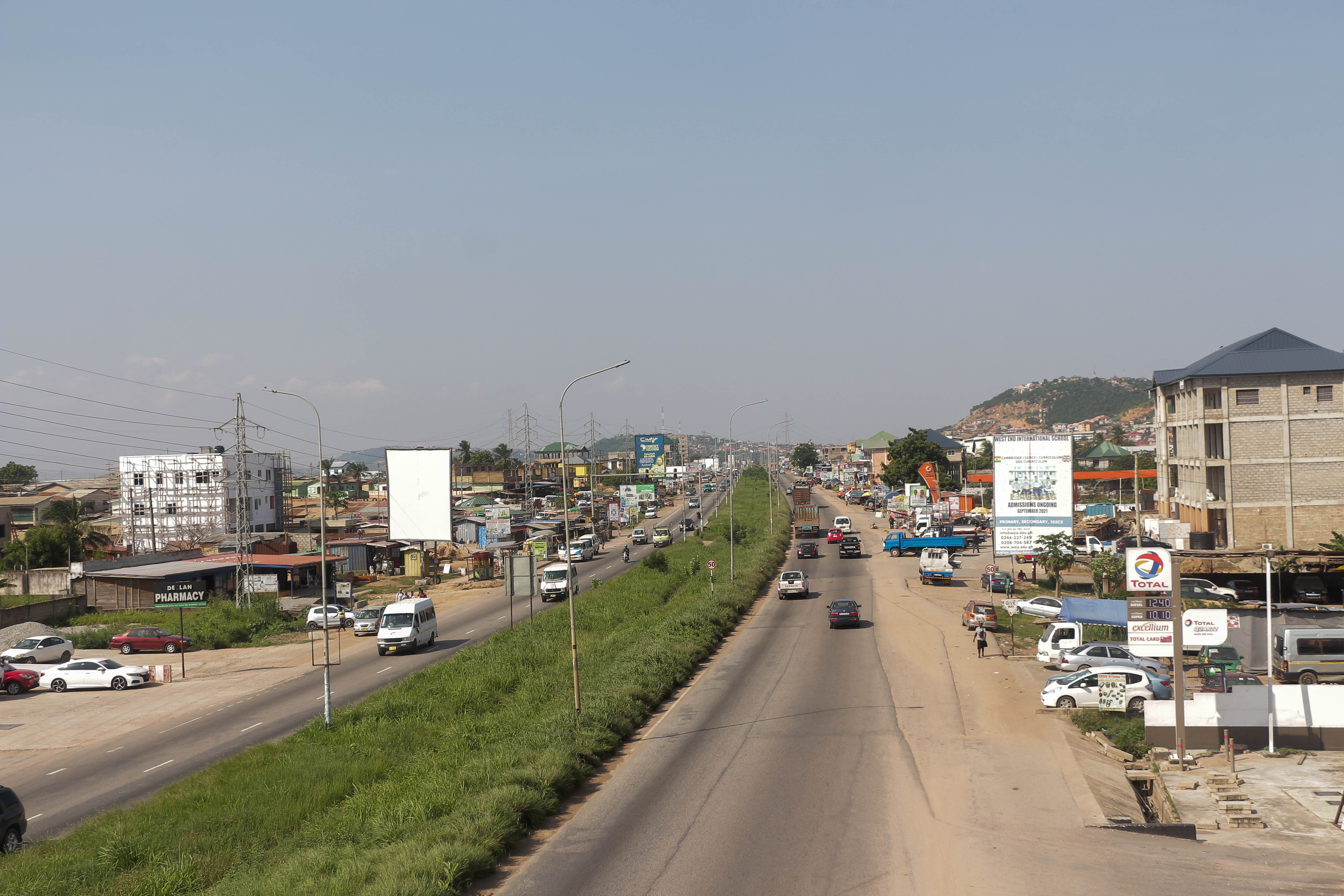

- Location of Kasoa in Central Region
- Coordinates: 5°32′3.7″N 0°25′31.7″W
- Country: Ghana
- Region: Central Region
- District: Awutu Senya East District
- Elevation: 80 m (260 ft)
- 370,000
- Time zone: UTC0 (GMT)

Kasoa is a peri-urban town in the Awutu Senya East Municipal District of the Central region of Ghana.

== Location ==
Kasoa has territory in one of the 20 metropolitan, municipalities and districts (MMADs) in the Central Region of Ghana: Awutu Senya East Municipal Assembly (ASEMA). It is the largest and fastest growing town and municipality.

The city is situated along the Accra-Cape Coast Road. It is approximately 36 kilometres (22 mi), by road, west of Accra International Airport, which serves Ghana's capital city of Accra. It is approximately 28 kilometres (17 mi), by road, west of the central business district of the city of Accra. The coordinates of the town are: 05 31 12N, 00 28 48W (Latitude:5.5200; Longitude:-0.4800).

The average elevation of Kasoa is 75 m above sea level.

== Climate ==
Kasoa experiences a five-month dry season lasting from November through March. During the dry season, the northeast trade winds are prominent. The dry season is followed by a seven-month rainy season that lasts from April through October. During this rainy season, the southwest monsoon winds are most common. The rainy season is usually characterized by flooding, low crop yield, and financial strain for a large portion of Kasoa's population.

== Population ==
Awutu Ofaakor are the indigenous to Kasoa currently Odupong. Awutu, Akan and English are the most commonly spoken languages. Kasoa is traditionally home to the Awutu tribe who belong to the guan ethnic group. Today, it is home to other ethnic groups such as Hausas, Gas, Akans, Ewes, Walas/Dagartis, Moshies, Basares and other smaller tribes. As of 2010, Kasoa's population was estimated to be 370,384 people. Ghana has experienced rapid population growth in the past three decades. The population growth directly affects Kasoa, and other peri-urban areas. Kasoa is reported to be one of the fastest-growing communities in West Africa.

This growth is revealed by an examination and comparison of Kasoa's population in 1970, 1984, 2000 and 2010. In 1970, Kasoa had a population of 863. In 1984, the population was 2,597. In 2000, the population was 34,719. In 2010, the population grew to 69,384. Clearly, there has been an increase in the population size over the past 40 years. Comparing the change in population between the aforementioned dates proves the fact that the population is increasing at an increasing rate. From 1970 to 1984 the population increased by 1,734 people. Between 1984 and 2000, the population increased by 32,122 people. Lastly, from 2000 to 2010, the population increased by 34,665. The net population growth between 1970 and 2010 is 68,521. This means that in the past 40 years, Kasoa has multiplied by more than 79 times than what it was in 1970. This close consideration of the population reported by the National Analytical Report quantitatively indicates just how fast the population of Kasoa has been and is continuing to grow. Approximately 4 decades ago, Kasoa was a rural community; it is now very rapidly urbanizing.

Since 2000, the “spill-over effect” of the growing population of the Accra-Tema metropolitan area into smaller towns around the edges has contributed greatly to the rapid increase in the populations of towns, like Kasoa. Challenges associated with living in the overly crowded urban centers such as transportation and safe/affordable housing have influenced individuals working in the Urban centers to have their place of residence be in a nearby settlements—often peri-urban areas like Kasoa—and commute into the urban center for work.

The population growth of Kasoa and its repercussions can be understood as the result of urban sprawl. Rural-Urban migration due to diminished economic opportunities in rural Ghana and migration to Accra has led to a huge urban sprawl, which is the spreading of an urban population into surrounding areas such as peri-urban Kasoa. This sprawl has had very specific and identifiable effects on Kasoa, due to the fact that the growth was spontaneous and unplanned. This spontaneous growth imposed a large number of inhabitants on a town that did not have the infrastructure nor the established planning. Subsequently, the original name, Eshaapa has been subsumed by Kasoa, a name bestowed by migrant settlers who have dominated the population. Kasoa is finding ways to cope with issues that have arisen from the combination of a rapidly increasing population and infrastructure that was intended for a much smaller population size.

Due to indiscriminate, unplanned and haphazard development, traffic has become a major issue that the institutions and the individuals of Kasoa are both combating and learning to cope with. Another major issue is insufficient market space for a growing number of sellers. Further more, as a result of the continual increase in Kasoa's population, there is an increasing demand for residential land to accommodate the quickly growing population. This demand has resulted in the conversion of agricultural land to non-agricultural land. This conversion deeply effects the livelihoods of a large number of Kasoa's farmers.

As of 2026, Kasoa's population is estimated to be around 100,000.

== Politics ==
In 1957, Ghana became the first African country to declare independence from European colonization. Until 2007, Kasoa was fully encompassed by a single district, the Awutu Effutu Senya District. In 2007, the district split into the Awutu Senya district to the north and Effutu Municipal to the south. Soon after the split, the Kasoa Urban Council became one of the two urban councils in the Awutu Senya district. In 2012, the Awutu Senya East Municipal Assembly (ASEMA) was formed in an effort to support the government's decentralization programs and to strengthen local governments. Kasoa is now the administrative capital of ASEMA.

The political organization of Kasoa is "semi-traditional." This can be considered to follow the framework of a centralized system. It is a society ruled by a chief whose authority is to be recognized by all who live within the established boundaries of his territory. Kasoa is also politically supported by administrative and judicial institutions. These institutions have changed drastically due to the influence of colonial and modern institutions.

Kasoa's traditional political institution is traditional Akan Chieftaincy. According to Article 277 of Ghana's Constitution, a chief is "a person, who, hailing from the appropriate family and lineage, has been validly nominated, elected, or selected and enstooled or installed as a chief or queen-mother in accordance with the relevant customary law and usage." The Paramount Chief (Omanhene) is at the top of the hierarchy of chieftaincy. The Paramount Chief is the head of the Traditional Council and a direct representative of the state. Below the Paramount Chief is the Paramount Queen Mother (Ohemaa). The Queen Mother is responsible for issues related to women, social affairs, and social conduct. She is also responsible for rituals concerning women and for settling disputed among women to “ensure that all women live in peace and harmony.” The Paramount Queenmother also selects the Paramount Chief for consideration by Regency Council on the death of the Paramount Chief. Beneath the Paramount Chief and the Paramount Queen Mother are Senior Divisional Chiefs, sub-divisional chiefs, and Town chiefs. There are also chiefs who perform special functions in the palaces of these key chiefs ranging from linguist to caretaker of the youth and the aged to protection from enemies. Odpongkpehe Kasoa's chief is Nai Odupong Awushie Tetteh II and also serves as the Benkumhene for Ebla Odefey Division of the Awutu Paramountcy.

The traditional customs of land ownership in Kasoa are unique. The land sellers are the chiefs and the family heads and the purchase of land does not guarantee ownership, it only guarantees access to the land as its caretaker for an agreed upon duration; after which the land will be returned to the ownership of the original seller. There has been a major shift from agricultural land to residential and commercial land and land value has increased from GH500 to GH10,000 per plot. As a result, peri-urban agricultural opportunities are decreasing drastically as land is converted into commercial and residential land. As land becomes increasingly developed, the chief has the authority to decide what land will be developed. The chief then informs the family living on the desired land that the land will be developed. The family is then supposed to be allowed to keep and live off of 1/3 of the land while the remaining 2/3 is granted to the developer. However, there have been reports that suggest that this practice is occasionally not honored and that the land is re-allocated, in its entirety, to the developer.

However, steps are being taken by the national government to address these anomalies. Recently at the sod-cutting ceremony for the construction of the Mallam Junction Interchange, the Odupong chiefs were allowed to do the traditional pouring of libation. This did not sit well with some self-styled Ga chiefs from Gbawe who organized a protest but this was met with derision by the sitting President of the Republic of Ghana at the time, J.A. Kufuor. He told them that the documents in Government possession indicate it is Awutu not Ga land. This has spurred efforts to recover the said documents and obtain judgements at the courts.

== Economy ==
Kasoa is home to one of the most prominent markets in the Awutu-Senya district. Agro-processed products are popular items at these markets. One of these products is cassava that is processed into popular food items called ‘agbelima’ and ‘gari’. Agriculture and business associated with agriculture is one of the leading economic activities for Kasoa's working population. Farming and fishing are very popular in the lowlands near the coast. In 2013, construction of an Abattoir—a slaughter house—was begun in order to enable Kasoa to provide more food for its rapidly growing population. In response to the growing need for peri-urban transport, private enterprises have been developed in the form of privately owned trotro and shared taxis which provide transportation for passengers, goods, and animals.

Kasoa's market is the main regional market. The market is consistently packed and it is often difficult for new traders to be able to sell their goods at the market because all of the stalls are occupied. In 1991 the plans for a new market in Kasoa were established and the plot of land where the market was to be built was purchased. However, due to a lack of funding, construction could not begin until ten years later. Construction of the new market began in 2001, during President J.A. Kufuor's administration, after funds were provided by NGOs and with the cooperation of the Awutu Senya East Municipal Assembly. In January 2013, the market was improved. Through the combined efforts of the Awutu Senya East Municipal Assembly and the Kasoa Traders Association, new stalls were built for traders at the market.

Transportation is a major issue that many individuals from Kasoa and neighboring areas must face in order to be able to participate in the marketplace. Many must overcome the obstacles of heavy traffic, poor road conditions, and/or unaffordable public transportation, in order to access the market. Those who face these issues may be at an economic disadvantage when unreliable transport results in the late arrival to the market. Once a seller has arrived late, shoppers may have already purchased significant amounts of goods from sellers who were not affected by the unreliable transportation and were able to be at the market on time.

A study conducted in Kasoa surveyed 305 micro and small scale enterprises and revealed that 77.78% of the business owners had no knowledge about cash management procedures. The study argued that this is an indicator of the need for proper training of business owners in the realm of cash management in order to initiate capacity building. Another survey conducted in the Kasoa market, although concerned largely with the oil sales sector, revealed a number of issues face by individuals whose livelihoods depend on sales in the market. One issue that the study revealed was difficulty with hygienically storing goods and keeping them from spoiling. The survey indicated that 59% of the salespersons had no education and used a variety of techniques (both effective and ineffective) for preserving their goods. 90% inappropriately stored their goods, which were exposed to too much sun and/or potentially contaminated by unhygienic storage practices such as storing goods in dirty containers. The interviewees greatest concerns were low-profits, unsteady demand, unreliable competition, the unavailability of space and the lack of funds to expand their business,

Demand for many goods shift seasonally. Oil sales spike during the seasons where fish are plentiful because traditional fish processors purchase oil from the market for frying fish. Unreliable sales competition is a large issue for traders who sell goods that can be purchased from large producers at a lower cost. Furthermore, 80% of sellers reported that they needed help in the area of finance in order to expand their businesses.

Ghana Rural Action Support Program (GRASP) is a non-governmental organization (NGO) that has initiated micro-finance loans for women in order to empower women and boost female economic activity in Kasoa. An article in the Journal of Global Gender Studies, reports that studies conducted by Eunice Adjei-Bosompem in 2013 suggested that the initial loan amounts were insufficient for women to successfully start and sustain on-going income generating activities (IGAs). The resulting suggestions for improving the short-term and long-term effectiveness of micro-finance loans were to increase loan amounts and loan return time, in addition to encouraging the development and utilization of technologies that will increase productivity.

== See also ==
- Millennium City, Ghana
- Mother and Child Hospital
