= Senya Beraku =

- Town
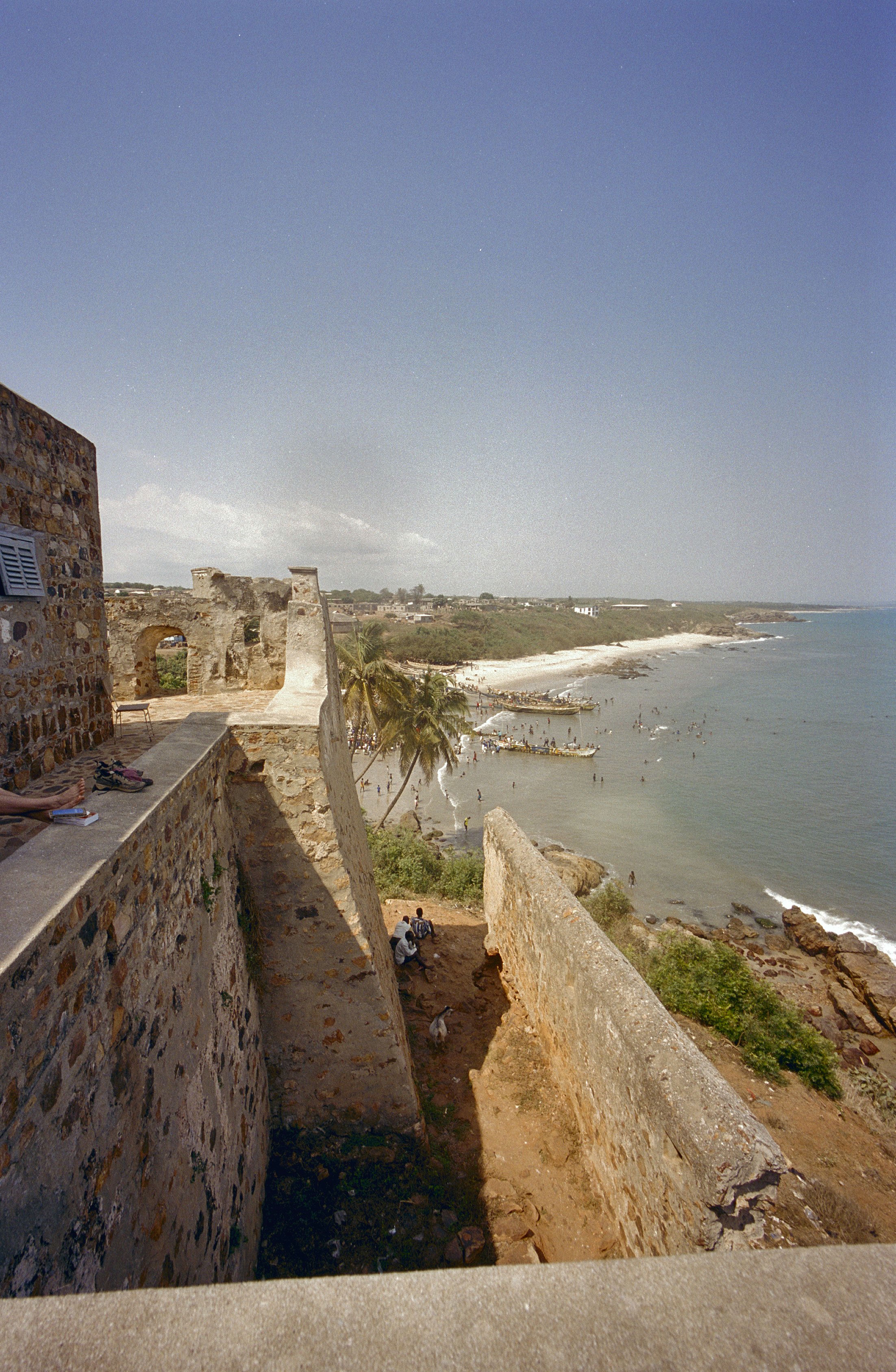
- View of the coast from Fort Good Hope

- Location within Ghana
- Coordinates: 5°23′16″N 0°29′33″W
- Country: Ghana
- Region: Central Region
- District: Awutu Senya East
- Time zone: GMT
  - Summer (DST): GMT

Senya Beraku is a residential area in the Awutu Senya West District of the Central Region of Ghana. Senya Beraku is the site of Fort Good Hope.The indigines of Senya Beraku are Guan people, Ghana's known indigenous group.

== See also ==
- Apiba Festival
