= Winneba =

Winneba Simpa
- Town
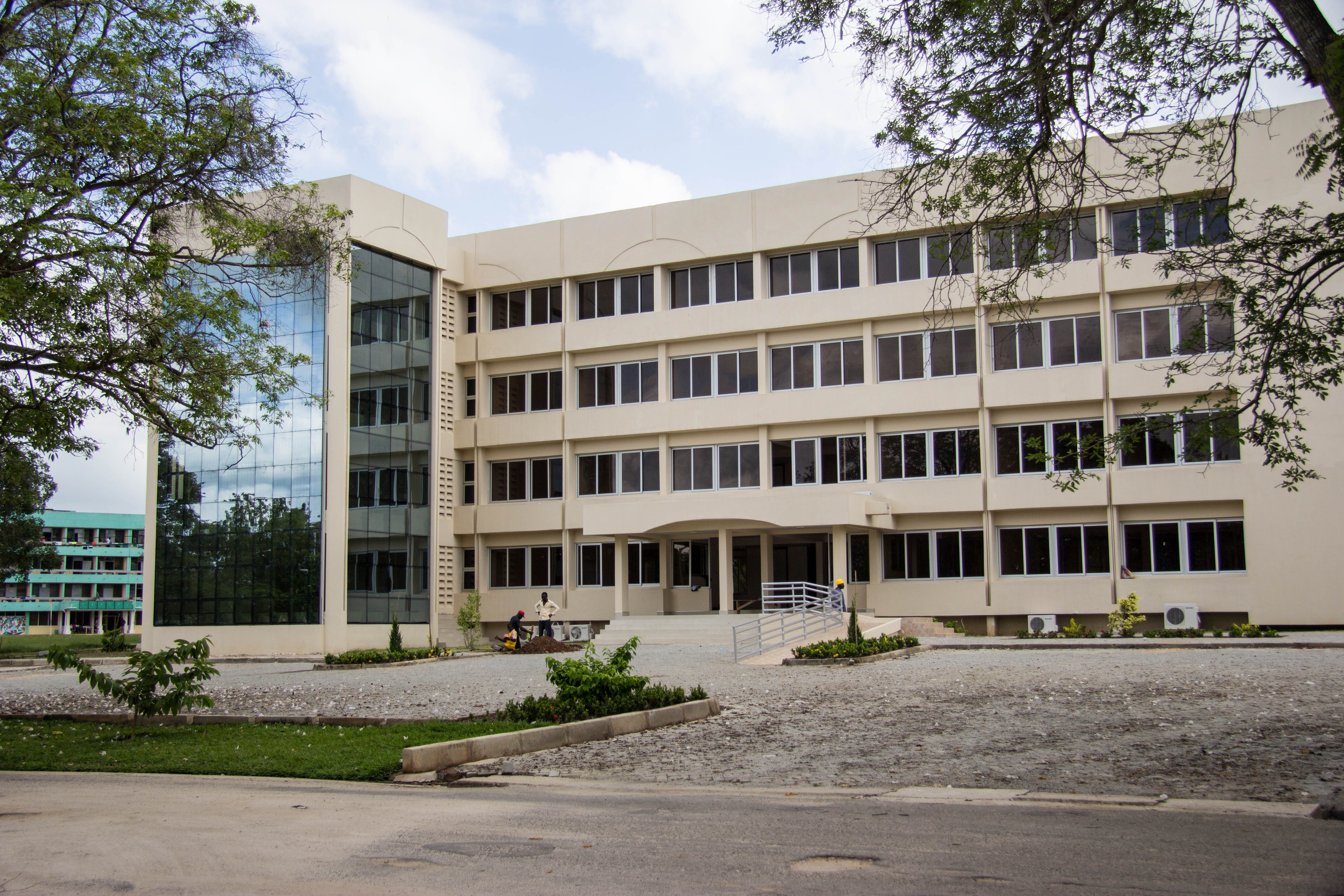
- North Campus of University of Education, Winneba

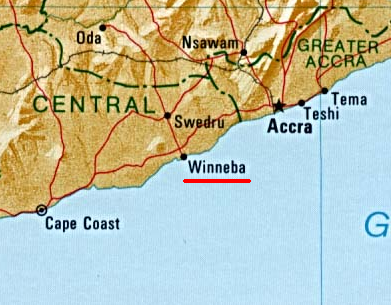
- Winneba is located 55 km west of Accra and 140 km east of Cape Coast

- Location of Winneba in Central region, South Ghana
- Coordinates: 5°21′00″N 0°37′30″W
- Country: Ghana
- Region: Central Region
- District: Effutu Municipal District

Population (2013)
  - Total: 55,331
- Time zone: GMT
  - Summer (DST): GMT

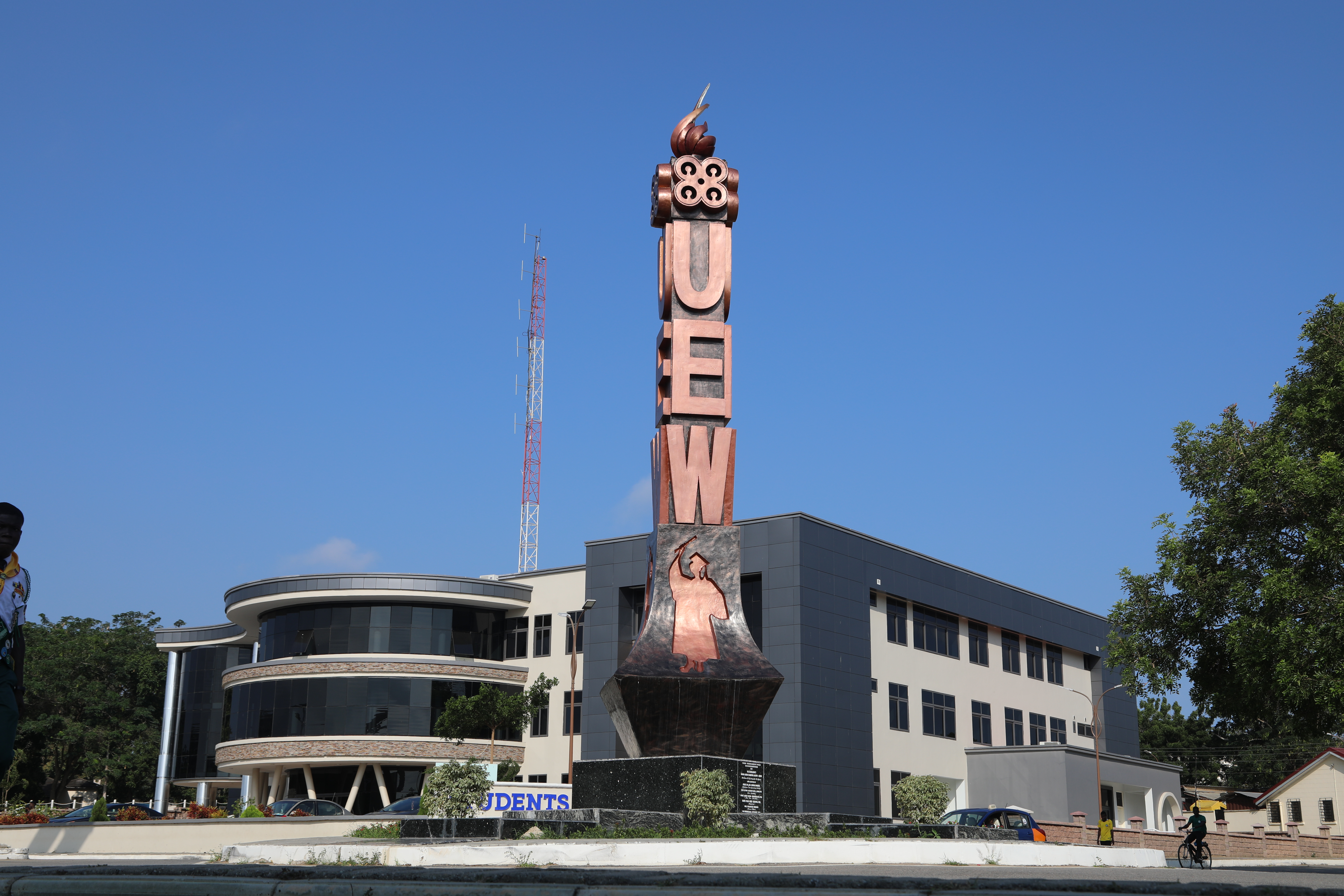
The student Centre of UEW

Winneba is a town and the capital of Effutu Municipal District in Central Region of South Ghana led by Ghartey VII. Winneba has a population of 60,331. Winneba, traditionally known as Simpa, is a historic fishing port in south Ghana, lying on the south coast, 140 kilometres (90 mi) east of Cape Coast. The current member of parliament is Alexander Kwamina Afenyo-Markin.

== History ==
From pre-colonial times through the establishment of the British colony the Gold Coast, (Effutu) Winneba served as a port town. Fort Winneba was built here.

The people of Winneba (Efutu) were led by their fearless spiritual leader and warrior, Kwamena Gyarteh Ayirebi-Gyan with the support of a large youthful militia called the Asafo Groups made up of both men and women. He ensured that his people were well protected from external attacks by other migrating families, clans, diseases or want of food.

== Industry and culture ==
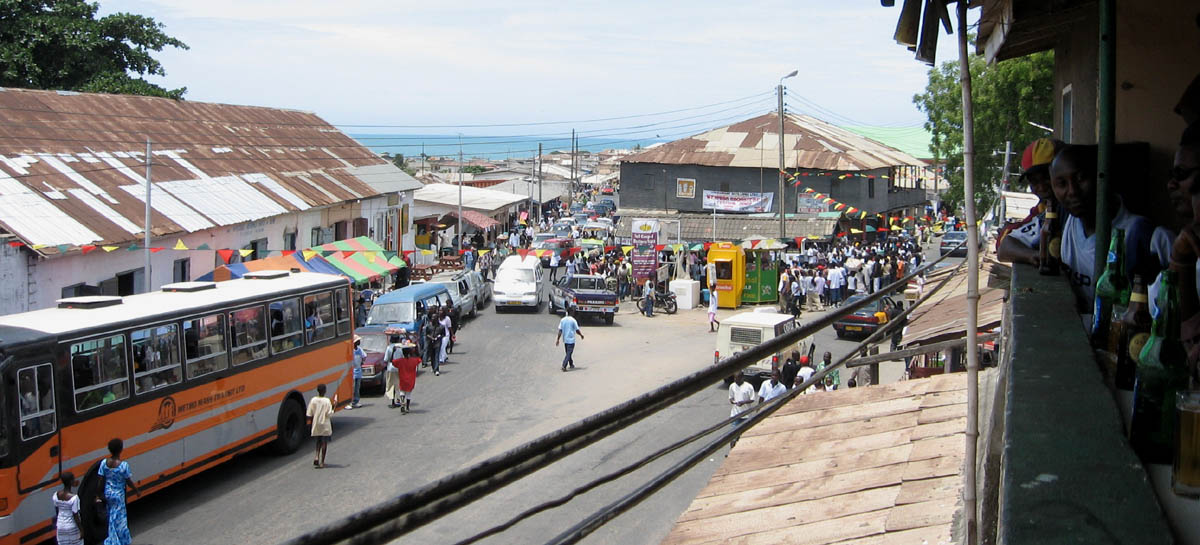
Winneba during Aboakyer festival

The main industries of Winneba are fishing and services. Winneba is known for the Aboakyer deer-hunting festival in and its New Year fancy dress carnival/masquerading festival. The town has a rich musical tradition and currently boasts of several renowned musical groups in the country, including the Winneba Youth Choir, the Osimpam Ompeh group, and the Akoo show Choir.

== Education ==
Winneba Senior High School is the only major public secondary cycle educational institute available in this town.

The University of Education, Winneba has its three main campus in Winneba (South Campus, Central Campus, and North Campus).

== Festivals ==
Masquerade festival, popularly known as fancy dress, is held every new year among the people of Winneba. Its attracts a large number of tourists from around the world. It is the second most popular festival in Winneba. The festival is held in a football park at the North campus of the University of Education, Winneba by the five main masquerade groups. They come together and compete amongst themselves to select the winner for the trophy. These groups consist of Nobles as number one, Egya as number two, Tumus as number three and Red Cross as number four and Royals as number 5.

Aboakyer festival is a bushbuck hunting festival celebrated by the people of Winneba in the Central Region of Ghana. The name Aboakyer translates as 'hunting for game or animal in Fante dialect as spoken by the people of the Central region. The institution of the festival was to commemorate the migration of the Simpafo (the aboriginal name of the people of Winneba).

The Aboakyer Festival is being celebrated by the people of Effutu, who were among the earliest settlers of Ghana, for an uncountable number of years. It sprang up when the Effutu people departed from Western Sudan and journeyed to the present town of Winneba in the Central Region of Ghana. They came with their god, known as Penkye Otu.

== Neighborhoods ==
Winneba has a number of neighborhoods stretching from coastal areas to non-coastal areas. It also includes rural areas which provide farm power aside from the fishing activity employed by the inhabitants of the coasts. Below are some of the well-known neighborhoods of Winneba.

=== Urban areas ===
- Winneba Junction
- Lowcost
- Yepemso
- Nkwantanan
- Kundum
- Abasraba
- Girls-Ase
- Kojo-Beedu
- Gyatakrom
- Central Campus
- North Campus
- South Campus
- Zongo
- Sankor
- Water-works
- Sekegyano
- Town Hall

=== Rural areas ===
- Essuekyir
- Woarabeba
- Gyaahadze
- Osubonpanyin
- Ateitu
- Atakyedo
- Gyangyanadze
- Kookrom

== Climate ==
Climate data for Winneba
Month	Jan	Feb	Mar	Apr	May	Jun	Jul	Aug	Sep	Oct	Nov	Dec	Year
Mean daily maximum °C (°F)	33.0 (91.4)	32.3 (90.1)	31.9 (89.4)	31.1 (88.0)	34.4 (93.9)	29.6 (85.3)	28.3 (82.9)	29.0 (84.2)	29.4 (84.9)	30.6 (87.1)	32.5 (90.5)	42.0 (107.6)	42.0 (107.6)
Mean daily minimum °C (°F)	13.3 (55.9)	13.6 (56.5)	11.9 (53.4)	10.8 (51.4)	14.5 (58.1)	13.5 (56.3)	15.5 (59.9)	14.2 (57.6)	12.7 (54.9)	16.8 (62.2)	15.7 (60.2)	12.1 (53.8)	11.9 (53.4)
Average precipitation mm (inches)	15 (0.6)	7.6 (0.3)	10 (0.4)	38 (1.5)	220 (8.7)	66 (2.6)	38 (1.5)	7.6 (0.3)	25 (1.0)	58 (2.3)	5.1 (0.2)	23 (0.9)	520 (20.3)
Source: Meoweather.com

== Sister cities ==
List of sister cities of Winneba, designated by Sister Cities International:

	Country	City	County / District / Region / State	Date	Ref.
(United States)	USA	Birmingham, AL	Alabama	November 15, 2009	
(United States)	USA	Charlottesville, VA	Virginia	August 2, 2010	
(United States)	USA	Lowell, MA	Massachusetts		

== Personalities ==
- Alex Quaison-Sackey, Ghanaian diplomat
- Mike Hammah, Former member of parliament for Effutu Municipal
- Alexander Kwamina Afenyo-Markin, a current member of parliament for Effutu Municipal
- Kojo Botsio, Ghanaian politician
- Jacob Plange-Rhule, physician and academic
- Sandra "Alexandrina" Don-Arthur, professional makeup artist and Vlogger

== Notable Institutions ==
- University of Education, Winneba
- Winneba Community Nursing Training College
- Perez University College
- Winneba Senior High School
- Winneba School of Business
- Winneba Vocational Training Institute
- Winneba Trauma and Specialist Hospital
- Winneba Fire Station
- nyce fm
- osimpam fm
- Radio peace
- Radio Windibay

== Gallery ==
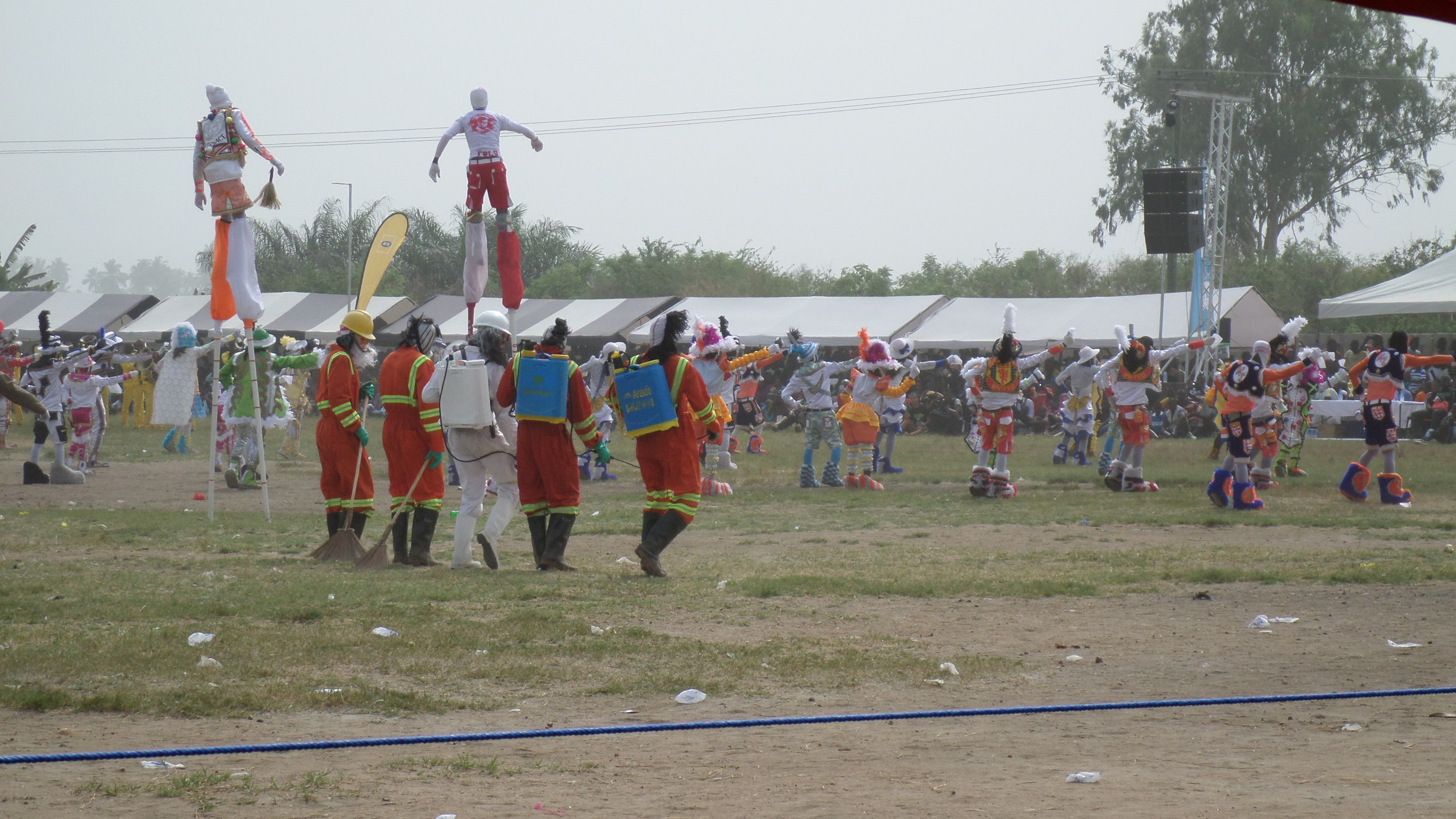
Fancy_festival_Winneba_8

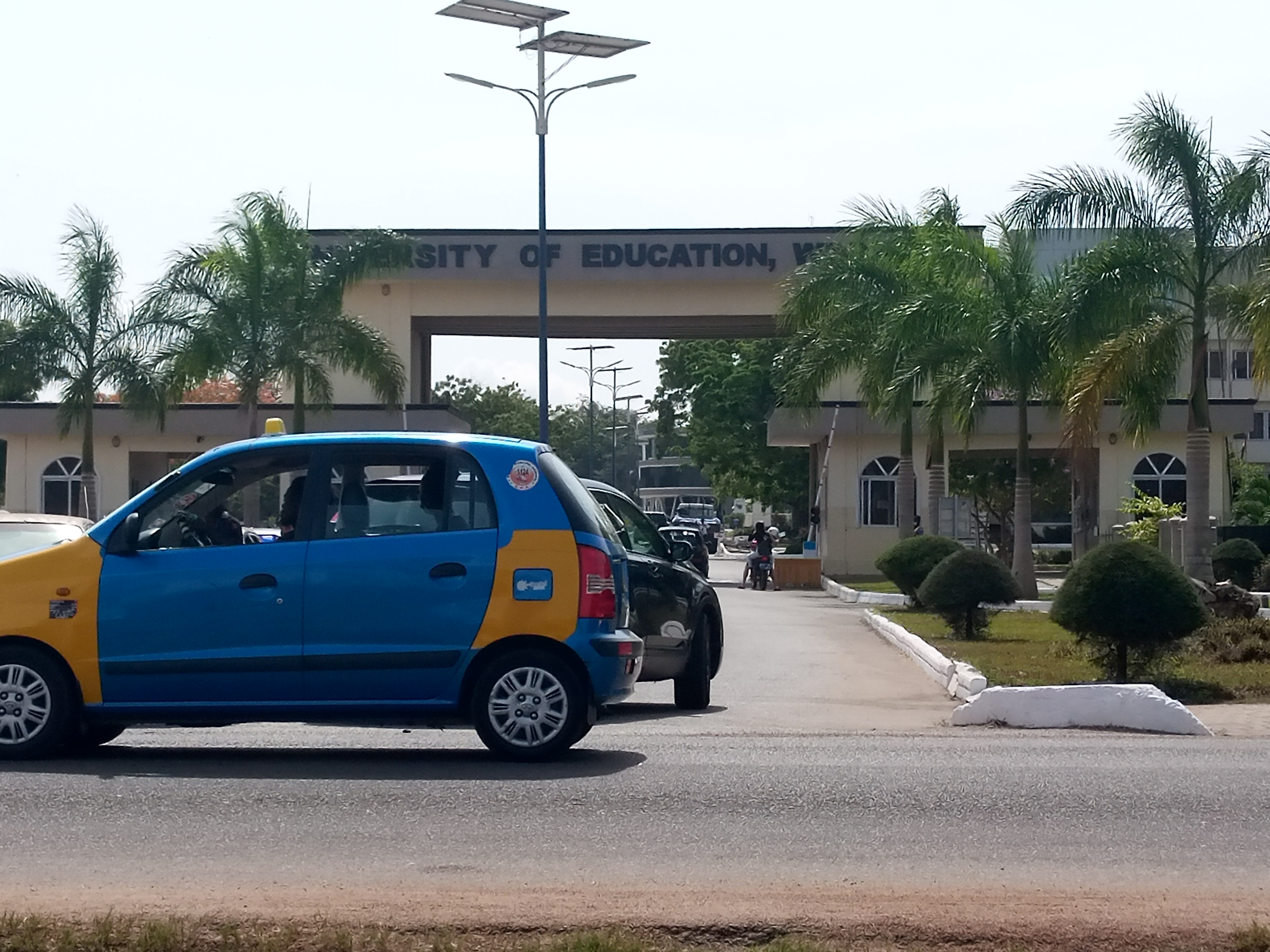
main entrance of north campus

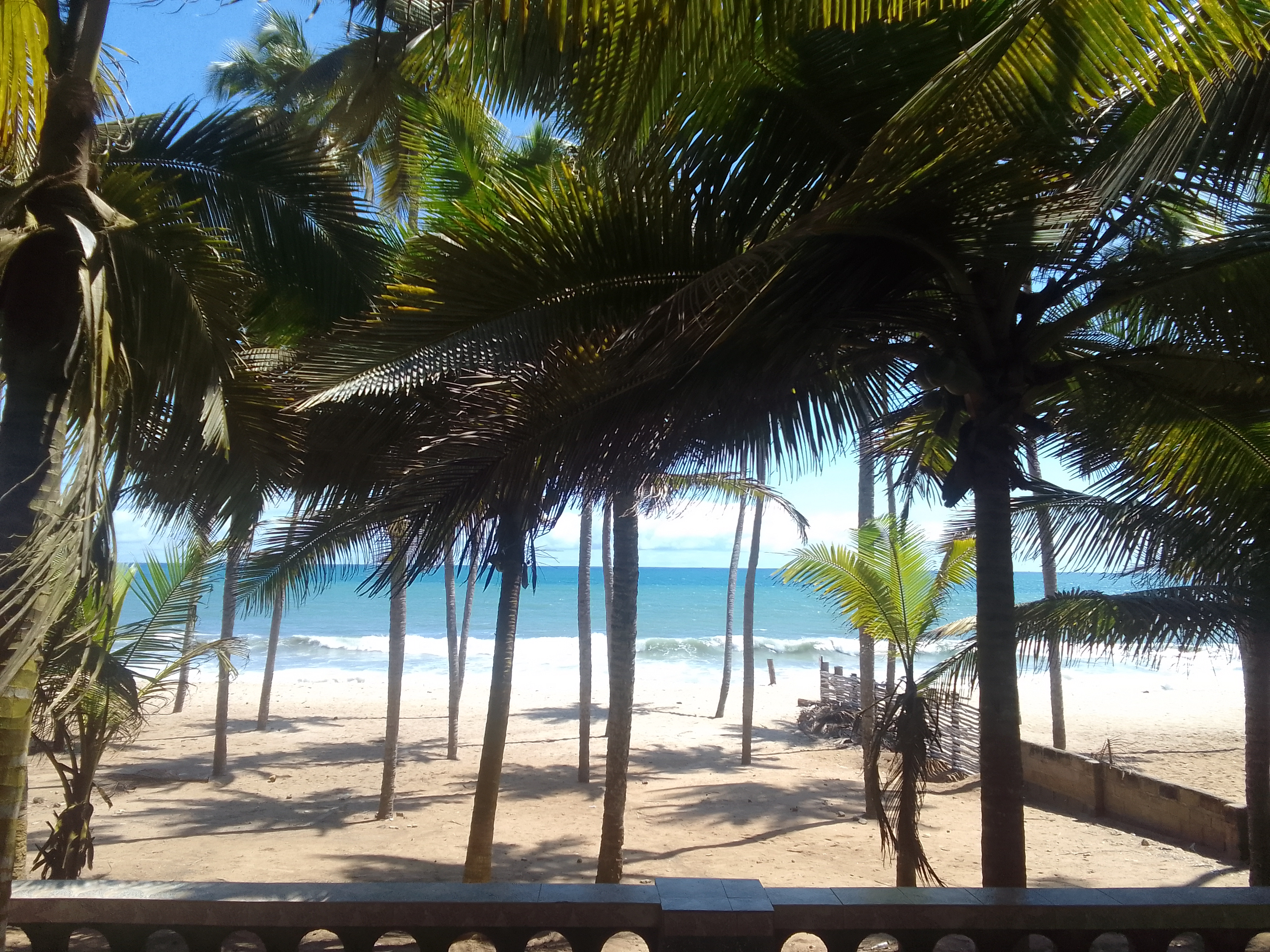
winneba beach

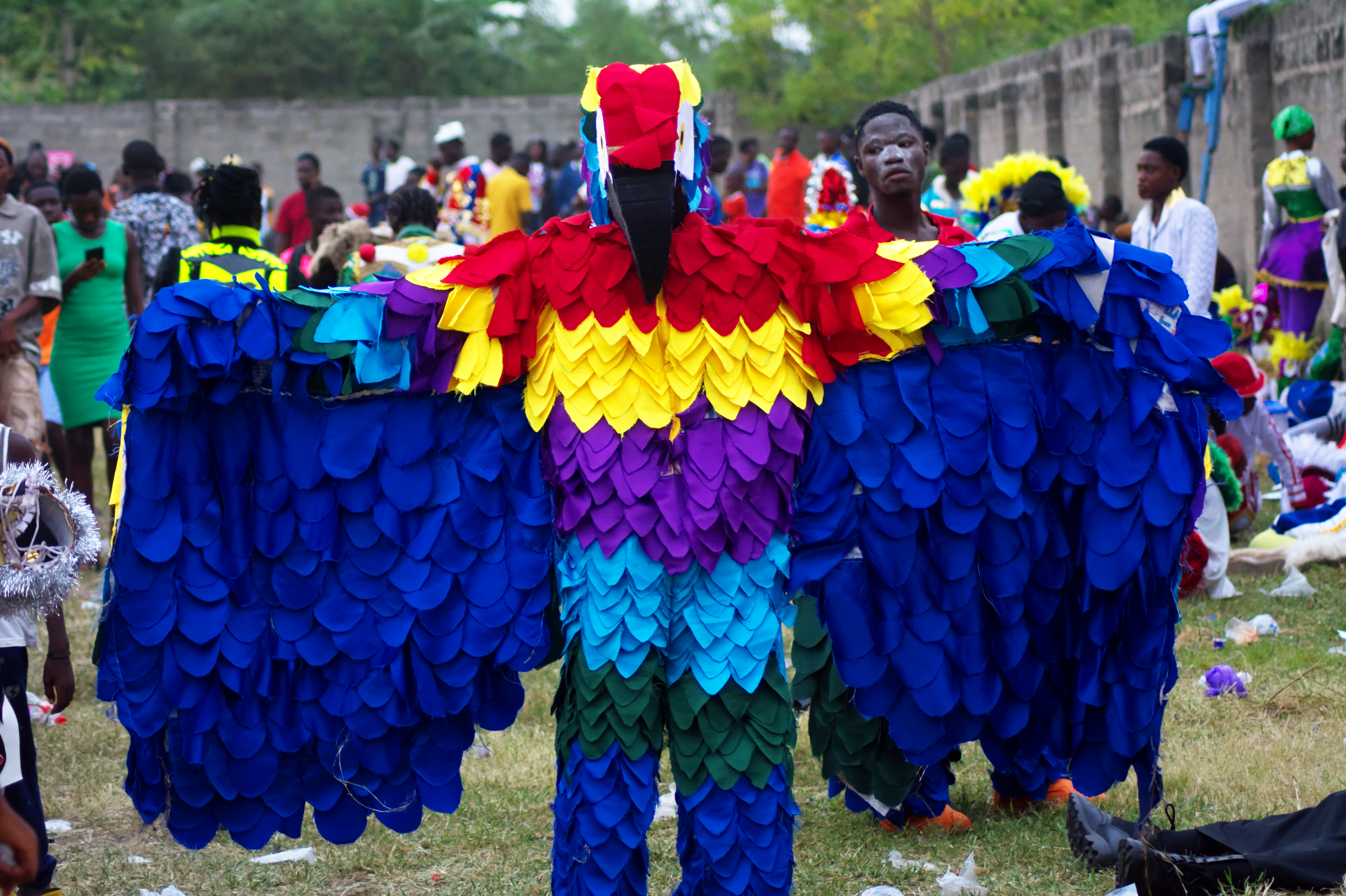
winneba masquerade festival

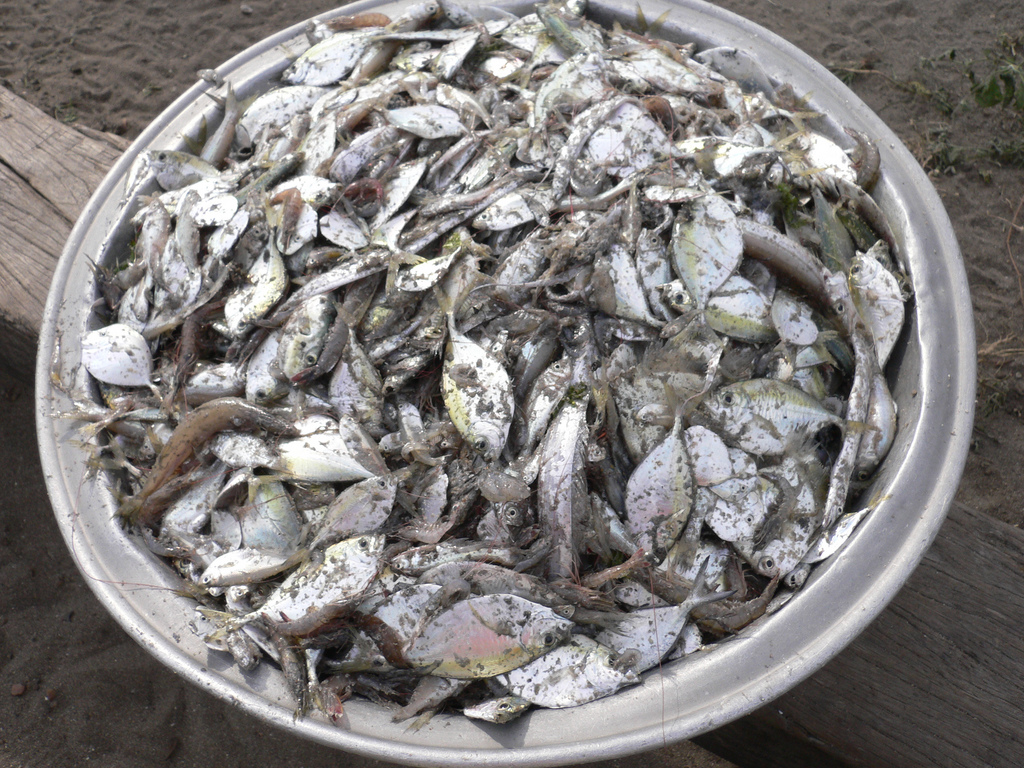
fishes in winneba

== See also ==
- Aboakyer festival
