= Awutu Breku =

- Town and District Capital
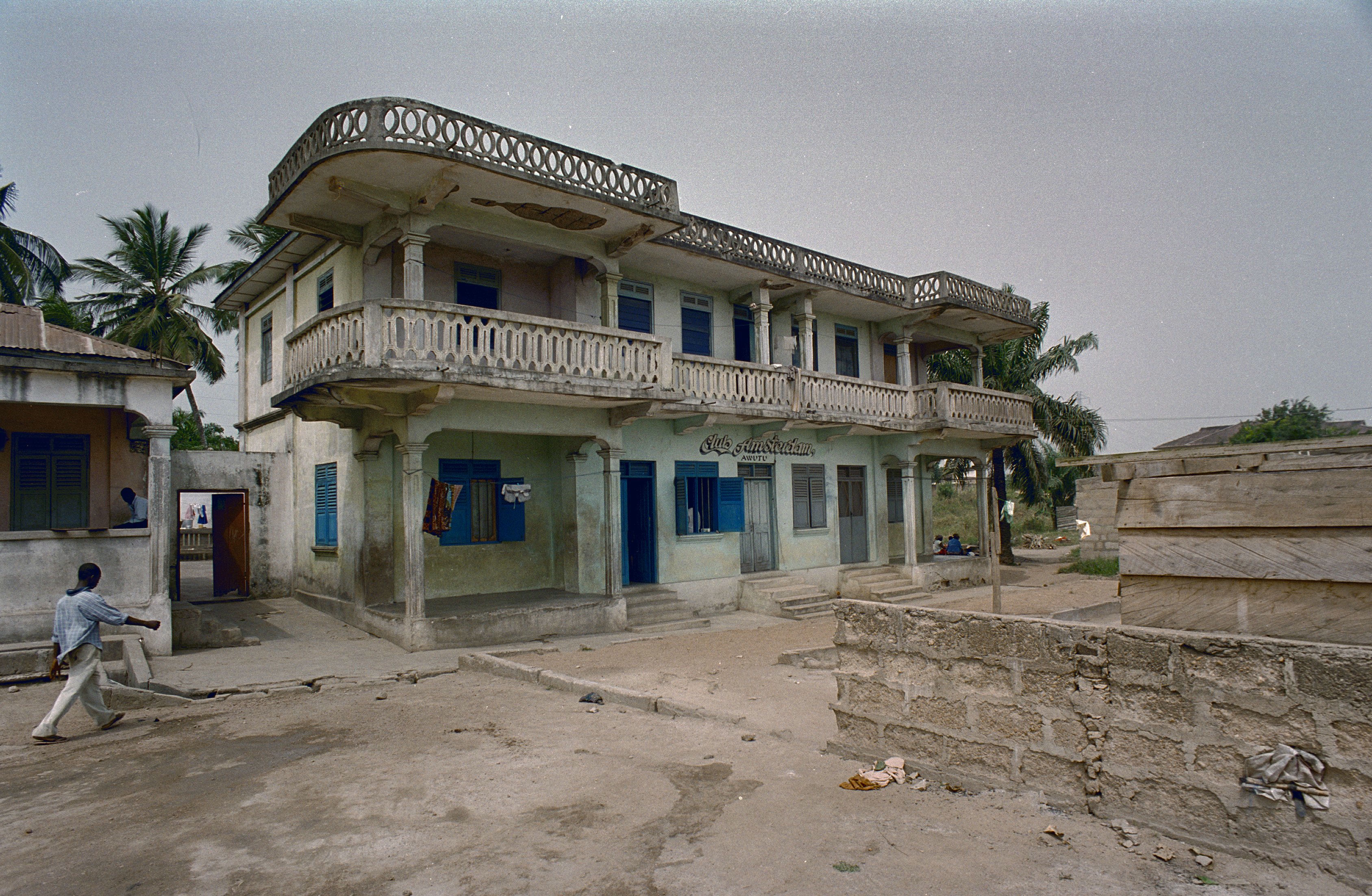
- Club Amsterdam in Awutu

- Location of Awutu Breku in Central Region
- Coordinates: 5°42′N 0°37′W
- Country: Ghana
- Region: Central Region
- District: Awutu Senya District
- Demonym: Awutu Brekuan
- Time zone: GMT
  - Summer (DST): GMT
- Ethnicity: Guan people

Awutu Breku is a small town and is the capital of Awutu Senya district in the Central Region of Ghana, Ghana.
