= Awutu Senya East (municipal district) =

Awutu Senya East Municipal District
- Municipal District
- Districts of Central Region

- Location of Awutu Senya East Municipal District within Central
- Coordinates: 5°31′12″N 0°28′48″W
- Country: Ghana
- Region: Central
- Capital: Kasoa

Population (2021)
  - Total: 236,527
- Time zone: UTC+0 (GMT)
- ISO 3166 code: GH-CP-AS

Awutu Senya East Municipal District is one of the twenty-two districts in Central Region, Ghana. It was part of the larger Awutu Senya District from 29 February 2008 until 28 June 2012, when the eastern part of the district was split off to create Awutu Senya East District (and, by association, Awutu Senya West District). The East District was later elevated to municipal district assembly status on 15 March 2018 to become Awutu Senya East Municipal District. The municipality is located in the southeast part of Central Region and has Kasoa as its capital town.
