= Abraham Dwuma Odoom =

Ghanaian politician

Hon. Abraham Dwuma Odoom MP

Member of the Ghana Parliament for Twifo Atti-Morkwa Constituency
- In office 7 January 2017 – 6 January 2021
- Succeeded by: David T. D. Vondee
- President: Nana Akuffo-Addo

Personal details
- Born: 11 August 1952 (age 74) Twifo Ayaase, Ghana
- Party: New Patriotic Party
- Education: Harvard University, University of Ghana
- Occupation: Politician
- Profession: Accountant
- Committees: Parliamentary Select Committee on Food and Agriculture (Vice Chairman)

Abraham Dwuma Odoom is a Ghanaian politician and member of the Seventh Parliament of the Fourth Republic of Ghana representing the Twifo Atti-Morkwa Constituency in the Central Region on the ticket of the New Patriotic Party. He is credited with developing a concept note behind Nigeria's 'successful' rice production story.

== Early life and education ==
Odoom was born on 11 August 1952 and hails from Twifo Ayaase in the Central Region of Ghana. He has a certificate in Political and Economic Change from the J. F. Kennedy School of Governance, Harvard University in 2007 and also a Diploma in Accounting from the University of Ghana in 1979.

== Career ==
Odoom was a Lead Consultant in Cocoa Redevelopment from June 2016 to 6 January 2017. He also worked at the Ministry of Agriculture and Natural Resources in Akwa Ibom State in Nigeria. He was also a Policy Advisor at Bill/Melinda Gates/J. A Kufuor Foundation Competitive African Rice Initiative Project in Nigeria from 2014 to May 2016.

== Politics ==
Odoom is a member of the New Patriotic Party. He was the member of parliament for Twifo Atti-Morkwa Constituency in the Central Region of Ghana from 2017 to 2021.

=== 2016 election ===
During the 2016 Ghanaian general election, Odoom won the Twifo Atti Morkwa Constituency parliamentary seat. He won with 21,231 votes making 58.2% of the total votes cast whilst the NDC parliamentary candidate Samuel Ato Amoah had 14,887 votes making 40.8% of the total votes cast, the PPP parliamentary candidate Abu Ayuba had 273 votes making 0.8% of the total votes cast and the CPP parliamentary candidate Ebenezer Appiah had 115 vote making 0.3% of the total votes cast.

=== Minister ===
Odoom is the former Deputy Minister for Health during the Kufuor administration.

He is the former Deputy Minister for Local Government.

=== Committee ===
Odoom was a member and Vice Chairman of the Parliamentary Select Committee on Food and Agriculture.

== Personal life ==
Odoom is a Christian.

== Awards ==
In 2004, he emerged the best District Chief Executive for the then Twifo Hemang Lower Denkyira District Assembly in Ghana.

In November 2019, he was presented with a Lifetime Achievement Honorary Award.

== Philanthropy ==
In June 2018, he presented motorbikes to teachers and agriculture extension officers in his constituency.
