= Gomoa District =

- Former District
- Districts of Central Region

- Location of Gomoa District within Central
- Coordinates: 5°16′44.5″N 0°44′23.0″W
- Country: Ghana
- Region: Central
- Capital: Apam

Area
  - Total: 891 km^{2} (344 sq mi)
- Time zone: UTC+0 (GMT)
- ISO 3166 code: GH-CP-GO

Gomoa District is a former district that was located in Central Region, Ghana. Originally created as an ordinary district assembly in 1988, it was split off into two new districts: Gomoa West District (capital: Apam) and Gomoa East District (capital: Gomoa Afransi) on 29 February 2008. The district assembly is located in the southeast part of Central Region and has Apam as its capital town.

== History ==
Gomoa District has been mainly inhabited by the Akan-subgroup Fantes, who are mainly farmers and fishermen.

Apam is the capital of Gomoa District. The native name for this region is “Apaa.” Most of the people living in Apam were engaged in the fishing industry, supplying fish to surrounding landlocked villages. The town also has a vibrant salt industry in Apam, where salt is harvetsed from the lagoon. There is a secondary school and a hospital that serves the people of Apam and the surrounding areas.

One of the main attractions in Apam is a fort built by the Portuguese, called Fort Patience.

The people of Apam celebrate the "Akwambo" festival, which is celebrated to mark the time when their ancestors made their way to Apam. Akwambo literally means "the making of a way".

== Sources ==
- "Gomoa District". Statoids.
- District: Gomoa District
