= Gomoa Central District =

- Former District
- Districts of Central Region

- Location of Gomoa Central District within Central
- Coordinates: 5°30′36.72″N 0°44′51.72″W
- Country: Ghana
- Region: Central
- Capital: Gomoa Afransi

Population (2021)
  - Total: 83,610
- Time zone: UTC+0 (GMT)
- ISO 3166 code: GH-CP-GC

Gomoa Central District is one of the twenty-two districts in Central Region, Ghana. Originally it was formerly part of the then-larger Gomoa District in 1988, until the eastern part of the district was split off to create the first Gomoa East District, with Gomoa Afransi as its capital town, on 29 February 2008 (which was later split off into two new districts on 15 March 2018: Gomoa Central District (capital: Gomoa Afransi), and the present Gomoa East District (capital: Potsin)); thus the remaining part has been renamed as Gomoa West District. With its capital at Apam. The Gomoa East district assembly is located in the southeast part of Central Region and has Gomoa Potsin as its capital town. In 2018 it was elevated to Municipal Assembly. Gomoa East Metropolitan Assembly with Gomoa Potsin as its capital.
