= Hemang-Lower Denkyira (district) =

Hemang-Lower Denkyira District
- District
- Districts of Central Region

- Location of Hemang-Lower Denkyira within Central
- Coordinates: 5°29′3.84″N 1°31′55.92″W
- Country: Ghana
- Region: Central
- Capital: Twifo Hemang
- Time zone: UTC+0 (GMT)
- ISO 3166 code: GH-CP-__

Hemang-Lower Denkyira District is one of the twenty-two districts in Central Region, Ghana. Originally it was formerly part of the then-larger Twifo/Heman/Lower Denkyira District; until the southeast area of the district was split off to create Hemang-Lower Denkyira District on 28 June 2012; thus the remaining part has been renamed as Twifo-Atti Morkwa District. The district assembly is the northwest part of Central Region and has Twifo Hemang as its capital town.
