= Andrew Kingsford Mensah =

Ghanaian politician (born 1955)

Hon. Andrew Kingsford Mensah

Member of Ghana parliament for Abura-Asebu-Kwamankese constituency
- In office 7 January 2005 – 6 January 2009
- President: John Agyekum Kufour
- Preceded by: Harry Halifax-Hayford
- Succeeded by: Anthony Christian Dadzie

Personal details
- Born: 26 November 1955 (age 70) Abura-Asebu-Kwamankese, Central Region Gold Coast (now Ghana)
- Party: New Patriotic Party
- Education: University of Cape Coast
- Occupation: Politician
- Profession: District chief executive

Andrew Kingsford Mensah (born 26 November 1955) is a Ghanaian politician and member of the Fourth Parliament of the Fourth Republic of Ghana representing the Abura-Asebu-Kwamankese Constituency in the Central Region.

== Early life and education ==
Mensah was born in Abura-Asebu-Kwamankese in the Central Region of Ghana on 26 November 1955. He attended the University of Cape Coast and obtained a Degree in Masters of Arts( Education).

== Career ==
Mensah was a member of Parliament for the Abura-Asebu-Kwamankese Constituency from 2005 to 2009 in the Central Region of Ghana. He also is a District Chief Executive for the Abura-Asebu-Kwamankese District.

== Politics ==
Mensah was first elected to Parliament during the December 2004 Ghanaian General elections on the Ticket of the New Patriotic Party as a member of Parliament for the Abura-Asebu-Kwamankese Constituency in the Central Region when he won with 19,196 votes out of the 35,923 valid votes cast, representing 53.40%.

== Personal life ==
Mensah is a Christian.
