= Elvis Morris Donkoh =

Ghanaian politician (born 1983)

Hon. Elvis Morris Donkoh MP
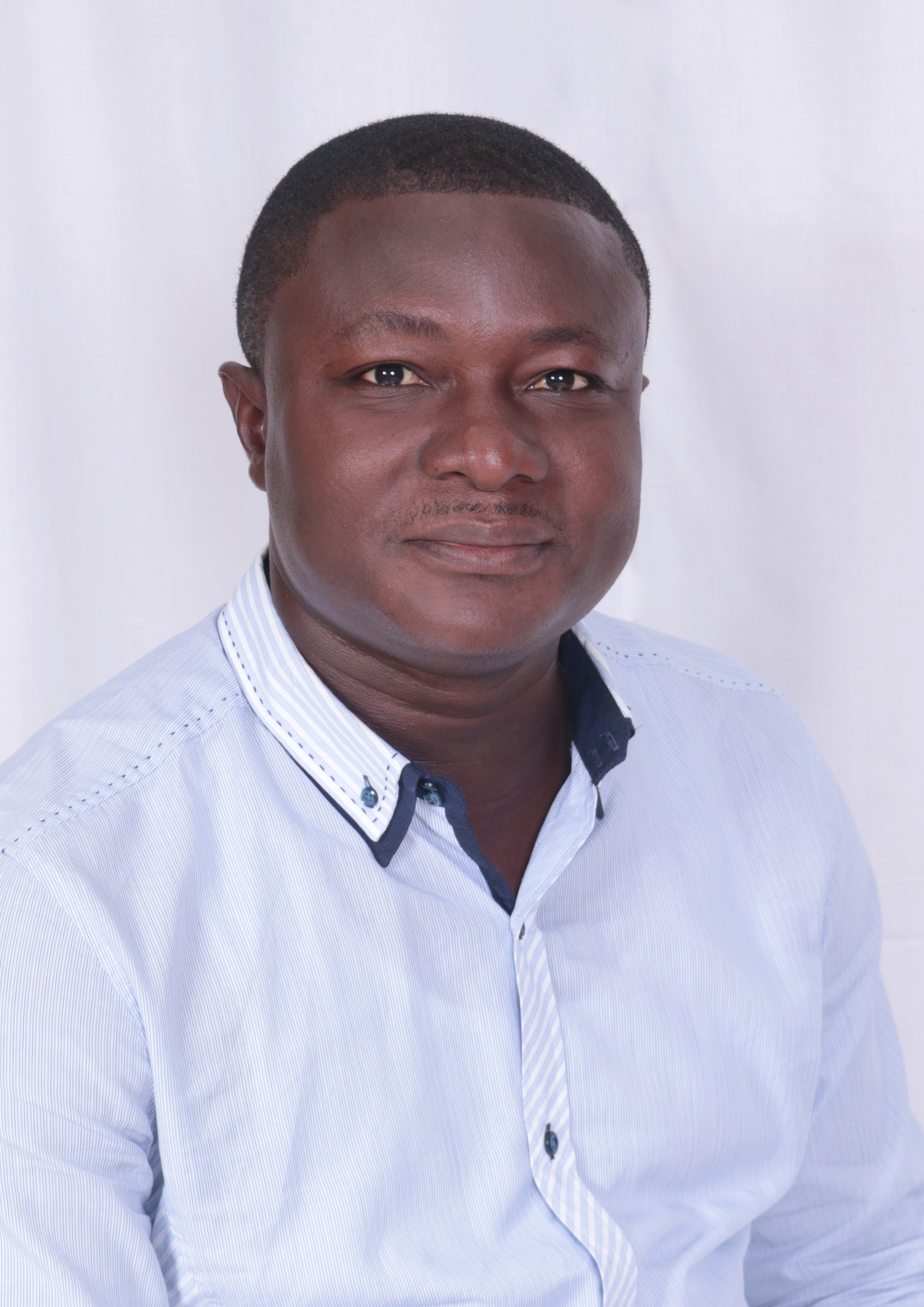

Member of the Ghana Parliament for Abura-Asebu-Kwamankese Constituency

Personal details
- Born: 25 February 1983 (age 43) Cape Coast, Central region, Ghana
- Party: New Patriotic Party

Elvis Morris Donkoh (born 25 February 1983) is a Ghanaian politician who was a member of the Seventh Parliament of the Fourth Republic of Ghana and currently a member of the Eighth Parliament of the Fourth Republic of Ghana representing the Abura-Asebu-Kwamankese Constituency in the Central Region on the ticket of the New Patriotic Party.

== Early life and education ==
Elvis Morris Donkoh was born on 25 February 1983 and hails from Cape Coast in the Central Region of Ghana. Elvis Morris Donkoh obtained his Diploma (Youth In Development Work) from the University of Ghana in the year 2008 and Post Graduate Diploma (Project and Quality Management) from Business University of Costa Rica in the year 2016.

== Career ==
Elvis Morris Donkoh is the Executive Director of Alliance for Youth Development. He is now working as the Member of Parliament (MP) for Abura-Asebu-Kwamankese Constituency in the Central Region on the ticket of the New Patriotic Party.

== Political life ==
Elvis Morris Donkoh contested and won the 2016 NPP parliamentary primaries for Abura-Asebu-Kwamankese Constituency in the Central Region of Ghana. Elvis Morris Donkoh proceeded to win the parliamentary seat in his constituency (Abura-Asebu-Kwamankese Constituency) during the 2016 Ghanaian general elections on the ticket of the New Patriotic Party to join the Seventh (7th) Parliament of the Fourth Republic of Ghana with 22,245 votes (50.7%) against Samuel K. Hayford of the National Democratic Congress who had 20,508 votes (46.7%), Clement Abaidoo of the Progressive People's Party (PPP - Ghana) who had 1,054 votes (2.4%) and Kwame Edu Ofori of the People's National Convention (PNC - Ghana) who also had 116 votes (0.3%).

Elvis Morris Donkoh again contested and won the 2020 NPP parliamentary primaries for Abura-Asebu-Kwamankese Constituency in the Central Region of Ghana with 475 votes against Kobina Nyanteh who had 220 votes. Elvis Morris Donkoh again proceeded to win in the 2020 Ghanaian general elections on the ticket of the New Patriotic Party to join the Eighth (8th) Parliament of the Fourth Republic of Ghana with 25,048 votes (49.2%) against Felix Ofosu Kwakye of the National Democratic Congress who had 24,872 votes (48.8%) and Francis Eghan of the Ghana Union Movement (GUM) who had also 1,001 votes (2.0%).

=== Committees ===
Elvis Morris Donkoh is a member (Vice Chairperson) of Mines and Energy Committee. He is also a member of Privileges Committee as well as the Trade, Industry and Tourism Committee of the Eighth (8th) Parliament of the Fourth Republic of Ghana.

== Personal life ==
Elvis Morris Donkoh is a Christian and a member of the Seventh Day Adventist Church (SDA).
