= Cecilia Akua Edu =

Cecilia Akua Edu is a Ghanaian politician and member of the first parliament of the fourth republic of Ghana representing Abura/Asebu/Kwamankese constituency under the membership of the National Democratic Congress (NDC).

After serving his four years tenure in office, Cecillia lost his candidacy to his fellow party comrade J.E. Afful. He defeated Andrew Kingsford Mensah of the National Patriotic Party (NPP) who polled 13,088 votes which was equivalent to 28.50% of the total valid votes cast and Emmanuel F. Appiah-Kubi of the Convention People's Party (CPP) who polled 235 votes which was equivalent to 0.50% of the total valid votes cast at the 1996 Ghanaian general elections. J.E. Afful polled 20,262 votes which was equivalent to 44.10% of the total valid votes cast. He was thereafter elected on 7 January 1997.
