= Apam Senior High School =

Public high school in Apam, Gomoa West, Ghana

Location
- Apam; Central Region; Apam 233; Ghana; 5.521086°N 0.418682°W

Information
- Type: Public High school
- Motto: Obra pa gya Owura kwan
- Founded: 20 February 1953; 73 years ago
- Status: active
- School district: Gomoa West District
- Oversight: Ministry of Education
- Head of school: Comfort Essah-Amoaful (Mrs)
- Gender: Boys and Girls(mixed school)
- Age: 14 to 18
- Classes offered: General Science, General Arts, Business Visual Arts
- Houses: 10
- Colours: Yellow and Green
- Slogan: Obrapa! Gya Owura Kwan.
- Nickname: Apamites

Apam Senior High School popularly known as "GREAT APASS" is a co-educational senior high school at Apam in the Gomoa West District of the Central Region of Ghana founded in 1953.

== History ==
Apam Senior High School, in the Zone B District of the Central region of Ghana, was established in 1953 at Apaa Paado plains, a suburb of Apam (a coastal town in the area) as a day school. The school had a very humble beginning under a cocoa shed and oak trees. It started under the management of Rev. J. W. DeGraft-Johnson with C. S. Arthur Hesse as the only teacher.

In 1960, the school relocated to its present site, Mbofra mfa Adwen, with a very grand and impressive opening ceremony performed by Lord Listowel, the last Governor of the then Gold Coast, now Ghana. The development of the school that led to the adoption of the name Great Apass was achieved under the leadership and aegis of the late Peter Augustus Owiredu. P.A. Owiredu took over as the headmaster from Rev. Degraft-Johnson in 1959 to 1981.

In 1964, the school had transitioned from an only-day school to a day and boarding school and had introduced Advanced Level subjects in the Arts and Sciences in addition to the Ordinary Level courses it offered. The school now accommodates over 2000 students.

== Academic programs ==
Apam Senior High School also functions within the standard three-year Senior High School (SHS) curriculum framework established by Ghana's National Council for Curriculum and Assessment (NaCCA). Currently, it runs six programs which include the following;

- Agriculture
- Business
- Home Economics
- Visual Arts
- General Arts
- General Science

== Former heads ==
Several leaders have served as heads of this school since its establishment which amounts to eight in number. The following are the heads of the school from its establishment to date.

- 1953 - 1958 – J. W. De-Graft Johnson
- 1959 - 1979 – P.A. Owiredu
- 1980 - 1988 – Sam Parry
- 1988 - 2004 – Esther Hamilton
- 2004 - 2016 – Archibold K. Fuah
- 2016 - 2019 – Nana E. C. Acqua
- 2019 to 2022 Jemima E. Arthur-Morrison (Mrs.)
- 2022 to date Comfort Essah-Amoaful (Mrs.)

== Notable alumni ==
Notable alumni include:-

- Nene Amegatcher, lawyer, academic and judge; active Justice of the Supreme Court of Ghana (2018 – 2023)
- Kwasi Anin-Yeboah, lawyer and judge; current Chief Justice of Ghana (2019 – 2023)
- Kojo Armah, diplomat, lawyer and politician
- Amerley Awua-Asamoa, Ghanaian diplomat
- Nana Kwame Bediako, real estate mogul, industrialist and philanthropist.
- David Dontoh, actor and television personality
- Guru, Ghanaian musician
- Samuel Inkoom of Black Stars
- Nii Ashie Kotey, judge and academic; active Justice of the Supreme Court of Ghana (2018 – 2023)
- Nana Kuffour, footballer
- Amoaku Obuadabang Larbi, Ghanaian patrician
- Aaron Mike Oquaye, politician; former Speaker of the Parliament of Ghana (2017 – 2020)
- Isaac Owusu-Mensah, political scientist
- Abeiku Quansah, former Ghana U-17 and U-18 player.
- Ato Quayson, Professor of English at Stanford University, formerly at New York University, and Professor and inaugural Director of the Centre for Diaspora Studies at the University of Toronto.
