= Ekumfi (Ghana parliament constituency) =

Constituency in the Central Region of Ghana

- constituency for the Parliament of Ghana
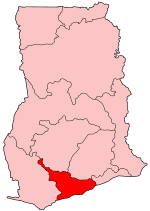
- District: Ekumfi District
- Region: Central Region of Ghana

Current constituency
- Party: National Democratic Congress
- MP: Ekow Othniel Kwainoe

Ekumfi is one of the constituency represented in the parliament of Ghana. It elects one Member of Parliament (MP) by the first past the poll system of election. Ekow Othniel Kwainoe is the member of parliament for the constituency. Ekumfi is located in the Ekumfi district of the Central region of Ghana. It was formerly part of the Mfantseman East Constituency.

== Member of Parliament ==
Election	Member	Party
2012	Abeiku Crentil	N.D.C
2016	Francis Kingsley Ato Codjoe	N.P.P

== See also ==
- List of Ghana Parliament constituencies
