= Margaret Naana Ackom =

Ghanaian politician

District Chief Executive of Gomoa East
- Incumbent
- Assumed office April 15, 2025
- Appointed by: President John Dramani Mahama
- Preceded by: Hon. Solomon Darko-Quarm

Personal details
- Born: Gomoa East District, Central Region, Ghana
- Party: National Democratic Congress (NDC)
- Education: BSc. Business Administration (Banking and Finance), KAAF University (2014)
- Occupation: Public administrator; Political figure; Women's rights advocate
- Known for: First female District Chief Executive of Gomoa East District

Margaret Naana Ackom is a Ghanaian public administrator, women's rights advocate, and political figure serving as the District Chief Executive (DCE) of the Gomoa East District in the Central Region of Ghana. Confirmed on 15 April 2025, she made history as the first woman to hold the position of District Chief Executive in Gomoa East since the district's creation.

She received unanimous approval from all 18 members of the Gomoa East District Assembly, a 100% endorsement, following her nomination by President John Dramani Mahama under Article 243(1) of the 1992 Constitution and Section 20(1) of the Local Governance Act, 2016 (Act 936).

Prior to her appointment, she served for over a decade as a Typist and Secretarial Services Officer at the Gomoa Central/East District Assembly and as the Central Regional Deputy Director of Welfare for the National Democratic Congress (NDC).

== Early life and education ==
Margaret Naana Ackom was born and raised in the Gomoa East District, Central Region of Ghana. She pursued her education within Ghana, building qualifications in business administration, information technology, and leadership development.

She holds a Bachelor of Science in Business Administration (Banking and Finance) from KAAF University, Ghana, awarded in 2014. Prior to her degree, she undertook studies in Internet, Browser, Coding Languages and Web Development at the Digital Career Institute (2013), a Leadership Strategic Network programme at KAAF University (2012), and computer proficiency training in Microsoft Office applications at GABCEE Computer Training and Business School (2009).

== Career ==
=== Civil service ===
Margaret Naana Ackom began her professional career in public administration. Following the completion of her National Service as a personnel with the Non-Formal Education and Complementary Education Agency (2015–2016), she served for fifteen years as a Typist and Secretarial Services Officer at the Gomoa Central/East District Assembly (2010–2025), developing deep institutional knowledge of local governance in the Gomoa area.

=== Political career ===
Ackom has been an active member of the National Democratic Congress (NDC) at both the branch and regional levels. Her political roles have included:

- Branch Executive, Potsin Junction B (2012)
- Member of NDC Election Monitoring Team (2016)
- Deputy Constituency Secretary Aspirant (2018)
- Akotsi Branch Women Organiser, Gomoa East Constituency (2018–present)
- Gomoa East Constituency Parliamentary Candidate Aspirant (2019)
- Member of the Gomoa East Communication Committee (2024)
- Welfare Committee Chairperson, Gomoa East (2024)
- Member of Central Regional Monitoring Team for Elections and Presidential Primaries
- Member of Central Regional Strategic Operations and Monitoring Teams
- Central Regional Deputy Director for Welfare, NDC (2023–2025)

=== District Chief Executive Appointment (2025–present) ===
On April 15, 2025, during a confirmation exercise carried out at the Assembly Hall in Gomoa Potsin, Naana Ackom was given a unanimous endorsement. All 18 members of the Gomoa East District Assembly, who are both elected and appointed by the government, voted in her favor, thus achieving a 100% confirmation rate. She was later sworn in by the Central Regional Minister, Hon. Ekow Panyin Eduamoah. Her confirmation was attended by several dignitaries, including the Member of Parliament for Gomoa East Constituency, Desmond Paitoo De-Graft; and traditional leaders from within the Gomoa East area.

Margaret Naana Ackom was nominated by President John Dramani Mahama to serve as District Chief Executive for Gomoa East District in April 2025. This nomination was aimed at ensuring that women were represented in local government administration in Ghana in conformity with Article 243 of the 1992 Constitution of Ghana.

In her acceptance speech, she pledged to work collaboratively with assembly members, traditional leaders, and stakeholders to address pressing challenges in the district, including inadequate school infrastructure, poor road networks, limited access to potable water, and insufficient hospital facilities.

Obrempong Akrampah, Omanhene of Gomoa, expressed optimism that her leadership would address critical challenges in the district including infrastructure deficits, youth unemployment, and sanitation, and assured her of his full traditional support.

Upon assuming office, Ackom identified several priority areas for development in the district, including the improvement of road networks, construction of adequate school infrastructure, and the improvement of access to potable water and healthcare facilities.

Her governance has been characterised by high levels of engagement with both the community and industry across several key areas:

=== Industrial collaboration ===
In February 2026, Ackom began a series of working visits to prominent industries operating within the district, including Focus Tech Company and Rikpat Company Ltd, as part of efforts to strengthen the relationship between the district assembly and the private sector.

=== Education ===
Ackom launched a scholarship scheme for high-performing students in the Basic Education Certificate Examination (BECE) and provided educational materials to students at various learning centres across the district.

=== Infrastructure ===
Her administration has pursued key infrastructure projects including the construction of classroom blocks in Potsin and Buduburam, and the "Operation Lighting Gomoa East" initiative aimed at improving street lighting across communities in the district.

=== Water crisis response ===
In October 2025, Ackom represented Gomoa East at a presentation of water storage tanks by Vice President Professor Jane Naana Opoku-Agyemang to five districts in the Central Region, which had been severely affected by a water crisis largely attributed to the impacts of illegal mining (galamsey) on water bodies. She expressed gratitude on behalf of the beneficiary assemblies and reported that the district was deploying road contractors and the Ghana National Fire Service to provide emergency water supply to affected communities.

=== Support for rice farmers ===
In May 2025, following the destruction of over 73 acres of rice farmland at Gomoa Okyereko caused by a bridge spillage during construction works on the Kasoa–Winneba Highway dualization, Ackom visited the affected farms, pledged compensation for affected farmers, and coordinated relief efforts. Her swift intervention was publicly commended by the Rice Farmers Association.

=== Economic development ===
In November 2025, Ackom launched the Gomoa East District Business, Artisans and Investment Expo at Gomoa Akotsi, providing a platform for businesses, artisans, farmer groups, financial institutions, government agencies, and development partners to build partnerships and trade ideas. The initiative was designed to position Gomoa East as a hub for investment and to showcase the innovation and talents of its residents, taking advantage of the district's coastal location, agricultural land, and proximity to Accra.

== Women's rights and social advocacy ==
Margaret Naana Ackom is known as a women's rights advocate within the Gomoa East District. She has consistently advocated for the rights and empowerment of women, children, persons with disabilities, and other marginalised groups. Her advocacy has focused on increasing women's participation in political and social processes through community mobilisation, media engagement, and networking.

As the first woman to serve as District Chief Executive of Gomoa East, she has committed to supporting the advancement of women in leadership and community development roles.

== Personal life ==
She is recognized for her ability to build and maintain effective relationships with traditional leaders, particularly with Obrempong Nyanful Krampah XI, who is the Omanhene of the Gomoa Ajumako Traditional Area.

== See also ==
- Gomoa East District
- Central Region, Ghana
- National Democratic Congress (Ghana)
- John Dramani Mahama
- District Chief Executive
- Local government in Ghana
