= Richard Gyan Mensah =

Ghanaian politician

Hon. Richard Gyan Mensah
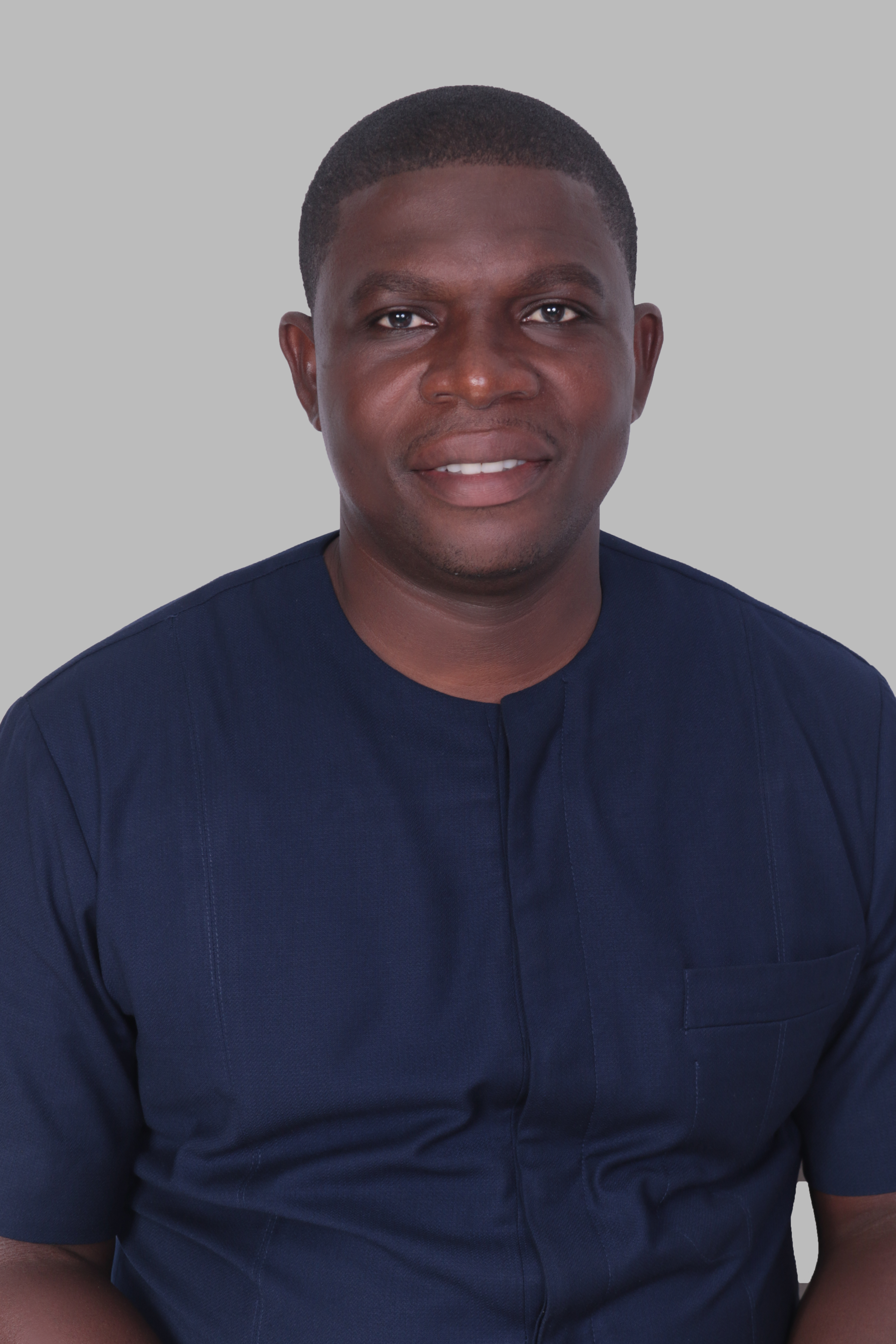

Member of Parliament for Gomoa West Constituency
- Incumbent
- Assumed office 7 January 2021
- President: Nana Akuffo Addo
- Preceded by: Alexander Kodwo Kom Abban

Personal details
- Born: 20 June 1982 (age 43) Gomoa Assin Brofoyedur, Ghana
- Party: National Democratic Congress
- Occupation: Politician
- Profession: Accountant
- Committees: Members Holding Offices of Profit Committee; Environment, Science and Technology Committee

Richard Gyan-Mensah (born 20 June 1982) is a Ghanaian politician and member of the National Democratic Congress. He is the member of parliament for the Gomoa West Constituency in the Central Region of Ghana.

== Early life and education ==
Gyan was born on 20 June 1982 and hails from Gomoa Assin Brofoyedur in the Central Region of Ghana. He had his SSSCE in 2001 where he studied business. He had his bachelor's degree in accounting in 2007. He further had his master's degree in accounting and finance in 2017.

== Career ==
Gyan was the General Manager for Desert Oil Limited. He was also a Mathematics and ICT Tutor at Gomoa Dominase D/A Junior High School. He was also a part time tutor at City Business College. He was also an Accountant at Trust Hands Auto Limited, the Assistant Accounts Manager for Union Oil Ghana Limited and Head of Finance and Planning for Petrosol Ghana Limited.

== Politics ==
Gyan is a member of the National Democratic Congress and currently the Member of Parliament for Gomoa West Constituency in the Central Region.

=== 2020 election ===
During the 2020 Ghanaian general election, he won the Gomoa West Constituency parliamentary seat. He won with 28,822 votes making 53.0% of the total votes cast whilst the NPP parliamentary candidate Alexander Kodwo Kom Abban had 25,235 votes making 44.9% of the total votes cast, the GUM parliamentary candidate Edmond Panyin Enchill had 716 votes making 1.3% of the total votes cast, and the PPP parliamentary candidate Charles Yawson had 481 votes making 0.9% of the total votes cast.

=== Committees ===
Gyan is a member of the Members Holding Offices of Profit Committee and also a member of the Environment, Science and Technology Committee.

== Personal life ==
Gyan is a Christian.

== Philanthropy ==
In April 2021, he gave drivers in his constituency over 200 fuel coupons containing 10 gallons of fuel. He also supported the Apam Senior High School and Gomoa Senior High School with building materials.

In November 2021, he presented about 3,500 mathematical sets to final year students writing the BECE in his constituency.
