= Eguadoto Festival =

Festival in Ghana by the Fantes in Central region

Eguadoto Festival is an annual festival celebrated by the chiefs and people of Fantes in the Central Region of Ghana. It is usually celebrated in the month of August. It is also celebrated by the people of Gomoa Ajumako near Apam. It is also celebrated by the people of Gomoa Pomadze.

== Celebrations ==
During the festival, visitors are welcomed to share food and drinks. The people put on traditional clothes and there is durbar of chiefs. There is also dancing and drumming.

== Significance ==
The festival is celebrated for the purification of the ancestral stools and marks the onset of fresh yams and the end of the famine period.
