= Alexander Abban =

Ghanaian politician

Hon. Alexander Kodwo Kom Abban MP

Member of the Ghana Parliament for Gomoa West constituency
- In office 7 January 2017 – 6 January 2021
- Preceded by: Hon. Francis Kojo Arthur
- Succeeded by: Richard Gyan Mensah
- President: Nana Akuffo-Addo

Personal details
- Born: 6 December 1973 (age 52) Gomoa Dawurampong, Ghana
- Party: New Patriotic Party
- Spouse: Anastasia Antoinette Abban
- Children: 4
- Education: Boston University School of Law, Kwame Nkrumah University of Science and Technology, Hamburg School of Applied Science, Goethe Institut
- Occupation: Politician
- Profession: Legal Advisor, Lecturer, Medical Officer
- Committees: Government Assurance Committee; Health Committee

Alexander Kodwo Kom Abban (born 6 December 1973) is a Ghanaian politician and a member of the Seventh Parliament of the Fourth Republic of Ghana representing the Gomoa West Constituency in the Central Region on the ticket of the New Patriotic Party.

== Early life and education ==
Abban was born on 6 December 1973 and hails from Gomoa Dawurampong in the Central Region of Ghana. He had his Master of Law degree in Banking and Financial law from the Boston University School of Law in 2008. He had his Medical License from the Medical and Dental Council. He also had his Bachelor of Science degree in Human Biology from the Kwame Nkrumah University of Science and Technology, Bachelor of Science degree in Medicine and Surgery from the same institution. He further had his master's degree in public health from the Hamburg School of Applied Science. He also had a certificate in German from the Goethe Institut in Accra.

== Career ==
Abban was a Legal Advisor from 2013 to 2014 at Ghana Stock Exchange. He was also a lecturer at the Ghana Institute of Management and Public Administration from 2009 to 2010. He was also a Part-time lecturer at the Ghana School of Law from 2010 to 2015. He was a House Officer from 2009 to 2012 at Ghana Health Service and a Medical Officer at the same institution from 2012 to 2016.

== Politics ==
Abban is a member of the New Patriotic Party. He was the former Member of Parliament in Seventh Parliament of the Fourth Republic of Ghana for Gomoa West Constituency in the Central Region of Ghana.

=== 2016 election ===
During the 2016 Ghanaian general election, Abban won the Gomoa West Constituency parliamentary seat. He won with 22,741 votes making 49.6% of the total votes cast whilst the NDC parliamentary candidate Samuel Fletcher had 21,004 votes making 45.8% of the total votes cast, the PPP parliamentary candidate Charles Yawson had 2,086 votes making 4.6% of the total votes cast and the CPP parliamentary candidate Stephen Afriyie had 0 vote making 0.0% of the total votes cast.

=== Committees ===
Abban was a member of the Government Assurance Committee and also a member of the Health Committee.

=== Minister ===
He is the former Deputy Minister for Health. He is also a former Deputy Minister for Communications.

=== 2020 election ===
Abban lost the Gomoa West Constituency parliamentary seat during the 2020 Ghanaian general elections to the NDC parliamentary candidate Richard Gyan Mensah. He lost with 25,235 votes making 44.9% of the total votes cast whilst Richard had 29,822 votes making 53.0% of the total votes cast, the GUM parliamentary candidate Edmond Panyin Enchill had 716 votes making 1.3% of the total votes cast, and the PPP parliamentary candidate Charles Yawson had 481 votes making 0.9% of the total votes cast.

== Personal life ==
A Catholic, he and his wife, Anastasia Antoinette Abban, have four children.
