= Ama Benyiwa-Doe =

Ghanaian politician (1950–2021)

Regional Minister for Central Region
- In office 2009–2012
- Parliamentary group: National Democratic Congress
- President: John Evans Atta Mills

Member of Parliament for Gomoa West
- In office 1992

Personal details
- Born: 1950
- Died: 19 September 2021 (aged 71) Tema, Ghana

Ama Benyiwa-Doe aka Ama Chavez (born 1950 – 19 September 2021) was a Ghanaian politician who served as Regional Minister for Central Region.

== Early life ==
Benyiwa-Doe was born in Gomoa West in the Central Region of Ghana.

She was a member of parliament for the Third Parliament of the Fourth Republic of Ghana on the ticket of the National Democratic Congress (NDC) for Gomoa West constituency, thus stood for the seat from 1992 until 2004.

== Career and politics ==
Ama was first elected into parliament during the December 1992 Ghanaian General Elections on the ticket of the National Democratic Congress as a member of the Gomoa West Constituency in the Central Region.

During the 1996 elections, she polled 17,504 votes out of the 33,955 valid votes cast representing 35.60% against Joyce Aidoo an NPP member who polled 10,866 votes, Samuel Attah-Eyison who polled 4,827 votes and Oduro Baffoe, an NCP member, who polled 758 votes.

She won in 2000 with 12,995 votes out of the 28,089 valid votes cast representing 46.30% against Benjamin Kojo Acquah, an NPP member who polled 11,248 votes, Kofi Amissah Essandoh, a CPP member who polled 2,468 votes and Muhammed M. Kassim, an NRP member who also polled 1,378 votes.

Ama was nominated by President Mills in January 2009 as the Central Regional Minister in Ghana, she became a Regional Minister of State in January 2009 to 2012 for the Central Region of Ghana. She was also a former member of the council of State.

Ama occupied the seat as a member of parliament for the Gomoa West Constituency from 1992 until 2004 where she was defeated by Joe Kingsley Hackman of the New Patriotic Party in the 2004 Ghanaian general elections with a total votes cast of 23,663 representing 63.20% of the total votes over her (Ama), with her total votes cast as 12,165 representing 32.50% of the total votes.

Other opponents; Joseph Assan Sackey of the Convention Peoples Party who polled 863 votes representing 2.30% of the total votes cast, Muhammed Mutawakil Kassim of the National Reform Party who had 533 votes representing 2.30% of the total votes cast and John Thompson of the Great Consolidated Popular Party who also polled 216 votes representing 0.60% of the total votes cast. She continued to work for the National Democratic Congress as national women's organizer.

She was also a member of the Pan-African Parliament.

== Education ==
Ama attended L.A. Middle School where she obtained her GCE Ordinary Level certificate. She then proceeded to Accra Workers College where she obtained her GCE Advance Level certificate before advancing to M.I. Kaliun School where she obtained her Diploma degree.

== Death ==
She died on Sunday the 19th of September 2021 at Tema. She was 71.

== Legacy ==
According to John Mahama, Ama was a gender activist and a women's rights champion.
