= Twifo/Hemang/Lower Denkyira District =

Twifo/Heman/Lower Denkyira District
- Former District
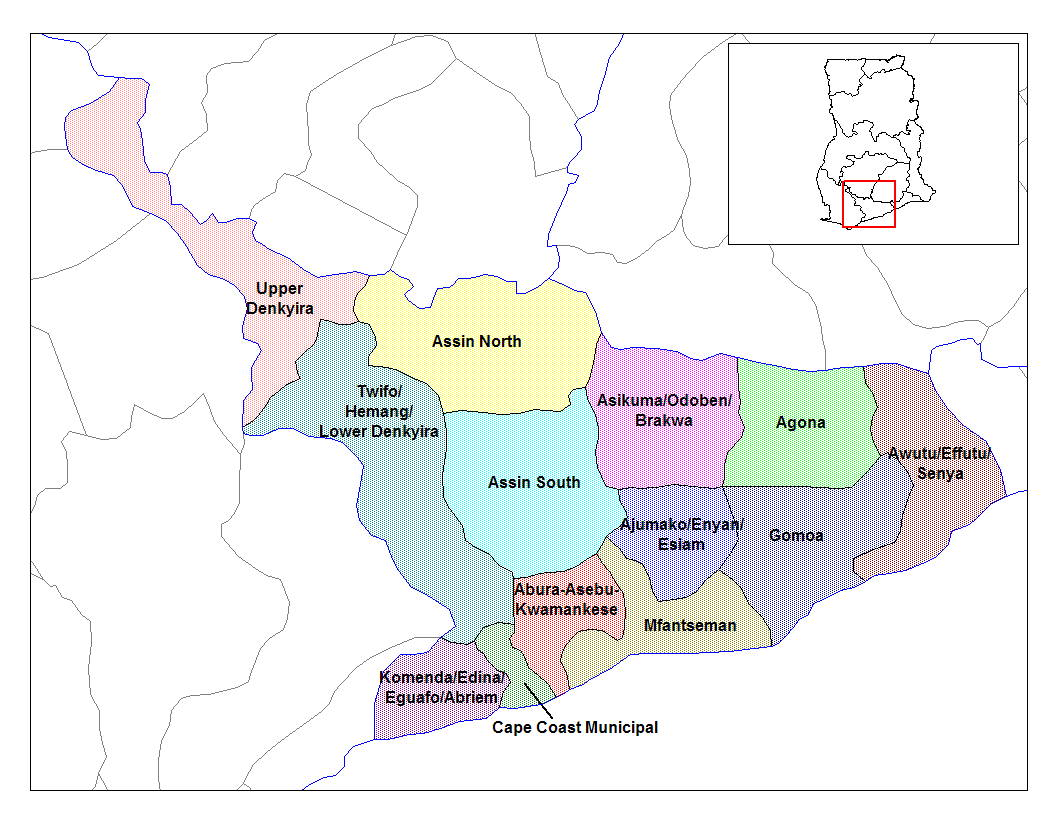
- Districts of Central Region

- Location of Twifo/Heman/Lower Denkyira District within Central
- Coordinates: 5°36′41.76″N 1°32′58.56″W
- Country: Ghana
- Region: Central
- Capital: Twifo Praso

Government
  - District Executive: Emmanuel Kwadwo Nanah

Population (2021)
  - Total: 66,075
- Time zone: UTC+0 (GMT)
- ISO 3166 code: GH-CP-__

Twifo/Heman/Lower Denkyira District is a former district that was located in Central Region, Ghana. Originally created as an ordinary district assembly in 1988, which was created from the former Denkyira District Council. However on 28 June 2012, it was split off into two new districts: Twifo-Atti Morkwa District (capital: Twifo Praso) and Hemang-Lower Denkyira District (capital: Twifo Hemang). The district assembly was located in the northwest part of Central Region and had Twifo Praso as its capital town.

== Places of interest ==
Twifo/Heman/Lower Denkyira District is where Kakum National Park is located. The district also has the River Pra and the Twifo Oil Palm Plantation Limited Company.

== List of settlements ==
Settlements of Twifo/Heman/Lower Denkyira District
No.	Settlement	Population	Population year
1	Ampenkro		
2	Ankaako		
3	Ayiase		
4	Burukuso		
5	Jukwa		
6	Kyiaboso (Chiaboso)		
7	Mfuom		
8	Ntafrewaso		
9	Nuamakrom Mampona		
10	Nyenase		
11	Odumase		
12	Twifo Aduabeng		
13	Twifo Agona Denkyira		
14	Twifo Hemang		
15	Twifo-Mampong		
16	Twifo Praso		
17	Twifu Wamaso		
18	Wawase		

== Sources ==
- "Twifo/Heman/Lower Denkyira District". Statoids.
