= Nyanyano =

Community in Central Region, Ghana

- Location in Ghana
- Country: Ghana
- Region: Central Region
- District: Gomoa East District

Nyanyano is a community in the Gomoa East District in the Central Region of Ghana. It is located about 20 km south-west of Accra and about 6 km south of Kasoa.

== Institutions ==
- Nyanyano Police Station
- Mother and Child School
