= J.E. Afful =

Ghanaian politician

Member of parliament for Abura-Asebu-Kwamankese
- In office 7 January 1997 – 6 January 2001
- President: John Jerry Rawlings

Personal details
- Born: Abura/Asebu/Kwamankese, Central Region Ghana
- Party: National Democratic Congress
- Occupation: Politician

John Edward Afful is a Ghanaian politician and a member of the Second Parliament Parliament of the Fourth Republic representing the Abura-Asebu-Kwamankese Constituency in the Central Region of Ghana.

== Early life ==
Afful was born in Abura/Asebu/Kwamankese in the Central Region of Ghana.

== Politics ==
Afful was elected into Parliament on the ticket of the National Democratic Congress as a member of Parliament for the Abura-Asebu-Kwamankese in the Central Region of Ghana. He polled 20,262 votes out of the 33,585 valid votes cast representing 44.10% over his opponents Andrew Kingsford Mensah of the New Patriotic Party who polled 13,088 votes representing 28.50% and Emmanuel F. Appiah-Kibi of the Convention People's Party who also polled 235 votes representing 0.50%. While in parliament, he was appointed Minister of Environment, Science and Technology.
