= Gomoa West (Ghana parliament constituency) =

Constituency in the Central Region of Ghana

- constituency for the Parliament of Ghana
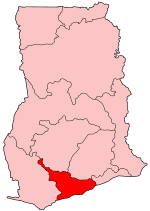
- District: Gomoa West District
- Region: Central Region of Ghana

Current constituency
- Party: National Democratic Congress (NDC).
- MP: Richard Gyan Mensah

Gomoa West is one of the constituencies represented in the Parliament of Ghana. Its boundaries are similar to those of the Gomoa West District in the Central Region of Ghana. The current constituency boundaries have been in place from prior to the 2012 Ghanaian general election. This followed the creation of 45 new constituencies to take the total number of constituencies from 230 to 275.

Francis Kojo Arthur was the member of parliament for the constituency for two terms between January 2009 to January 2017. He was elected on the ticket of the National Democratic Congress (NDC) and won a majority of 3,474 votes to become the MP. He succeeded Joe Kingsley Hackman who had represented the constituency in the 4th Republic parliament on the ticket of the New Patriotic Party (NPP).

== Members of Parliament ==
| First elected | Member | Party |
Western Gomoa
| 1954 | Kojo Botsio | Convention People's Party |
Gomoa-Ajumako
| 1965 | Kojo Botsio | Convention People's Party |
Gomoa-Assin-Ajumako in 2nd Republic
| 1969 | Frank Abor Essel-Cobbah | Progress Party |
3rd Republic
| 1979 | G. K. Benjah (Gomoa Assin constituency) | Action Congress Party |
Gomoa West in 4th Republic
| 1992 | Ama Benyiwa-Doe | National Democratic Congress |
| 2004 | Joe Kingsley Hackman | New Patriotic Party |
| 2008 | Francis Kojo Arthur | National Democratic Congress |
New boundaries drawn in 2012
| 2016 | Alexander Kodwo Kom Abban | New Patriotic Party |
| 2020 | Richard Gyan Mensah | National Democratic Congress |

== Elections ==
2020 Ghanaian general election: Gomoa West
| Party | Candidate | Votes | % | ±% |
|---|---|---|---|---|
| National Democratic Congress | Richard Gyan Mensah | 29,822 | 53.0 | — |
| New Patriotic Party | Alexander Kodwo Kom Abban | 25,235 | 44.9 | — |
| Ghana Union Movement | Edmond Panyin Enchill | 716 | 1.3 | — |
| Progressive People's Party | Charles Yawson | 481 | 0.9 | — |
| Majority | | 4,587 | 8.1 | — |
| Turnout | | 56,254 | | |
| Registered electors | | 74,783 | | |

== See also ==
- List of Ghana Parliament constituencies
