= Bewadze =

Community in Central Region, Ghana

- Town
- Country: Ghana
- Region: Central Region
- District: Gomoa West District

Population
  - Total: —
- Time zone: GMT
  - Summer (DST): GMT

Bewadze is a community on the Kasoa-Cape Coast highway in the Gomoa West District in the Central Region of Ghana. Vegetables are produced in the community.

== Facilities ==
- Bewadze Fuel Service Station
- Casa De Ropa. a food processing factory
