= Francis Kojo Arthur =

Ghanaian politician

Member of the Ghana Parliament for Gomoa West Constituency
- In office 2008–2016

Personal details
- Born: 22 November 1954 (age 71)
- Party: National Democratic Congress
- Education: Kwame Nkrumah University of Science and Technology

Francis Kojo Arthur (born 22 November 1954) is a former member of the Sixth Parliament of the Fourth Republic of Ghana, representing the Gomoa West Constituency in Central region of Ghana.

== Personal life ==
Arthur is married with ten children. He is a Christian (Catholic).

== Early life and education ==
Arthur was born on 22 November 1954 in Gomoa Abasa Number 2 in the Central region of Ghana.

He attended the Kwame Nkrumah University of Science and Technology where he obtained a master's degree in Animal Breeding in 2000.

== Career ==
Prior to becoming a member of parliament, Arthur was a tutor at Anglican Senior High School in Kumasi.

== Politics ==
Arthur is a member of National Democratic Congress. In 2009, he succeeded Joe Kingsley Hackman as the member of parliament for Gomoa West after contesting and winning the seat in the 2008 Ghanaian elections. During the elections he garnered 15,985 votes which represented 47.47% of the total valid votes cast and hence defeated the other contestants. He contested again in the 2012 Ghanaian Elections and won giving him the chance to represent his constituency for the second term. In the 2012 elections, he garnered 27,624 votes which represented 56.67% of the total valid votes cast.

However, in 2016, he could not contest in the 2016 Ghanaian elections because he lost the National Democratic Congress (NDC) parliamentary elections. Hence the winner, Samuel Fletcher, represented the NDC in the 2016 Ghanaian elections.
