= Okyereko =

Town in Central Region, Ghana

- Location in Ghana
- Coordinates: 5°24′51″N 0°36′18″W
- Country: Ghana
- Region: Central Region
- District: Gomoa East District

Okyereko is a town near Winneba Junction in the Gomoa East District in the Central Region of Ghana. It is located along the Kasoa-Winneba road on the Cape Coast-Accra Highway.
