= Francis Kingsley Ato Codjoe =

Ghanaian politician (born 1971)

Hon. Francis Kingsley Ato Codjoe MP

Member of the Ghana Parliament for Ekumfi Constituency
- In office 7 January 2017 – 6 January 2021
- Succeeded by: Abeiku Crentsil

Deputy Minister for Fisheries and Aquaculture Development
- In office 11 April 2017 – 7 January 2021
- President: Nana Akuffo-Addo

Personal details
- Born: 31 July 1971 (age 55) Ekumfi Essarkyir, Ghana
- Party: New Patriotic Party
- Education: University of Ghana
- Occupation: Politician
- Profession: Country Controller

Francis Kingsley Ato Codjoe (born 31 July 1971) was a Ghanaian politician and member of the Seventh Parliament of the Fourth Republic of Ghana representing the Ekumfi Constituency in the Central Region on the ticket of the New Patriotic Party. He is a former Deputy Minister for Fisheries and Aquaculture Development.

== Early life and education ==
Codjoe was born on 31 July 1971 and hails from Ekumfi Essarkyir in the Central Region of Ghana. He graduated with a bachelor's degree in finance from the University of Ghana.

== Career ==
Codjoe was the country controller of NCR (Ghana) Limited in Accra.

== Politics ==
Codjoe is a member of the New Patriotic Party.

=== 2016 election ===
In the 2016 Ghanaian general election, he won the Ekumfi Constituency parliamentary seat with 12,240 votes making 50.1% of the total votes cast whilst the NDC parliamentary candidate Abeiku Crentsil had 11,632 votes making 47.6% of the total votes cast, the PPP parliamentary candidate Stephen Quansah had 505 votes making 2.1% of the total votes cast and the CPP parliamentary candidate Kweku Essuoun had 70 votes making 0.3% of the total votes cast.

=== Minister ===
Codjoe was the Deputy Minister for Fisheries & Aquaculture from 11 April 2017 to 7 January 2021.

=== 2020 election ===
In the 2020 Ghanaian general election, he lost the Ekumfi Constituency parliamentary seat to the NDC parliamentary candidate Abeiku Crentsil. He lost with 13,468 votes making 45.0% of the total votes cast whilst Abeiku had 16,037 votes making 53.6% of the total votes cast, the GUM parliamentary candidate Regina Amoah had 371 votes making 1.2% of the total votes cast and the CPP parliamentary candidate Ibrahim Anderson had 0 vote making 0.0% of the total votes cast.

== Personal life ==
Codjoe is a Christian.
