= Isaac Owusu-Mensah =

Ghanaian political scientist and academic administrator

Prof. Isaac Owusu-Mensah
- Born: March 1, 1971 (age 55)
- Citizenship: Ghanaian
- Occupations: Academic; political scientist

Academic background
- Education: University of Ghana (BA, MSc, PhD)

Academic work
- Discipline: Political science
- Institutions: University of Ghana

Head, Department of Political Science, University of Ghana
- Incumbent
- Assumed office 1 July 2025
- Preceded by: Seidu Alidu

Director of Research, Office of the President (Ghana)
- In office January 2021 – January 2025
- Preceded by: Victor Newman
- Succeeded by: Position abolished

Isaac Owusu-Mensah (born March 1, 1971) is a Ghanaian political scientist and academic who serves as Head of the Department of Political Science at the University of Ghana since July 2025. He previously served as director of research at the Office of the President of Ghana from 2021 to 2025. He is known for his scholarship on democracy, electoral politics, and governance in Ghana, as well as his contributions to public policy and institutional research.

== Early life and education ==
Isaac Owusu Mensah was born on March 1, 1971. He received his secondary education at the Business Secondary School in Tamale and Apam Senior High School in Apam. Owusu-Mensah studied at the University of Ghana, where he obtained a Bachelor of Arts degree in political science with philosophy in 1997. He later earned a Master of Philosophy degree in political science in 2003 and a Doctor of Philosophy (PhD) in political science in 2009 from the same institution.

== Academic career ==
Owusu-Mensah began his academic career at the University of Ghana in 2011 as a lecturer in the Department of Political Science. He was promoted to Senior Lecturer in 2016 and later to associate professor, specialising in democracy and electoral studies. In July 2025, he was appointed Head of the Department of Political Science at the University of Ghana.

Throughout his academic career, he has contributed to university governance through service on a number of boards and committees, including the Academic Board, the Admissions Board, and the College of Humanities Academic Board.

He has also been cited in media and policy discussions on elections and governance in Ghana.

At the University of Ghana, Owusu-Mensah has taught a broad range of undergraduate and postgraduate courses in political science and development studies. His teaching areas include political theory, research methods, public policy analysis, and the politics of identity.

He has supervised and examined numerous postgraduate theses and has contributed to academic assessment and curriculum development across institutions. His work as an external examiner and assessor includes engagements with the Ghana Institute of Management and Public Administration and the Ghana Armed Forces Command and Staff College.

== Government and policy roles ==
In January 2021, Owusu-Mensah was appointed Director of Research at the Office of the President of Ghana, a position he held until 2025. In this capacity, he coordinated research activities, supported policy formulation, and contributed to the monitoring and evaluation of government programmes.

Beyond his government role, he has been actively engaged in policy and governance work with both local and international organisations. His professional experience includes long-term involvement with the Konrad Adenauer Stiftung, as well as collaborations with the African Peer Review Mechanism and the Commonwealth Human Rights Initiative. He has also undertaken consultancy work for institutions such as the Danish Institute for Parties and Democracy.

== Research and publications ==
Owusu-Mensah's research focuses on democratic governance, electoral politics, political institutions, and development in Ghana. His scholarly work examines issues such as political party development, decentralisation, electoral violence, and inequality in public policy.

He has authored and co-authored more than thirty publications, including peer-reviewed journal articles, book chapters, and policy reports. His work has appeared in journals such as African Studies, Africa Today, Politikon, Politics & Policy, and the Journal of African Elections. His publications include studies on political party systems, judicial roles in democratic governance, and the dynamics of inequality in public service delivery.

In addition to academic publications, he has contributed to technical reports and policy-oriented research addressing governance, skills development, and institutional reform in Ghana.

== Fellowships and professional activities ==
Owusu-Mensah has held several international fellowships, including a DAAD Fellowship and a visiting scholarship at Humboldt University in Berlin, as well as a United Nations University fellowship in Japan. He has participated in international conferences and academic forums, presenting research on governance, political parties, and democratic development.

He is also affiliated with a number of professional and research organisations, including the International Political Science Association, the American Political Science Association, Brussels Institute of Advanced Studies, and the Varieties of Democracy (V-Dem) Institute.
