= Anthony Christian Dadzie =

Ghanaian politician (born 1962)

Member of the Ghana Parliament for Abura Asebu Kwamankese

Personal details
- Born: 9 July 1962 (age 64)
- Party: National Democratic Congress

Anthony Christian Dadzie (9 July 1962) was the Member of Parliament for Abura Asebu Kwamankese in the Central region of Ghana from 2009 to 2016.

== Early life and education ==
Dadzie was born on 9 July 1962 in Amosima in the Central region. He attended University of Cape Coast where he obtained a diploma in Business Studies in 2006. He further went to GIMPA where he had EMPA in 2011.

== Career ==
Dadzie is a member of National Democratic Congress. He became a member of Parliament in 2009. He was a member of the Health and Judiciary committees, Transport Committee and Communications Committee of Parliament of Ghana. He is also served as a board member for National Board for Small Scale Industries (NBSSI) He is an accountant and Financial Officer. He was the Principal Accounting Assistant for Cape Coast Quarry.

== Politics ==
Dadzie first became a member of the Parliament of Ghana in 2009. However, in 2016, he contested in the National Democratic Congress(NDC) parliamentary elections and lost to Samuel Kweku Hayford who then represented the NDC in the 2016 general Elections but also lost to New Patriotic Party's Elvis Morris Donkoh.

== Personal life ==
Dadzie is a Christian (Catholic) and he is married with four children.
