= Joe Kingsley Hackman =

Ghanaian politician (born 1955)

Hon. Joe Kingsley Hackman

Member of Ghana Parliament for Gomoa West constituency
- In office 7 January 2005 – 6 January 2009
- President: John Agyekum Kufour

Personal details
- Born: 12 December 1955 (age 70) Gomoa West, Central Region Gold Coast (now Ghana)
- Party: New Patriotic Party
- Education: University College of Estate Management, UK
- Occupation: Politician
- Profession: University Lecturer

Joe Kinsley Hackman (born 12 December 1955) is a Ghanaian politician and a member of the Fourth Parliament of the Fourth Republic of Ghana representing the Gomoa West Constituency in the Central Region.

== Early life and education ==
Hackman was born in Gomoa West in the Central Region of Ghana on 12 December 1955. He had his Basic Education here in Ghana and worked for about five years before leaving to Nigeria in 1979 where he left to Holland in 1981. He enrolled in the College of Estate Management and Neason College of Technology in the United Kingdom, UK and completed his Professional studies in Building Technology and Management. He qualified as a Chartered Builder and later read a Master of Science Degree in Construction Management at the South Bank University in London.

== Career ==
He was the member parliament for the Gomoa West Constituency from 2005 to 2009. He worked in Holland, France and the USA. He came back to Ghana in 1994 and then became a university lecturer at the Kwame Nkrumah University of Science and Technology, KNUST. He teaches Construction Technology and Management. Occasionally, he does a little bit of Domestic House Design and Construction Project Management Consulting, and Project cost.

== Politics ==
Hackman was first elected into Parliament during the December 2004 Ghanaian General elections on the ticket of the New Patriotic Party representing the Gomoa West Constituency in the Central Region of Ghana with 23,663 votes out of the 37,440 valid votes cast representing 63.20%. He was defeated by the National Democratic Congress candidate Francis Kojo Arthur in the 2008 General Elections.

== Personal life ==
Hackman is a Christian.
