= Esakyir =

Coordinates: 5.3183°N 0.8914°W

Esarkyir Ghana
- Town
- Interactive map of Esarkyir Ghana
- Country: Ghana
- Region: Central Region

Esarkyir (also spelled 'Esakyir', 'Essakyir' or 'Essarkyir') is a town in the Central region of Ghana, and 98 km away from the capital on Accra Cape Coast road.

In June 2012, the new Ekumfi District was inaugurated, with Essarkyir as its capital.

The town is also known for the Esarkyir T.I. Ahmadiya Secondary School. The school is a second cycle institution.

This small town made the headlines in the national newspapers and media after a sad incident in 2014 in which 4 people died in an accident .
