= Ekumfi District =

- District
- Districts of Central Region

- Location of Ekumfi District within Central
- Coordinates: 5°19′5.88″N 0°53′29.04″W
- Country: Ghana
- Region: Central
- Capital: Essakyir

Government
  - Member of Parliament: Kwainoe Ekow Othniel

Area
  - Total: 276.65 km^{2} (106.82 sq mi)

Population (2021)
  - Total: 56,741
- Time zone: UTC+0 (GMT)
- ISO 3166 code: GH-CP-EK

Ekumfi District is one of the twenty-two districts in Central Region, Ghana. It was formerly part of a then-larger Mfantsiman Municipality, which was also formed from the former Mfantsiman District Council. Ekumfi District was created when the eastern part of the Mfantsiman Municipality was split off on 28 June 2012; thus the remaining part has been retained as the Mfantsiman Municipal District. The district is located in the south-central part of Central Region and has Essarkyir as its capital town.

== Geography ==
The district is bordered to the north by Ajumako/Enyan/Essiam District, to the east by Gomoa West District, to the south by the Gulf of Guinea, and to the west by Mfantsiman Municipal District.

== Demographics ==
The total area of the district is 276.65 square kilometers. According to the 2021 census, the population of the district was 56,741.
