= David T. D. Vondee =

Ghanaian politician

Hon. David T. D. Vondee
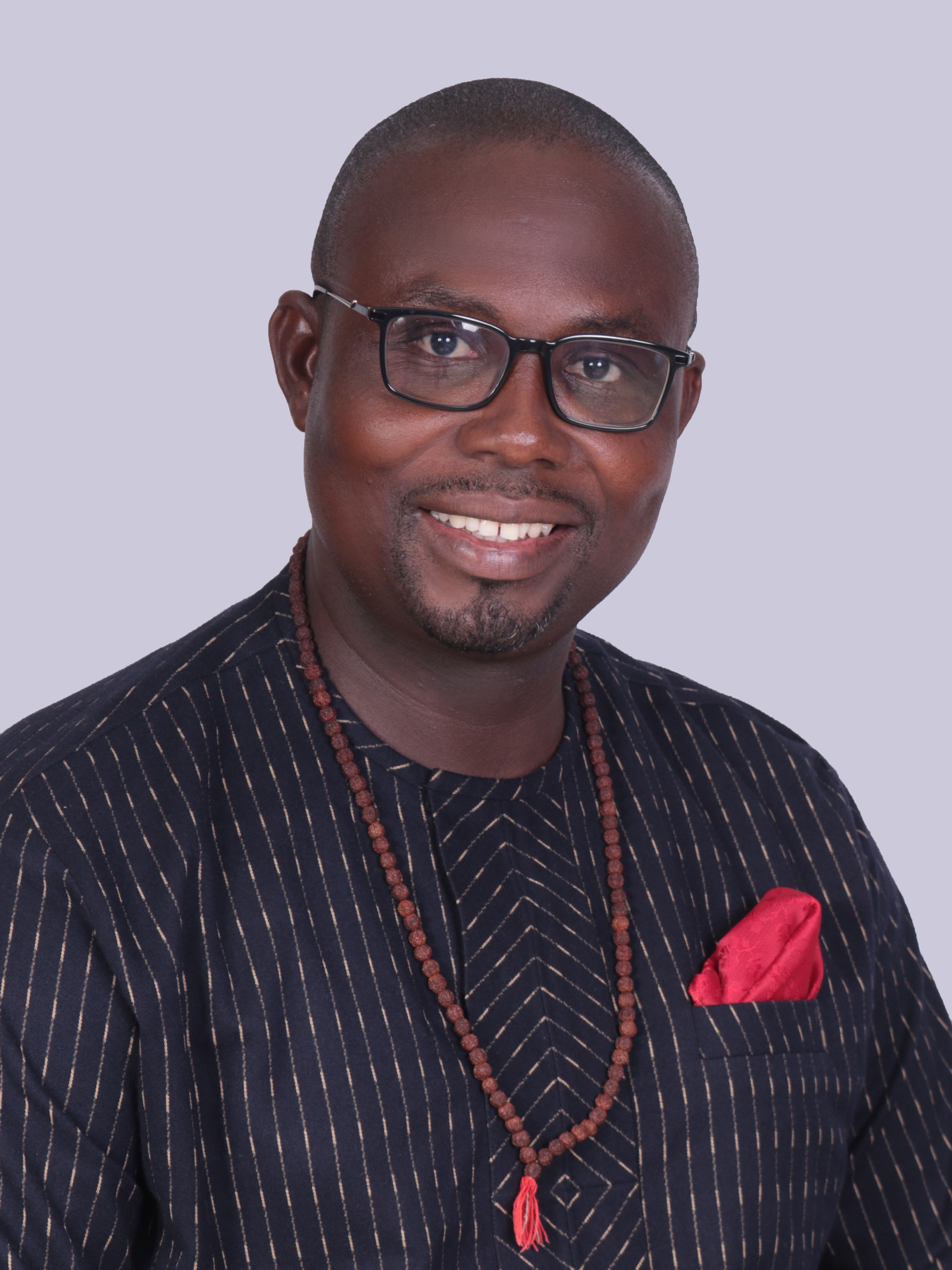

Member of Parliament for Twifo-Atii Morkwaa
- Incumbent
- Assumed office 7 January 2021
- President: Nana Akuffo Addo
- Preceded by: Abraham Dwuma Odoom

Personal details
- Born: 2 August 1978 (age 47) Mafi Adidome, Ghana
- Party: National Democratic Congress
- Occupation: Politician
- Committees: Works and Housing Committee

David T. D. Vondee (born 2 August 1978) is a Ghanaian politician who currently serves as the Member of Parliament for the Twifo-Atii Morkwaa Constituency in the Central Region of Ghana.

== Early life and education ==
David Vondee was born on 2 August 1978 and hails from Mafi Adidome in the Volta Region of Ghana. David Vondee had his Associate Degree in Marketing, Business administration, and Communication in 2020. Vondee is an Ewe.

== Career ==
David Vondee is working as the Member of Parliament (MP) for Twifo-Atii Morkwaa Constituency in the Central Region of Ghana on the ticket of the National Democratic Congress.

== Political life ==
David Vondee contested and won the NDC parliamentary primaries for Twifo-Atii Morkwaa Constituency in the Central Region of Ghana.

=== 2020 elections ===
David Vondee won again in the 2020 Ghanaian general elections on the ticket of the National Democratic Congress with 21,416 votes making 51.5% of the total votes cast to join the Eighth (8th) Parliament of the Fourth Republic of Ghana against Ebenezer Obeng Dwamena of the New Patriotic Party who had 19,594 votes (47.2%) Samuel Kofi Essel of GUM who also had 541 votes (1.3%).

=== Committees ===
David Vondee is a member of the Works and Housing Committee of the Eighth (8th) Parliament of the Fourth Republic of Ghana.

== Personal life ==
David T.D.Vondee is a christian.
