= Fort Patience =

Ghanaian fort

Fort Lijdzaamheid
- Part of Dutch Gold Coast
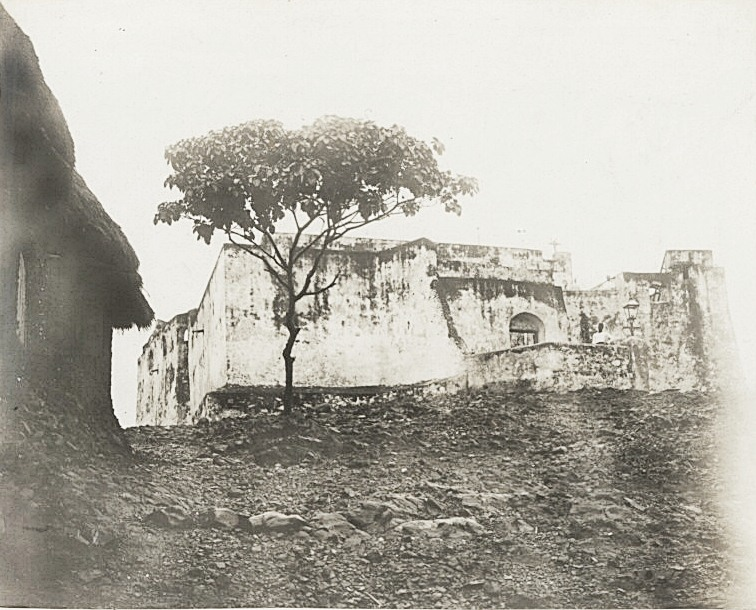
- Photograph of Fort Patience from the 1890s

Location
- Coordinates: 5°17′10″N 0°43′41″W

Site history
- Built: 1697

Garrison information
- Occupants: Netherlands (1697-1868)

UNESCO World Heritage Site
- Official name: Fort Patience (Fort Leydsaemheyt)
- Location: Apam, Central Region, Ghana
- Part of: Forts and Castles, Volta, Greater Accra, Central and Western Regions
- Criteria: Cultural: (vi)
- Reference: 34-003
- Inscription: 1979 (3rd Session)

Fort Patience (Dutch: Fort Lijdzaamheid, or, in 17th-century spelling, Fort Leydsaemheyt) is a Dutch-built fort located in the township of Apam, in the Central Region of Ghana. Originally built in 1697, it served as a defensive fortification and a trading post. Because of its testimony to European pre-colonial and colonial influence in West Africa, the fort was inscribed on the UNESCO World Heritage List along with several other forts and castles in Ghana.

== History ==
The fort was first built as a stone trading lodge in 1697 at the request of the King of Acron, with whom the Dutch had a treaty, and which was situated between the kingdoms of Fante and Agona, with whom the British had a treaty. The executives of the Dutch West India Company were quite wary to establish a fort in an area with minimal trade, and only consented on the condition that it would be built at minimal costs. The Acron were not happy with this, and frequently threatened the Dutch with expulsion if they would not extend the fortifications. As a result, it took the Dutch five years to complete the building, which is why they gave it the name Fort Patience.

By 1721 the lodge had been converted into a defensive fortification, which sat on a craggy peninsula just out from the township to the south, offering a commanding view of Apam's harbour to the north, and the Gulf Of Guinea coast to the south, east, and west.

Early in 1782, Captain Thomas Shirley in the 50-gun ship Leander and the sloop-of-war Alligator sailed to the Dutch Gold Coast. Britain was at war with The Netherlands and Shirley captured the small Dutch forts at Moree (Fort Nassau - 20 guns), Kormantin (Courmantyne or Fort Amsterdam - 32 guns), Apam (Fort Lijdzaamheid or Fort Patience - 22 guns), Senya Beraku (Fort Goede Hoop - 18 guns), and Accra (Fort Crêvecoeur - 32 guns).

== Physical Structure ==
The original structure of the fort was a small two-storey stone lodge. The fort was reinforced by the Dutch between 1701 and 1721 into a demi-bastion on the northwest and the southeast. It served as a police station and a post office. Two large service yards were built to the south of the main building and included kitchens and the "Orange Hall" for receptions or "palavers". Several Dutch forts had an "Orange Hall", these extensions were not defended and were built at a time when they had come to a common understanding with the surrounding people.

== Call for Rehabilitation ==
On April 9, 2008, The Apam Youth and Development Association made an appeal to the National Museums and Monuments Board, the Dutch Embassy in Ghana, Gomoa District Assembly and other stakeholders to take urgent steps to save Fort Patience from further deterioration.

== Gallery ==
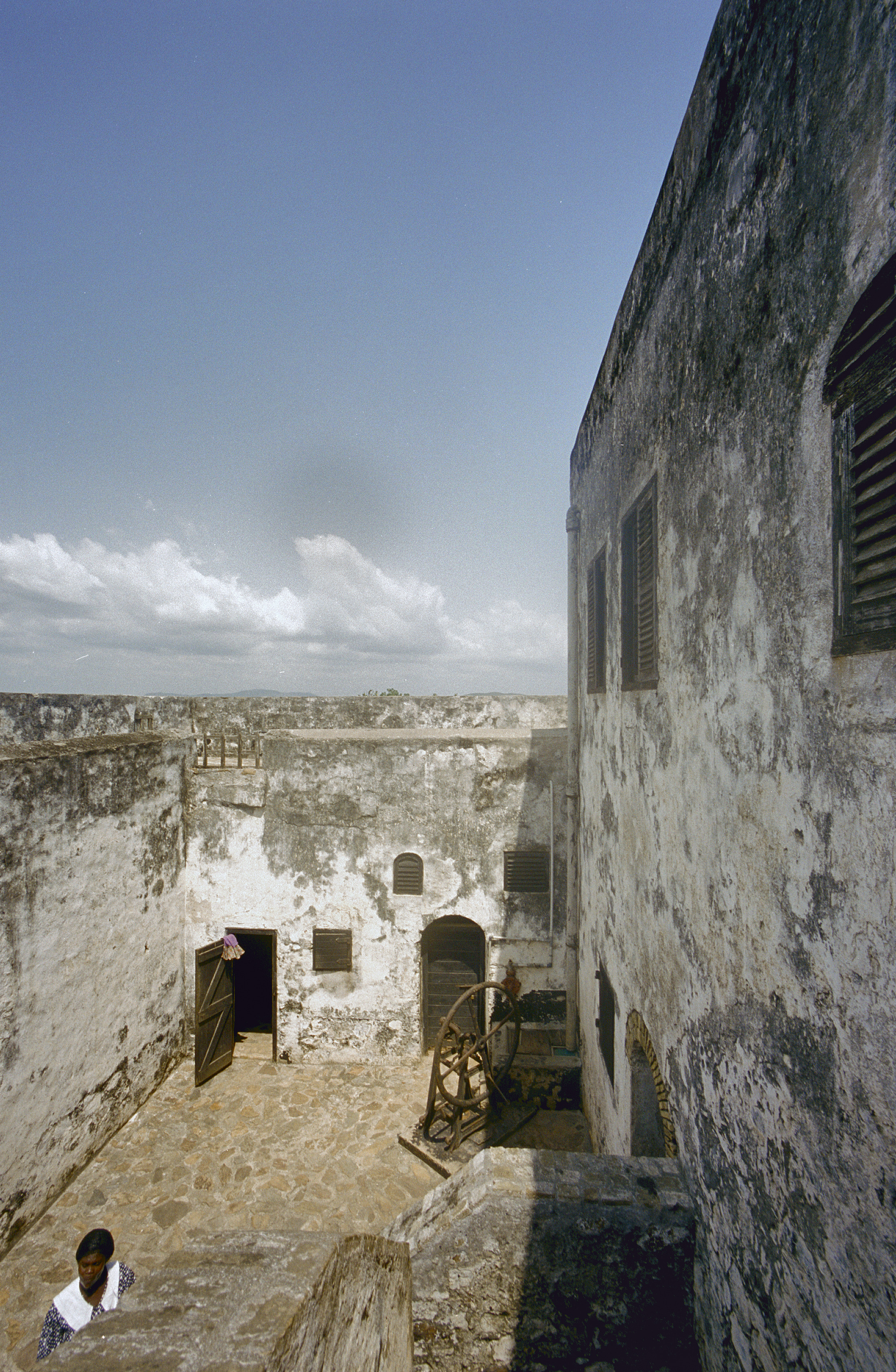

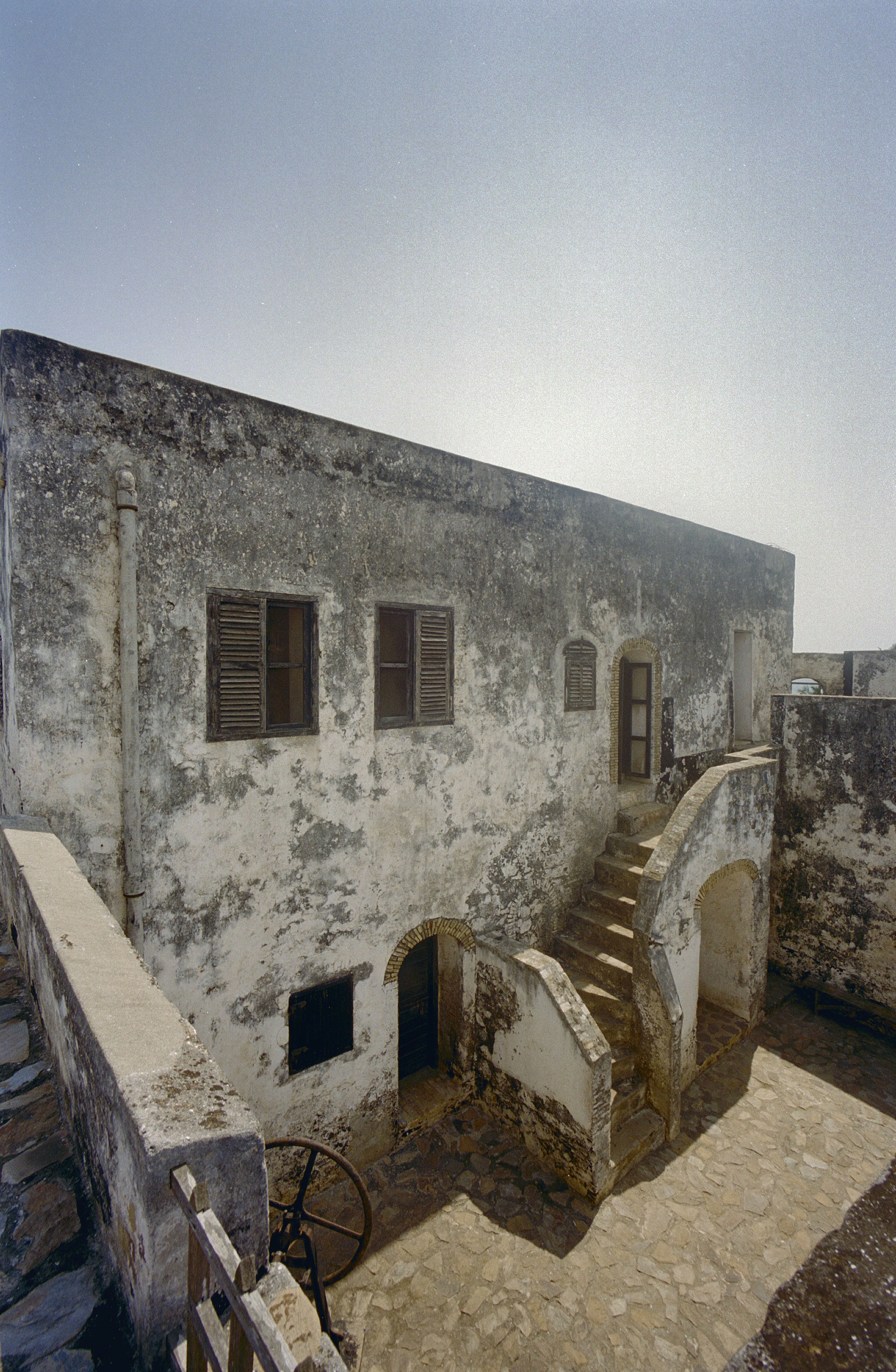

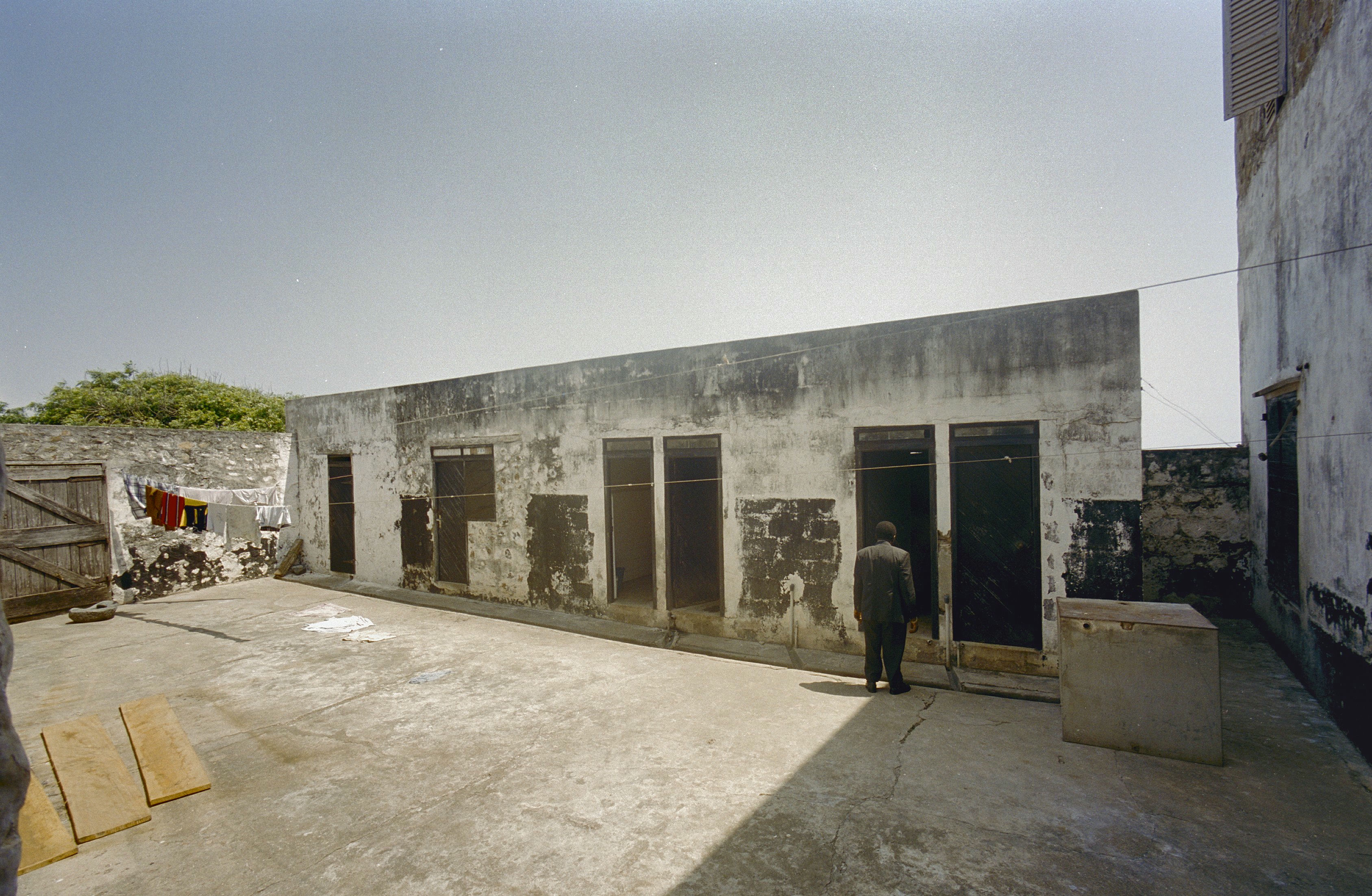

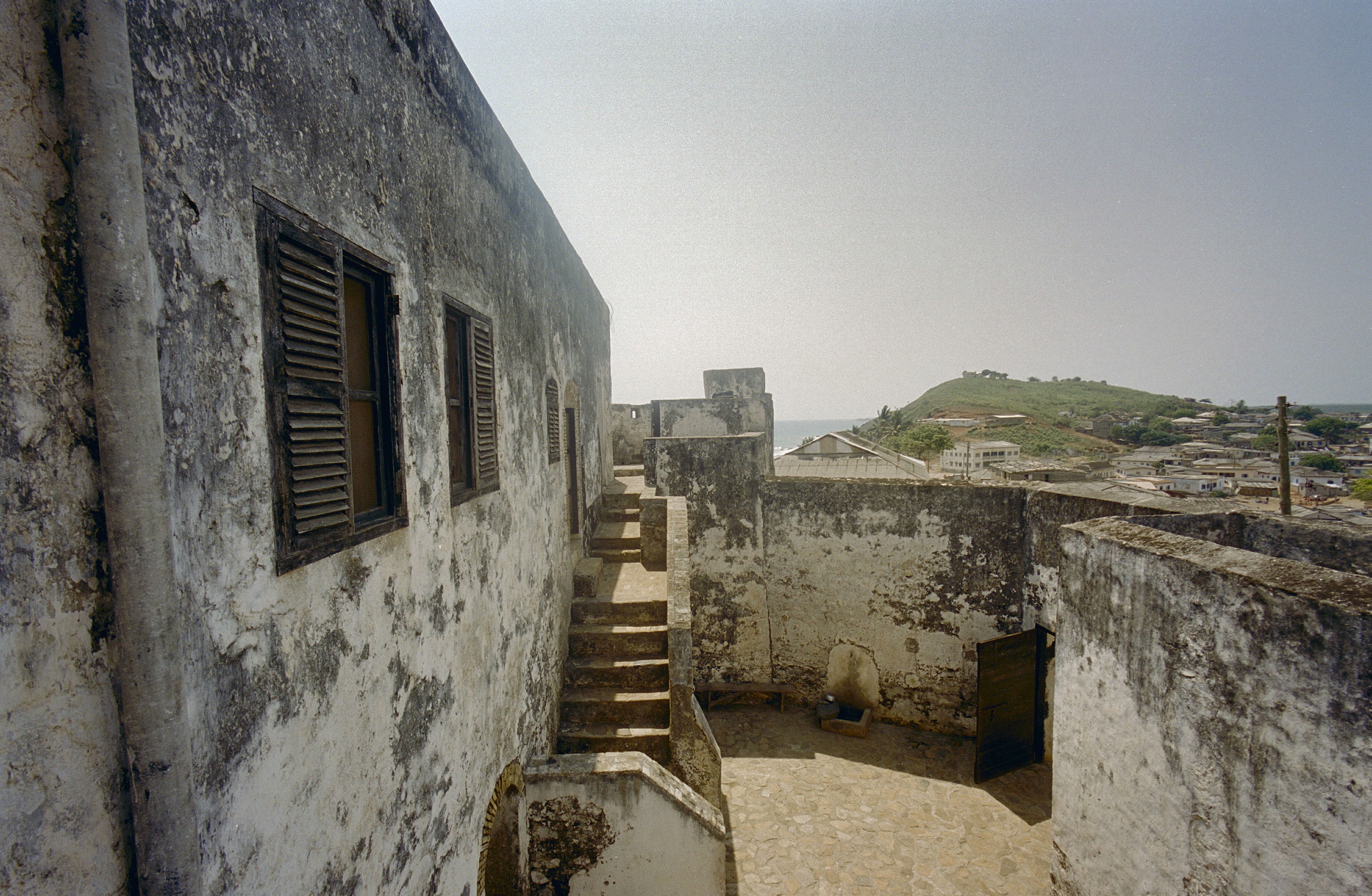

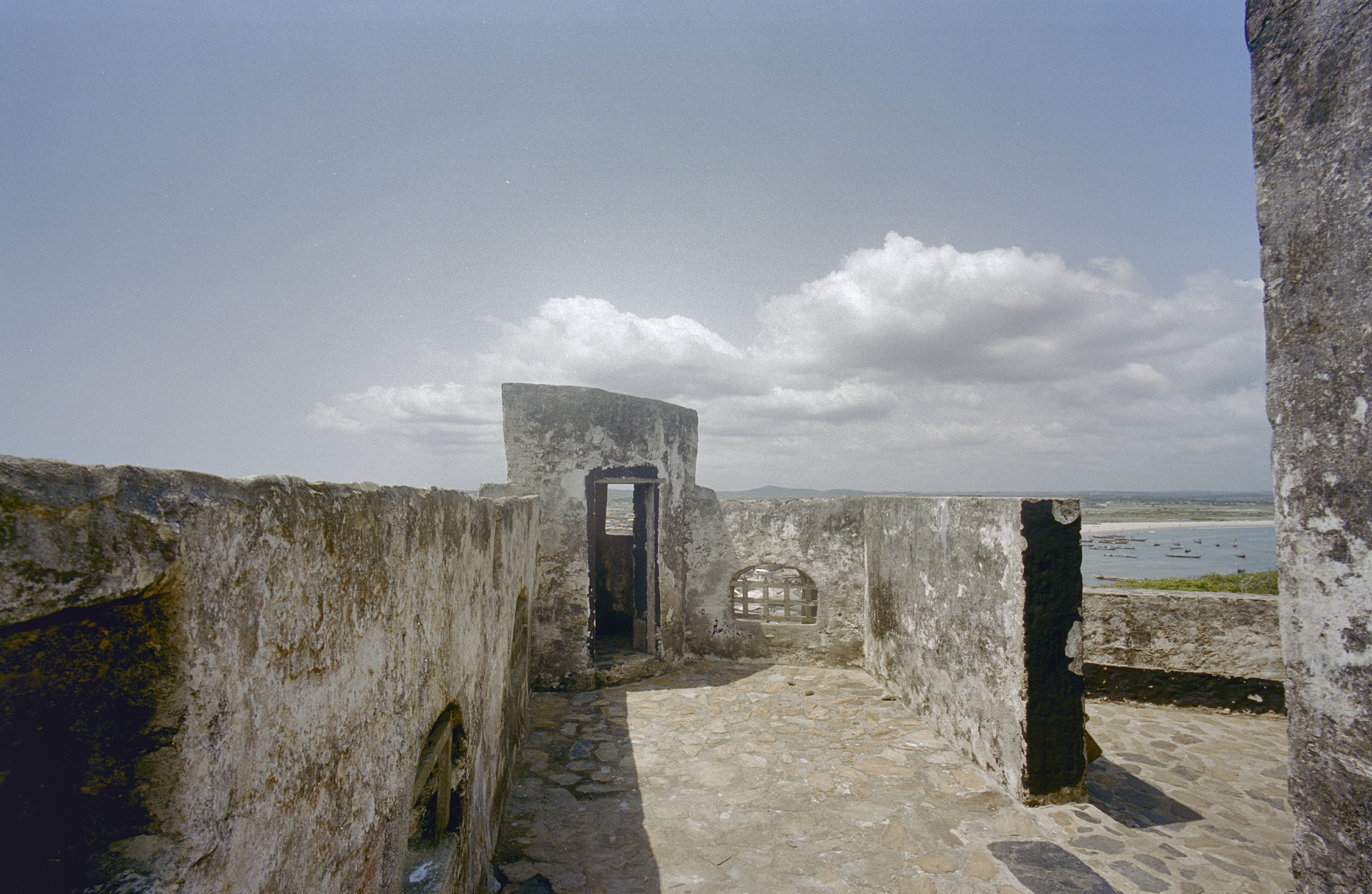

== Sources ==
- Van Dantzig, Albert (1999). Forts and Castles of Ghana. Accra: Sedco Publishing. ISBN 9964-72-010-6.
