= Abeiku Crentsil =

Ghanaian politician

Hon. Abeiku Crentsil
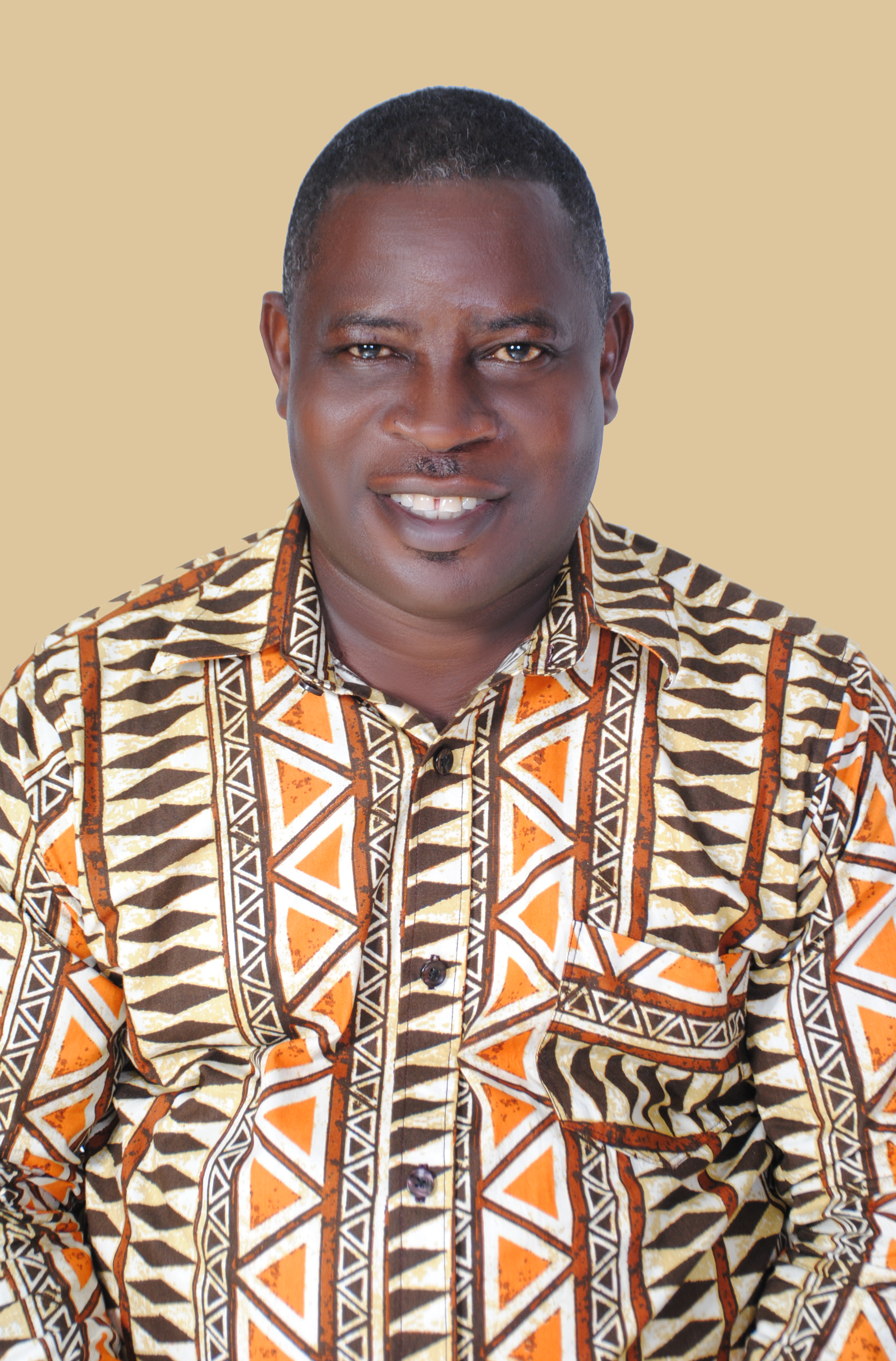

Member of Parliament for EkumfI Constituency
- Incumbent
- Assumed office 7 January 2021
- Preceded by: Francis Kingsley Ato Codjoe

Personal details
- Born: Abdulai Abanga; 28 March 1973 (age 53) Ekumfi, Ghana
- Party: National Democratic Congress
- Occupation: Politician
- Committees: Privileges Committee, Lands and Forestry Committee

Abeiku Crentsil is a Ghanaian politician and member of the Eighth Parliament of the Fourth Republic of Ghana representing the Ekumfi Constituency in the Central Region of Ghana on the ticket of the National Democratic Congress.

== Early life and education ==
Abeiku was born on 28 March 1973 and hails from Ekumfi Essuehyiam in the Central Region of Ghana. He attended National Engineering College in Takoradi where he obtained Construction Technician I in 1995.

== Politics ==
He is a member of National Democratic Congress. He was a committee member of Selection.

=== 2016 elections ===
In the 2016 Ghanaian general elections, he lost the Ekumfi Constituency parliamentary seat to the NPP parliamentary candidate Francis Kingsley Ato Codjoe. He lost with 11,632 votes making 47.6% of the total votes cast whilst Francis had 12,240 votes making 50.1% of the total votes cast, the PPP parliamentary candidate Stephen Quansah had 505 votes making 2.1% of the total votes cast and the CPP parliamentary candidate Kweku Essuoun had 70 votes making 0.3% of the total votes cast.

=== 2020 elections ===
In the 2020 Ghanaian general elections, he won the Ekumfi Constituency parliamentary seat with 16,037 making 53.6% of the total votes cast whilst the NPP parliamentary candidate Francis Kingsley Ato Codjoe had 13,468 votes making 45.0% of the total votes cast, the GUM parliamentary candidate Regina Amoah had 371 votes making 1.2% of the total votes cast and the CPP parliamentary candidate Ibrahim Anderson had 48 votes making 0.2% of the total votes cast.

=== Committees ===
He is the Deputy Ranking member of the Privileges Committee and also a member of the Lands and Forestry Committee.

== Employment ==
He was the Head of Bio-fuel Solutions at Land Acquisition and Survey from 2007 to 2008. He is a Development Worker/Architect/Quantity Surveyor.

== Personal life ==
He is married with four children. He is a Christian (Methodist).
