= Twifo-Atti Morkwa (district) =

Twifo-Atti Morkwa District
- District
- Districts of Central Region

- Location of Twifo-Atti Morkwa within Central
- Coordinates: 5°36′41.76″N 1°32′58.56″W
- Country: Ghana
- Region: Central
- Capital: Twifo Praso

Population (2021)
  - Total: 100,851
- Time zone: UTC+0 (GMT)
- ISO 3166 code: GH-CP-__

Twifo-Atti Morkwa District is one of the twenty-two districts in Central Region, Ghana. Originally it was formerly part of the then-larger Twifo/Heman/Lower Denkyira District; until the southeast area of the district was split off to create Hemang-Lower Denkyira District on 28 June 2012; thus the remaining part has been renamed as Twifo-Atti Morkwa District. The district assembly is the northwest part of Central Region and has Twifo Praso as its capital town.
