= Twifo Praso =

- Town & District Capital
- Location of Twifo Praso in Central Region
- Coordinates: 05°37′00″N 01°33′00″W
- Country: Ghana
- Region: Central Region
- District: Twifo/Heman/Lower Denkyira District
- Time zone: GMT
  - Summer (DST): GMT

Twifu Praso is a town and is the district capital of Twifu/Atii/Morkwaa District Assembly of the Central Region of Ghana.

== Transport ==
Twifo Praso was previously served by a station on the central cross-country line of the national railway system. The railroad is presently defunct, although the rails are for the most part still present.

== See also ==
- Railway stations in Ghana
