= Gomoa East District =

Now Gomoa East Metropolitan Assembly Districts in Ghana, central region

Gomoa East Metropolitan Assembly
- Former district
- Districts of Central Region

- Location of Gomoa East District within Central
- Coordinates: 5°26′53.88″N 0°34′57.36″W
- Country: Ghana
- Region: Central
- Capital: Potsin

Government
  - District Executive: Solomon Darko-Quarm

Population (2021)
  - Total: 308,697
- Time zone: UTC+0 (GMT)
- ISO 3166 code: GH-CP-GE

Gomoa East Metropolitan Assembly is one of the twenty-two districts in Central Region, Ghana. Originally it was part of the then-larger Gomoa District in 1988, until the eastern part of the district was split off to create the first Gomoa East District, with Gomoa Afransi as its capital town, on 29 February 2008 (which was later split off into two new districts on 15 March 2018: Gomoa Central District (capital: Gomoa Afransi), and the present Gomoa East District (capital: Potsin); thus the remaining part has been renamed as Gomoa West District. The district assembly is located in the southeast part of Central Region and has Potsin as its capital town.

On 7 November 2024 the Gomoa East District was elevated from district assembly status to a metropolitan assembly (Gomoa East Metropolitan Assembly). It is the second metropolis in the central region, with Cape-Coast Metropolitan Assembly as the first in the central region.

== List of settlements ==
Settlements of Gomoa East District
No.	Settlement	Population	Population year
1	Abasa		
3	Akotsi		
4	Akramang		
5	Asebu		
6	Awombrew		
8	Buduburam		
9	Buduatta		
10	Dampase		
11	Ekroful		
12	Ekwamkrom		
13	Esiwukwa		
14	Fawomanye		
15	Gomoa Dabanyin		
16	Gomoa Amoanda		
17	Gomoa Dominase		
18	Gomoa Fetteh		
19	Gyaman		
20	Kobina Andoh		
21	Kweikrom		
22	Manso		
23	Milani		
24	Nsuem		
25	Nyanyano		
26	Obuase		
27	Ojobi		
28	Okyereko		
29	Potsin		
30	Gyaman		

== Sources ==
- "Gomoa East District". Statoids.
- District: Gomoa East District
