= Ekow Othniel Kwainoe =

Ekow Othniel Kwainoe (born 7 August 1980) is a Ghanaian politician and a member of the National Democratic Congress (NDC). He represents his constituency in the 9th Parliament of the 4th Republic.

== Early life and education ==
Ekow Othniel Kwainoe was born on 7 August 1980. He hails from Ekumfi Essakyir in the Central Region. He had his SSCE certificate at ST. Augustines college in 1998. He again moved to Central University College in 2003 for his BSC. Again, he went to Ghana Institute of Management and Public Administration for Master of Business Administration (MBA) in 2010. He therefore moved to Ballsbridge University for DR. OF PHILOSOPHY Phd in 2016. He went to Noble International Business School for Doctor of Business Administration (DBA) in 2027.

== Employment and career ==
Ekow Othniel worked Enoo Mutaku CO Limited as the Executive director. He got employed at Thesah Capital as the Chief Investment Officer. He worked in the Fidelity Bank as the Head Sales and Head Trading. He then went to Standard Chapter Bank West Africa as Director Rates and FX trading Hub.
