= Amoaku Obuadabang Larbi =

Ghanaian Politician

Amoaku Obuadabang Larbi (né Amoaku Ogyadu Obuadabang Larbi; born 16 June 1948) is a Ghanaian politician and member of the first parliament of the 4th Republic of Ghana. He represented Ayensuano Constituency in the Eastern Region of Ghana.

== Early life and education ==
Larbi was born on 16 June 1948 in the Eastern Region of Ghana. He attained his GCE Ordinary Level at Apam Secondary School.

== Politics ==
Larbi was elected member of the first parliament to represent Ayensuano constituency in the 1992 Ghanaian Parliamentary Elections under the membership of the National Democratic Congress and he assumed office on 7 January 1993.
