= Felix Kwakye Ofosu =

Ghanaian politician

Felix Kwakye Ofosu is a Ghanaian politician who won the 2024 parliamentary election as the MP of Abura Asebu-Kwamankese Constituency under the ticket of National Democratic Congress with 11,100 votes. He is also the former Deputy Information Minister under the National Democratic Congress (NDC) in the John Dramani Mahama Administration. He is currently the Minister of State in charge of Government Communication.

In 2026, Kwakye Ofosu stated that LGBTQ+ issues were not a priority for most Ghanaians, explaining that government attention was focused on addressing more pressing socio-economic challenges facing the country.In the same year, he rejected calls by the New Patriotic Party (NPP) Minority for him to apologise over comments related to the anti-LGBTQ bill, describing the criticism as politically motivated and questioning the NPP’s record on the passage of the bill during its time in government.
