= Hemang =

Coordinates: 5.4836°N 1.5328°W

Twifo ntafrewaso oil city
- Town
- Interactive map of Twifo ntafrewaso
- Country: Ghana
- Region: Central Region

Twifo ntafrewaso is a town in the Central region of Ghana. The town is known for the twifo oil palm plantation(TOPP). The school is a second cycle institution.
