= Twifo-Atii Morkwaa (Ghana parliament constituency) =

Constituency in the Central Region of Ghana

Twifo-Atti Morkwaa
- constituency for the Parliament of Ghana
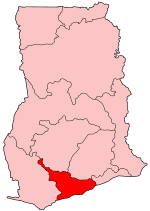
- District: Twifo-Atti Morkwaa District
- Region: Central Region of Ghana

Current constituency
- Party: National Democratic Congress (NDC).
- MP: David T. D. Vondee

Twifo-Atti Morkwa is a constituency represented in the Parliament of Ghana. It elects one Member of Parliament (MP) by the first past the post system of election. The Twifo/Atti-Morkwa constituency is located in the Twifo/Atti-Morkwa District of the Central Region of Ghana.

== Boundaries ==
The seat is bounded on the north by the Upper Denkyira East Municipality on the south by the Hemang Lower Denkyira District, on the west by the Mpohor Wassa East District, and on the east by the Assin North Municipality and Assin South District of the Central Region of Ghana.

== Members of Parliament ==
Election	Member	Party
2004	Elizabeth Amoah Tetteh	National Democratic Congress
2008	Elizabeth Amoah Tetteh	National Democratic Congress
2012	Samuel Ato Amoah	National Democratic Congress
2016	Abraham Dwuma Odoom	New Patriotic Party
2020	David T. D. Vondee	National Democratic Congress

== Elections ==
2004 Ghanaian parliamentary election:Twifo-Atti Morkwaa Constituency Sources:Peace Fm Online
Party	Candidate	Votes	%	±%
National Democratic Congress	Elizabeth Amoah Tetteh	15,811	51.90	
New Patriotic Party	ABRAHAM DWUMA ODOOM	13,086	42.90	
Convention People's Party	ROSE BUAH-BASSUAH	1,577	5.20	

2008 Ghanaian parliamentary election:Twifo-Atti Morkwaa Constituency Sources:Peace Fm Online
Party	Candidate	Votes	%	±%
National Democratic Congress	Elizabeth Amoah Tetteh	14,724	51.42	
New Patriotic Party	ABRAHAM DWUMA ODOOM	13,309	46.48	
Convention People's Party	KWABENA AGYEI BOAFO	599	2.09	

2012 Ghanaian parliamentary election:Twifo-Atti Morkwaa Constituency Sources:Peace Fm Online
Party	Candidate	Votes	%	±%
National Democratic Congress	SAMUEL ATO AMOAH	19,410	56.16	
New Patriotic Party	FRANCIS OWUSU-MENSAH	15,150	43.84	
National Democratic Party	SETH KWAME OFORI	0	0.00	

2016 Ghanaian parliamentary election:Twifo-Atti Morkwaa Constituency Sources:Peace Fm Online
Party	Candidate	Votes	%	±%
New Patriotic Party	ABRAHAM DWUMA ODOOM	21,231	58.16	
National Democratic Congress	SAMUEL ATO AMOAH	14,887	40.78	
Progressive People's Party	ABU AYUBA	273	0.75	
Convention People's Party	EBENEZER APPIAH	115	0.32	

== See also ==
- List of Ghana Parliament constituencies
