= Apam =

Apam Apaa (pronounced Are-paahn)
- Town and District Capital
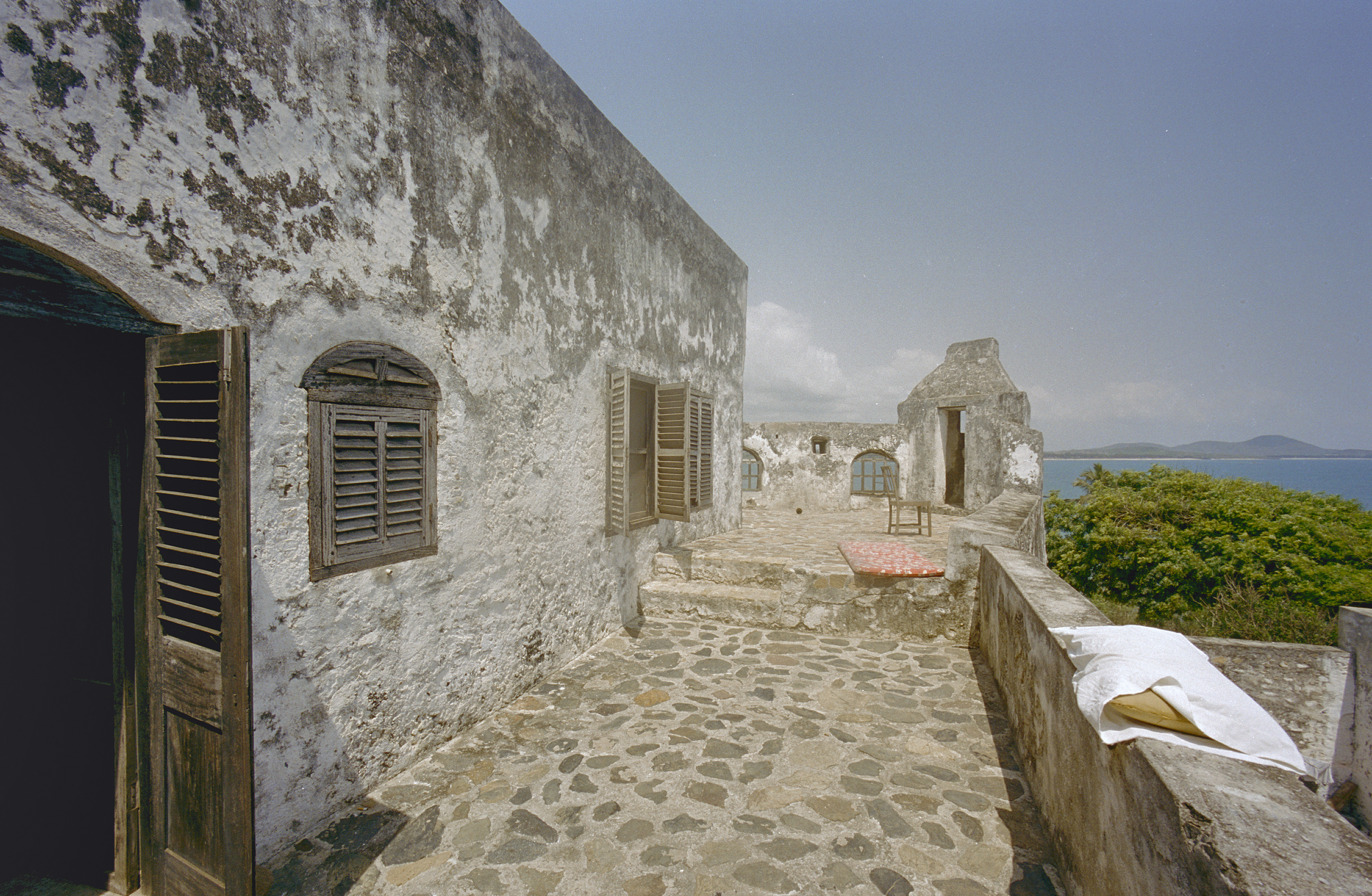
- Fort Lijdzaamheid or Fort Patience in Apam

- Location of Apam in Central Region
- Coordinates: 5°16′44″N 0°44′23″W
- Country: Ghana
- Region: Central Region
- District: Gomoa West District

Population (2013)
  - Total: 26,466
- Time zone: Greenwich Mean Time
  - Summer (DST): GMT

Apam is a coastal town and capital of Gomoa West District in the Central Region of Ghana, located approximately 45 kilometers east of the Central Region capital, Cape Coast.

Apam is the site of Fort Lijdzaamheid or Fort Patience, a Dutch-built fort which was completed in 1702, which dominates the fishing harbor and town from a rocky peninsula located on the south side of the town. It was a major port prior to independence, but after Tema was built, shipping was forbidden. The current chief of Apam is called Nana Ekow Payne. It is also a major town in the Gomoa Akyempem Paramountcy. There are many fishermen as fishing is the main industry. Apam has a Secondary School called Apam Senior High School, an FM station, Apaman tv, several churches and a salt-winning industry. The Benyah Lagoon is used to produce salt. Apam have the biggest pusuban in Ghana and is located in the central region of Ghana.

FESTIVAL OF GOMOA APAM

Apam Akwambo festival is celebrated by the chiefs and peoples of Gomoa Apam in the Central region of Ghana. The festival is celebrated in the month of September every year. People in Apam, in the Central Region, celebrate the Akwambo, which literally means "path-clearing."

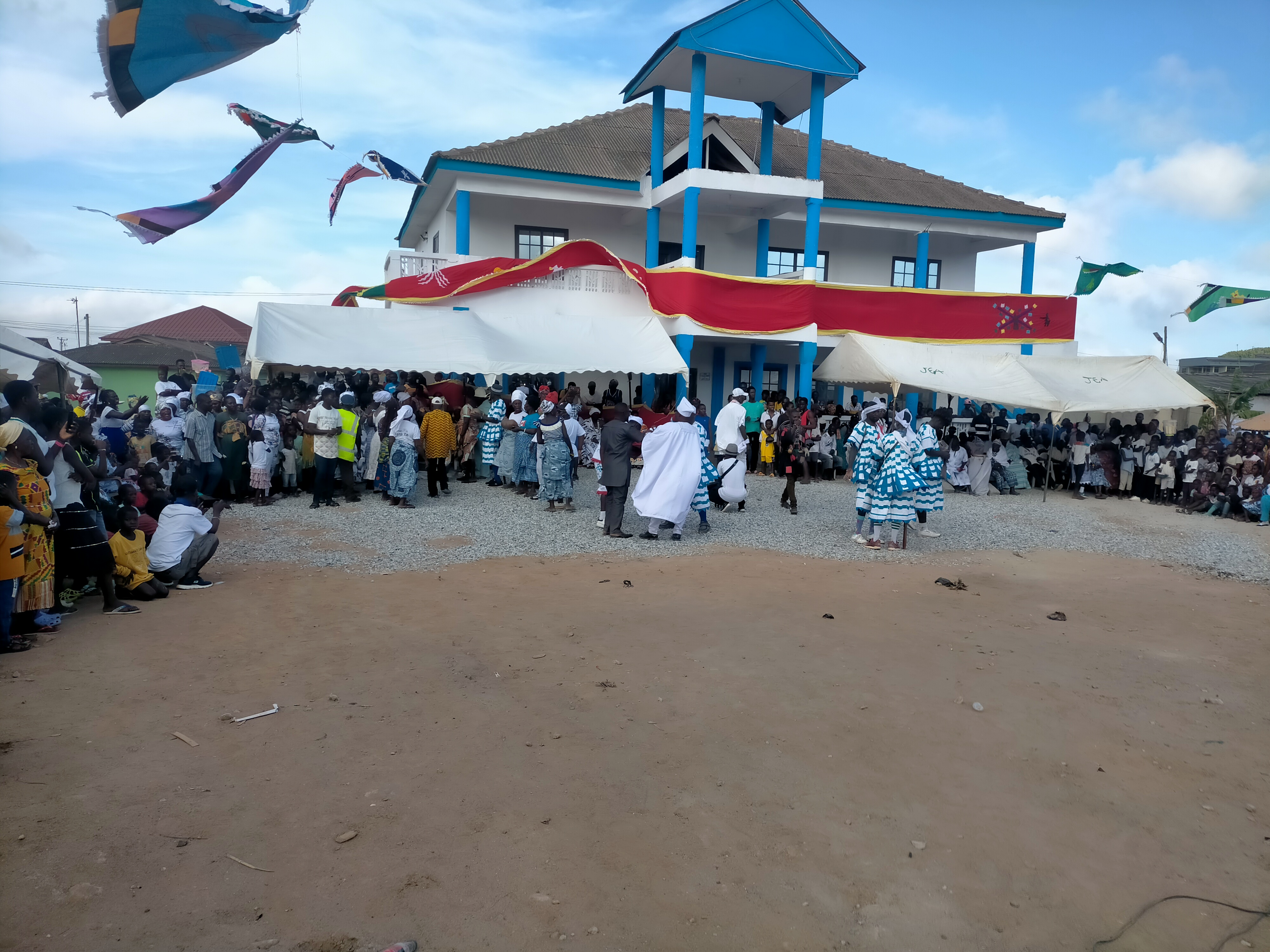
Asafo no. 1

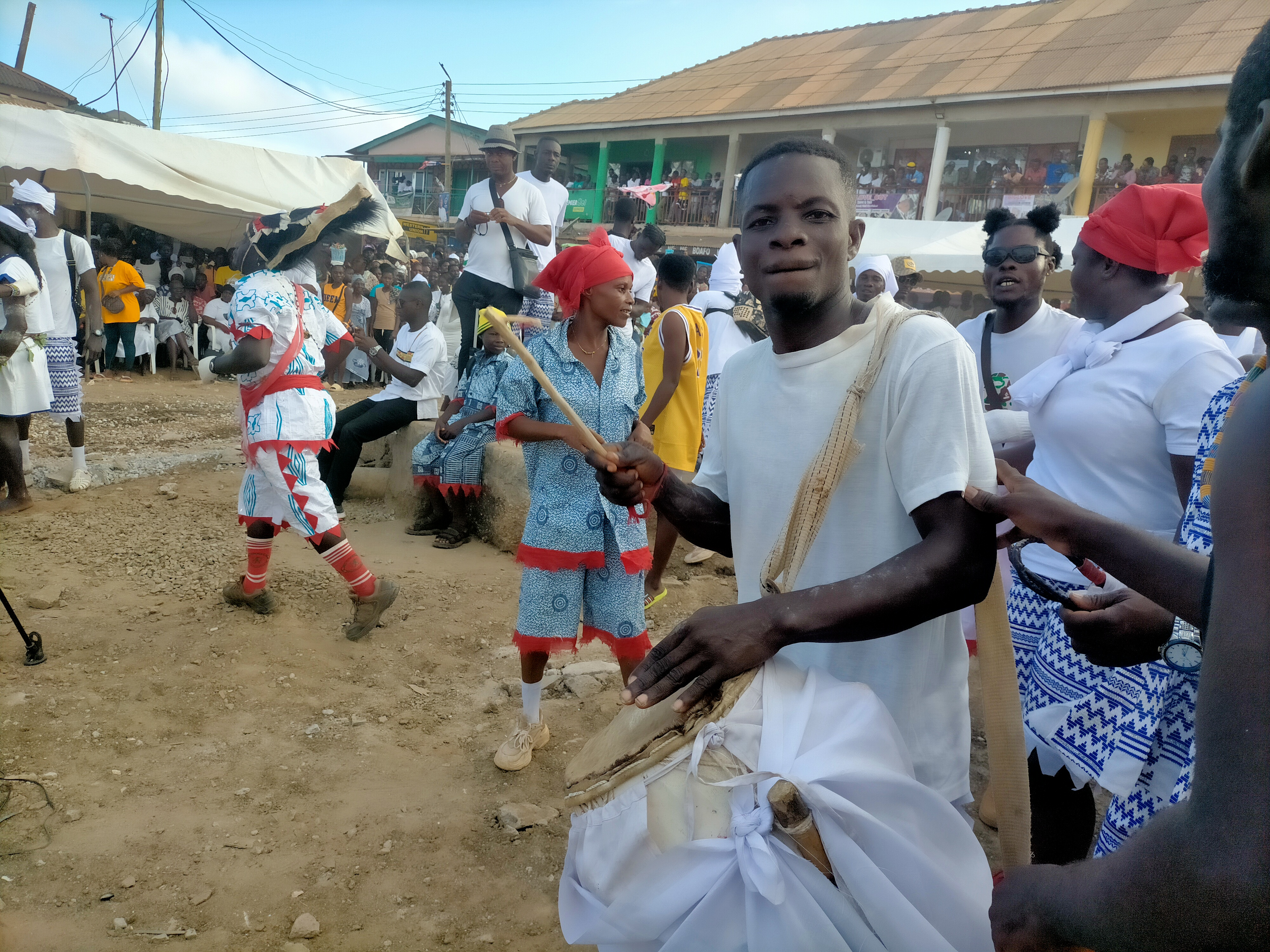
asafo no.1

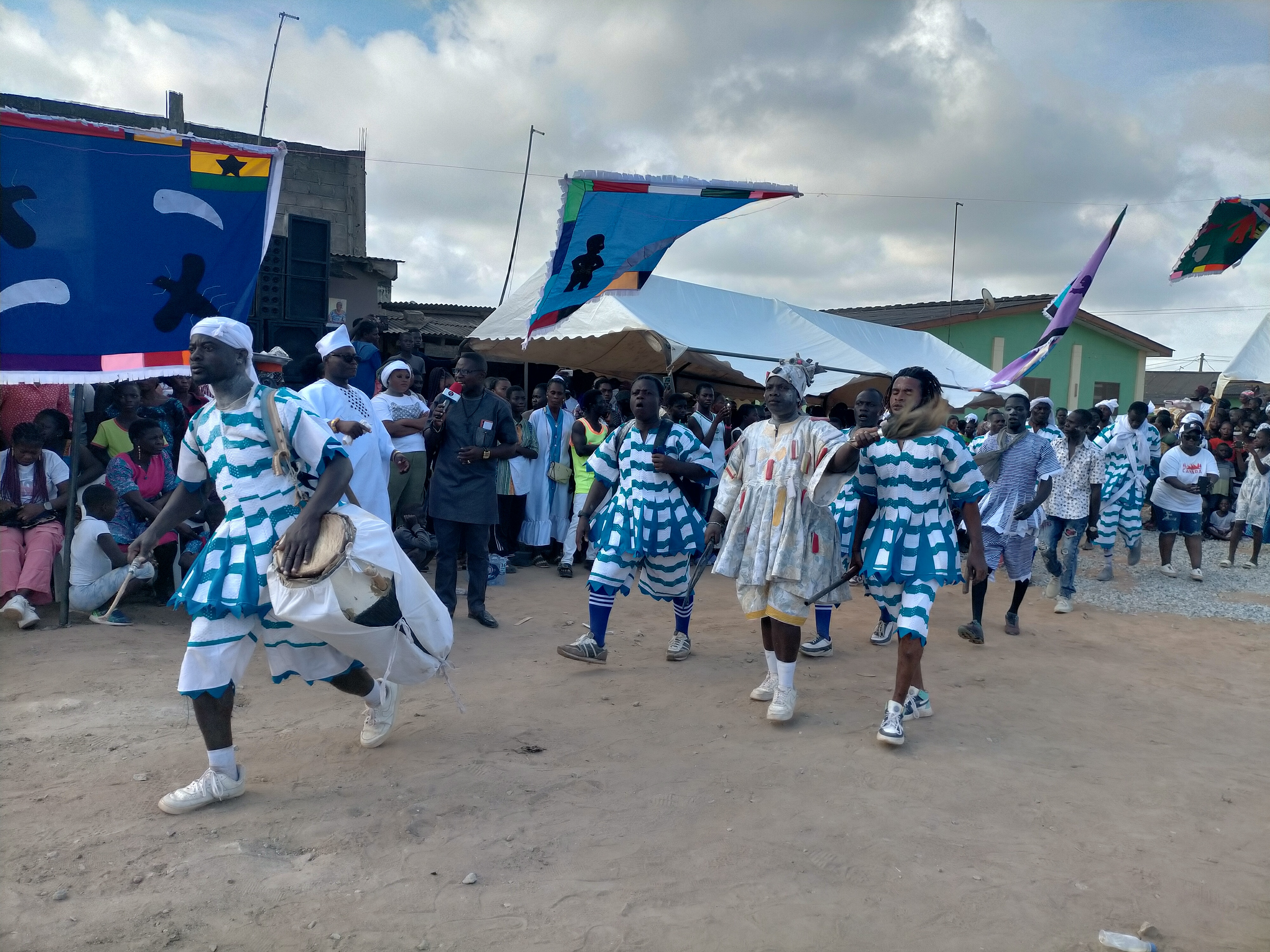
safohen of asafo no 1

In apam there are traditionally two asafo companies: Tuafo and Denstifo Each company is headed by a superior captain ("Supi") and under the Supi is a captain ("Safohen").

== Climatic Condition ==
The tropical wet and dry climate of Apam, with its proximity to the Gulf of Guinea, is characterized by notable seasonal variations and a savanna-like landscape.

=== Temperature ===
Warmer temperatures have been recorded in the area, indicating a shift towards a warmer climate, and this is contributing to a notable temperature trend in Apam.
