= Gomoa West District =

- Former District
- Districts of Central Region

- Location of Gomoa West District within Central
- Coordinates: 5°16′44.5″N 0°44′23.0″W
- Country: Ghana
- Region: Central
- Capital: Apam

Government
  - District Executive: Alhaji Mohammed Kassim

Population (2021)
  - Total: 129,512
- Time zone: UTC+0 (GMT)
- ISO 3166 code: GH-CP-GW

Gomoa West District is one of the twenty-two districts in Central Region, Ghana. Originally it was formerly part of the then-larger Gomoa District in 1988, until the eastern part of the district was split off to create the first Gomoa East District, with Gomoa Afransi as its capital town, on 29 February 2008 (which was later split off into two new districts on 15 March 2018: Gomoa Central District (capital: Gomoa Afransi), and the present Gomoa East District (capital: Potsin)); thus the remaining part has been renamed as Gomoa West District. Its population is 44,834 people. The district assembly is located in the southeast part of Central Region and has Apam as its capital town.

== List of settlements ==
Settlements of Gomoa West District
No.	Settlement	Population	Population year
1	Ankamu	13,029	2008
2	Apam	25,869	2013
3	Asebu		
4	Dawurampong	17,766	2008
5	Gomoa Tarkwa		
6	Eshiem	23,215	2008
7	Gomoa Techiman		
8	Mumford	11,845	2008
9	Onyadze		
10	Abrekum		
11	Dago	7,343	2008
12	Assin	15,872	2008
13	Bewadze		
14	Adaa		
15	Ohua		
16	Brofo		
17	Oleifreku		

== List of schools ==
The following are list of Senior High Schools located within the Gomoa West District:

Senior secondary schools

1. Apam Senior High School (public)
2. Charity Senior High School (private)
3. Gomoa Secondary Technical Senior High School (public)
4. Mozano Senior High School (public)
5. Mumford Community Senior High School (public)

Junior secondary schools

1. Apam Methodist School
2. Apam Catholic School
3. Apam Anglican School
4. Apam Salvation Army School
5. Apam Presby School
6. Royal Preparatory School
7. Genesis Preparatory School
8. Faith Academy School
9. Odina/Oguaa Mozama Pry&J.H.S
10. Gomoa Dunkwa
11. Gomoa Enyeme SDA Primary School
12. Gomoa Enyeme L/A Junior High School
13. WOP Methodist "A" Primary & JHS
14. WOP Methodist "B" Primary & JHS
15. SDA Primary School - Osedze
