= Potsin =

Coordinates: 5°27′N 0°35′W

- Town
- Interactive map of Potsin
- Country: Ghana
- Region: Central Region

Potsin is a town in the Central region of Ghana. The town is known for the Potsin T.I. Ahmadiya Secondary School. The school is a second cycle institution.
