= Afransi =

- Town and District Capital
- Location of Afransi in Central Region
- Coordinates: 5°31′N 0°45′W
- Country: Ghana
- Region: Central Region
- District: Gomoa East District
- Elevation: 300 ft (90 m)
- Demonym: Afransian
- Time zone: GMT
  - Summer (DST): GMT
- Ethnicity: Akan people

Afransi is a small town and is the capital of Gomoa East district in the Central Region of Ghana.
