= Abura-Asebu-Kwamankese (Ghana parliament constituency) =

Constituency in the Central Region of Ghana

Abura/Asebu/Kwamankese
- constituency for the Parliament of Ghana
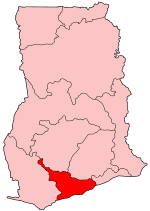
- District: Abura/Asebu/Kwamankese District
- Region: Central Region of Ghana

Current constituency
- Party: National Democratic Congress (NDC)
- MP: Felix Kwakye Ofosu

Abura-Asebu-Kwamankese is one of the constituencies represented in the Parliament of Ghana. It elects one Member of Parliament (MP) by the first past the post system of election. Felix Kwakye Ofosu is the current member of parliament for the Abura-Asebu-Kwamankese constituency. He was elected on the ticket of the National Democratic Congress (NDC) and won with 11,100 votes in the 2024 parliamentary elections to become the MP. He won against Eric Kobina Nyanteh who intended to represent the constituency in the 4th Republic parliament on the ticket of the New Patriotic Party (NPP).

== See also ==
- List of Ghana Parliament constituencies
