= Central Region (Ghana) =

Region of Ghana

Coordinates: 5°30′N 1°00′W

- Region
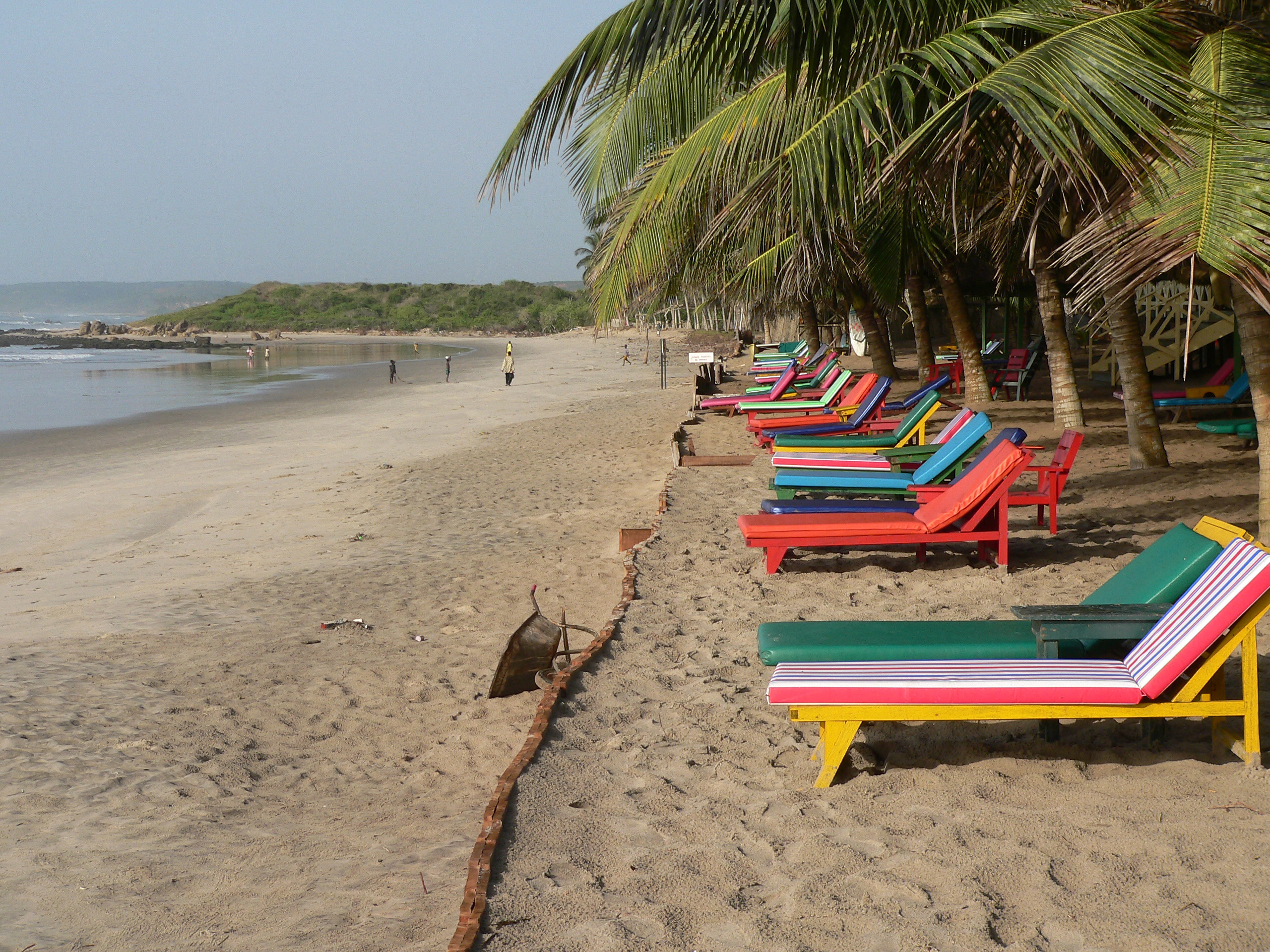

- Location of Central Region in Ghana
- Country: Ghana
- Capital: Cape Coast
- Districts: 17

Government
  - Regional Minister: Ekow Panyin Okyere Eduamoah

Area
  - Total: 9,826 km^{2} (3,794 sq mi)
  - Rank: Ranked 8th

Population (2021 Census)
  - Total: 2,859,821
  - Rank: Ranked 4th
  - Density: 291.0/km^{2} (753.8/sq mi)

GDP (PPP)
  - Year: 2013
  - Per capita: $5,150

GDP (Nominal)
  - Year: 2013
  - Per capita: $3,500
- Time zone: GMT
- Area code: 033
- ISO 3166 code: GH-CP
- HDI (2017): 0.633 medium · 5th

The Central Region is one of the 16 administrative regions of Ghana. Ashanti and Eastern regions border it to the north, Western region to the west, Greater Accra region to the east, and the Gulf of Guinea to the south. The Central Region has an economy based on industrial minerals and tourism. The Central region has tourist attractions including castles, forts and beaches along the region's coastline.

== Economy and tourism ==
The Central Region is a hub of education. Its economy is dominated by services, followed by mining and fishing. Cape Coast Castle and Elmina Castle are prominent UNESCO World Heritage Sites and serve as a reminder of the Trans-Atlantic slave trade. The Central Region is a center for tourism within Ghana, with Kakum National Park and beach developments.

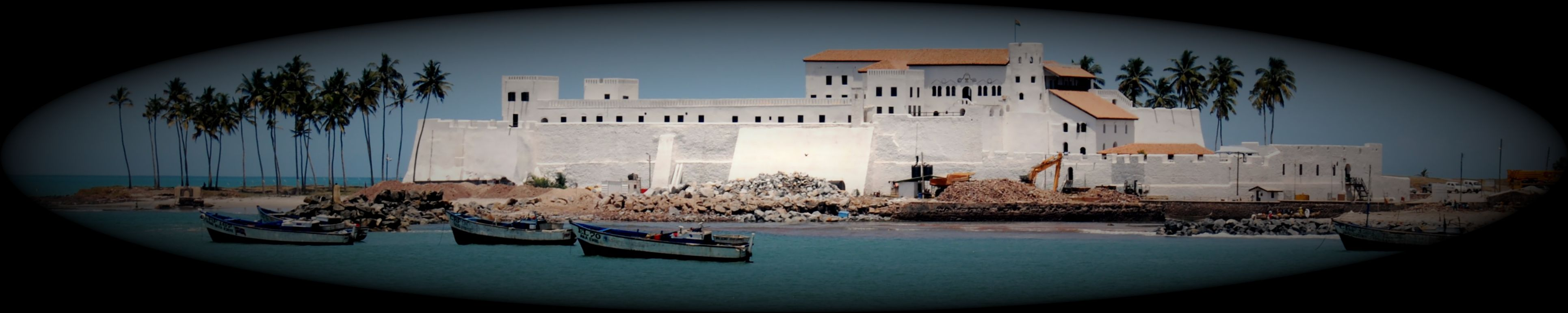
Panorama of Elmina Castle that was erected by Portuguese in 1482 as São Jorge da Mina (St. George of the Mine) Castle, also known simply as Mina or Feitoria da Mina) in present-day Elmina, Ashantiland (formerly the Gold Coast region). It was the first trading post built on the Gulf of Guinea, so is the oldest European building in existence below the Sahara. First established as a trade settlement, the castle later became one of the stops on the route of the Atlantic slave trade. The Dutch seized the fort from the Portuguese in 1637, and took over all the Portuguese Gold Coast in 1642. The slave trade continued under the Dutch people until 1814. Later, Elmina Castle is a historical site, and was a filming location for Werner Herzog's 1987 drama film Cobra Verde. The castle is recognized by UNESCO as a World Heritage Site.

== Administrative divisions ==
Districts of the Central Region

The political administration of the region is through the local government system. Under this administration system, the region is divided into 22 MMDA's (made up of 1 Metropolitan, 7 Municipal and 14 District Assemblies). Each District, Municipal or Metropolitan Assembly, is administered by a Chief Executive, representing the central government but deriving authority from an Assembly headed by a presiding member elected from among the members themselves. The list is as follows:

District	Capital	Constituency	Member of Parliament	Party
Abura Asebu Kwamankese	Abura-Dunkwa	Abura-Asebu-Kwamankese	Elvis Morris Donkoh	NPP
Agona East	Nsaba	Agona East	Queenstar Pokua Sawyerr	NDC
Agona West Municipal	Agona Swedru	Agona West	Ernestina Ofori Dangbey	NDC
Ajumako Enyan Essiam	Ajumako	Ajumako-Enyan-Essiam	Cassiel Ato Baah Forson	NDC
Asikuma Odoben Brakwa	Breman Asikuma	Asikuma-Odoben-Brakwa	Alhassan Kobina Ghansah	NDC
Assin Central Municipal	Assin Foso	Assin Central	Kennedy Ohene Agyapong	NPP
Assin North	Assin Bereku	Assin North	James Gyakye Quayson	NDC
Assin South	Nsuaem Kyekyewere	Assin South	John Ntim Fordjuor	NPP
Awutu Senya East Municipal	Kasoa	Awutu-Senya East	Mavis Hawa Koomson	NPP
Awutu Senya West	Awutu Breku	Awutu-Senya West	Gizella Tetteh Agbotui	NDC
Cape Coast Metropolitan	Cape Coast	Cape Coast North	Kwamena Minta Nyarku	NDC
Cape Coast Metropolitan	Cape Coast	Cape Coast South	Kweku George Ricketts-Hagan	NDC
Effutu Municipal	Winneba	Effutu	Alexander Afenyo-Markin (Deputy Majority Leader)	NPP
Ekumfi	Apam	Ekumfi	Abeiku Crenstil	NDC
Gomoa East	Potsin	Gomoa East	Desmond De-graft Paitoo	NDC
Gomoa Central	Afransi	Gomoa Central	Naana Eyiah Quansah	NPP
Gomoa West	Esakyir	Gomoa West	Richard Gyan Mensah	NDC
Komenda-Edina-Eguafo-Abirem Municipal	Elmina	Komenda-Edina-Eguafo-Abirem	Samuel Atta Mills	NDC
Mfantsiman Municipal	Saltpond	Mfantseman	Ophelia Hayford	NPP
Twifo Atti Morkwa	Twifo Praso	Twifo-Atii Morkwaa	T.D. David Vondee	NDC
Twifo/Heman/Lower Denkyira	Hemang	Hemang Lower Denkyira	Bright Wireko Brobbey	NPP
Upper Denkyira East Municipal	Dunkwa-on-Offin	Upper Denkyira East	Festus Awuah Kwofie	NPP
Upper Denkyira West	Diaso	Upper Denkyira West	Daniel Ohene Darko	NDC
