= Akweesi =

- Born: 1780; Esiwahyia, Gold Coast
- Died: 1896 (aged 115–116); Gold Coast
- Occupations: farmer; clergyman
- Spouse: Andowa

Ecclesiastical career
- Church: Wesleyan Methodist Church
- Ordained: 1851

Akweesi (known late in life as "the Grand Old Man", whose lifespan is given by his biographer as 1780–1896) was a Fante who lived in Ekumfi State. Akweesi is noted as an early Methodist minister in what is now Ghana, and for his role in destroying the traditional Fante sacred grove Nananom Pɔw, characterised by J. Kwabena Asamoah-Gyadu as "one of the best known clashes" between Christianity and traditional religion in the history of the region that would become Ghana.

== Sources ==
Akweesi's life is known from oral traditions, and to a lesser extent documentary sources, collected around 1952, primarily from his descendants, by the Ghanaian teacher John Brandford Crayner. Crayner's view of events associated with Akweesi has been criticised as Christian and colonialist.

== Family ==
Akweesi's mother was Asikan and his father was Kyia. He was born in the village of Esiwahyia, where he farmed gourds, gaining wealth through this practice and becoming a prominent money-lender. He married Andowa, a Fante from the town of Asokwa and from the Adwenadze clan. His children included Nana Asikan and, last-born, Mary Akweesi (also known as Adwoa Asekan).

== Alleged witchcraft and foundation of Obidan ==
According to his biographer, Akweesi's high yields, and the discontent of his debtors, led him to be accused of witchcraft. He moved to nearby Nanaben to live with his uncle Egyir, but in November 1834 Akweesi was accused of causing the death of Egyir's daughter Kwakoma (allegedly because Egyir hoped that Akweesi would be killed and that Egyir would gain his wealth). Akweesi was attacked at Kwakoma's funeral and left for dead, but rescued by his nephew Abedu Kuma. Akweesi moved to relatives in Asaafa, around five miles south of Mankessim.

Seeking to clear Akweesi's name, Abedu Kuma and Akweesi consulted with traditional priests first at Akorodo and then, in December 1839, at Nananom Pɔw, but Akweesi continued to be identified as a witch. Following his identification as a witch at Nananom Pɔw, Akweesi was attacked, imprisoned, robbed of his possessions, and his home in Asaafa was burned down. Akweesi's wife Andowa escaped to Eminsano, home of one Asari Kofi. Asari rescued Akweesi and gave him shelter. Akweesi was also blamed for misfortunes befalling Asari's family, and Asari received abuse for harbouring Akweesi.

Seeking to free Asari of opprobrium, on the third week of February 1840, Akweesi petitioned the chief (ɔdekuro) of Suprudu for land where he could settle alone. The chief sold him land half a mile north of Nananom Pɔw called Nsebɔ Buw Mu ("the den of tigers"), which was noted as a haunt of tigers and wolves and generally viewed as too dangerous to settle. Akweesi and his family settled there on the third Monday of March and prospered, partly due to ready access to fishing in the Eminsa Ɔkye river and the agricultural opportunities of the surrounding swampland. Akweesi accrued greater wealth here than he had had before and came to be joined by many of his extended family, including his uncle Egyir, with whom he reconciled. Akweesi renamed the settlement Obi Dan Obi ("a man is dependant") or Obidan in recognition of his former enemies' reliance on him, a name that persisted at least into the 1970s.

== Conversion to Christianity and destruction of Nanamom Pɔw ==
On a Monday in April 1845, Obidan was visited by the Methodist missionary Kwesiar Ata, who had been converted by John Hayfron, leading the inhabitants to convert to Christianity. Thomas Birch Freeman became a regular preacher in the village; Kwesiar Ata later married Akweesi's granddaughter Kweedwuwa.

One Wednesday in August 1851, Akweesi accompanied Kwesiar Ata into the sacred grove of Nananom Pɔw to retrieve a deer that Kewsiar Ata had been hunting; Akweesi also chopped some timber there. This led Chief Nana Edu of Mankessim, the paramount chief of the Fante, to attack Obidan during their church service one Sunday later that month, arresting Akweesi and many of the Christians, burning down the settlement and its crops, appropriating the inhabitants' possessions, and imprisoning many of the men of Obidan in Mankessim. Other inhabitants of Obidan, including Akweesi's wife, fled to Anomabu Castle, the local seat of the British colonial authorities and the local base for Thomas Freeman's missionising. Learning of the situation, the government police proceeded from Anomabu to Edu's seat at Mankessim, ordering the freeing of the prisoners and fining Edu £18. The prisoners took refuge in Anomabu, partly in the house of John Hayfron, where they were attacked once more. A trial followed, at which the authorities "bound over" Edu "in the sum of £118 to keep the peace". The British authorities protected Akweesi's return to Obidan and equipped him, in the words of his biographer, "to go and clear the sacred grove and every place where the practices were done", an activity subsequently endorsed by Nana Edu, who himself converted to Christianity.

== Ordination ==
Akweesi was ordained as a Methodist minister of Obidan on Sunday, 21 September 1851, though he continued to wear traditional Fante clothing. He "continued to preach in Obidan for many years".
