= Samuel Mensah =

Samuel Mensah may refer to:

- Samuel Mensiro (born 1989), Ghanaian footballer, formerly known as Samuel Mensah
- Samuel Atta Mensah (born 1999), Ghanaian footballer
- Samuel Sallas Mensah (born 1954), Ghanaian politician

== See also ==
- Samuel Attah-Mensah, Ghanaian media personality, businessman and lecturer
- Samuel Ofosu-Mensah, Ghanaian politician
