= Mankessim Senior High Technical School =

Public high school in Central Region, Ghana

Location
- R80 / P.O.BOX 50 / 7XHF+XQ; Mankessim; Mfantseman Municipality, Central Region; Ghana
- 5°16′47.91″N 1°1′31.87″W

Information
- Former name: Mankessim Secondary Technical School
- School type: Public Secondary / High School
- Motto: Nyansapɔw, wɔsano Ɔbadwemba (The wisdom knot can be unraveled only by the prudent)
- Established: 7 January 1991; 35 years ago
- Founder: Jerry Rawlings
- Status: Active; Day/Boarding
- Oversight: Ghana Education Service
- Authorizer: Ministry of Education
- School number: 0030303
- Head teacher: Mr Alexander Agyemang Duah
- Teaching staff: 83 (2017)
- Gender: Mixed
- Enrollment: 2000+
- Language: English
- Colors: Green and Yellow
- Nickname: MANSTECH
- Alumni name: MANSTOSA (Mankessim Senior High Technical Old Students Association)

Mankessim Senior High Technical School (MSHTS; formerly called Mankessim Secondary Technical School and popularly referred to as MANSTECH)is a public mixed-sex school located in Mankessim along the Mankessim-Dominase road within the Mfantseman Municipality of Central Region, Ghana. It was established in 1991 by the then PNDC Government of Ghana led by Flt. Lt. Jerry John Rawlings. The school was originally established to run technical and general career programs, thus, the inaugural courses comprised Technical, Agricultural Science and Home Economics. However, over the years, more courses like Visual Arts, General Arts, Business and General Science have been added to meet the increasing demands of the surrounding population. Manstech serves or admits both day and boarding students. The mission statement of the school is “to provide quality education: social, emotional, physical, religious/moral for all irrespective of tribe, religious creed and sex and to work assiduously to produce holistic individuals capable of passing their exam with good results”.

== History ==
In the late 1980s, after a period of relative political stability and availability of international donor support, the then head of state of Ghana, Flt. Lt. Jerry John Rawlings proposed new educational reforms. This culminated into the 1987 Education Act which aimed at actualizing the 1974 Dzobo committee's recommendations. The primary objective was to improve literacy levels in Ghana by making pre-tertiary education more concise and practical. A campaign was consequently launched that reduced pre-tertiary education from 17 to 12 years and vocational education appeared in Junior High School.

With the new educational reforms in effect, the head of state proposed setting up new secondary/high schools that would focus on fulfilling his dream of making secondary education more practical, rather than grammar-based especially for young people in the country. This resulted in the establishment of a number of secondary technical schools across the country of which Mankessim Senior High Technical School was part.

Manstech was officially established on 7 January 1991. Some chiefs and notable locals along with the Municipal (District) Assembly, supplemented the efforts of government in setting up of the school. The Mankessim state provided the necessary land space where the school was built. Nana Kwaa Annan VII, the Kyidomhen of Mankessim Traditional Area, the late Ebusuapanyin Ebo Imbeah of the Nsona Pakesedo Royal family and Opanyin Kobina Ayew for instance, together donated a total of sixty-four (64) acres of land on which the school now stands. In addition, the paramount chief of Mankessim Traditional Area along with those of Nkusukum, Dominase, and Ekumfi provided a great deal of support for the establishment of the school. Furthermore, two local government officials at the time, provided the needed administrative assistance and resources that effectively got the project started. They included District Chief Executives Miss Sarah Kuntu Arthur (who was instrumental in securing a grant of ¢4,000,000.00 [Four Million Cedis - old currency] from the District Assembly to cover the initial constructional costs of the school) and Mrs. Susan Des Bordes (who championed the construction of the Home Economics' and Visual Arts' blocks).

Moreover, the establishment of the school also attracted the interests and support of international organizations such as the Canadian High Commission and the Japan International Cooperation Agency (JICA). The former built the Canada Block which hosts several classrooms while the latter constructed the Science Block (also called the Gunna Prefecture).

At the launch of the school, the late W. E Otchere was appointed as the first headmaster. The school started with a student population of 32 (28 boys and 4 girls) spread across three programs namely: Agricultural Science, Technical and Home Economics. It is also important to add that, at the launch of the school, the adopted motto of Manstech was "Ɔbra nye woara abɔ", to wit, 'Life is what you make it'. However, since the motto was the same as that of a nearby sister school, Mfantsiman Girls' Senior High School, an agreement was reached to change the school's motto to the current one, "Nyansapɔw, wɔsano Ɔbadwemba", translated as "The wisdom knot can be unraveled only by the prudent". The change in motto happened during the tenure of Nana Adoko, the second headmaster of the school. Nana Adoko is also credited for the design of the current school logo.

== Programs ==
No.	Name	Year Introduced	Elective Courses Taught	Comment
1.	Technical	1991	Building Construction, Engineering Science, Mathematics (Elective), Metalwork, Physics, and Woodwork.	Pioneer program.
2.	Agricultural Science	1991	Agribusiness, Animal Husbandry, Chemistry, General Agriculture, Horticulture, and Mathematics (Elective).	Pioneer program.
3.	Home Economics	1991	Foods and Nutrition, Economics, General Knowledge-In-Art, and Management-In-Living.	Pioneer program.
4.	Visual Arts	1996?	Basketry, Ceramics and Sculpture, Economics, French, General Knowledge-In-Art, Graphic Design, Leatherwork, Literature In English, Picture Making, and Textiles.	
5.	General Arts	1997	Christian Religious Studies, Economics, Fante, French, Geography, Government, History, Literature In English, and Mathematics (Elective).	
6.	Business	2003?	Business Management, Accounting, Economics, French, Mathematics (Elective), and Principles of Costing.	
7.	General Science	2003?	Biology, Chemistry, Mathematics (Elective), and Physics.	It was discontinued and reintroduced in 2012?

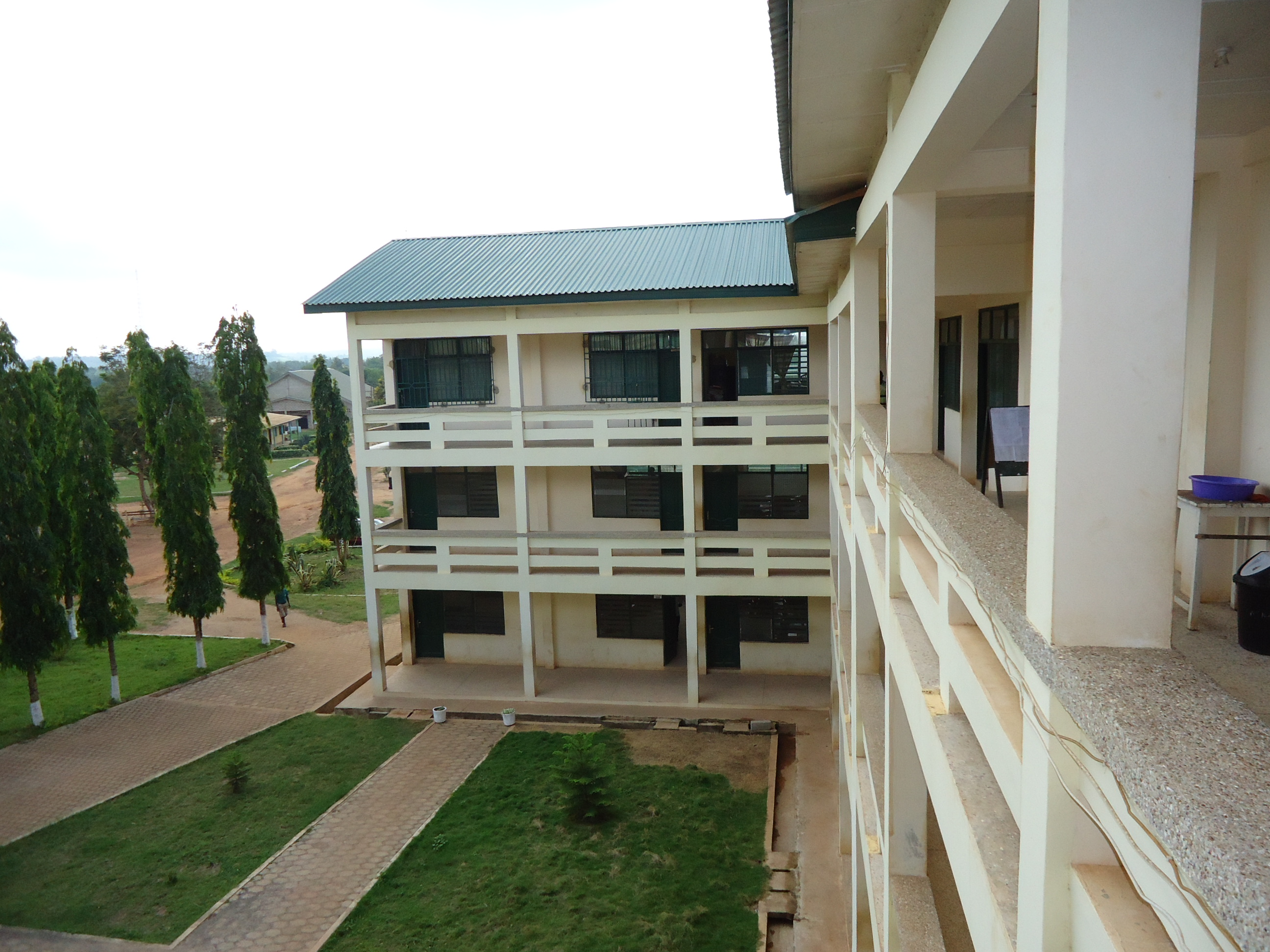
Administration and Academic Block

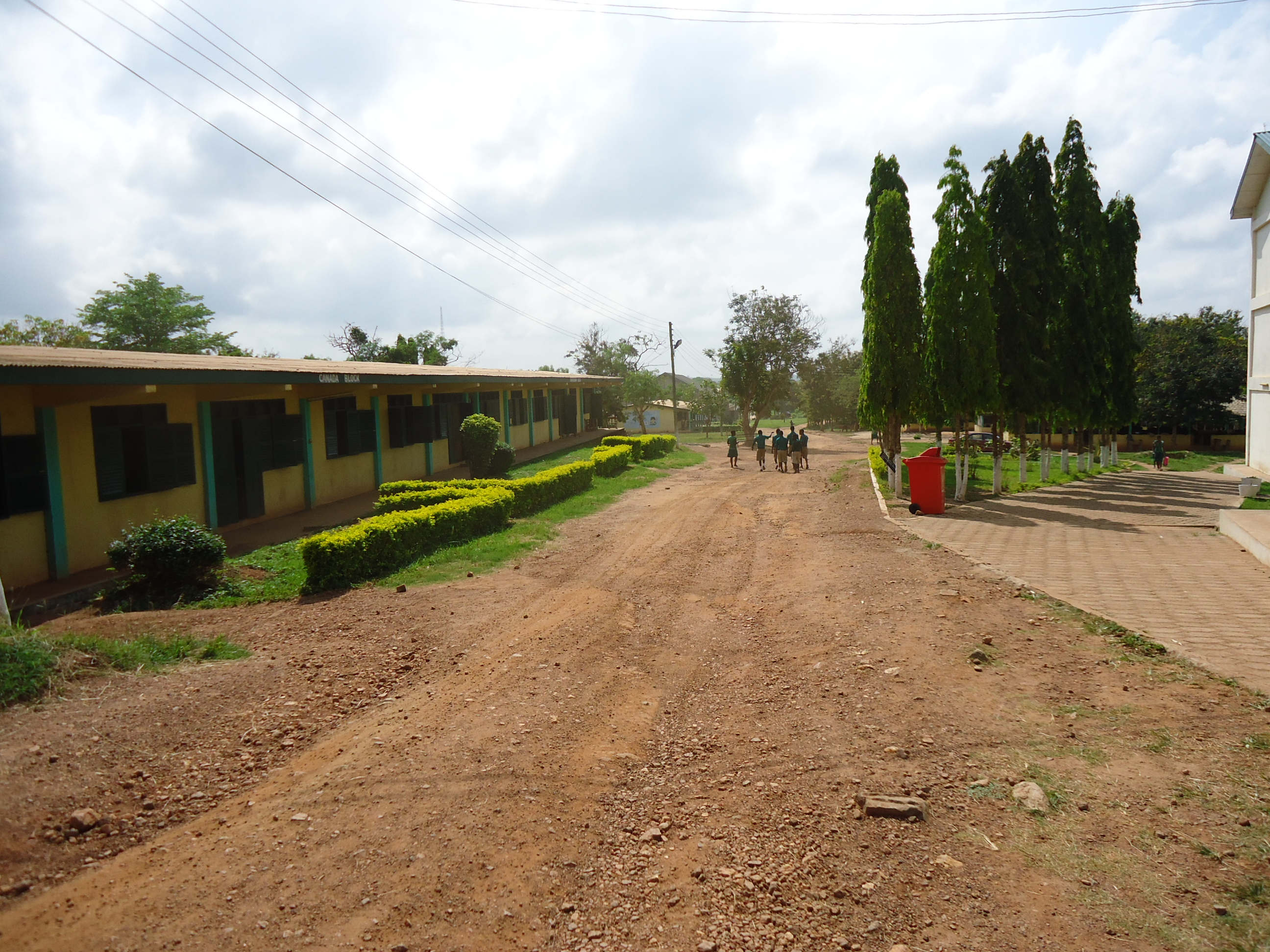
Canada Block

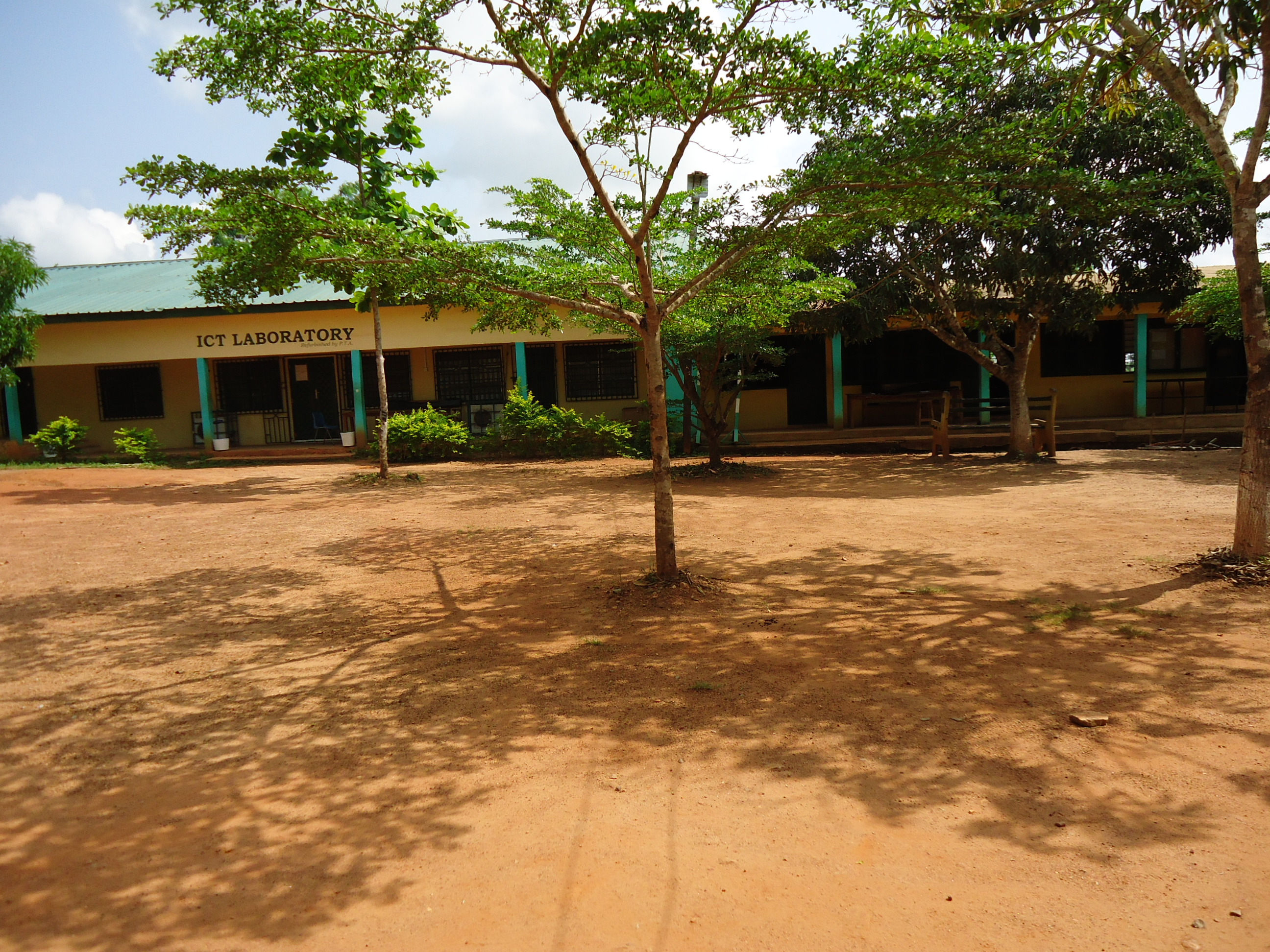
ICT and Science Blocks

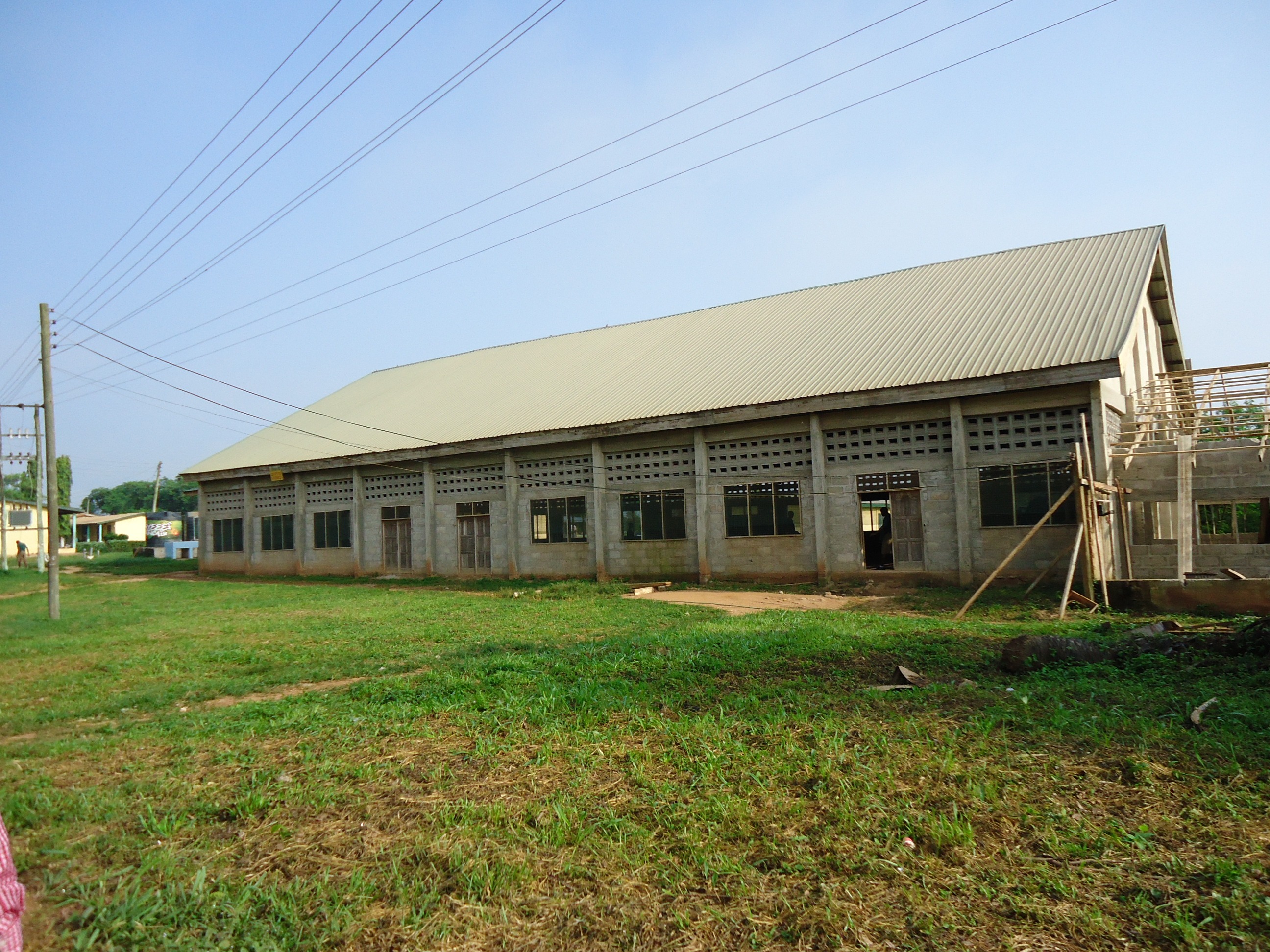
Assembly / Dining Hall (2013)

== Houses ==
- Mfantseman
- Nananom
- Otchere
- Sampson

== Headteachers ==
No.	Tenure of Office	Name	Comment
1.	1991–1995	Mr. W. E. Otchere	Deceased
2.	1995–1999	Nana Adoko	Chief of Ekumfi Mmobroto; Deceased
3.	1999–2004	Mr. J.E. Tachie-Menson	Deceased
4.	2004–2006		
5.	2006–2010		
6.	2010–2013	Mr. Kingsley Kweku Arthur	Retired
7.	2013–2018		
8.	2018–2022	Mr. Noah Nikolai Essuman	
9	2022–present	Mr Alexander Agyemang Duah	

== Achievements and Awards ==
- 1/8th Stage of the National Science & Maths Quiz - 2025
- Winner of the Central Region Zone 3 Schools and Colleges Soccer Championship - 2025
- 2nd Place, SHS & TVET Schools Drill Competition (Central Regional Cadet Corps) - 2025
- Participant, BeLED for Christ Essay and Speech competition, 2024
- Runner-up, Central Region Renewable Energy Challenge - 2021
- Winner, 2nd Inter Zonal Drill Competition (Zone B) of Central Regional Cadet Corps - 2016
