= Paul Mensah =

Ghanaian footballer (born 1999)

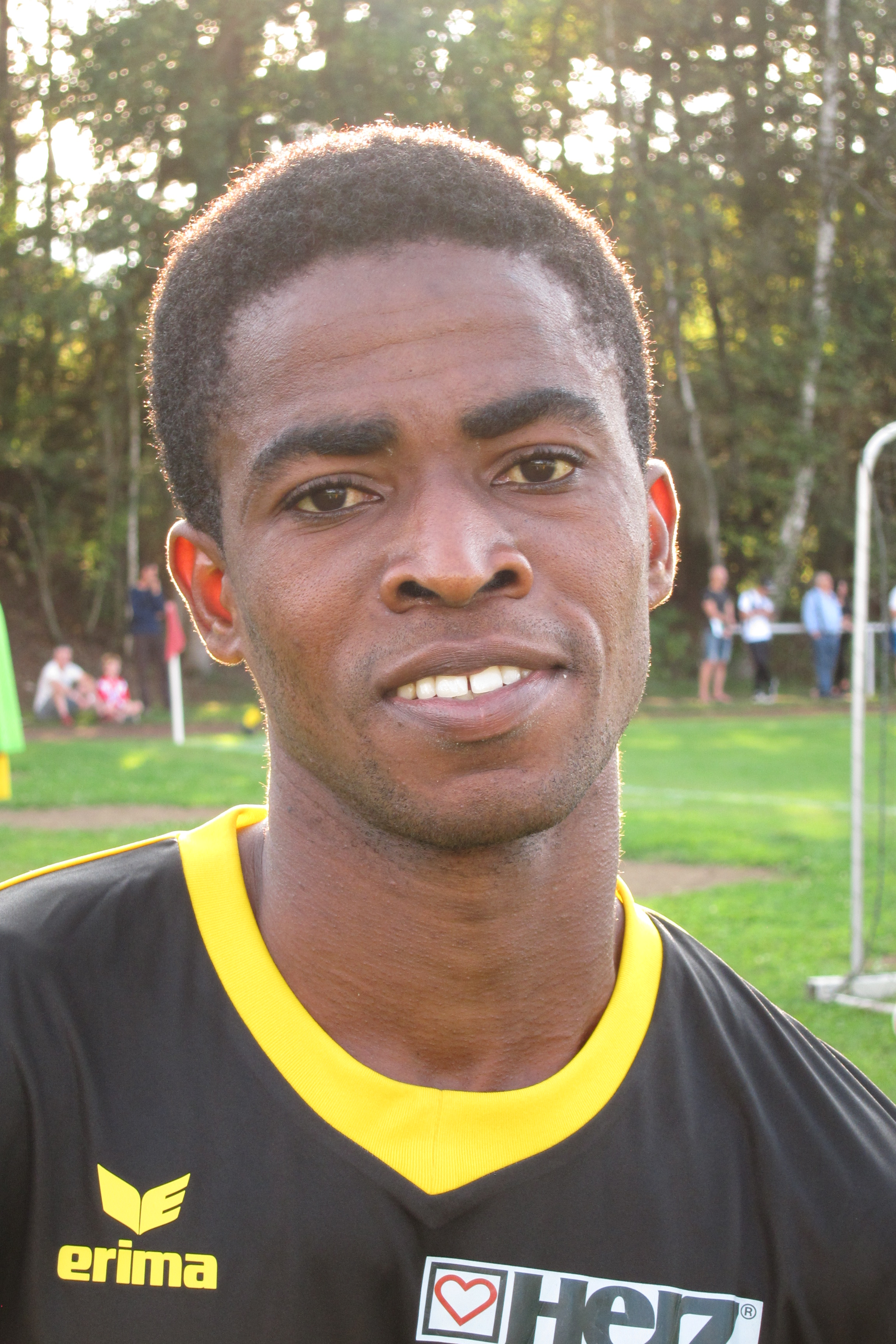
- Mensah with Kapfenberger SV

Personal information
- Date of birth: 13 October 1999 (age 27)
- Place of birth: Kormantse, Ghana
- Height: 1.78 m (5 ft 10 in)
- Position: Forward

Team information
- Current team: Blau-Weiß Linz
- Number: 10

Youth career
- –2018: Krystal Palace

Senior career*
Years	Team	Apps	(Gls)
2018–2021	Kapfenberger SV	73	(16)
2021–2022	Botoșani	1	(0)
2022–	Blau-Weiß Linz	100	(8)
- * Club domestic league appearances and goals as of 10 June 2026

Paul Mensah (born 13 October 1999) is a Ghanaian professional footballer who plays as a forward for Blau-Weiß Linz.
