= Samuel Ofosu-Mensah =

Ghanaian politician

MP for Asante Akim South
- In office 7 January 1993 – 6 January 1997
- President: Jerry John Rawlings
- Preceded by: Sampson Kwaku Boafo
- Succeeded by: Alex Kwaku Korankye

Personal details
- Born: Asante Akim Wenchi, Ashanti Region, Gold Coast (now Ghana)
- Party: National Democratic Congress
- Education: Presbyterian College of Education, Akropong; Kwame Nkrumah University of Science and Technology; University of Massachusetts Amherst; Aberystwyth University
- Occupation: Politician

Samuel Ofosu-Mensah is a Ghanaian politician and a member of the First Parliament of the Fourth Republic representing the Asante-Akim South Constituency in the Ashanti Region of Ghana. He represented the constituency on the ticket of the National Democratic Congress.

== Early life and education ==
Ofosu-Mensah was born in 1935 at Asante-Akim Wenchi in the Ashanti Region of Ghana. He attended the Presbyterian College of Education, Akropong (then the Presbyterian Training College, Akropong) where he obtained his Teachers' Training Certificate (Certificate A), and the Kwame Nkrumah University of Science and Technology (then the University of Science and Technology, Kumasi) where he obtained his GCE Ordinary Level and Advanced Level Certificates in 1953 and 1955 respectively. He later proceeded to the University of Massachusetts Amherst to study a Diploma programme in Tropical Agriculture, after which he was awarded his Diploma Certificate in 1962. He also attended Aberystwyth University (then a constituent college of the University of Wales known as the University of Wales, Aberystwyth), where he was awarded his Master of Science in Agricultural Economics in 1982.

== Politics ==
Ofosu-Mensah was elected into parliament on the ticket of the National Democratic Congress during the December 1992 Ghanaian parliamentary election to represent the Asante Akim South Constituency in the Ashanti Region of Ghana. He lost his seat to his opponent Alex Kwaku Korankye of the New Patriotic Party who polled 18,646 votes out of the total valid votes cast representing 43.00% during the 1996 Ghanaian general election.

== Career ==
Ofosu-Mensah is a businessman and a former member of parliament for the Asante Akim South constituency in the Ashanti Region of Ghana. He served for one term as a parliamentarian for the constituency.

== Personal life ==
He is a Christian.
