= Augustine Arhinful =

Ghanaian footballer

Personal information
- Full name: Augustine Arhinful
- Date of birth: April 4, 1994 (age 32)
- Place of birth: Mankessim, Ghana
- Height: 1.81 m (5 ft 11 in)
- Position: Left-back

Youth career
- 2008–2010: Jennack Professional Club
- 2010–2011: Dunkwa United FC
- 2011–2012: Brighten Stars FC
- 2012–2014: Hasaacas II

Senior career*
Years	Team	Apps	(Gls)
2015–2018	Sekondi Hasaacas F.C.	15	(0)
2018	Bechem United F.C.	1	(0)
2018–2019	Liberty Professionals F.C.	10	(0)
- * Club domestic league appearances and goals as of March 18, 2019

Augustine Arhinful (born April 4, 1994) is a Ghanaian footballer.

== Career ==
Born in Mankessim, Arhinful played early football at Jennack Professional Club between 2008 and 2010, Dunkwa United FC, Brighten Stars FC and Hasaacas II.

Arhinful signed his first professional contract with Sekondi Hasaacas F.C. appearing 15 times for the club in 2015–16 season.

At the end of his contract at Sekondi Hasaacas F.C. he got transferred to Brong Ahafo base team Bechem United F.C. on January 1, 2018.

On May 21, 2018, Arhinful was signed by Liberty Professionals F.C. and was handed number 32.
