= Gifty Ohene-Konadu =

Ghanaian politician

Hon. Gifty Ohene-Konadu
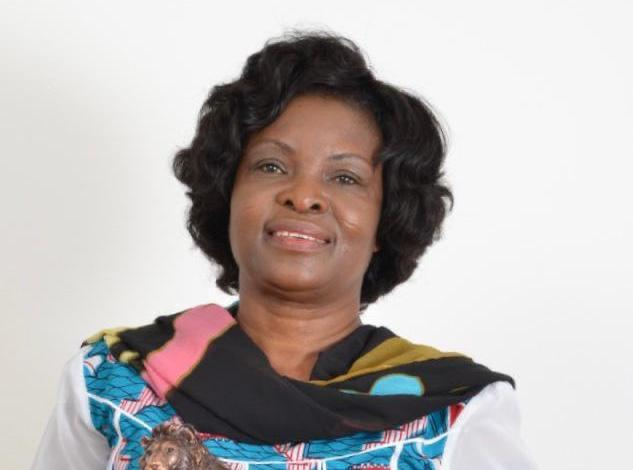
- Hon. Ohene-Konadu in 2023

Member of Parliament for Asante-Akim South Constituency
- In office 7 January 2005 – 6 January 2013
- Preceded by: Alex Kwaku Korankye
- Succeeded by: Kwaku Asante-Boateng

Deputy Minister of Trade and Industry
- In office 7 January 2005 – 31 December 2008
- President: John Kufuor

Personal details
- Born: 23 November 1957 (age 68) Juaso
- Party: New Patriotic Party
- Children: Three
- Education: University of Ghana Kofi Annan International Peacekeeping Training Centre International Institute of Social Studies
- Occupation: Consultant
- Profession: Politician

Gifty Ohene-Konadu (born 23 November 1957) is a civil servant and Ghanaian politician of the Republic of Ghana. She was the Member of Parliament representing Asante-Akim South constituency of the Ashanti Region of Ghana in the 4th and 5th Parliament of the 4th Republic of Ghana. She is a member of the New Patriotic Party. Currently, she holds the position of National Coordinator of the Monitoring and Evaluation Secretariat at the Office of the President.

== Early life and education ==
Gifty was born on 23 November 1957. She hails from Juaso, a town in the Ashanti Region of Ghana. She is a product of the University of Ghana. She holds a degree in Sociology from the university. Gifty also holds a diploma in Home Economics from the same university. She obtained a Master's Degree in Development Studies with specialisation in public policy and administration from the International Institute of Social Studies in the Netherlands. She also acquired a master's degree in Gender, Peace and Security from Kofi Annan International Peacekeeping Training Centre in Accra Ghana.

== Career ==
Gifty has a vast professional background as a consultant, researcher, and civil servant. She gathered her experience while working as a principal project officer for 18 years at National Council for Women and Development (NCWD). Gifty worked with Ministry of Women and Children's Affairs as director of projects for 2 years. Other institutions she worked with include Ministry of Regional Cooperation and NEPAD and the Office of the Head of Civil Service as director of F&A and director of HR respectively. She has international working experience with organizations like the International Union of Local Authorities and the International Organization for Migration. Hon. Gifty was the former Coordinator for the President’s flagship industrialization agenda, One District One Factory during the first term of President Nana Addo Dankwa Akufo-Addo, a position she held from 2017 to 2020. By dint of her hard work and dedication, she was appointed as the National Coordinator of the Monitoring and Evaluation Secretariat at the Office of the President in 2020, a position she still holds.

=== Politics ===
Gifty is a member of the New Patriotic Party. She became a member of parliament from January 2005 after emerging winner in the general election in December 2004. She run for a second term and won in 2008 General Elections. She was the MP for Asante-Akim South constituency. She was elected as the member of parliament for this constituency in the fourth and fifth parliaments of the fourth Republic of Ghana. She was the Deputy Minister of Trade and Industry in charge of Small and Medium Enterprises in the 4th Parliament of the 4th Republic of Ghana.

=== Elections ===
Gifty was elected as the member of parliament for the Asante-Akim South constituency of the Ashanti Region of Ghana for the first time in the 2004 Ghanaian general elections. She won on the ticket of the New Patriotic Party. Her constituency was a part of the 36 parliamentary seats out of 39 seats won by the New Patriotic Party in that election for the Ashanti Region. The New Patriotic Party won a majority total of 128 parliamentary seats out of 230 seats. She was elected with 24,085 votes out of 40,384 total valid votes cast equivalent to 59.6% of total valid votes cast. She was elected over Forkuo De-Graft of the National Democratic Congress, George Agyepong of the Convention People's Party and Andrews Frimpong an independent candidate. These obtained 30.6%, 1.2% and 8.5% respectively of total valid votes cast.

In 2008, she won the general elections on the ticket of the New Patriotic Party for the same constituency. Her constituency was part of the 34 parliamentary seats out of 39 seats won by the New Patriotic Party in that election for the Ashanti Region. The New Patriotic Party won a minority total of 109 parliamentary seats out of 230 seats. She was elected with 23,838 votes out of 38,744 total valid votes cast equivalent to 61.53% of total valid votes cast. She was elected over De-Graft Forkuo of the National Democratic Congress and Quao Ebenezer of the Convention People's Party. These obtained 36.73% and 2.74% respectively of the total votes cast.

== Personal life ==
Gifty is Christian. She fellowships with the Seventh Day Adventist. She is married with three children.

== See also ==
- List of MPs elected in the 2004 Ghanaian parliamentary election
- List of MPs elected in the 2008 Ghanaian parliamentary election
