= Mankessim murder =

In Mankessim, Ghana

The murder of Georgina Asor Botchwey, an aspiring trainee nurse, is alleged to have been carried out by the Tufuhene (Chief) of Ekumfi Akwakrom Christopher Ekow Clark Quansah (known as Nana Clark Onyaa) and a pastor Michael Darko Amponsah (known as Nana 1). The crime was committed at Mankessim in the Central Region of Ghana. The killing came after the victim was allegedly kidnapped by the pastor after she went for an interview at the Ankaful Nursing Training College.

== Background ==
Georgina Asor Botchwey was a 22-year old prospective nurse who traveled from Yeji in the Bono East Region to the Ankaful Psychiatric Nursing Training School to attend an interview for admission. On 8 September 2022, she arrived in Cape Coast and called Michael Darko Amponsah about her mission. On 9 September 2022, the accused persons planned to kill Georgina for money rituals.

== Murder ==
Michael Darko Amponsah, a fiancé of the victim's sister allegedly kidnapped her, demanded GHS15,000 as a ransom from her family, sexually assaulted, murdered and buried her secretly in the kitchen of Nana Clark after the family failed to pay that amount. She was buried in Sikafuambantem a suburb of Mankessim in the Central Region.

== Arrest ==
On 22 September 2022, Nana Clark was arrested in Akwakrom in the Ekumfi District and Michael Darko was also arrested. They were charged with conspiracy to commit murder, to wit murder and murder contrary to section 46 of the Criminal and Offences Acts 1980, Act 29 by the Cape Coast District Court.

== Condemnation ==
Ophelia Mensah Hayford who is the MP for Mfantsiman Constituency condemned the act and called for calm among people in her constituency.

== Aftermath ==
Further investigations by the police led to the establishment of another killing of Gloria Yeboah by the accused persons. On 17 June 2022, they lured her by pretending to help her travel abroad but took her to Mankessim were they murdered and buried her. She was from Obokrom in Kumasi. They also confessed to killing a male who was a teacher, who they shot and killed after they invited him. Also, they allegedly shot and killed a female trader.
