= Nananom Mpow =

Nananom Mpow (also Nananom Pɔw "the grove of the ancestors", Agya Nana "ancestral father", Borbor Agya "Father of the Borbor Fante", Owura Owura Agya "Distinguished Father") is a traditional sacred grove associated with the Fante people in Ghana; according to Rebecca Shumway, "every self-professed Fante is familiar with the name 'Nananom Mpow'". The name is in the Akan language and is believed to refer to Oburumankoma, Odapagyan, and Oson, the legendary founders of Fante settlement on the West African coast. The grove's destruction in 1851 has been described as "one of the best known clashes" between Christianity and traditional religion in the history of the region that would become Ghana.

== Geography ==
Nananom Mpow is half a mile south of Obidan, thought to have been founded in 1840 by Akweesi, who would later become a key Christian opponent of the grove and its customs. It is also near to the Eminsa Ɔkye river and Mankessim.

Nananom Mpow comprised dense and biodiverse woodland, also including two large ponds, Atsendu Pond and Nananom Pond, fed by the watercourses Eminsa Ɔkye and Eguaso.

== History ==
=== Origins ===
The first written evidence for Nananom Mpow is from the eighteenth century, but if, as oral traditions claim, Nananom Mpow originated as the burial place of the founders of the Fante polity on the West African coast, then it must originate before the 1470s, the time of the earliest written sources for the Gold Coast, by which time the Fante polity seems already to have existed. Rebecca Shumway inferred that Nananom Mpow "originated as a sacred grove of trees and brush that remained uncleared for farming. [...] From its origins until the early 1700s, Nananom Mpow was regarded as a sacred place by a relatively small population living within a radius of roughly twenty kilometers of modern-day Mankessim". Until conquest by the Ashante Empire in 1807, the Fante polity was allied with those of other ethnic groups along the central Gold Coast and its hinterland, which tended to have their own ancestral shrines. The administrators (akomfuo) of these shrines seem to have had important political and judicial roles.

=== Eighteenth century ===
Written mentions of Nananom Mpow appear from the mid-eighteenth century; these accounts are by Europeans, with the first being by Ludwig Rømer in the 1740s. By Rømer's time, Nananom Mpow was seen as pre-eminent among the shrines of the mini-kingdoms along the Gold Coast, with its priests charging high prices and therefore serving the regional elite of the Fante Confederacy. Shumway argued that "Nananom Mpow's development from a local shrine [...] to a regional shrine with a regional following, coincided with the shift in Afro-European trade from gold to slaves" around the later seventeenth century. This shift brought a large increase in warfare and demand for a powerful god that could protect Gold Coast polities from Ashante expansion, and Nananom Mpow met this need. As well as serving as a law-court, the shrine contained an oracle thought to express the ancestors' opinion on political decisions, to indicate the future, to receive human and animal sacrifices, and increasingly to serve as a god of war and a guide to handling relations with European colonists. The shrine maintained its popularity after the 1807 conquest of the region by the Ashante Empire partly because the oracle was said to have advised negotiating peace.

=== Nineteenth century ===
The nineteenth-century history of Nananom Mpow is largely known from oral traditions, and to a lesser extent documentary sources, about its destruction, collected around 1952 by the Ghanaian teacher John Brandford Crayner, whose account strongly reflects a Christian and arguably colonial perspective.

By 1840, Nananom Mpow remained influential. Following serial accusations of witchcraft, a successful farmer called Akweesi was identified as a witch by the oracle of Nananom Mpow. Seeking to leave the local communities that rejected him, Akweesi petitioned the chief (ɔdekuro) of Suprudu for land where he could settle alone, and was sold ostensibly unattractive land half a mile north of Nananom Pɔw where he founded the settlement that became Obidan. In 1845, the Methodist missionary Kwesiar Ata, who had been converted to Christianity by John Hayfron, led Obidan's inhabitants to convert to Christianity; Thomas Birch Freeman became a regular preacher in the village.

The Christians' view of Nananom Mpow was that its priests were manipulative charlatans and that there was no supernatural oracle. One Wednesday in August 1851, Akweesi accompanied Kwesiar Ata into Nananom Mpow to retrieve a deer that Kewsiar Ata had been hunting; Akweesi also chopped some timber there. This led Chief Nana Edu of Mankessim, the paramount chief of the Fante, to attack Obidan during their church service one Sunday later that month, arresting Akweesi and many of the Christians, burning down the settlement and its crops, appropriating the inhabitants' possessions, and imprisoning many of the men of Obidan in Mankessim. Other inhabitants of Obidan, including Akweesi's wife, fled to Anomabu Castle, the local seat of the British colonial authorities and the local base for Thomas Freeman's missionising. Learning of the situation, the government police proceeded from Anomabu to Edu's seat at Mankessim, ordering the freeing of the prisoners and fining Edu £18. The prisoners took refuge in Anomabu, partly in the house of John Hayfron, where they were attacked once more. A trial followed, at which the authorities "bound over" Edu "in the sum of £118 to keep the peace". The British authorities protected Akweesi's return to Obidan and equipped him, in Crayner's words, "to go and clear the sacred grove and every place where the practices were done", an activity subsequently endorsed by Nana Edu, who himself converted to Christianity.

By the twenty-first century, Nananom Mpow was seldom visited, though the development of the site for tourism was mooted.
