= Obidan =

- Location in Ghana
- Coordinates: 5°13′N 1°00′W
- Country: Ghana
- Region: Central Region

Obidan is a village in Ghana. As of 2025, Global Brigades gave its population as 452.

== Foundation ==
Oral histories gathered in the 1950s by the Ghanaian historian John Brandford Crayner state that Obidan was founded by Akweesi, later one of the first Ghanaian Methodist ministers. Accused of being a witch, inter alia by the powerful priests of the nearby shrine Nananom Pɔw, and finding himself effectively outlawed from other settlements, Akweesi petitioned the chief (ɔdekuro) of Suprudu for land where he could settle alone on the third week of February 1840. The chief sold him land half a mile north of Nananom Pɔw called Nsebɔ Buw Mu ("the den of tigers"), which was noted as a haunt of tigers and wolves and generally viewed as too dangerous to settle. Akweesi and his family settled there on the third Monday of March and prospered, partly due to ready access to fishing in the Eminsa Ɔkye river and the agricultural opportunities of the surrounding wetlands. Akweesi accrued considerable wealth and came to be joined by many of his extended family. Akweesi renamed the settlement Obi Dan Obi ("a man is dependant") or Obidan in recognition of his former enemies' reliance on his patronage. The people of Obidan converted to Christianity following visits by the Methodist missionary Kwesiar Ata in 1845. Thomas Birch Freeman became a regular preacher in the village. In the 1850s, Akweesi and other inhabitants of Obidan became key players in the destruction of Nananom Pɔw.

== Chiefs of Obidan ==
As of the early 1990s, the following people had been chiefs of Obidan.

1. Akweesi 1840–96
2. Abedu Kuma 1896–1900
3. Kwaw Obuw 1900–10
4. Onyam 1910–44
5. Kwamena Kweenu 1944–58
6. Amo 1958–61
7. Eku Annan 1961–80
8. Esaa 1980–90
9. Okyir 1990–
