= Asafo Flags =

Indigenous flag

The Asafo flags are regimental flags of the Fante people, an ethnic group that mainly reside~~s~~ in Ghana's central coastal region. The flags are influenced by a combination of Akan proverbs, visual imagery, and European heraldic tradition.

== History ==
The Fante people live in the coastal areas of Ghana in the town of Cape Coast that are predominantly fishing communities such as Anomabu, Saltpond, Mankessim, and Elmina. ~~, Ghana~~ ~~in the town of Cape Coast~~~~.~~ Historically, except for Elmina, they have been ~~concerned with~~ fighting against the Ashantis from ~~about~~ the early 18th century onwards~~,~~. The Ashantis were a part of the Akan ethnic group native to the Ashanti Region of modern-day Ghana, due to the Ashantis demanding tribute from them. However, from near the creation of Asafo, there have been various interstate rivalries as a result of the dispersed nature of power, which resulted in infighting within these Fante states, with this continuing until Ghana's creation. The Asafo companies were developed to defend the state as a military group of men in Fante villages. In the local language, Asafo is derived from the words sa meaning 'war', and fo meaning 'people'.

Asafo companies were responsible for sanitation and roadworks, protection of state goods, local policies, conducting funeral rites, and community entertainment. After trading gold, ivory, and slaves with the Europeans, the Asafo companies adapted their flags in order to display designs symbolizing proverbs about security and warfare. The fighting duties of the Asafo companies ended with British colonialization, but they still have their role in the ritual life of Fante villages.

=== Asafo flags ===
In Fante, flags are called frank, and they are a key item of Asafo regalia. A man who wishes to join Asafo society designs a new flag and commissions its production from the local flag maker. The imagery of the flag challenges rival groups as it asserts the wealth and power of the company. The designs are a reflection of the importance of proverbs throughout the Akan culture. A company's flags are usually hung around the Posuban, a concrete shrine for each company that is colourfully decorated with bright figures and serves as a place for regalia and sacrifice. The Asafo flags are traditionally handmade cotton material in the use of "appliqué", embroidery, and patchwork (sewings). The designs are usually. sewn onto both sides of the materials for vivid imagery in decor and wordings. The consistency use of visuals for sharks, birds, leopards, elephants, and even clocks derive from their historical contact with Europeans. The Ghanaian flags retain intricately simple geometric and (earthy) neutral toned colors in their very artistic gestures. The flags embody derived arts and culture from neighboring cultures of the Akan. The flags are carried on a procession through the village, and are used at annual festivals, funerals for company members, and other occasions.

==== Examples ====
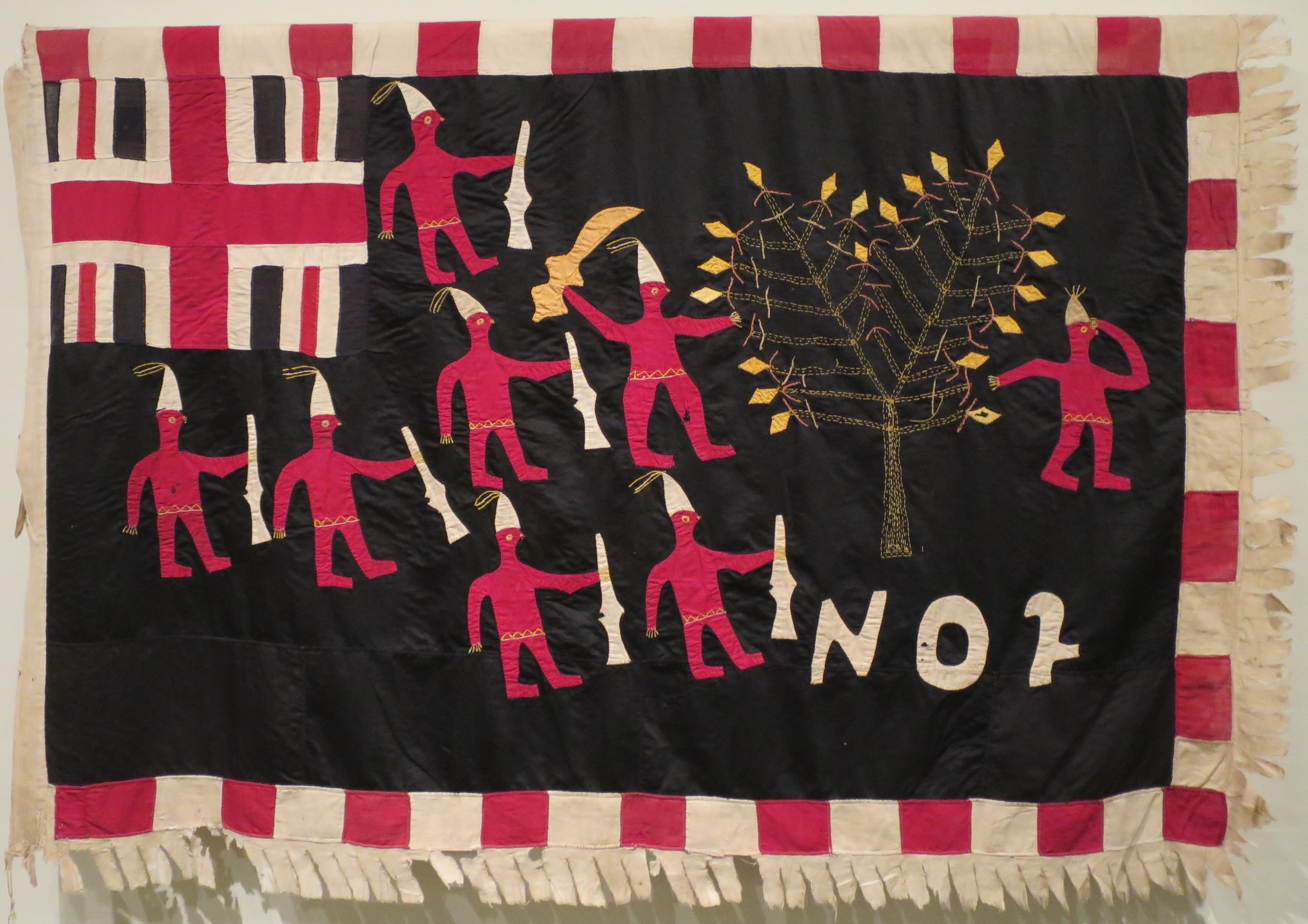

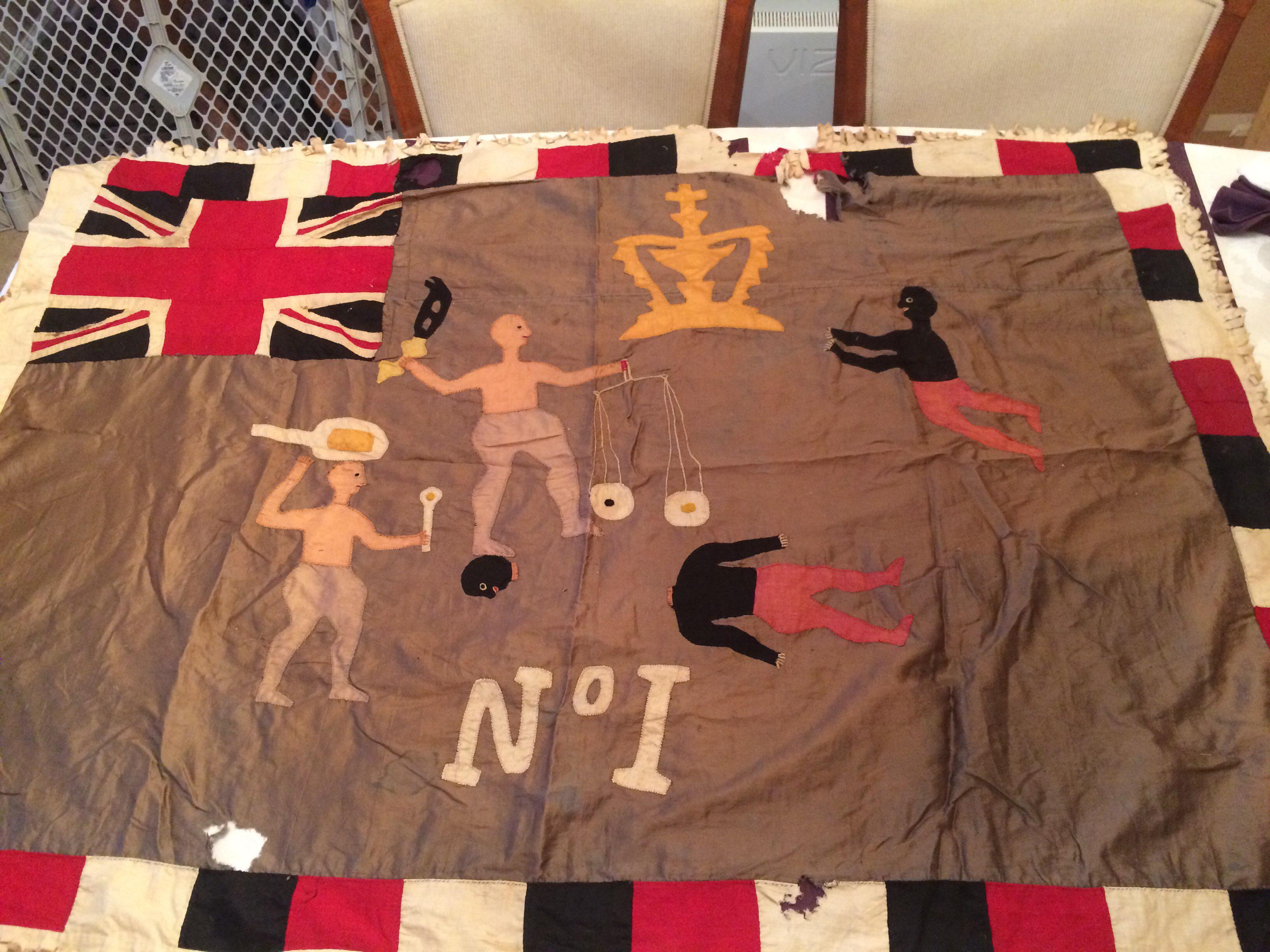

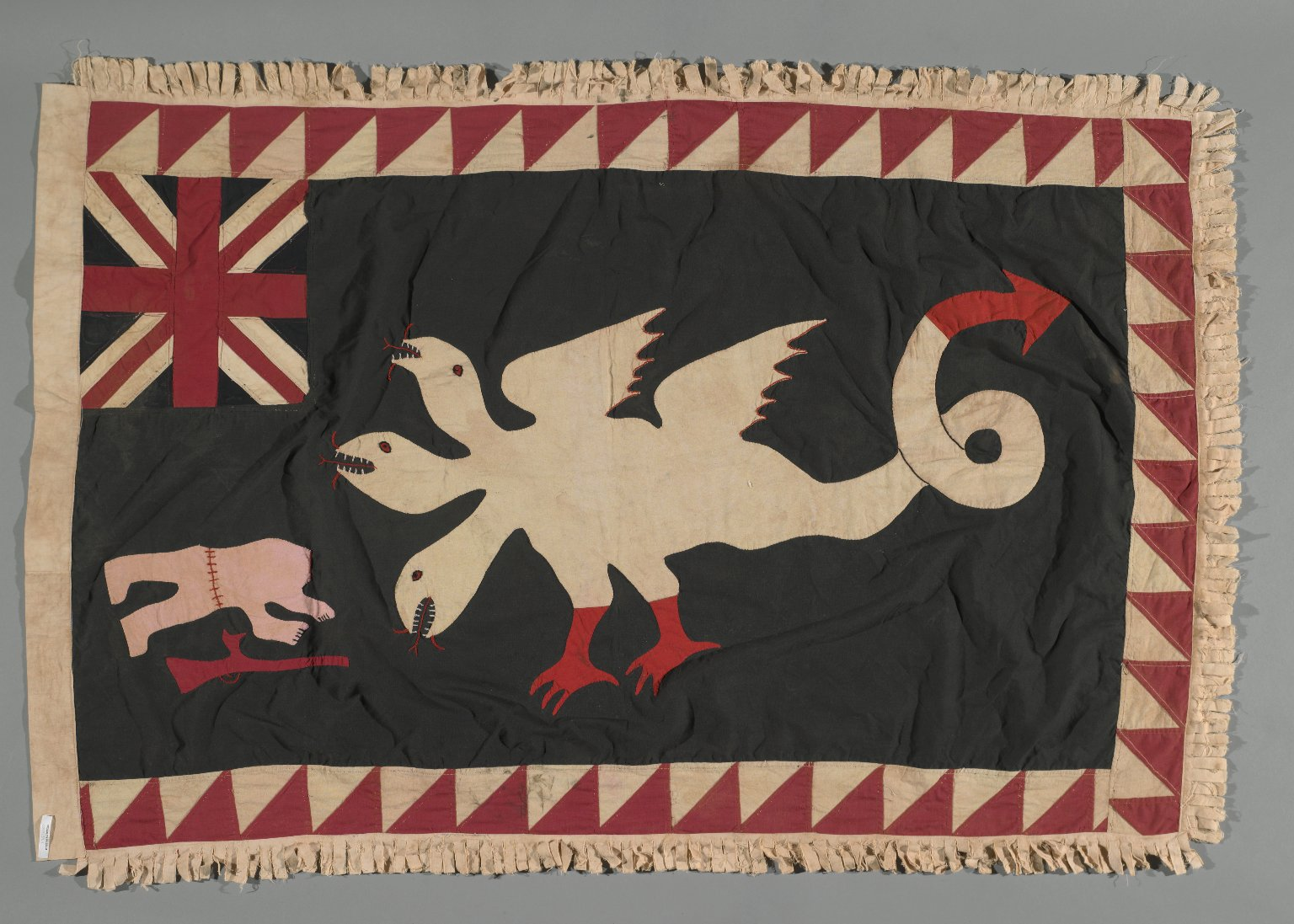

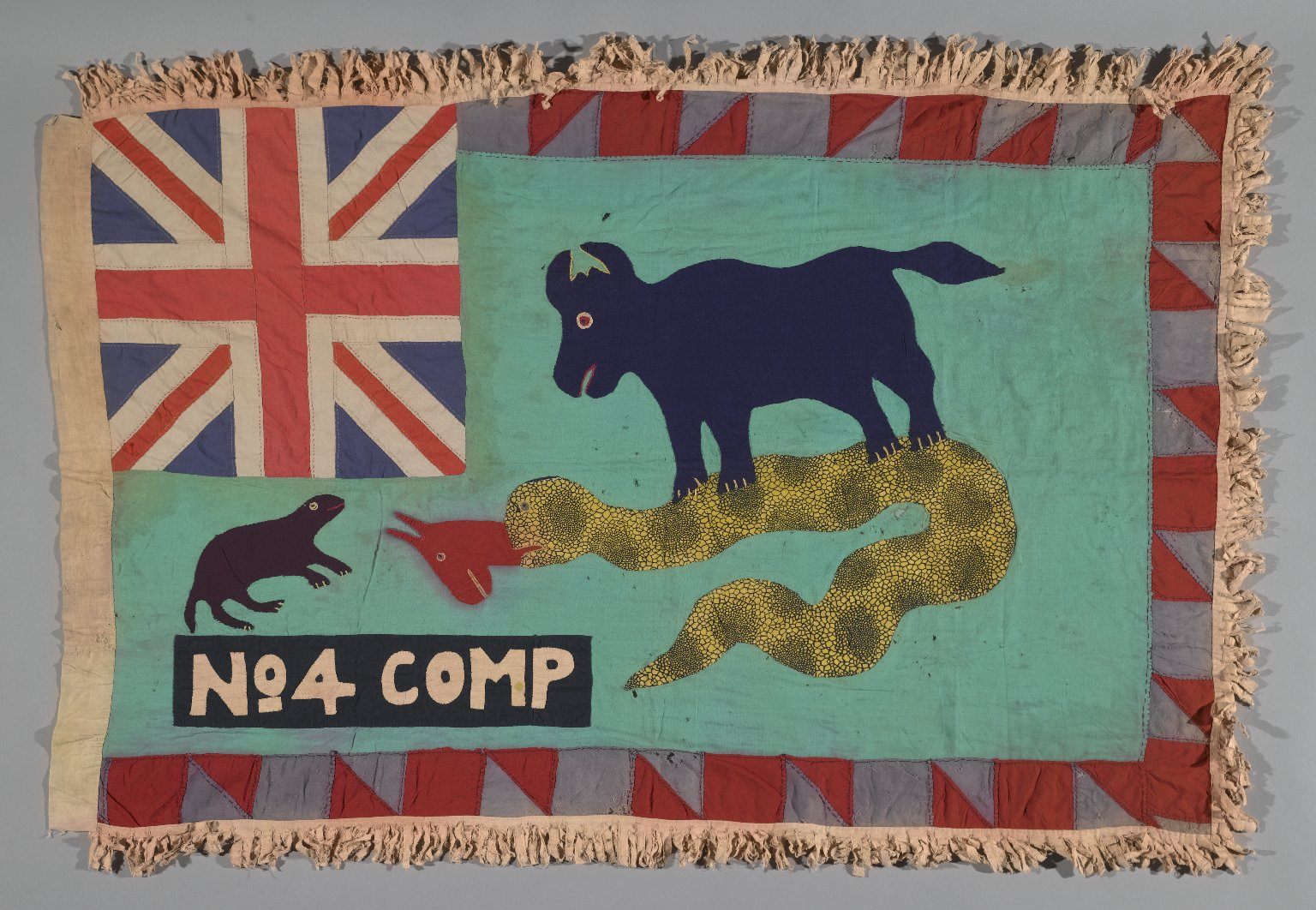

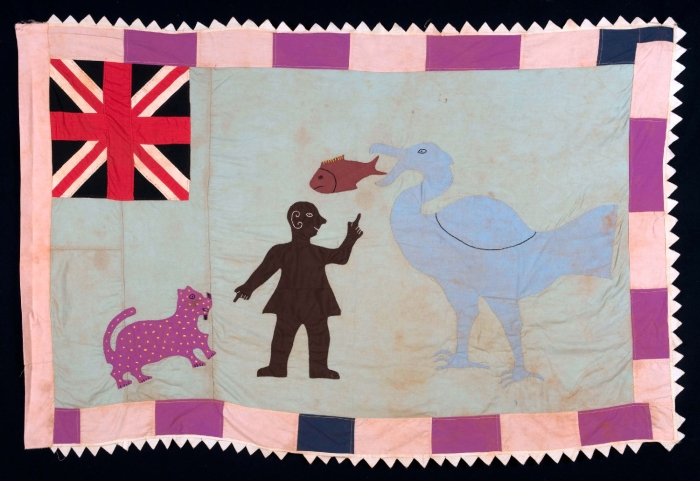

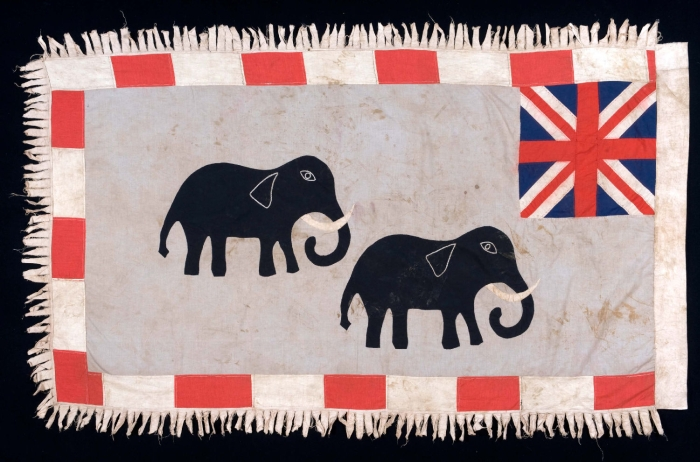

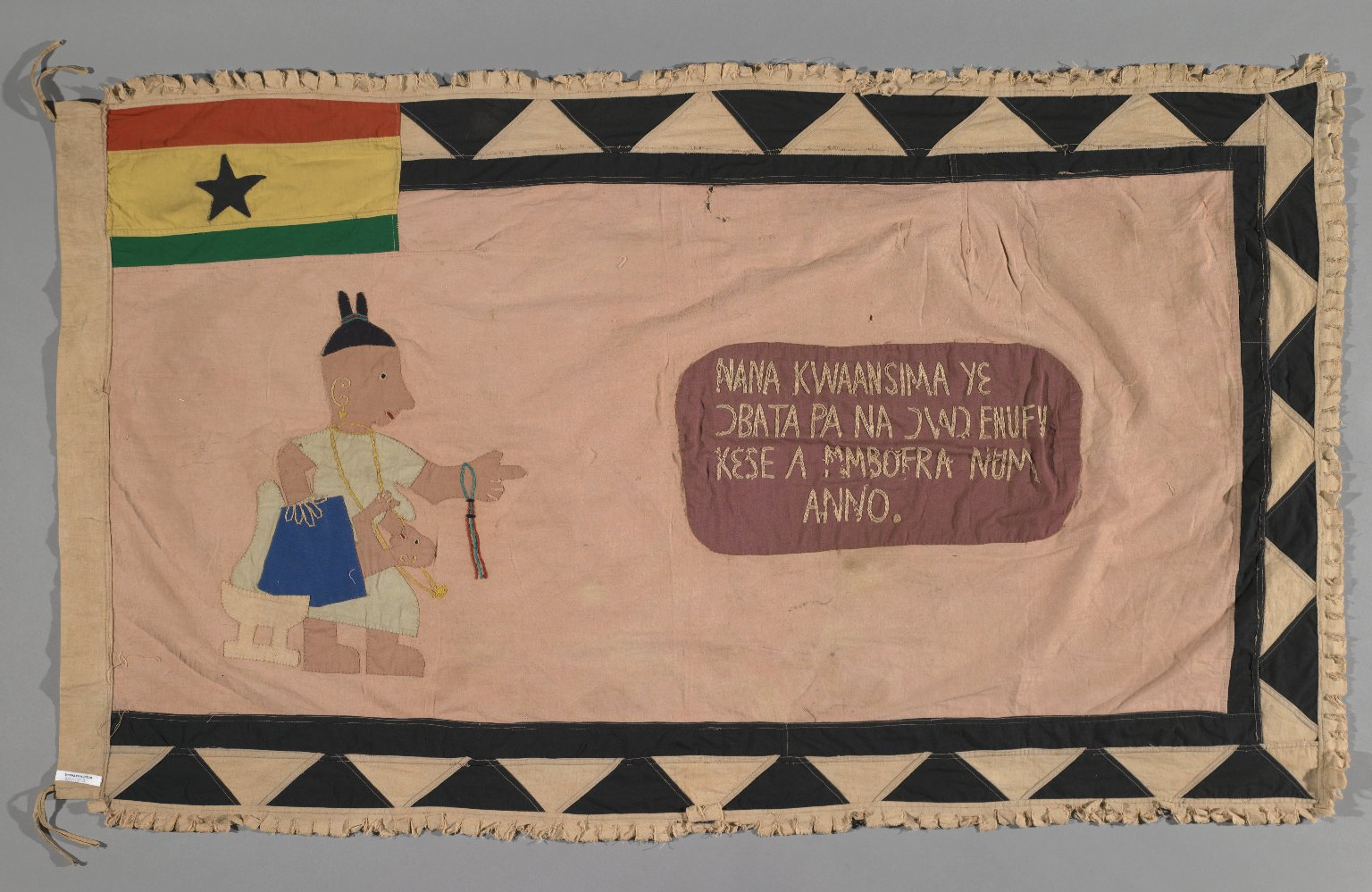

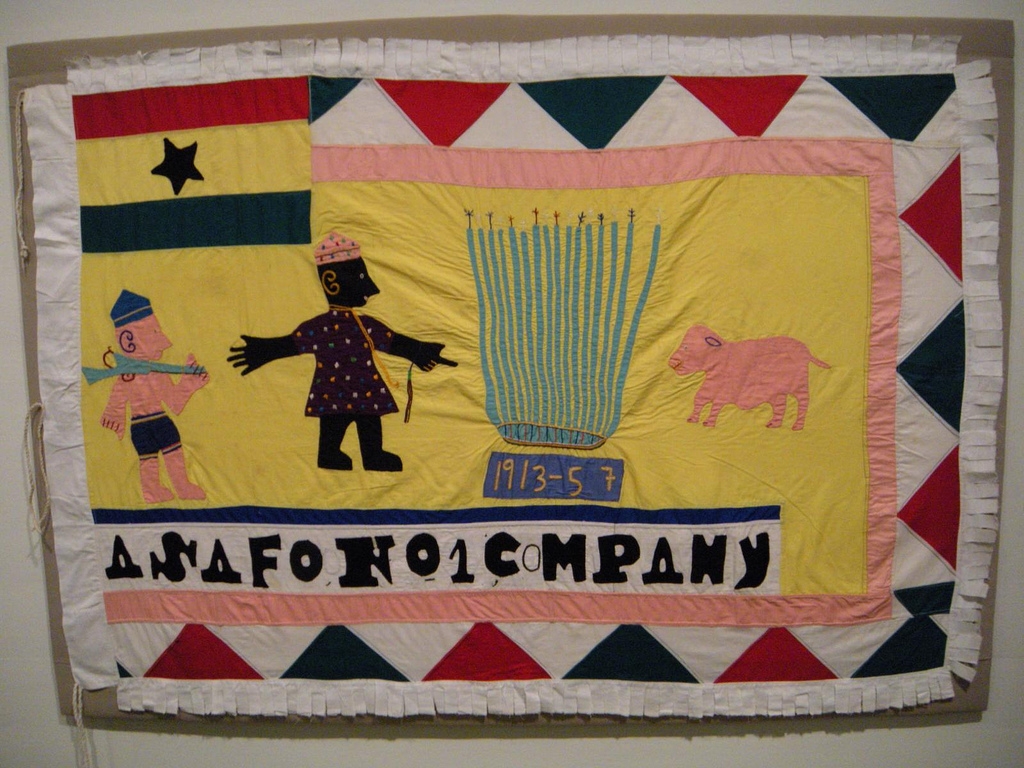

== Significance ==
Asafo flags are still being made and used as an important part of communal life in Fante villages. The flags have been highly collectible in countries and regions outside Ghana since the 1990s for their striking imagery.
