= Samuel Atta Mensah =

Ghanaian footballer (born 1999)

Personal information
- Date of birth: 10 December 1999 (age 26)
- Place of birth: Tema, Ghana
- Position: Striker

Team information
- Current team: Club Atlético Colón

Senior career*
Years	Team	Apps	(Gls)
2015–2016	Dunkwa United	28	(12)
2016–	All Stars F.C.	12	(4)
- * Club domestic league appearances and goals as of 13 December 2016

Samuel Atta Mensah (born 10 December 1999) is a Ghanaian footballer who plays as a striker for First Capital Plus Premier League side All Stars F.C. He was named among the 60 best young talents in world football by British daily The Guardian.

== Career ==
He started off his career for Ghanaian Division One League team Dunkwa United. He topped the assist charts for the second division by setting up 17 goals in the season. He also scored 12 goals for the team. His performances earned him a move to First Capital Plus Premier League side All Stars F.C. He has been called the Ghanaian Luka Modrić by the Ghanaian press based on his passing game. He made his debut for the All Stars against Asante Kotoko He scored 4 goals and made 7 assists in 12 games to lead the All Stars to their first Ghana Premier League title in 2016. He was one of the African players who made it to the list of 60 best young talents in world football in 2016 by The Guardian.
