= Kormantse =

- Location within Ghana
- Coordinates: 05°12′N 01°04′W
- Country: Ghana
- Region: Central Region
- District: Mfantsiman Municipal District

Population (2010)
  - Total: 8,501

Kormantse is a settlement in Mfantsiman Municipal District, Central Region, Ghana. Kormantse is located along the coast, close to the site of the Fort Amsterdam, a major historic slave fort. Fishing is a major economic activity in the settlement.

== History ==
The settlement is near Fort Amsterdam, a major slave fort built by the English, and later occupied by the Dutch. Due to the original location of the fort being adjacent to Kormantse, many who passed through the fort were referred to as "Kormantse". The area became a major regional trading center for the coastal kingdoms of Eguafo, Asebu, and Efutu, as well as various chiefdoms away from the coast.

== Geography ==
Kormantse is located along the coast, and is the site of numerous lagoons.

== Demographics ==
As of the 2010 Ghanaian census, Kormantse has a population of 8,501. Kormantse has 4,002 males and 4,499 females, comprising 2,161 households who reside in 1,094 houses. 3,334 people are under the age of 15, 4,498 people are between the ages of 15 and 64, and 669 people are age 65 and older.

Kormantse is predominantly Fante.

== Economy ==
Fishing is a major economic activity in Kormantse.

== Culture ==
Kormantse is a major regional center in the production of Asafo Flags.

== See also ==
- Abandze
- Asafo Flags
- Atlantic slave trade
- Central Region
- Coromantee
- Fante people
- Fort Amsterdam
- Mfantsiman Municipal District
