= Kwaku Asante-Boateng =

Ghanaian politician

Hon. Kwaku Asante-Boateng
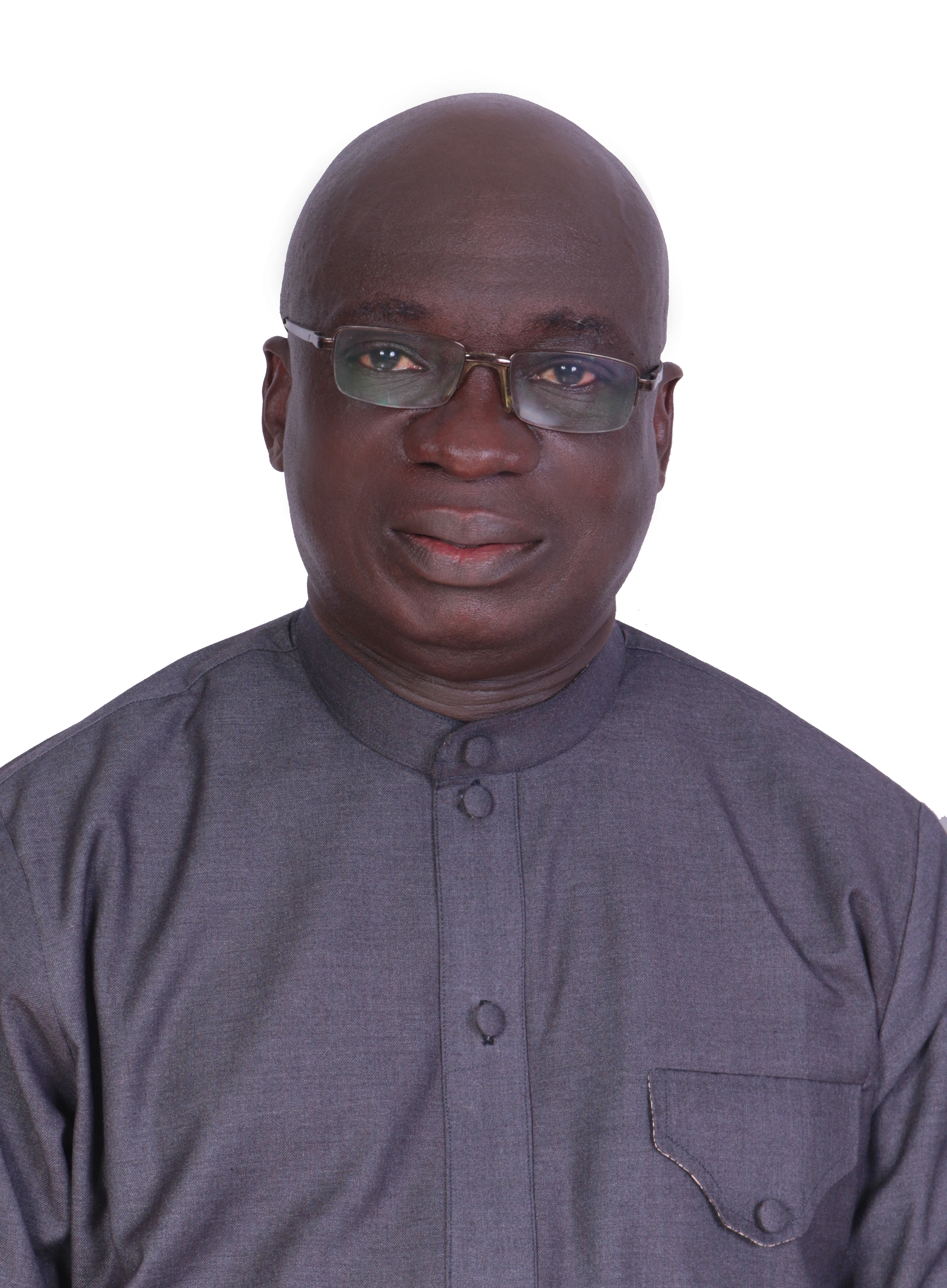

Member of Parliament for Asante-Akim South
- Incumbent
- Assumed office 7 January 2021

Personal details
- Born: Kwaku Asante-Boateng; 27 April 1961 (age 65) Bompata, Ghana
- Party: New Patriotic Party
- Occupation: Politician
- Profession: Lawyer
- Committees: Subsidiary Legislation Committee; Government Assurance Committee; Employment, Social Welfare and State Enterprises Committee

Kwaku Asante-Boateng (born 27 April 1961) is a Ghanaian politician and member of the Seventh Parliament of the Fourth Republic of Ghana and the 8th Parliament of the Fourth Republic, representing the Asante-Akim South Constituency in the Ashanti Region on the ticket of the New Patriotic Party.

== Early life and education ==
Asante-Boateng was born on 27 April 1961 in Bompata, Asante Akim of Ghana. Asante-Boateng earned a Bachelor of Science degree in land economy at Kwame Nkrumah University of Science and Technology. He also earned a certificate in project planning and management at GIMPA. He obtained his MBA at University of Ghana, Legon. He became a barrister at law at the Ghana School of Law. He earned a diploma in Licensed Surveyor at Ghana institute of survey.

== Career ==
Asante-Boateng was a lawyer and CEO of Property Solution Models and Real Concepts R. Limited both in Accra. He was the assistant valuer at the land valuation division from 1989 to 1991. He became EST officer to the assistant manager of State Insurance Company of Ghana from 1991 to 2000. He was projects and estate manager at Unilever Ghana Limited from 2000 to 2004. He became the chief executive officer of a private real estate company in 2004. He has over the years provided a vast range of Real Estate , Development and Investment Consultancy Services to Corporate Entities and Individuals locally and internationally.

== Political life ==
Asante-Boateng was a majority member of the 6th parliament of the 4th republic of Ghana. He was selected to join the work and housing committee as vice chairperson and join the subsidiary legislation committee. He is a member of the NPP and a member of parliament for the Asante Akim South Constituency. He won the parliamentary seat with 33,223 votes making 60.6% of the total votes cast whilst the NDC parliamentary candidate had 21,639 votes making 39.4% of the total votes cast. Currently, he is the Deputy Minister for Railway Development.

=== Committees ===
Asante-Boateng is a member of the Subsidiary Legislation Committee, a member of the Government Assurance Committee, and a member of the Employment, Social Welfare and State Enterprises Committee.

== Personal life ==
Kwaku Asante-Boateng is a Christian and attends Assemblies of God. He is married with four children.
