= Mfantsiman Municipal District =

Mfantseman Municipal Assembly
- Municipal District
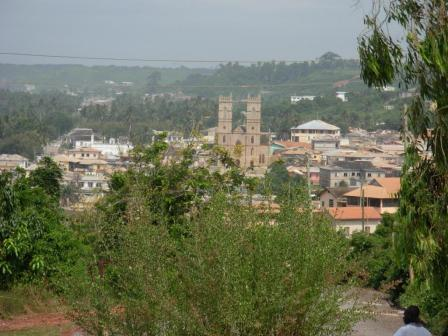
- Saltpond (town centre)

- Districts of Central Region

- Location of Mfantseman Municipal Assembly within Central
- Coordinates: 5°12′11.16″N 1°3′25.2″W
- Country: Ghana
- Region: Central
- Capital: Saltpond

Government
  - Municipal Chief Executive: Eric Stanley Acquah

Area
  - Total: 533 km^{2} (206 sq mi)

Population (2021)
  - Total: 168,905
- Time zone: UTC+0 (GMT)
- ISO 3166 code: GH-CP-MF
- Website: Official Website

Mfantseman Municipal Assembly is one of the twenty-two districts in Central Region, Ghana. Originally created as an ordinary district assembly in 1988 when it was known as Mfantseman District, which was created from the former Mfantseman District Council; until it was later elevated to municipal district assembly status on 29 February 2008 to become Mfantseman Municipal District. However, on 28 June 2012, the eastern part of the district was split off to create Ekumfi District; thus, the remaining part has been retained as the Mfantseman Municipal Assembly. The municipality is located in the southwest part of Central Region and has Saltpond as its capital town.

== Geography ==
The Mfantseman municipality is located along the Atlantic coastline of the Central Region of Ghana and extends from latitudes 5° to 5°20’ north of the equator and longitudes 0°44’ to 1°11’ west of the Greenwich Meridian, stretching for about 21 kilometers along the coastline and for about 13 kilometers inland and constituting an area of 612 square kilometers. The municipal capital is Saltpond.

The municipality is bounded to the west and northwest by Abura-Asebu-Kwamankese District, to the east by Ekumfi District and to the south by the Atlantic Ocean. The District as of 2012 stretched from Mankessim to Yamoransa.

== Economy ==
The inhabitants are mainly employed through fishing, farming or trading. The capital Saltpond was the birthplace of Convention People's Party (CPP), The founders use to stay in a house named Caanan Lodge, the party of Osagyefo Dr Kwame Nkrumah. Kwame Nkrumah planted a palm tree that signified the birth of UGCC in the town. The palm tree is found in the centre of Saltpond. The first tarred road in Ghana is also found in Saltpond.

The municipality houses the Akanland Ceramics factory (formerly) but now a paper producing company and also known to be the first place to begin off-shore oil-drilling in Ghana.

== List of settlements ==
Settlements of Mfantsiman Municipal Assembly
No.	Settlement	Population	Population year
1	Abonko	1,538	2010
2	Anomabo	13,401	2010
3	Baifikrom	3,705	2010
4	Biriwa	7,086	2010
5	Ankaful		
6	Kormantse	8,501	2010
7	Egya No. 1,2 & 3		
8	Dominase		
9	Asafora	1,127	2010
10	Nsanful	960	2010
11	Kyeakor	2,491	2010
12	Kuntu		
13	Mankessim	38,313	2010
14	Taido		
15	Saltpond	24,132	2012
16	Aminsakrom		
17	Yamoransa	6,816	2010
18	Eguase	1,025	2010
19	Akatakyiwa		
20	Oguakuma		
21	Akoanso		
22	Kobina Ansah		
23	Egyirfa		
24	Waakrom		
25	Akroful		
26	Amoanukumah		
27	Akraman		
28	Nsanfokuma		
29	Fomena/Begyin		
30	Edzimbor		
31	Ekutukrom		
32	Nkwantakesedo		
33	Mampong		
34	Brofoyedur		
35	Tayido		
36	Pomadze		
37	Ekurabadze		
38	Oboadze		
39	Anomansa		
40	Abandze	3,632	2010
41	Ewoyaa		
42	Hiini		
43	Pebi		
44	Eshiro		
45	Krofu	1,321	2010
46	Nkwanta		
47	Effutuakwa		
48	Opim		
49	Duadze		
50	Towoboase		
51	Edumanu		
52	Kwesi Ansah		
53	Mprenkyi		
54	Akropong		
55	Kwaakrom		
56	Essamutan		
57	Odumano		
58	Kyekyewere		
59	Taabosom		
60	Kaawonsere	1,265	2010
61	Akobima		

== Past members of parliament ==
- Mr. Abakah-Quansah: 1992–1996
- Mr. Jacob Arthur: 1996–2000, 2000–2004
- Mr. Stephen Asamoah Boateng: 2004–2008
- Mr. Aquainas Tawiah Quansah: 2008–2012, 2012–2016
- Mr. Ekow Kwansah Hayford: 2016-2020
- Ophelia Mensah: 2017 - 2024
- EBENEZER PRINCE ARHIN: 2024 -

== Notable people ==
Some important people who hail from Mfantsiman Municipality are:

- Prof. Francis K. A. Allotey
- Prof. Paul Archibald Vianey Ansah
- Prof. William Otoo Ellis- Vice Chancellor, Kwame Nkrumah University of Science and Technology (KNUST), Ghana
- Prof. Kwesi Andam – Former Vice Chancellor, KNUST, Ghana (He was an indigene until Ekumfi District was carved out of Mfantsiman Municipality)
- King Peggy
- Dr. James Kwegyir Aggrey
- John Mensah Sarbah
- Kobina Arku Korsah (Sir Arku Korsah)
- Ama Ata Aidoo
- William Ansah Sessarakoo
- George Ekem Ferguson
- K. B. Anann
- Isaac Dadzie Honny
- Lawyer Kweku Yamoah Painstil
- Mr. Isaac Kwegyir Essel(Proprietor- Sabs Smerbu Memorial JHS)
- CSOP Prince Essel- Nana Osreko Yamoah Ponko I (Akwamuhene of Mankessim Traditional Area)
- Mrs Agnes Ama Bentsiwaa Botchway
- Daasebre Kwebu Ewusi VII (Omanhene of Abeadze Traditional Area)
- Mr. Hariom Ewusie Anan (Proprietor – Hariom International School)

== Sources ==
- "Mfantsiman Municipal District". Statoids.
- District: Mfantsiman Municipal District
