= Asante-Akim South (Ghana parliament constituency) =

Constituency in the Ashanti Region of Ghana

- constituency for the Parliament of Ghana
- District: Asante Akim South District
- Region: Ashanti Region of Ghana

Current constituency
- Party: New Patriotic Party
- MP: Hon. Kwaku Asante-Boateng

Asante-Akim South is one of the constituencies represented in the Parliament of Ghana. It elects one Member of Parliament (MP) by the first past the post system of election. Asante-Akim South is located in the Asante Akim South district of the Ashanti Region of Ghana.

== Boundaries ==
The seat is located within the Asante Akim South District of the Ashanti Region of Ghana.

== Members of Parliament ==
Election	Member	Party
1992	Samuel Ofosu-Mensah	National Democratic Congress
1996	Alex Kwaku Korankye	New Patriotic Party
2000	Alex Kwaku Korankye	New Patriotic Party
2004	Gifty Ohene Konadu	New Patriotic Party
2008	Gifty Ohene Konadu	New Patriotic Party
2012	Kwaku Asante-Boateng	New Patriotic Party

== Elections ==
2008 Ghanaian parliamentary election: Asante-Akim South Source: Ghana Home Page
Party	Candidate	Votes	%	±%
New Patriotic Party	Mrs Gifty Ohene Konadu	23,838	61.5	
National Democratic Congress	De-Graft Forkuo	13,843	35.7	
Convention People's Party	Ebenezer Quao	1,063	2.7	
Majority		9,995	25.8	

== See also ==
- List of Ghana Parliament constituencies
