= Amisa River =

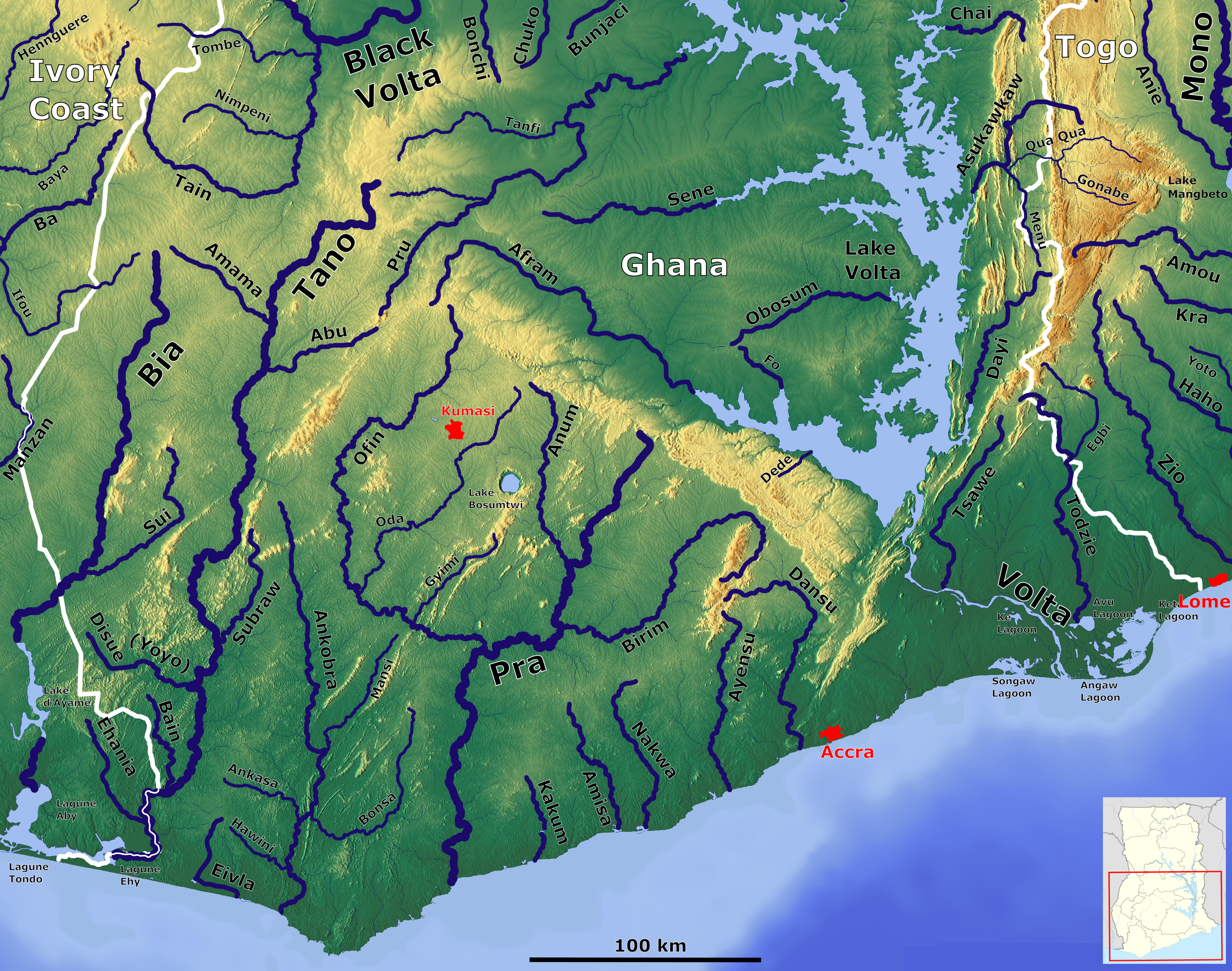
- Rivers of South Ghana, showing the Amisa River

Location
- Countries: Ghana

Physical characteristics
- Mouth: Gulf of Guinea
  - location: Atlantic Ocean
  - coordinates: 5°12′23.4″N 1°00′36″W
- Basin size: 15,576 km^{2} (6,014 sq mi)
- Discharge
  - average: 12.8m³ per second.

Amisa River (also known as Ochi Amisa, Okyi-Amisa, Eminsa Ɔkye, and Eminsa Okye) rises in and runs through the Central Region of Ghana, through Mankessim, discharging into Amisa Lagoon and thereafter the Gulf of Guinea just to the south of Suprudu, near Saltpond.

== Geography ==
The Amisa's basin is 15,576km²; as of 2007, the basin had a relatively low population density compared with neighbouring river systems, at 150 inhabitants per square kilometre. Its drainage area is 1368km² and in 1998 its mean annual discharge was estimated at 12.8m³ per second. The river is characterised by "extensive wetlands" and a "wide inlet" from the sea.

== Economics ==
The river is one of nine key sources of potable water in the Central Region, with its water supply production system located at Baifikrom Headworks. It is also important to agricultural irrigation, while its 2.1km² lagoon is associated with salt production and fishing.

== Culture ==
The river feeds one of two large ponds at the traditional sacred grove of Nananom Pow, Atsendu Pond.
