= Alex Kwaku Korankye =

Ghanaian politician

Hon. Alex Kwaku Korankye

Member of Parliament for Asante Akim South Constituency
- In office 7 January 1996 – 6 January 2005
- Preceded by: Samuel Ofosu-Mensah
- Succeeded by: Gifty Ohene-Konadu

Personal details
- Party: New Patriotic Party

Alex Kwaku Korankye is a Ghanaian politician. He served as a member of parliament for the Asante Akim South constituency in the Ashanti Region of Ghana.

== Early life and career ==
Alex Kwaku Korankye served on the ticket of the New Patriotic Party as the 3rd parliament of the 4th Republic of Ghana. He took his seat during the 2000 Ghanaian general election with a majority of 5,306 votes. He lost the seat in 2004 to Gifty Ohene Konadu of the New Patriotic Party.

== Elections ==
Korankye was first elected into Parliament on the ticket of the New Patriotic Party during the December 1996 Ghanaian General Elections for the Asante Akim South Constituency in the Ashanti Region of Ghana. He polled 18,646 votes out of the 35,918 valid votes cast representing 43.00%.

In the year 2000, Korankye won the general elections as the member of parliament for the Asante Akim South constituency of the Ashanti Region of Ghana. He won on the ticket of the New Patriotic Party. His constituency was a part of the 31 parliamentary seats out of 33 seats won by the New Patriotic Party in that election for the Ashanti Region. The New Patriotic Party won a majority total of 99 parliamentary seats out of 200 seats. He was elected with 19,198 votes out of 33,986 total valid votes cast. This was equivalent to 57.1% of the total valid votes cast. He was elected over Kwaku Kyeremanteng of the National Democratic Congress, Jonathan Owusu of the Convention People's Party, Emmanuel A. bOadi of the People's National Convention and Amponsah Wireko of the New Reformed Party. These won 13,892, 257, 172 and 117 votes out of the total valid votes cast respectively. These were equivalent to 41.3%, 0.8%, 0.5% and 0.3% respectively of total valid votes cast.
