= Asafo =

Warrior groups in Fante culture

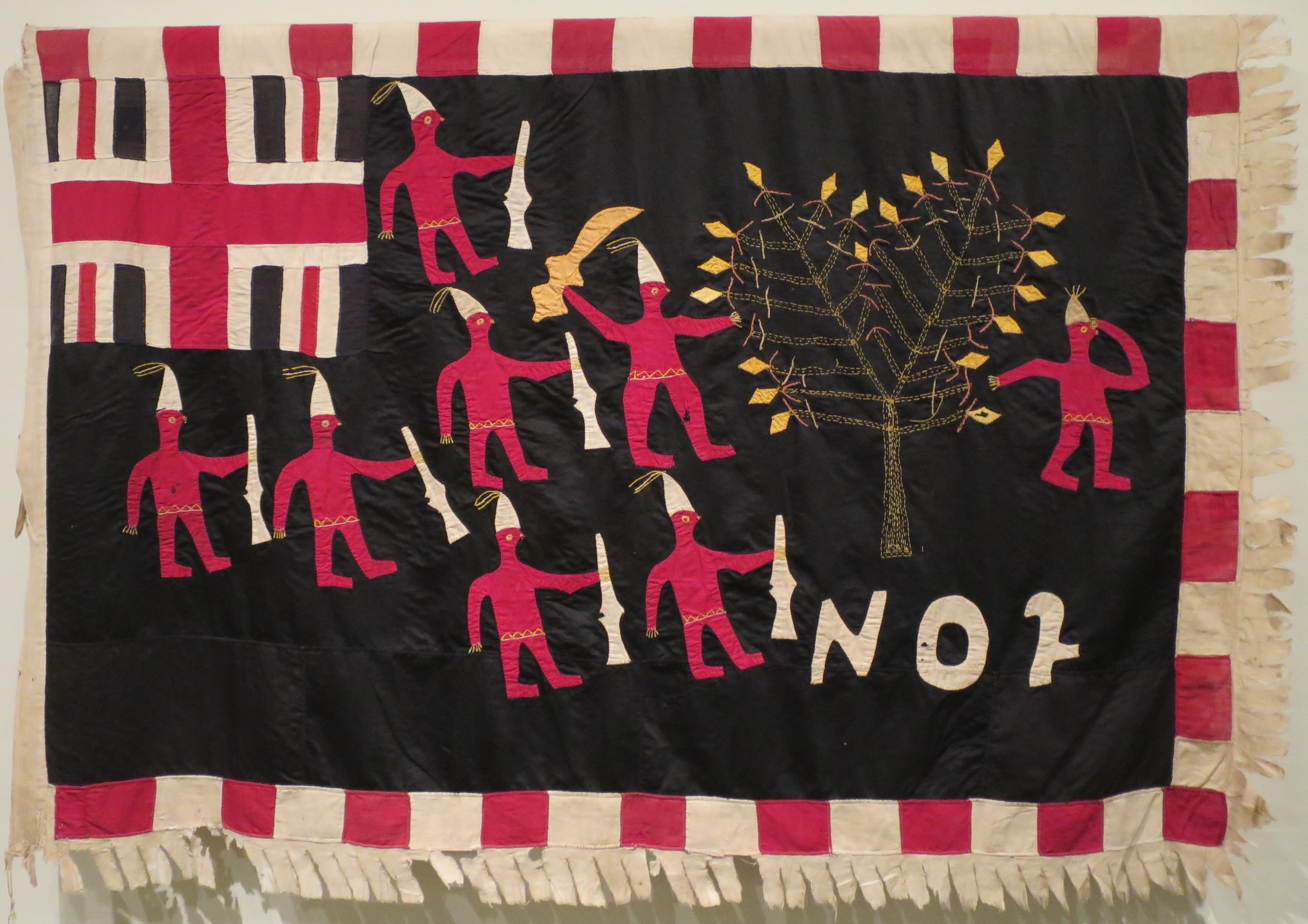
Asafo flag, No. 2 Company; created by Akwa Osei, Ghana, Fante people; c. 1900, Cotton and rayon, embroidery and appliqué

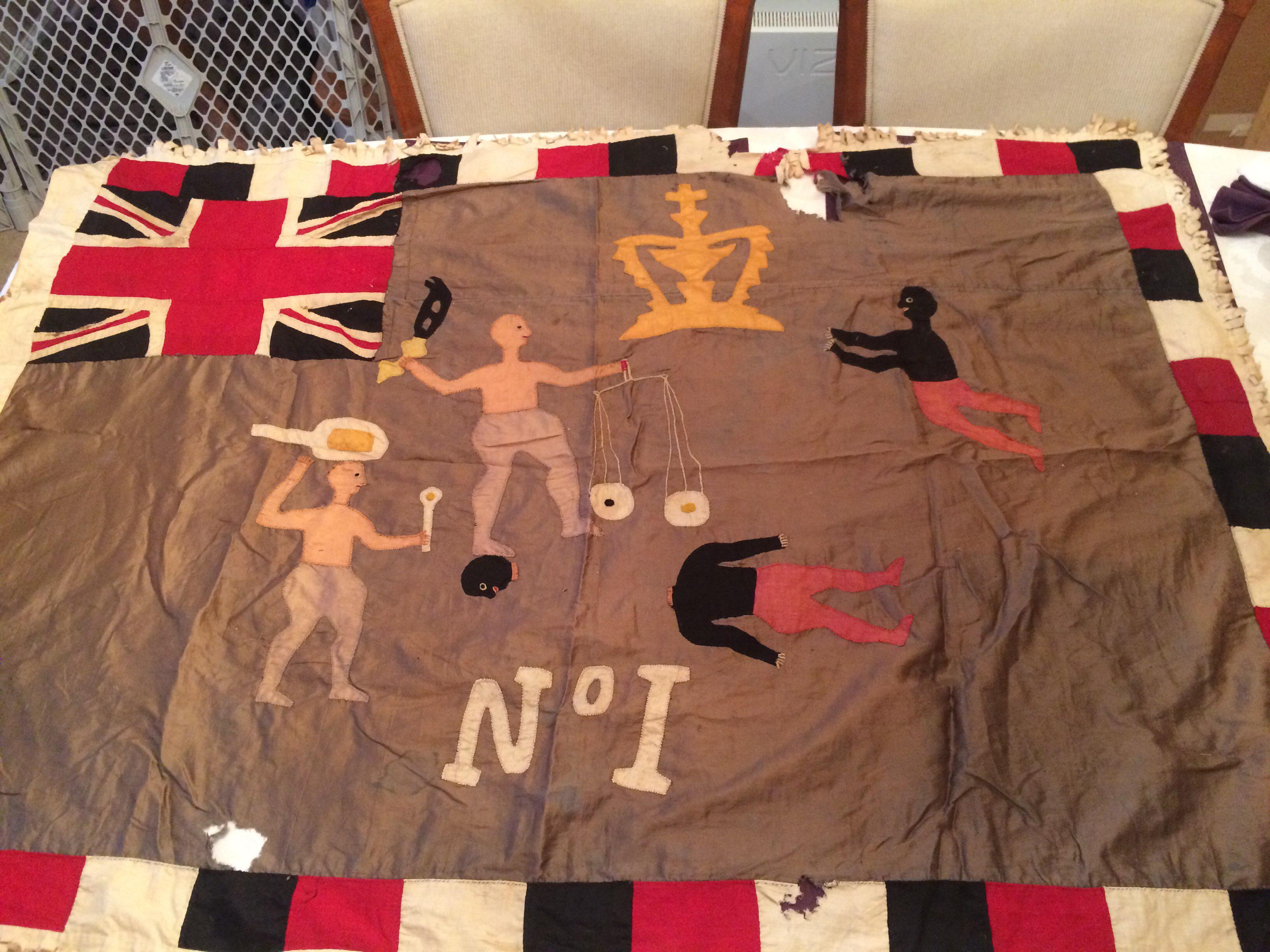
Asafo flag, No. 1 Company

Asafo are traditional warrior groups in Akan culture, based on lineal descent. The word derives from sa, meaning war, and fo, meaning people. The traditional role of the Asafo companies was defence of the state. As the result of contact with European colonial powers on the Gold Coast (present-day Ghana), the Fante, who inhabit the coastal region, developed an especially complex version of the concept in terms of its social and political organization based on martial principles, and with elaborate traditions of visual art, including flag banners with figurative scenes, and designs alluding to historical events or proverbs.

Posuban shrines (the name derived from a corrupted form of the word "post" combined with the word "ban", signifying a fortification) are traditional structures usually made of concrete, intricately designed and painted with bright colours, serving as both military and religious posts for Asafo groups, as well as meeting grounds.

== Asafo societies on the Gold Coast ==
=== Elmina ===
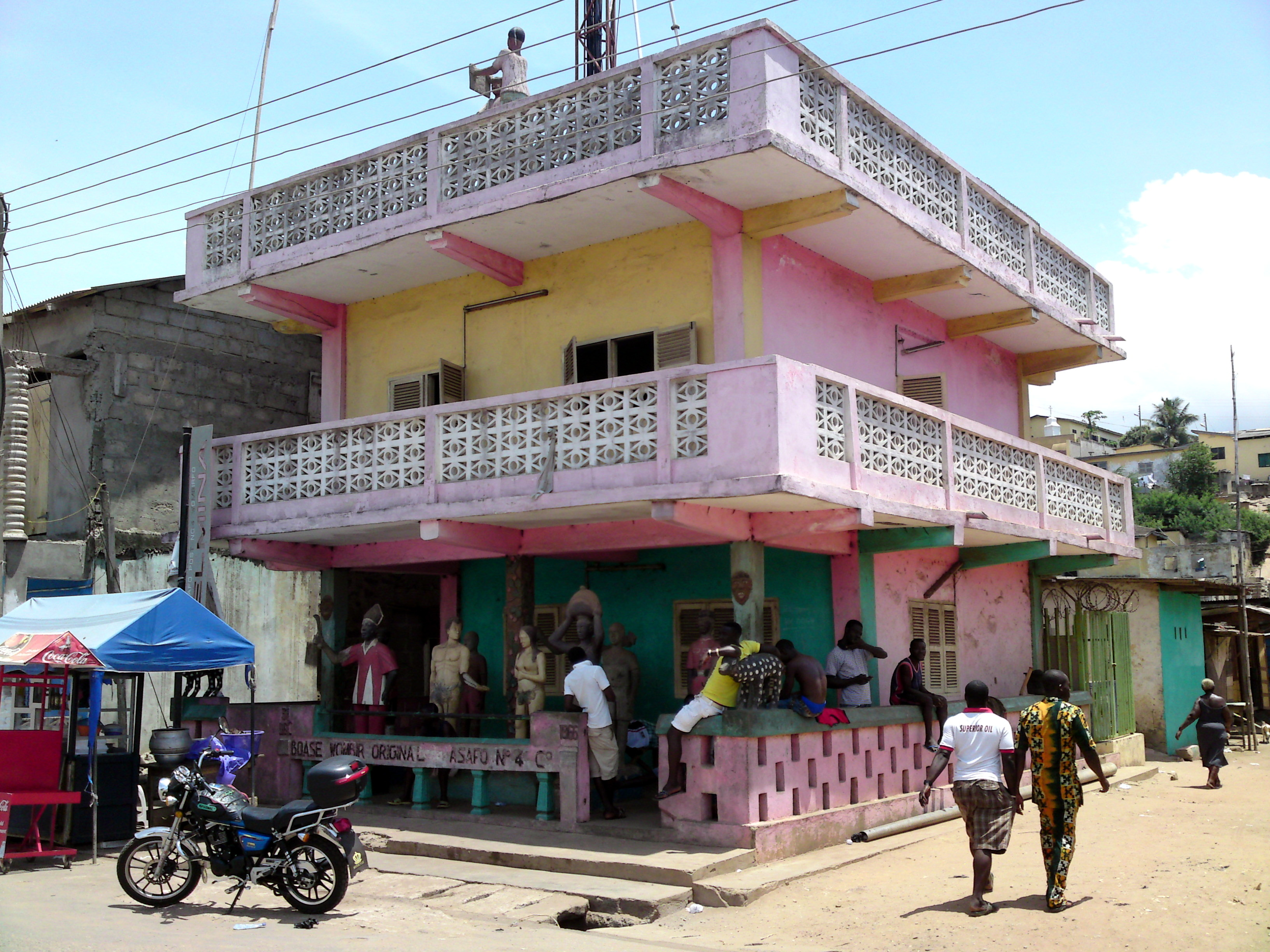
Posuban of Asafo company No. 4 Wombir in Elmina.

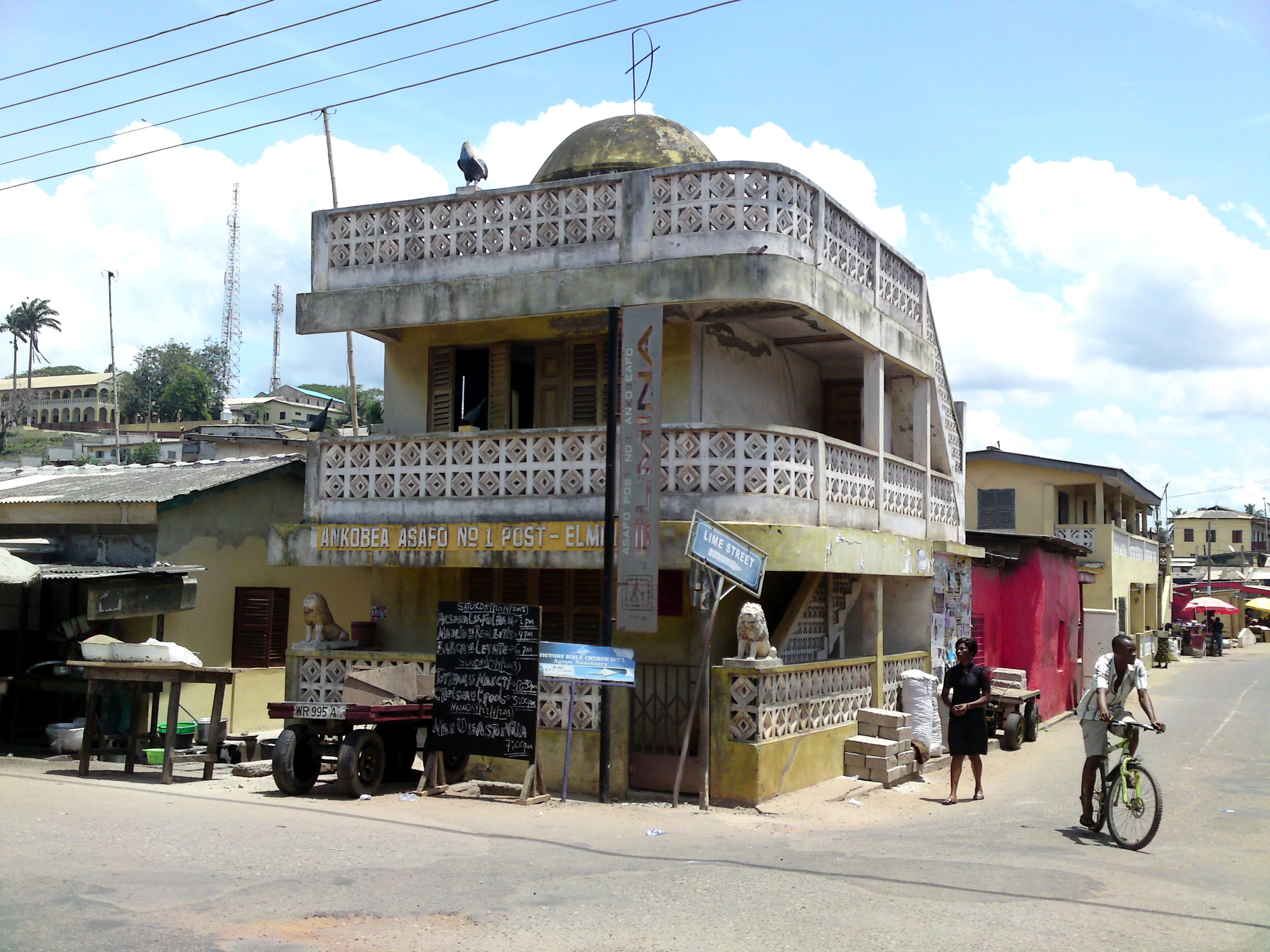
Posuban of Asafo company No. 1 Ankobea.

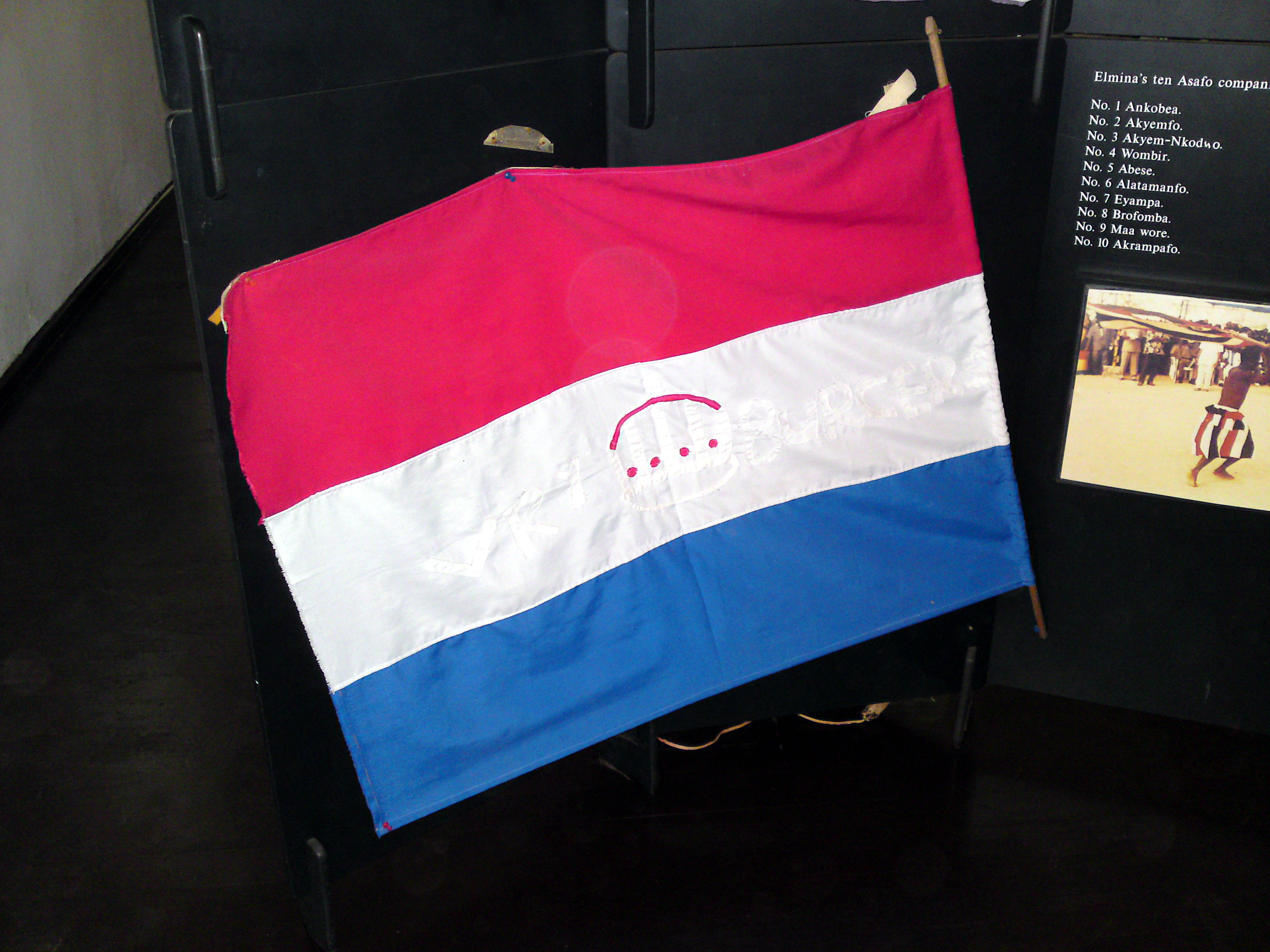
Flag of Asafo company No. 10 Akrampafo, also known as the Vrijburgers, which is written (white-on-white, so difficult to see) on the white part of the flag.

In Elmina, Asafo companies emerged in the early 18th century out of the wards of Elmina that had existed since at least the 17th century. The omission of a description of Asafo companies in Willem Bosman's Nauwkeurige beschrijving (1703) leads academic Harvey Feinberg to the conclusion that these companies could not have been very important by that date. This changed in the first quarter of the 18th century, when the original three wards had been complemented by four new wards consisting of new immigrant groups to Elmina.

In 1724, when the Dutch needed the help of the Elminese to oust John Canoe from Fort Groß Friedrichsburg, they organized the wards into rank order, with each ward having a number and an established military formation. It was this occasion that gave rise to the domination of Asafo companies in the socio-political life of Elmina, and of the 10 Asafo companies existing today, seven are mentioned in 1724:

- No. 1 Ankobea (also Ankobia)
- No. 2 Akyemfo (also Akim)
- No. 3 Akyem-Nkodwo (also Encodjo)
- No. 4 Wombir (previously Assamfoe, Appendjafoe)
- No. 5 Abese (also Abesi)
- No. 6 Alatamanfo (also Allade, Adjadie)
- No. 7 Eyampa

All companies were headed by a tufohen, and each one of them had its own flag. The Asafo companies were ranked in reverse order of importance. Asafo company No. 7 Eyampa is supposed to be the company of the founder of Elmina, Kwa Amankwaa. This company still elects the King of Elmina, who must either be from the Nsona or Anona royal family. Asafo company No. 3 Akyem-Nkodwo elects the leader of all Asafo companies known as the Great Ensign (Dutch: Groot Vaandrig). This was the case under Dutch influence. However, the commander of all the Asafo companies in Elmina is now known as the Tufuhene. The importance of rank is illustrated by the conflict between No. 5 Abese and No. 6 Alatamanfo in the late 1750s over the number six position. It was only when Governor Jan Pieter Theodoor Huydecoper threatened to fire cannon from Fort Coenraadsburg into Elmina that the conflict was finally settled.

In the 19th century, three Asafo companies were added to the existing seven:

- No. 8 Brofomba
- No. 9 Maa wore
- No. 10 Akrampafo

No. 8 Brofomba consisted of refugees from Eguafo and Simbiw, who fled to Elmina during the Fante War of 1810. No. 9 Maa wore consisted of the descendants of the slaves who had worked for the Dutch West India Company and who were collectively dismissed in the early 19th century. No. 10 Akrampafo consisted of free citizens (Dutch: vrijburgers). This company comprised mulattoes who were considered equals to the European officers, and who often worked in the lower ranks of the Dutch administration. This company elected the burgomaster of Elmina.

=== Cape Coast ===
In Cape Coast (Oguaa traditional area) there are traditionally seven asafo companies: Bentsir, Anaafo, Ntin, Nkum, Brofomba, Akrampa and Amanful. Each company is headed by a superior captain ("Supi") and under the Supi is a captain ("Safohen"). The leader of the asafo companies is the Tufuhen, also spelled Twafohen or Twaafohen (master of arms), who is regarded as the General Captain with responsibility for giving orders and directing affairs if war breaks out.

The asafo companies feature largely in the Fetu Afahye festival of Cape Coast, held annually on the first Saturday of September.

== Colours ==
Each asafo company has designated uniform colours that have been historically established. Esi Sutherland-Addy identifies these in Oguaa as:

- No. 1. Bentsir – red
- No. 2. Anafo – blue and white
- No. 3. Ntsin – green
- No. 4. Nkum – yellow
- No. 5. Amanful – wine and black
- No. 6. Abrofomba (Brofo Nkoa) – white
- No. 7. Ankrampa – white and black

== See also ==
- Akan chieftaincy
