= Mankessim =

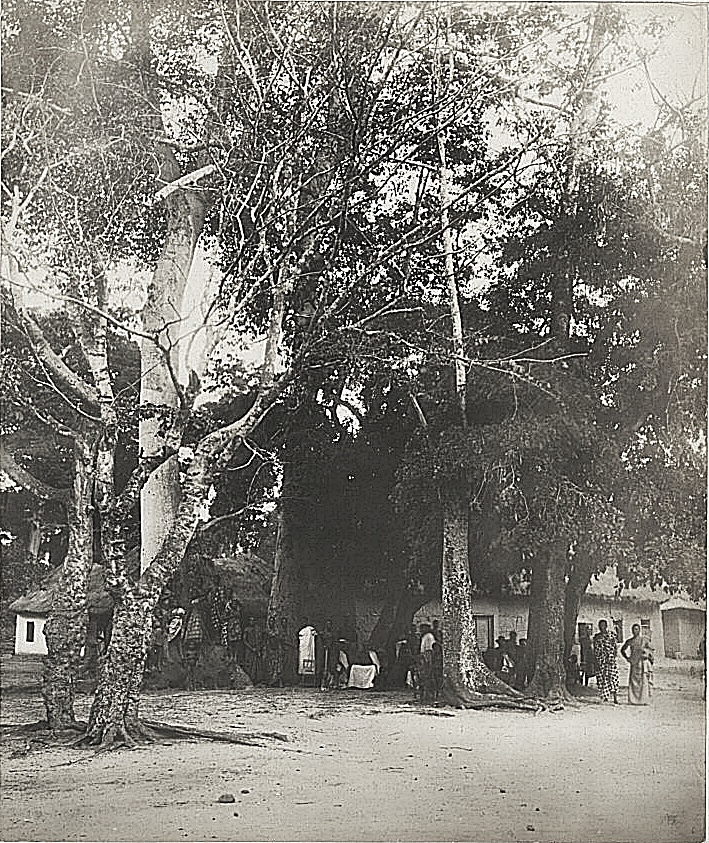
- Mankessim street

- Location in Ghana
- Coordinates: 5°16′N 1°01′W
- Country: Ghana
- Region: Central Region

Mankessim is a town in the Central Region of Ghana, West Africa. It is approximately 75 km west of Accra, on the main road to Sekondi-Takoradi. It is the traditional headquarters of the Fante ethnic group of Ghana. Mankessim's history is linked to three famed warriors: Obrumankoma, Odapagyan and Oson, who helped the Fante people migrate from Techiman in the current Bono Region to Adoagyir in the Central Region. The town is located at an elevation of 75 meters above sea level and its population according to the 2010 Census was 38,313.

Mankessim is the traditional paramountcy for all Fante-speaking people and was the location of the sacred Nananom Pow (sacred grove) which is also near Obidan. It has a large market that attracts traders from Ghana and beyond. Just as in other prominent Fante towns, Mankessim has Asafo companies, traditional military groups which no longer fight wars but are acknowledged for their role in the history and development of the town.

== History ==
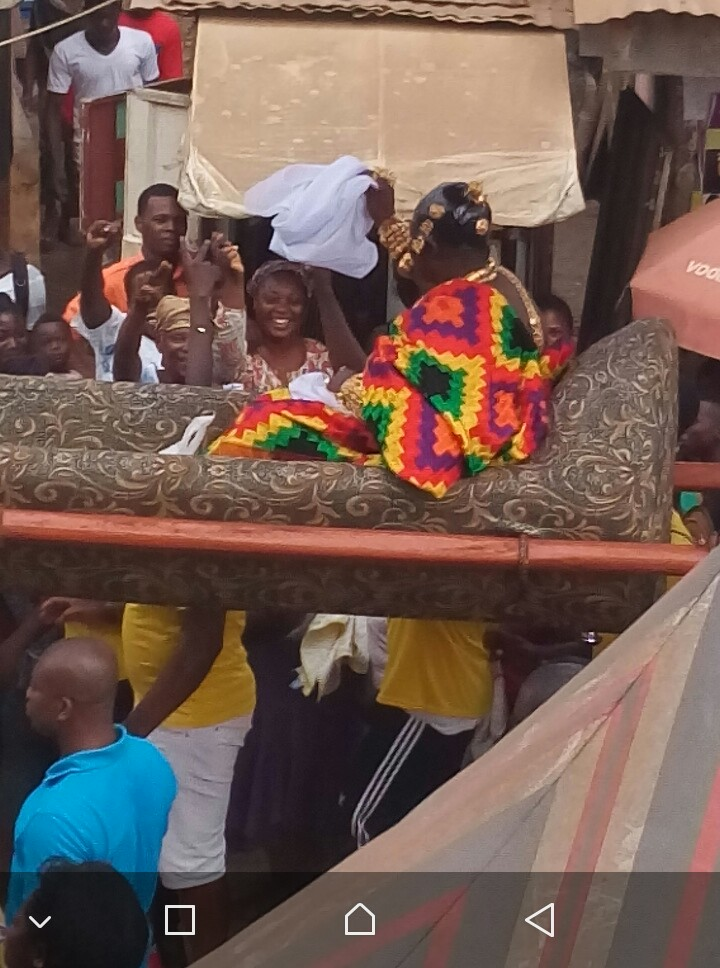
Chief enstoolment

In many oral traditions of the Fante people, Mankessim was the first Akan settlement to be founded after the Fantes migrated to the Atlantic coast from the wooded interior of the region, led by the legendary founders Oburumankoma, Odapagyan, and Oson. (Other traditions place Mankessim as a secondary settlement to Kwaman.) According to Rebecca Shumway, "a lack of reliable sources prohibits dating this migration with any certainty, but historians tend to agree that the Akan settlement at Mankessim occurred prior to the arrival of Portuguese traders on the Ghana coast in the 1470s". In the eighteenth century, the settlement was known among English traders and colonists as Murram.

In the mid-nineteenth century, the chief of Mankessim was the paramount chief of the Fante. John Brandford Crayner lists the following recorded chiefs of Mankessim:

1. Eduono-Egyin 1502
2. Kweku Befi 1585
3. Ɔkofo Gyesi 1601
4. Boa Amponsem 1740
5. Adoko Panyin 1827
6. Adoko Kuma 1831
7. Nana Obosu 1844
8. Kwesi Edu 1851
9. Kweku Mbir 1860
10. Edu Agyeman 1910
11. Aborbora-Katakyi 1915
12. Boako 1922
13. Adoko II 1925–68
14. Adoko V 1969–76
15. Nana OSIPII III 2020

== Health ==
Mankessim has a number of hospitals and clinics, and therefore, access to healthcare in the town is quite high. Some of these health centers are the Mercy Women's hospital located near the Manna Heights Hotel and Conference Center, Fynba Hospital, and a branch of the Sanford World Clinic in Ghana (inaugurated in 2013).

== Recreation ==
Mankessim has ecological and cultural sites, as well as hotels and guest houses.

== Education ==
Mankessim Traditional Area currently has the following elementary schools:

- Mega-Hill International Schools
- New Galilee School Complex, known as NEGASCO (formerly Nasol)
- UCC Community School

Mankessim currently has several secondary schools. These include:

- Mankessim Senior High School
- Mankessim Senior High Technical School (MSHTS), is also known as MANSTECH
- Obama College
- St. Andrews College

== Notable people ==
- John Brandford Crayner; (born 1925 or 1926), was a Ghanaian historian and educator known for his scholarly work and documenting the history of the Fante people back to the migration to what is now Ghana from East Africa. He also documented the traditional leaders, their lineage and the roles of traditional chiefs in various parts of Ghana Africa. See www.wikidata.org
- Lydia Forson; actress - born in 1984
- Augustine Arhinful; footballer - born in 1994.
- Nanahemaa Ama Amissah III; Paramount Queen Mother of Mankessim was born July 2, 1994, and died in 2026 in the United States. She was 60 years old and died after a short illness.
- Osagyefo Amanfo Edu VI; the current (Omahen) Paramount Chief, Mankessim Traditional Area, Central Region of Ghana, Africa. ^{[16]}
- Nana Efua Adadzewa 1st; (Teresa R. Kemp) was born August 9, 1957, in Baumholder West Germany. She is an American historian who was enstooled in September of 2015, under the late Paramount Queen Mother-Nana Ama Amissah III and the Paramount Chief Omahen Osagyefo Edu VI,

== See also ==
- Mankessim murder
