= Dunkwa United =

Pacific Heroes Football Club
- Full name: Pacific Heroes
- Founded: 2009
- Ground: Ghana
- Capacity: N/A
- Owner: ERIC OPPONG YEBOAH
- Chairman: ERIC OPPONG YEBOAH
- Manager: PETROS KOUKOURAS
- League: Division One League Zone 2A

Dunkwa United is a Ghanaian professional football team that plays in the 2 Zone of the Ghana Division One League. The team changed its name to Pacific Heroes F.C. after the team relocated to Asante Akyem Agogo under a new management through the leadership of business tycoon Eric Oppong Yeboah Zone 2A has seven competing teams from the part of the Ashanti Region, Western Region and the Central Region of Ghana.
