= John Brandford Crayner =

John Brandford Crayner (born 1925 or 1926) is a Ghanaian educationalist, described by Mary A. S. Owusu and Lawrence Bosiwah as "a Fante legend" and by Ghana's Business and Financial Times as a "renowned Fante historian" on account of his stature as a historian of the Fante people. As of 2020 he was, according to social media posts by his family, still alive, though social media commentary in 2025 considered him to have died.

== Life ==
Crayner took a qualification in music at the University of Ghana, Legon, in the Institute of African Studies's School of Music, and a teaching qualification. He was later noted as a fɔntɔmfrɔm player. His first wife was Mary Akweesi, daughter of Kwaa Otwe (also known as Joseph Akweesi, the grandson of Akweesi). He also married Mercy Turkson (also known as Nana Esi Kuma Bueduwa).

== Works ==
- Akweesi egu nananom pɔw (Accra: Bureau of Ghana Languages, 1967) [translated and updated as Crayner, John Brandford (1979). Akweesi and the Fall of Nananom Pɔw. Methodist Book Depot. ISBN 9988786905.]
- Bɔrbɔr Kunkumfi (1969) [repr. as Bɔrbɔr Kunkumfi: The History of the Migration of the Fantes from Tekyiman to their Present Homes (Accra: Bureau of Ghana Languages, 1989)]
- Crayner, J. B. (1992). Ahotsew ye. Accra: Adwinsa Publications. ISBN 996497521X.
- Crayner, J. B. (1998). Yeehyiahyia oo!. Accra: Bureau of Ghana Languages. ISBN 9964201753.
