= Catherine Afeku =

Ghanaian politician

Hon. Catherine Afeku MP
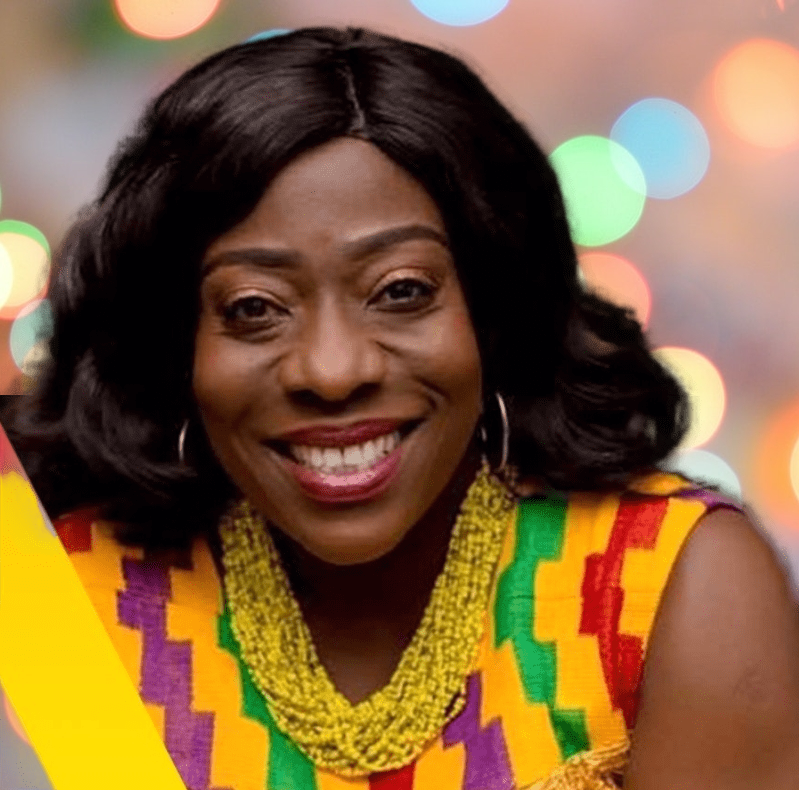
- Catherine Afeku

Minister of Tourism, Culture and Creative Arts
- In office February 2017 – February 2019
- President: Nana Akuffo-Addo
- Succeeded by: Barbara Oteng Gyasi

Member of Parliament for Evalue-Ajomoro-Gwira Constituency
- In office 7 January 2017 – 6 January 2021
- President: Nana Akuffo-Addo
- Preceded by: Kweku Tanikyi Kesse
- Succeeded by: Kofi Arko Nokoe

Member of Parliament for Evalue-Ajomoro-Gwira Constituency
- In office 7 January 2009 – 6 January 2013
- President: John Dramani Mahama
- Preceded by: Kojo Armah
- Succeeded by: Kweku Tanikyi Kesse

Personal details
- Born: Catherine Ablema Afeku; 27 June 1967 (age 59) Axim in the Western Region
- Party: New Patriotic Party
- Spouse: Seth Afeku
- Children: 3
- Education: DeVry University
- Occupation: Politician
- Profession: Marketer
- Committees: Communication Committee; Business Committee

Catherine Ablema Afeku (born June 27, 1967) is a Ghanaian politician. She is a member of the New Patriotic Party and the Member of Parliament for the Evalue Gwira Constituency in the Western Region. She was a cabinet minister in the Nana Akuffo-Addo administration and served as the Minister of Tourism, Culture and Creative Arts of Ghana from February 2017 to February 2019.

She was reshuffled from the Ministry of Tourism to the Presidency of the Republic of Ghana on 28 February 2019. She is currently a Minister of State at the Office of the President, assigned to the Office of the Senior Minister.

== Early life and education ==
She was born at Axim and attended Nsein Senior High School, now Kwame Nkrumah Senior High School, Axim in the Western Region. She obtained a Master of Business Administration from the Keller Graduate School of Management of DeVry University in Atlanta, Georgia in the year 2000.

== Working life ==
Afeku has worked with the World Bank and Stico Petroleum in Kenya, where she served as a business development consultant. She was also employed at the Inlingua School of languages in Brescia, Italy. In the early 2000s she became a Government of Ghana spokesperson for infrastructure in the John Agyekum Kufour administration.

== Political career ==
Afeku entered Ghanaian politics in the early 2000s during the presidency of John Agyekum Kufuor. She was a government spokesperson for infrastructure.

=== Member of parliament ===
She contested in the 2008 general election for the Evalue Gwira constituency. She defeated the incumbent, Kojo Armah of the Convention People's Party, by obtaining 11,671 votes. In the 5th Parliament of the 4th Republic of Ghana, she served as a member first of the Road and Transport Committee and then as a deputy ranking member of the Communications Committee. She later became a member of the Business Committee of Parliament. She lost her re-election bid for parliament in the 2008 general election. She again contested the constituency's seat during the 2016 Parliamentary election, where she defeated the incumbent, Kweku Tanikyi Kesse of the National Democratic Congress, obtaining 11,641 votes out of the 20,179, representing 57.7% of total votes cast.

=== Minister of Tourism ===
In January 2017, President Akuffo-Addo nominated Afeku for the position of Minister for Tourism. As tourism minister, she has embarked on several trips to market the country's tourist attractions and potential.

In March 2017, she travelled to The People's Republic of China, where she held meetings with investors and exhibitors to showcase tourist sites and the arts and culture of Ghana.

Afeku was appointed Chairperson of the Leadership Taskforce of the United Nations World Tourism Organization (UNWTO). This was announced on 25 January 2018.

==== Vetting controversy ====
Prior to being vetted by the Parliamentary Appointment Committee, reports emerged that Catherine and her husband were defendants in a civil case of breach of contract in 2007. The reports showed that the Afekus had been directed by an Accra High Court to pay $217,464.00 plus 50% interest to an American couple, Patricia and Bill Gick, after charges of fraud had been brought against them. Catherine and her husband had failed to honour the instructions of the court. A pressure group calling itself Truth and Accountable Governance petitioned President Akuffo-Addo to remove her from her ministerial position. When probed by the committee, Afeku made it known that payment had not been made because an appeal filed in 2013 was yet to be heard; hence, she could not preempt judgement.

Her vetting by the Appointments Committee of Parliament was held on 6 February 2017. During the vetting process, members of the minority argued that approval should not be given because she had not done the one-year mandatory National Service. Her defense for not honouring her constitutional obligation was due to her being in Nairobi, Kenya, with her parents at the stipulated time. Her nomination was approved on 11 February 2017 after she presented the Appointments Committee with a waiver letter given her by the National Service Secretariat. The approval was by consensus.

=== Cabinet minister ===
In May 2017, President Akufo-Addo named Afeku as one of the 19 ministers who would form his cabinet. The names of the 19 ministers were submitted to the Parliament of Ghana and announced by the Speaker of the House, Rt. Hon. Prof. Mike Ocquaye. As a cabinet minister, Afeku was part of the president's inner circle and is to aid in key decision-making activities in the country.

== Personal life ==
Catherine is married to Seth Afeku with whom she has three children. She is a Christian and a member of the Catholic Church, Ghana.
