= Kojo Armah =

Ghanaian diplomat, lawyer and politician

Member of Parliament for Evalue-Ajomoro-Gwira Constituency
- In office 7 January 1996 – 6 January 2001
- President: Jerry John Rawlings

Member of Parliament for Evalue-Ajomoro-Gwira Constituency
- In office 7 January 2005 – 6 January 2009
- President: John Agyekum Kufour
- Succeeded by: Catherine Ablema Afeku

Municipal Chief Executive for Nzema East
- In office January 2001 – January 2005
- President: John Agyekum Kufour

Personal details
- Born: James Evans Armah; 27 November 1945 Axim, Ghana
- Died: 4 May 2014 (aged 68) Accra, Ghana
- Party: Convention People's Party
- Spouse: Sabina Akainyah
- Children: 3
- Education: Apam Senior High School, University of Ghana, Ghana School of Law
- Occupation: Politician
- Profession: Lawyer

Kojo Armah (27 November 1945 – 4 May 2014) was a Ghanaian diplomat, lawyer and politician. He was a member of the Convention People's Party and a former Member of Parliament for the Evalue-Ajomoro-Gwira constituency in the Western Region. He was also an educationist and linguist. He represented the Evalue-Ajomoro-Gwira constituency on two separate occasions, from 1996 to 2000 and from 2004 to 2008. He also served as the Municipal Chief Executive for Nzema East from 2001 through 2004.

== Early life and education ==
James Evans Armah was born in Axim in the Western Region to James Enyimah Armah and Sikayena Baidoe. He was raised by his maternal aunt, Mrs. Quarshie, and her family. He received his primary education from Asokore Primary School and Apam Roman Catholic Middle School, and obtained his O and A level certificates from Apam Senior High School. In 1969, he graduated from the University of Ghana, Legon, with a Bachelor of Arts degree in political science. He obtained a post-graduate diploma in education at the University of Cape Coast.

== Working life ==
He moved to Axim after graduation from university and taught at Nsein Senior High School from 1969 to 1971. After completing his post-graduate course, he taught at Ghana Secondary Technical School in Takoradi. He resigned from his teaching position in 1973 to take up an appointment at the Research Bureau of the Ministry of Foreign Affairs as an assistant director grade II. He embarked on many diplomatic missions, one of which allowed him to pursue a diploma in French, Literature, and Civilization from the University of Tours in Touraine. As a diplomat, he held several positions in several mission countries, such as First Secretary and Head of Chancery at the Ghana Embassy in Conakry, Guinea, and Charge D'Affaires in Togo. Armah was promoted to the rank of assistant director grade I in 1977 after he had completed a diploma in public administration at the Ghana Institute of Management and Public Administration.

After 31 December 1981 coup d'etat in Ghana, he was recalled to the country and posted to the African and European Desk at the Research Department of the Ministry of Foreign Affairs, where he served from 1982 to 1984. He was transferred to the Ghana Museums and Monuments Board in 1984 as an administrative secretary. He was promoted to the position of deputy director at the Office of the Head of Civil Service. Whilst at the ministry, he enrolled at the Ghana School of Law and was called to the Ghana Bar in 1987. In 1992, he retired from public service to pursue a career in private law and politics. He owned Ankobra FM, a private radio station based in Axim.

== Political career ==
In the 1996 general election, the New Patriotic Party had a strategic political partnership with the Convention People's Party, dubbed The Great Alliance. One result of the partnership allowed Armah to win the Evalue Gwira seat in 1996. He lost his bid to be re-elected as MP for the constituency in 2000. In the 2004 parliamentary election the New Patriotic Party went into alliance again with the Convention People's Party and presented Armah as a unified candidate. He won the election and returned to parliament in 2005. In the 2008 parliamentary election Armah lost his bid for re-election to Catherine Afeku of the New Patriotic Party.

=== Municipal Chief Executive ===
When the New Patriotic Party won the 2000 general election, President John Agyekum Kufour appointed Armah as the Municipal Chief Executive for Nzema East District. Armah served in that position for one term, from 2000 through the end of 2004.

=== Kojo Armah Committee ===
Armah was made chair of the Kojo Armah Committee, an ad hoc committee of parliament. The committee was set up to investigate the circumstances leading to the substitution of cocaine evidence with corn dough at the Police Narcotics Exhibit Room in the Criminal Investigations Department of the Ghana Police Service.

== Personal life ==
In 1973 Armah married Sabina Akainyah; they had three children. He was a member of the Catholic Church.

== Death ==
Armah died on 4 May 2014 at the Korle Bu Teaching Hospital in Accra. He died on the same weekend and at the same hospital as Kofi Ansah, an internationally acclaimed Ghanaian fashion designer.
