= Isaac Kwadwo Adjei-Mensah =

Ghanaian politician (1944–2015)

Hon. Isaac Kwadwo Adjei Mensah

Member of Parliament for Techiman North Constituency
- In office 7 January 1997 – 6 January 2005
- President: John Kufuor

Personal details
- Born: 20 September 1944
- Died: 7 June 2015 (aged 70)
- Party: National Democratic Congress
- Relations: Elizabeth Ofosu-Agyare (daughter)
- Education: University of London, Queen Mary College, Grays Inn
- Profession: Politician, Lawyer

Isaac Kwadwo Adjei Mensah (20 September 1944 – 7 June 2015) was a Ghanaian politician and was the member of parliament for the Techiman North constituency in the Brong Ahafo region of Ghana. He was a member of parliament in the 2nd and 3rd parliament of the 4th republic of Ghana and a Regional Minister for the Brong-Ahafo Region, as well as a Minister of Water Resources, Works and Housing.

== Early life and education ==
Adjei Mensah hailed from Jama Tempori in the Brong-Ahafo Region of Ghana. He was born on 20 September 1944. He attended the University of London and obtained a Bachelor of Laws degree. He also attended Queen Mary College and obtained a Master of Law (LL.M). He then attended Gray's Inn and obtained from there a Legum Baccalaureus (LL.B). Adjei Mensah's academic major was in Law.

== Career ==
Adjei Mensah was a lawyer by profession. He was also a Ghanaian politician.

== Politics ==
Adjei Mensah was a member of the National Democratic Congress. He was elected as the member of parliament for the Techiman North constituency in the Brong Ahafo region in the 3rd parliament of the 4th republic of Ghana. He was succeeded by Alex Kyeremeh in the 2004 Ghanaian General elections. He was first elected into parliament on 7 January 1997 after he emerged winner at the 1996 Ghanaian General Elections.

== Elections ==
Adjei Mensah was elected as the member of parliament for the Techiman North constituency in the 2000 Ghanaian general elections. He was elected on the ticket of the National Democratic Congress. His constituency was a part of the 7 parliamentary seats out of 21 seats won by the National Democratic Congress in that election for the Brong Ahafo Region. The National Democratic Congress won a minority total of 92 parliamentary seats out of 200 seats in the 3rd parliament of the 4th republic of Ghana. He was elected with 9,830 votes out of 20,362 total valid votes cast. This was equivalent to 49.8% of the total valid votes cast. He was elected over Isaac Osei-Antwi of the New Patriotic Party, Thomas Oti of the National Reform Party, James Stephen Fordwour of United Ghana Movement and Yeboah Godfrey of the Convention People's Party. These obtained 10,563, 533, 529 and 177 votes respectively out of the total valid votes cast. These were equivalent to 39.5%, 2.0%, 2.0% and 0.7% respectively of total valid votes cast. The electorates in that election of 2000 in the Techiman North Constituency exhibited a "skirt and blouse" kind of voting as the presidential candidate elected in that constituency was John Kuffour of the opposition New Patriotic Party.

== Personal life ==
Adjei Mensah was a Christian. He was the father of Elizabeth Ofosu-Agyare, former Minister for Minister for Tourism, Culture and Creative Arts, who is currently the Member of Parliament for Techiman North where he served as MP as well.

== Death ==
Adjei Mensah died on 7 June 2015.
