= Kweku Tanikyi Kesse =

Ghanaian politician

MP for Evalue-Gwira constituency
- In office January 2013 – January 2017
- President: John Dramani Mahama
- Preceded by: Catherine Afeku
- Succeeded by: Catherine Afeku

Personal details
- Born: 7 July 1967 (age 58)
- Party: National Democratic Congress
- Occupation: Politician

Kweku Tanikyi Kesse is a Ghanaian engineer and politician. He is a former Member of Parliament of Evalue Gwira Constituency and a member of the National Democratic Congress of Ghana. He lost his re-election bid to Catherine Afeku in the 2016 parliamentary election whom he had earlier defeated during the 2012 parliamentary election.

== Early life and education ==
Kesse was born on 7 July 1967. He hails from Bamiankor, a town in the Western Region of Ghana. He obtained his Master of Science degree in Automatic Control Engineering from the Universidad Central de Las Villas, Cuba in 1994.

== Career ==
Kesse worked at the Tema Oil Refinery as a Projects Engineer from 1997 to 2002. He later joined RAM Engineering Limited where he worked as a Project Manager from 2004 to 2009. From 2009 until 2012, Kesse was the managing director of KABK Engineering Limited

== Politics ==
Kesse entered parliament on 7 January 2013 representing the Evalue-Gwira constituency on the ticket of the National Democratic Congress. He lost the seat in 2016 to Catherine Afeku of the New Patriotic Party

== Personal life ==
Kesse is married with three children. He identifies as a Christian.
