= Martin Gyarko Oti =

Ghanaian politician

Hon Martin Gyarko Oti

Member of the Ghana Parliament for Techiman North Constituency
- In office 6 January 2017 – 7 January 2021
- Succeeded by: Elizabeth Ofosu-Agyare

Personal details
- Born: April 3, 1980 (age 46) Aworowa, Ghana
- Party: New Patriotic Party
- Education: University of Cape Coast
- Occupation: Politician
- Profession: Tutor

Martin Gyarko Oti is a Ghanaian politician and member of the Seventh Parliament of the Fourth Republic of Ghana representing the Techiman North Constituency in the Bono East Region on the ticket of the New Patriotic Party. He was the former Deputy Minister for Bono East Region.

== Early life and education ==
Oti was born on 3 April 1980 and hails from Aworowa in the Bono East Region of Ghana. He had his Bachelor's degree in Social Science from the University of Cape Coast in 2008.

== Career ==
Oti was a tutor at Ayeasu-Atrensu District Assembly Junior High School.

== Politics ==
Oti is a member of New Patriotic Party. He was the member of parliament of the Techiman North Constituency from 2017 to 2021. In the 2020 Ghanaian general elections, he lost the parliamentary seat to the NDC parliamentary candidate Elizabeth Ofosu-Agyare. He had 21,008 votes making 47.5% of the total votes cast whilst Elizabeth had 23,252 votes making 52.5% of the total votes cast.

== Personal life ==
Oti is a Christian.
