= Edith Hazel =

Ghanaian politician

Hon. Edith Hazel

Member of parliament for Evalue Gwira constituency
- In office 7 January 2001 – 6 January 2005

Personal details
- Party: National Democratic congress
- Occupation: Politician

Edith Hazel is a Ghanaian politician and diplomat who served as the Member of Parliament for the Evalue Gwira constituency in the Western Region of Ghana from 2001 to 2005.

== Early life and education ==
Hazel attended the University of Ghana. Until she was appointed as a Ghanaian ambassador to Denmark and Finland in July 2014, she held the position of deputy head of Ghana's mission in Washington, D.C., U.S.

== Politics ==
Hazel was elected as the member of parliament for the Evalue Gwira constituency in the Western Region of Ghana in the 2000 Ghanaian general elections. She therefore was as a member of the 3rd parliament of the 4th republic with 6,598 votes with its equivalence of 42.80% on the ticket of the National Democratic Congress.

She won the seat in 2004 to Kojo Armah. She was elected over Kojo Armah of the Convention Peoples Party, Sagary Nokoe of the New Patriotic Party, Nana Kwabena Erskine of the National Reform Party. These obtained votes 5,994, 2,702 and 115 votes respectively of the total valid votes cast. These were equivalent to 38.90%, 17.50% and 0.70% respectively of the total valid votes cast.

Hazel was elected on the ticket of the National Democratic Congress.(NDC) The National Democratic Congress won a total of 9 parliamentary seats out of 19 seats in the Western Region in that elections. In all, the party won a minority total of 89 parliamentary representation out of 200seats in the 3rd parliament of the 4th republic of Ghana.
