= Timothy Ansah =

Ghanaian educationist and politician

Member of the Ghana Parliament for Tarkwa-Aboso
- In office 1965–1966
- Preceded by: New
- Succeeded by: Constituency abolished

Personal details
- Born: Timothy Ansah; 4 September 1919 Axim, Western Region, Gold Coast
- Died: 22 June 2008 (aged 88)
- Party: Convention People's Party
- Education: Wesley College, Kumasi; Achimota School; University of Cambridge
- Profession: Educationist

Timothy Ansah (1919-2008) was a Ghanaian educationist and politician. He was a member of parliament for the Tarkwa-Aboso constituency from 1965 to 1966. Prior to entering parliament, he taught in various educational institutions. He was the headmaster for Nsein Senior High School (then Kwame Nkrumah Secondary School) from 1960 to 1974.

== Early life and education ==
Ansah was born on 4 September 1919 at Axim, a town in the Western Region of Ghana. He had his early education at York Hall School in Axim. He later proceeded to Wesley College, Achimota School and King's College, Cambridge. At Cambridge, he pursued a bachelor's degree program in History and pursued a post graduate course in Diploma of Education. He won his Cambridge Blue as an athlete for the Cambridge University competing against athletes from the University of Oxford for three years.

== Career and politics ==
Ansah returned to Ghana in 1950 and took up a teaching appointment at his alma mater; Wesley College. There, he taught Music and History. He later moved to Fijai Secondary School and in January 1957 he was appointed the assistant headmaster of the School. He served in that capacity until 1960 when he was appointed headmaster for the Kwame Nkrumah Secondary School (was later Axim Secondary but now Nsein Senior High School). He entered parliament in June 1965 representing the Tarkwa-Aboso constituency on the ticket of the Convention People's Party. He remained in parliament until February 1966 when the Nkrumah government was overthrown. He remained headmaster of Nsein Senior High School until 1974.

== Personal life ==
His hobbies included listening to music, writing songs and African studies. He composed Ghanaian patriotic songs such as Momoane Beyennzo in Nzema and Dzin Pa Sen Ahonya. He also participated in the contest for the selection of the National Anthem. He died on Sunday, 22 June 2008.

== Legacy ==
The Timothy Ansah Memorial Foundation Scholarships, a scholarship offered to students from the Western Region is named is his honour.

Nsein Senior High School hold the Timothy Ansah Lectures annually in his honour.

== Books ==
Kundum: festival of the Nzemas and Ahantas of the Western Region of Ghana (1999): ISBN 9988002211

== See also ==
- List of MPs elected in the 1965 Ghanaian parliamentary election
