= St. Monica's Senior High School =

Public high school in Ghana

Location
- P. O. BOX 17; Mampong, Ashanti Region; Ghana; 7.0457°N 1.4042°W

Information
- Type: Public high school
- Motto: Causa Conscientae (Conscious cause)
- Religious affiliation: Anglicanism
- Established: 1946 (80 years ago)
- Status: Active
- Oversight: Ministry of Education
- Gender: Girls
- Age: 14 to 18
- Classes offered: Business, general arts, general science, home economics, visual arts
- Houses: 6
- Colours: Blue and white
- Slogan: "St Monica, Mother of Saints/ Each For All, All For God"
- Song: "As we listen down the ages"
- Nickname: Munche

St. Monica's Senior High School is a girls' second-cycle institution in Mampong in the Ashanti Region of Ghana.

== Location ==
The school can be located on the Kumasi-Mampong Highway. It is 40 kilometres (25 miles) from Kumasi and lies on a hilly area thus the area is always cold. It is bounded on the north by the Ghana Highways Authority, Mampong; on the south by the Mampong Municipal Hospital; on the east by Mampong Babies' Home; and on the west by the Ejura-Mampong Highway.

== History ==
The school's history is traced to Rt Rev John Orfeur Aglionby, the Anglican Bishop of the Gold Coast whose missionary work birthed the Convent of Our Lady and Saint Monica.

In 1926, the bishop invited the sisters of the Order of the Holy Paraclete (England) to set up a school for girl-child education. In 1946, St Monica's Secondary School in Mampong was established as a separate institution from the Teacher Training College.

== Notable alumnae ==
- Marian Ewurama Addy, biochemist
- Yaa Ntiamoah Badu, zoologist; formerly Pro Vice Chancellor of the University of Ghana
- Janepare Bartels-Kodwo, Justice of the Supreme Court of Ghana (2025–)
- Rose Atinga Bio, Director General of Research and Planning of the Ghana Police Service
- Rita Akosua Dickson, phytochemist and the first female Vice-Chancellor of the Kwame Nkrumah University of Science and Technology.
- Elizabeth Ofosu-Agyare, politician; formerly former Minister for Tourism, Culture and Creative Arts
- Akosua Frema Osei-Opare, politician; first female Chief of Staff of Ghana

== See also ==
- Christianity in Ghana
- Education in Ghana
- List of senior high schools in the Ashanti Region
