= Elizabeth Ofosu-Adjare =

Ghanaian lawyer and politician

The Honourable Elizabeth Ofosu-Adjare MP
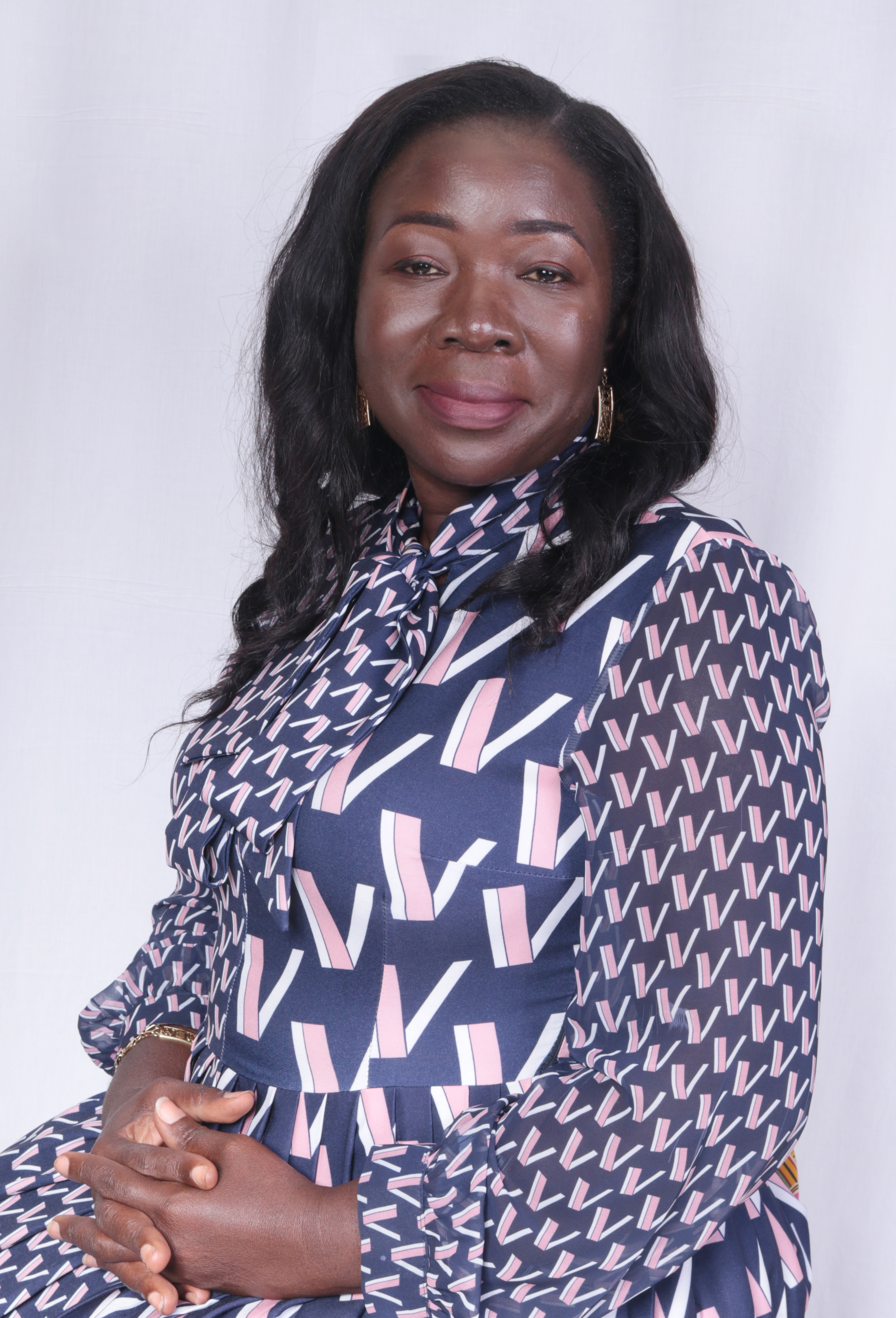

Member of Ghana Parliament for Techiman North Constituency
- Incumbent
- Assumed office 7 January 2021
- President: Nana Akufo-Addo
- Preceded by: Martin Gyarko Oti

Minister for Ministry of Trade, Agribusiness and Industry
- Incumbent
- Assumed office February 2025
- President: John Dramani Mahama
- Preceded by: K. T. Hammond

Personal details
- Born: 1 March 1974 (age 52) Berekum, Ghana
- Party: National Democratic Congress
- Spouse: Lawrence Ofosu-Adjare
- Relations: Isaac Kwadwo Adjei-Mensah (father)
- Children: 2
- Education: Ghana School of Law, Kwame Nkrumah University of Science and Technology, St Monica's Secondary School
- Occupation: Politician
- Profession: Lawyer
- Committees: Health Committee; Appointments Committee

Elizabeth Ofosu-Adjare (born March 1, 1974) is a Ghanaian lawyer and politician who served as Minister for Tourism, Culture and Creative Arts. She was appointed to this position by President John Mahama in 2013 when he formed his first substantive government. She is a member of the National Democratic Congress. and currently a member for the 8th and 9th Parliament of the 4th Republic of Ghana representing the Techiman North Constituency. Ofosu-Adjare has been appointed as Trade, Industry and Agribusiness Minister by John Dramani Mahama for his second term.

== Early life and education ==
Ofosu-Adjare is the third of ten girls born to Isaac Kwadwo Adjei Mensah, a lawyer, businessman and politician, and his wife, a businesswoman. She attended St Monica's Secondary School in Mampong, Kumasi, where she obtained both her O & A level certificates. Ofosu-Adjare then proceeded to the Kwame Nkrumah University of Science and Technology where she obtained a Bachelor of Arts in Social Science. She continued to the University of Ghana, Legon to pursue further studies in the field of Law and obtained honors in LLB in 2002. She later obtained a degree in law in 2004.

== Career ==
Ofosu-Adjare started her legal practice with the Holy Trinity Chambers in Kumasi, Ashanti Region in 2004 and rose to become a partner of the Firm. She also became a lawyer for the Legal Aid Scheme in the Ashanti Region. She has been a board member of the Multi Trust Financial Company in Kumasi from 2004 till date. She is currently a board member of the Federation Commodities Limited.

She was appointed to the Board of the Tema Oil Refinery in 2009 by the President of the Republic of Ghana and served from 2009 to 2013. Elizabeth Ofosu-Adjare was appointed on 1 March 2013 by President John Dramani Mahama to the newly created/realigned Ministry of Tourism, Culture & Creative Arts.

== Political career ==
=== 2024 elections ===
She contested again for Techiman North constituency seat on the ticket of the National Democratic Congress during the 2024 Ghanaian General Election and won with 22,513 as against her opponent from the New Patriotic party, Martin Gyarko Oti's 19,214.

=== 2020 elections ===
She contested for Techiman North constituency parliamentary seat on the ticket of National Democratic Congress (Ghana) during the 2020 Ghanaian general election and won with 23, 252 votes representing 52.53% of the total votes. She won the parliamentary seat over Martin Gyarko Oti of New Patriotic Party and Faustina Owusu Mensah of NDP. They had 21,008 votes and 1 vote respectful. These represent 47.46% and 00.00% respectful.

=== As Ministry of Tourism, Culture & Creative Arts ===
Ofosu-Adjare was appointed on 1 March 2013 by President John Dramani Mahama to the newly created/realigned Ministry of Tourism, Culture & Creative Arts. As the sector minister, she worked creditably with fourteen (14) Agencies under her ministry introduced innovative, novelty tourism programs as an addition to Ghana's Tourism products & Offerings.

==== ExploreGhana project ====
The Explore Ghana project, launched in 2014, aimed to stimulate domestic tourism in the country. Following its launch, the initiative received increased coverage from various outlets and organizations. This promotion aligns with the country's objective of developing a sustainable tourism model that offers diverse products for both local and international visitors.

==== National Festival for Arts & Culture ====
Another major traditional festival introduced was the Homogeneous Festival for the Ga State. For the first time in Ghana, the ministry nurtured this Homogeneous Festival to ensure the Greater Accra Region has its own brand festival. She also restructured the National Festival for Arts & Culture (NAFAC) and the famous Ghana Carnival introduced in her maiden year in office. She is also credited with the setting up of Tourism levy secretariat to help improve the collection & payment of the 1% Tourism levy. This levy has generated substantial funds for the execution of tourism projects especially in the area in of capacity building and tourism promotion.

==== Film Bill ====
Other achievements of Mrs. Ofosu-Adjare were done in the area of a legislative framework to support the work of the creative Arts industry She led the passage of the Film Bill, which went through cabinet and was approved by Parliament into become law. This new bill replaced the old Film Act of 1961 and was the first time such a new legislative framework was introduced to ensure the Film and Television sector got the much-needed legal backing in Ghana.

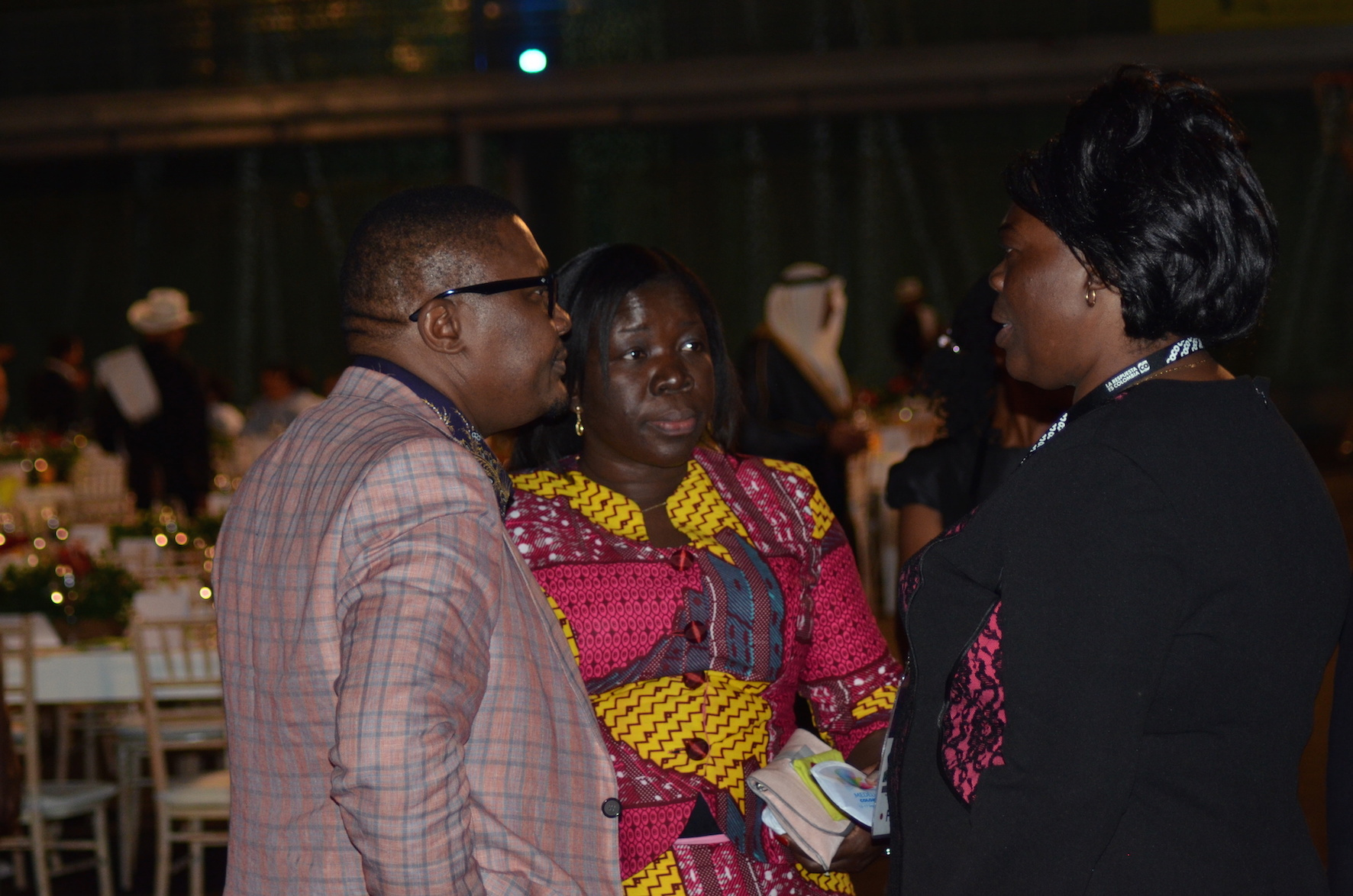
African ministers at 21st UNWTO General Assembly

==== Back to Seychelles Trip ====
She led a high-powered Government Delegation to accompany the return of the King of Ashanti Kingdom, Asantehene Otumfuo Osei Tutu II to the Seychelles Islands where the King of Ashanti, Nana Prempeh I was sent to exile during the Ashanti-British war in 1900. It was the first time a sitting Ashanti King has visited the Seychelles Islands.

==== International roles ====
On the International level, she has led Ghana's tourism sector by consistently appearing at the major Tourism fairs and exhibitions like the World Travel Market, International Tourism Bourse (ITB), FITUR International Travel Fair, Vakantiebeurs Holiday Fair, & China Outbound Tourism & Travel Market (COTTM). Never before has Ghana been marketed on the international level since the last three years of her tenure as the sector minister.

She lobbied her colleague African Ministers & the top echelons of the United Nations World Tourism Organization (UNWTO) to have Ghana host the first ever Brand Africa conference in Accra in August 2015. Her popularity and energetic role in the International Tourism matters helped Ghana to be elected on to the Executive Council of the UN Tourism body at its 21st UNWTO Session in Medellin Colombia.

=== Committees ===
She is a member of the Health Committee and also a member of the Appointments Committee.

== Personal life ==
She is married to Lawrence Ofosu-Adjare. She is the daughter of the late Isaac Kwadwo Adjei-Mensah, who served as Minister of Water Resources, Works and Housing during the Rawlings government, and was also Member of Parliament for Techiman North where she currently is a member of parliament.

== See also ==
- List of Mahama government ministers
- List of Mills government ministers

== External links and sources ==
Political offices
New title	Minister for Tourism, Culture and Creative Arts; 2013 – 2017	Succeeded by Catherine Afeku
