= William Otoo Ellis =

Ghanaian academic

Vice Chancellor of the Kwame Nkrumah University of Science and Technology
- Succeeded by: Kwasi Obiri-Danso

Professor William Otoo Ellis is a Ghanaian academic and a former Vice Chancellor of the Kwame Nkrumah University of Science and Technology. He is a product of Pope John Senior High School and Minor Seminary in Koforidua.

== Education ==
He started his basic school education at the Airport Police Basic Schools. He then continued to the St. John's Grammar School where he obtained his General Certificate Examination (GCE)/ Ordinary Level Certificate in 1979. He had his Sixth Form education at the Pope John Senior High School and Minor Seminary at Effiduase, Koforidua, completing in 1981. He was admitted into the then University of Science and Technology (UST) in 1982 and completed in 1987 with a Bachelor of Science, Second Class Upper Division in Biochemistry (after a year's shut down between 1982 and 1983 due to students' unrest).

He undertook his National Service at the Department of Biochemistry from 1987 to 1989 as a Teaching and Research Assistant with responsibilities for practical work, tutorial classes and research activities of the Faculty Members. In 1989, he obtained a Canadian International Development Agency (CIDA) Scholarship to undertake postgraduate studies at McGill University in Montreal, Canada. Professor Ellis entered the Masters' programme in Food Science at the Department of Food Science and Agricultural Chemistry. Following his exceptional academic performance in the first year, he was granted the option to enrol in the PhD programme after passing all the requisite Entrance Examinations. Professor Ellis completed his Doctor of Philosophy programme in Food Science in 1993.
