= George Owusu Mensah =

Ghanaian musician and pastor

- Born: 1959 or 1960
- Died: November 10, 2024
- Occupations: musician; pastor
- Years active: 1980–2024
- Children: 5, including Kofi Owusu Peprah

George Owusu Mensah was a Ghanaian gospel musician and pastor, best known for his song "Matwen Awurade Anim." He served as the head pastor of Grace Baptist Church in Amakom, Kumasi.

== Career ==
Mensah gained widespread recognition in Ghana's gospel music scene with his song "Matwen Awurade Anim," recorded in 1987. The song became one of the most popular Ghanaian gospel songs of all time and has been widely covered by several artists, including his son, Kofi Owusu Peprah.

== Personal life ==
He was the father of five, including gospel musician Kofi Owusu Peprah. He was also the elder brother of Rita Akosua Dickson, Vice-Chancellor of Kwame Nkrumah University of Science and Technology (KNUST).

Mensah died on November 10, 2024. His funeral was held on February 8, 2025.
