= Kwasi Obiri-Danso =

Ghanaian biological scientist and academic

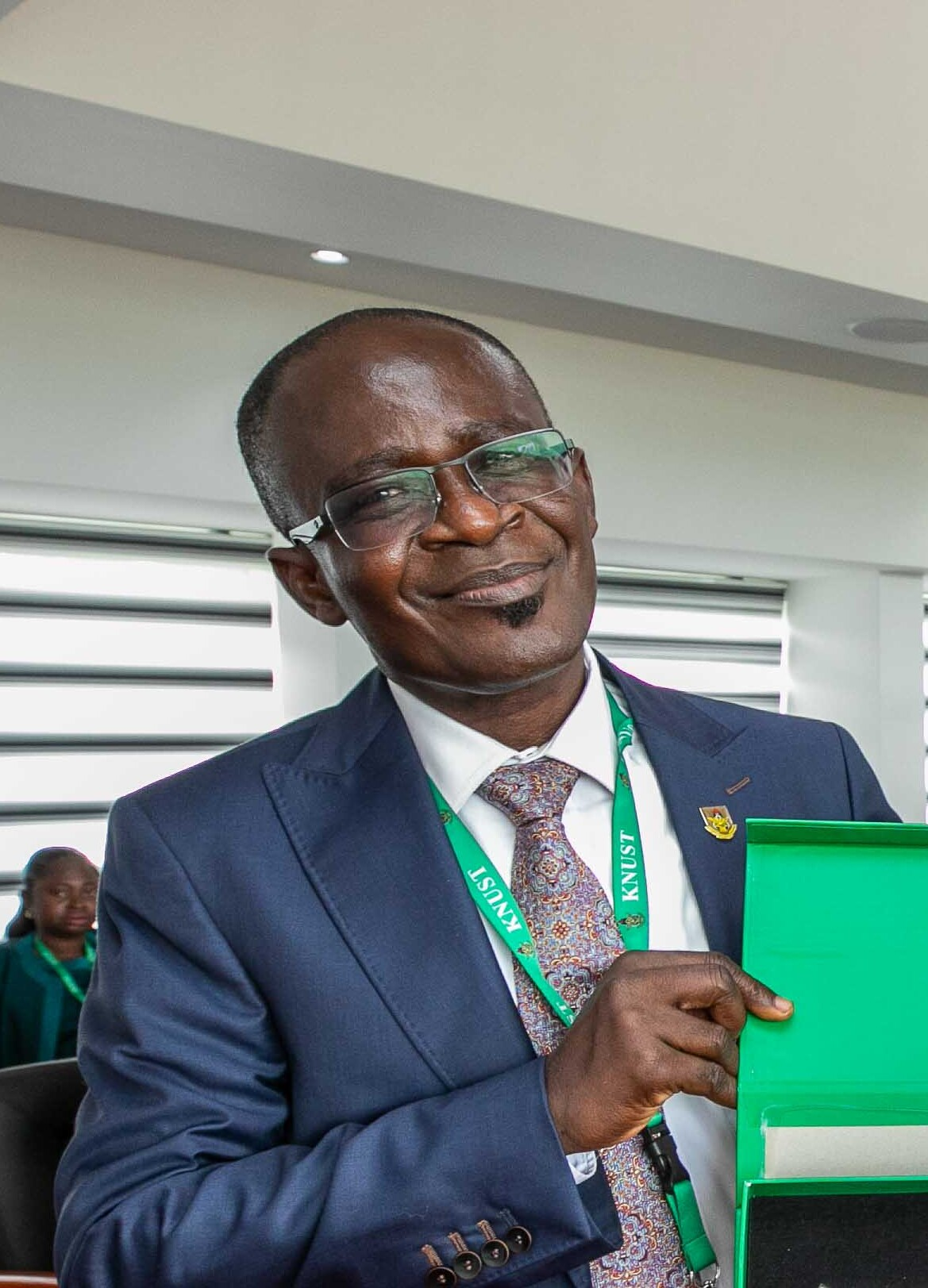
- Obiri-Danso in 2019

Vice Chancellor of the Kwame Nkrumah University of Science and Technology with Ambassador Stephanie S. Sullivan
- In office August 2016 – August 2020
- Preceded by: William Otoo Ellis
- Succeeded by: Rita Akosua Dickson

Personal details
- Education: Swedru Secondary School
- Alma mater: Kwame Nkrumah University of Science and Technology; Lancaster University
- Profession: Academic, Biological scientist

Kwasi Obiri-Danso is a Ghanaian biological scientist and academic who served as 10th Vice Chancellor of Kwame Nkrumah University of Scicence and Technology.

== Early life and education ==
Obiri-Danso had his GCE Ordinary level and Advanced level education at Swedru Secondary School. He furthered his education at Kwame Nkrumah University of Science and Technology where he graduated with a Bachelor of Science degree in Biological Sciences and later with a Master of Philosophy degree in Food Microbiology. He holds a PhD in Environmental Microbiology from Lancaster University, United Kingdom.

== Career ==
=== Academic career ===
Obiri-Danso began his career as a teaching assistant at Kwame Nkrumah University of Science and Technology, serving from 1987 to 1989. He was later promoted to the rank of lecturer, serving from 1990 to 2000. He was a research assistant at the Institute of Environmental Sciences in Lancaster University whilst he was offering his PhD, from 1996 to 1999. In 2000, after his return to Ghana, he was promoted to the rank of senior lecturer and further to an associate professor in 2007. He rose to the rank of professor of environmental microbiology/environmental health.

=== Vice Chancellor ===
On 19 May 2016, The University’s Council of the Kwame Nkrumah University of Science and Technology in a press statement announced his appointment as the new Vice-Chancellor to take over from William Otoo Ellis for a 4-year term effective 1 August 2016 to 21 July 2020. Prior to serving as Vice Chancellor he was the Provost of the College of Science at the university, Head of Department, Dean of Faculty and Dean at the International Programmes Office at different times of his academic career. He was later succeeded by Rita Akosua Dickson who served as his deputy as Pro-vice-chancellor when he was in office.

== See also ==
- Kwame Nkrumah University of Science and Technology
