= Kofi Arko Nokoe =

Ghanaian politician

Hon. Kofi Arko Nokoe
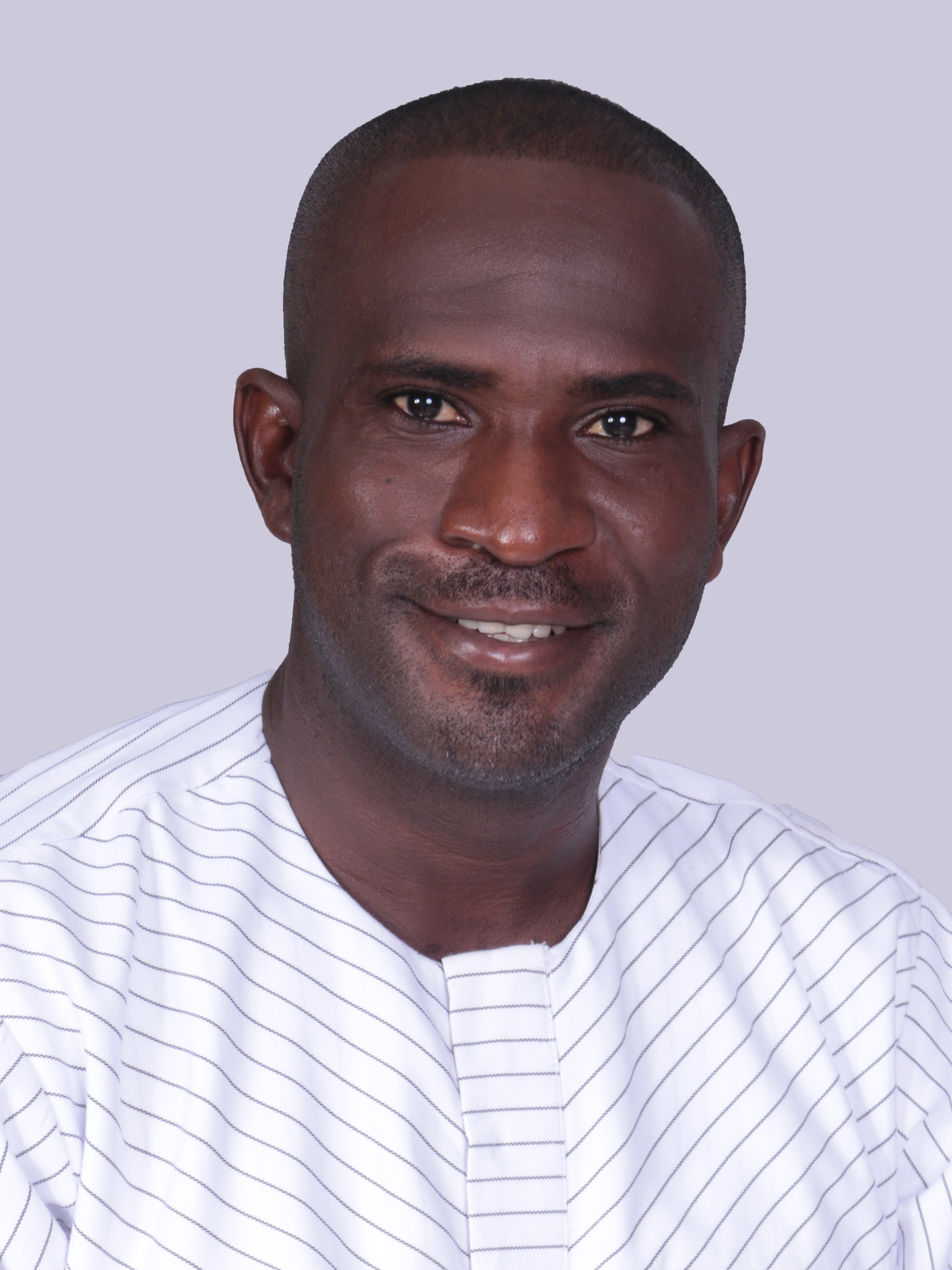

Member of Parliament for Evalue-Ajomoro-Gwira Constituency
- Incumbent
- Assumed office 7 January 2021
- Preceded by: Catherine Ablema Afeku

Personal details
- Born: 13 May 1983 (age 43) Axim, Ghana
- Party: National Democratic Congress
- Occupation: Politician
- Profession: Assistant Director
- Committees: Special Budget Committee; Foreign Affairs Committee

Kofi Arko Nokoe is a Ghanaian politician who is a member of the National Democratic Congress. He is the member of Parliament for the Evalue-Ajomoro-Gwira Constituency in the Western region.

== Early life and education ==
Nokoe was born on 13 May 1983 and hails from Axim in the Western Region of Ghana. He started his tertiary education at the Komenda College of Education. He attended the University of Ghana, where he completed with a Bachelor of Arts degree in Political studies. Nokoe also holds a master's degree in Development Studies from the Kwame Nkrumah University of Science and Technology.

== Career ==
Nokoe was the Senior Superintendent at the Ghana Education Service. He was also the Assistant Director at the Ministry of Local Government.

== Politics ==
=== Member of parliament ===
Nokoe won the parliamentary bid to represent the National Democratic Congress for the Evalue-Ajomoro-Gwira Constituency ahead of the 2020 elections on 28 September 2019 after polling 546 votes representing 64.2% beating his main contender, Herbert Kua Dickson who had 297 votes representing 34.9%.

In December 2020, He won the Evalue-Ajomoro-Gwira Constituency in the parliamentary elections unseating the incumbent member of parliament Catherine Ablema Afeku who is a former Minister of Tourism, Culture and Creative Arts. He won by polling 19,830 votes representing 53.4% against his closest opponent the incumbent member of parliament, Catherine Ablema Afeku of the New Patriotic Party who obtained 17,287 votes representing 46.6% of the votes cast. The Evalue-Ajomoro-Gwira seat was one of the seats that was taken away from the National Democratic Congress by the New Patriotic Party in the 2016 Parliamentary Elections but the party couldn't retain it for an extra 4 years.

=== Committees ===
Nokoe is a member of the Special Budget Committee and also a member of the Foreign Affairs Committee.

== Personal life ==
Nokoe is a Christian and worships as a Methodist.
