= Rose Atinga Bio =

Ghanaian police commissioner

Rose Bio Atinga
- Born: 1958 (age 67–68); Ghana
- Police career
- Department: Ghana Police Service
- Rank: Director General of Research and Planning

Rose Bio Atinga (born on November 30, 1957) is the first Ghanaian female police commissioner. She is a Frafra from the Upper East Region of Ghana.

She joined the Ghana Police in 1988 as an officer and rose through the ranks to become the fourth female Commissioner of Police in Ghana, having served in various capacities within the service across the country. Becoming the Director-General in charge of technology at the police headquarters, Bio-Atinga retired after 29 years of police work. Bio Atinga was among those tipped to become the Inspector General of Police in 2012. She retired on Thursday, November 30, 2017.

== Education ==
Bio Atinga received her GCE O-Level Certificate (1969–74) from St. Francis Secondary School. She received her A-Level Certificate (1974–76) from St. Monica's Secondary School. She earned a degree in political science and a master's degree in public administration from the School of Administration, University of Ghana. Bio Atinga obtained a post-graduate certificate in public administration from the Ghana Institute of Management and Public Administration (GIMPA) in 1985.

== Career ==
Rose Bio Atinga was enlisted into the Ghana Police Service in 1988 as an officer cadet alongside the IGP (Inspector General of Police) at the time, David Asante Apeatu, Patrick Timbill, Frank Adu-Poku, and Ransford Moses Ninson, among others. As Assistant Superintendent of Police (ASP), Rose Bio Atinga began her policing duties in the Tema region before being posted to the prosecution unit of the service, where she served for twelve years. She rose through the ranks, serving as the first female divisional and regional commander in Volta, Eastern, Central, and the Greater Accra regions.

Bio Atinga moved to the national headquarters as the Director-General for administration research and planning and technical of the Ghana Police Service. She was tipped by many watchers as a potential Inspector General of Police. She is currently the Director-General of research and planning of the Ghana Police Service.

== Major cases ==
Rose Bio Atinga helped in the case of the killing of one of the most notorious armed robbers in Ghana, John Kofi Fiagbedzi. She also assisted in the impounding of 380 slabs of cocaine.
