= Ankobra FM =

- Axim; Ghana
- Broadcast area: Western Region
- Frequency: 101.9 MHz

Programming
- Languages: English, French, Akan
- Format: Local news, talk and music

Links
- Website: Ankobra FM on Facebook

Ankobra FM is a privately owned radio station in Axim in the Western Region of Ghana. It was established by Kojo Armah.
