= Rita Akosua Dickson =

Ghanaian chemist

Vice-Chancellor of Kwame Nkrumah University of Science and Technology
- Incumbent
- Assumed office 1 August 2020
- Preceded by: Kwasi Obiri-Danso

Personal details
- Born: 1 August 1970 (age 56)
- Education: St. Monica's Senior High School; Wesley Girls’ High School; Kwame Nkrumah University of Science and Technology (BSc, MPharm); King's College London (PhD)
- Occupation: Academic; Pharmacist; University administrator
- Profession: Professor

Rita Akosua Dickson (born 1 August 1970) is a Ghanaian phytochemist. She is the 12th and first and only female Vice-Chancellor of the Kwame Nkrumah University of Science and Technology.

== Early life and education ==
She attended St. Monica's Secondary School in Mampong-Ashanti where she studied for her GCE Ordinary Level examinations and later Wesley Girls’ High School in Cape Coast, for her GCE Advanced Level examinations. She graduated from the Kwame Nkrumah University of Science and Technology with a bachelor's degree in pharmacy in 1994 and acquired an MPharm at the same university in pharmacognosy in 1999. She received her Ph.D. in pharmacology from King's College London in 2007.

== Career ==
Dickson began her career as a lecturer at the Kwame Nkrumah University of Science and Technology (KNUST) in the year 2000. After leaving to pursue further studies in the UK, she returned to Ghana in 2007 and continued lecturing at the Kwame Nkrumah University of Science and Technology. Prof. Dickson was promoted to senior lecturer and further to associate professor in 2009 and 2014 respectively. In September 2018, she was appointed the pro-vice chancellor of the Kwame Nkrumah University of Science and Technology, making her the first female to occupy that position. Prior to her appointment as pro-vice-chancellor, she was the dean of the faculty of pharmacy and pharmaceutical sciences. Dickson currently serves as a board member of the Pharmacy Council and Pharmaceutical Society of Ghana. On 25 June 2020, Kwame Nkrumah University of Science And Technology announced her appointment as the first female Vice Chancellor of the university effective 1 August 2020. She is to serve a four-year term.

Her work as a phytochemist covers the areas of bioactive natural products in the management of communicable and non-communicable diseases.

In June 2024, Professor Rita Akosua Dickson was granted a two-year extension as Vice-Chancellor of KNUST, following a positive review of her first term.

== Research ==
Dickson's research has been mainly about products derived from Ghanaian plants, with special emphasis on those with anti-infective, wound-healing, anti-inflammatory, antipyretic, and antidiabetic properties, based on their ethnopharmacological usage.

== Personal life ==
Dickson is married and has four daughters. She is a devout Christian.

== Achievements ==
Prof. Dickson initiated the Support One Needy Student with One Laptop Project (SONSOL) at the Kwame Nkrumah University of Science and Technology to provide laptops to financially disadvantaged but academically deserving students.

== Awards ==
Dickson was awarded a Commonwealth Scholarship to pursue a Ph.D. at King's College London, UK in 2003.

== See also ==
George Owusu Mensah
