= Aworowa =

Place in Bono East Region, Ghana

Coordinates: 7°37′N 2°01′W

- Interactive map of Aworowa
- Country: Ghana
- Region: Bono East region

Aworowa is a town in the Bono East Region of Ghana. The town is known for the Aworowa Secondary Technical School. The school is a second cycle institution.
