= Techiman North (Ghana parliament constituency) =

Constituency in the Bono East Region of Ghana

- constituency for the Parliament of Ghana
- District: Techiman Municipal District
- Region: Bono East Region of Ghana

Current constituency
- Party: National Democratic Congress
- MP: Elizabeth Ofosu-Adjare

Techiman North is one of the constituencies represented in the Parliament of Ghana. It elects one Member of Parliament (MP) by the first past the post system of election. Elizabeth Ofosu-Adjare is the member of parliament for the constituency. He was elected on the ticket of the National Democratic Congress (NDC) and won a majority of 2,139 votes to become the MP. He succeeded Oti Garko who had also represented the constituency in the 4th Republic parliament on the ticket of the National Democratic Congress (NDC)..

== See also ==
- List of Ghana Parliament constituencies
