= Evalue-Ajomoro-Gwira (Ghana parliament constituency) =

Constituency in Ghana

Evalue Gwira
- constituency for the Parliament of Ghana
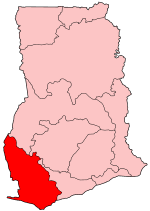
- District: Ahanta West District
- Region: Western Region of Ghana

Current constituency
- Party: National Democratic Congress
- MP: Kofi Arko Nokoe

Evalue-Ajomoro-Gwira is one of the constituencies represented in the Parliament of Ghana. It elects one Member of Parliament (MP) by the first past the post system of election. Kofi Arko Nokoe is the member of parliament for the constituency. He was elected on the ticket of the National Democratic Congress (NDC) and won a majority of 19,830 votes to become the MP. He succeeded Catherine Afeku who had become MP on the ticket of the New Patriotic Party (NPP).

== See also ==
- List of Ghana Parliament constituencies
