= Nsein Senior High School =

Location
- P. O. Box 77; Nsein-Axim Western Region; Ghana
- 4°52′00″N 2°14′27″W

Information
- Type: Public high school
- Motto: me nyamele nne me manle (My God and my country)
- Established: 1960 (66 years ago)
- Founder: Karsten Dontoh
- Status: Active
- School district: Nzema East Municipal District
- Oversight: Ministry of Education
- Gender: Co-educational
- Age: 14 to 21
- Classes offered: Agricultural science, business, general arts, general science and home economics
- Houses: 6
- Colours: Yellow and blue
- Nickname: The Nobles

Kwame Nkrumah Senior High School is a senior high school located at Nsein-Axim in the Western Region of Ghana. The school was originally known as the Osagyefo Dr Kwame Nkrumah Secondary School, then as Axim Secondary School, then to Nsein Secondary School and finally renamed Kwame Nkrumah Senior High School in 2024.

== History ==
The school is one of the schools founded by the first president of Ghana, Dr. Kwame Nkrumah, in 1960.

== Notable alumni ==
- Dr George Sipa-Yankey, former Minister for Health, Ghana
- Emmanuel Armah-Kofi Buah, former Deputy Minister of Energy, Ghana and Member of Parliament for Ellembelle

Catherine Ablema Afeku Minister of State, Ghana and Member of Parliament for Evalue Gwira

== Courses Offered ==
- General Science
- Agriculture
- Business
- General Arts
- Visual Arts
- Home Economics

== See also ==
Education in Ghana

- List of senior high schools in Ghana
