= Evalue Gwira (Ghana parliament constituency) =

Ghana parliament constituency

- constituency for the Parliament of Ghana
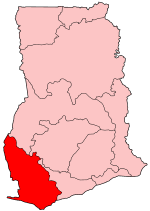
- District: Ahanta West District
- Region: Western Region of Ghana

Current constituency
- Party: National Democratic Congress
- MP: Kofi Arko Nokoe

Evalue Gwira is a Ghana parliament constituency.

== Member of Parliament ==
Kofi Arko Nokoe is the member of parliament for the constituency. He was elected on the ticket of National Democratic Congress (NDC) and won a majority of 19,830 votes to become the MP. He succeeded Catherine Abelema Afeku who had become MP on the ticket of the New Patriotic Party (NPP).

== See also ==
- List of Ghana Parliament constituencies
