= Ministry of Tourism, Arts & Culture =

Government ministry of Ghana

Ghana Tourism Authority of Ghana
- Ministry of Tourism, Arts & Culture (MoTAC) Ghana
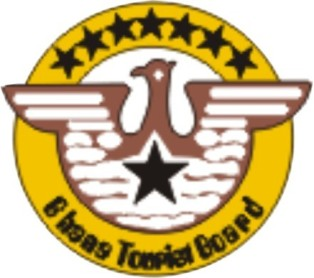

Agency overview
- Formed: 1993
- Jurisdiction: Republic of Ghana
- Headquarters: Ghana
- Ministers responsible: Ibrahim Mohammed Awal, Minister; Mark Okraku-Mantey, Deputy Minister
- Website: Official Website

The Ministry of Tourism, Culture and Creative Arts Ghana (MoTCCA) is the government ministry responsible for the development and promotion of tourism-related activities in the country.

== Functions ==
The ministry functions to develop and promote tourism and improve the capital city, Accra. These functions are aimed at optimising the socio-economic growth of the country through tourism-related activities and the promotion of environmental impact for the benefit of deprived communities with tourist sites in the country.

== Minister of Tourism ==
The ministry is headed by the Minister of Tourism. The president appoints the sector minister, who is then presented to Parliament for approval. The ministry has had a change of name to Ministry of Tourism, Culture and Creative Arts in 2013.

| Year | Minister |
|---|---|
| 2009–2010 | Juliana Azumah-Mensah (MP) |
| 2010–2011 | Zita Okaikoi |
| 2011–2012 | Akua Sena Dansua (MP) |
| 2013–2017 | Elizabeth Ofosu-Agyare |
| 2017–2019 | Catherine Afeku |
| 2019–2021 | Barbara Oteng Gyasi |
| 2021–present | Ibrahim Mohammed Awal |

== Tourism statistics ==
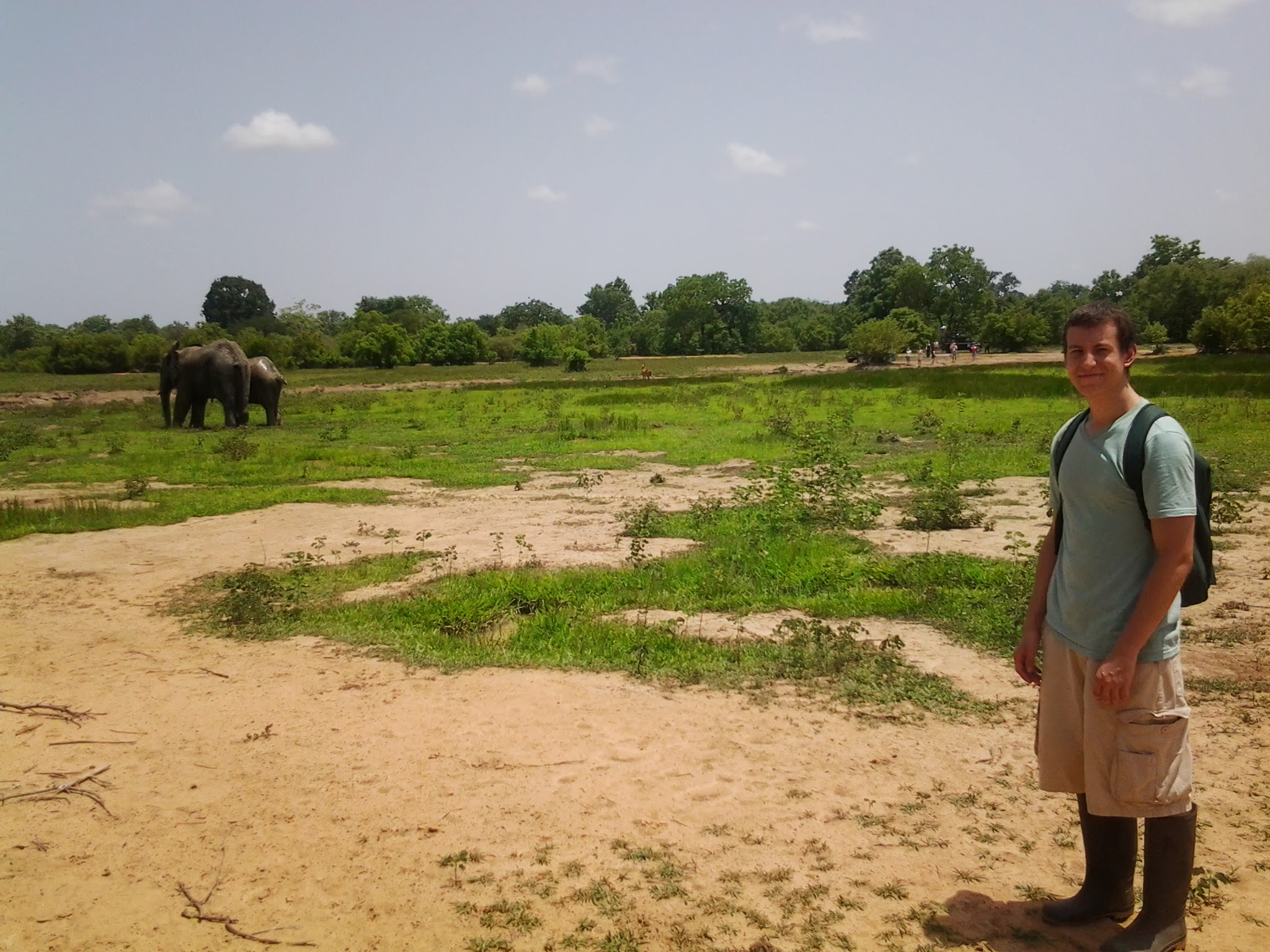
Mole National Park tourism in Ghana

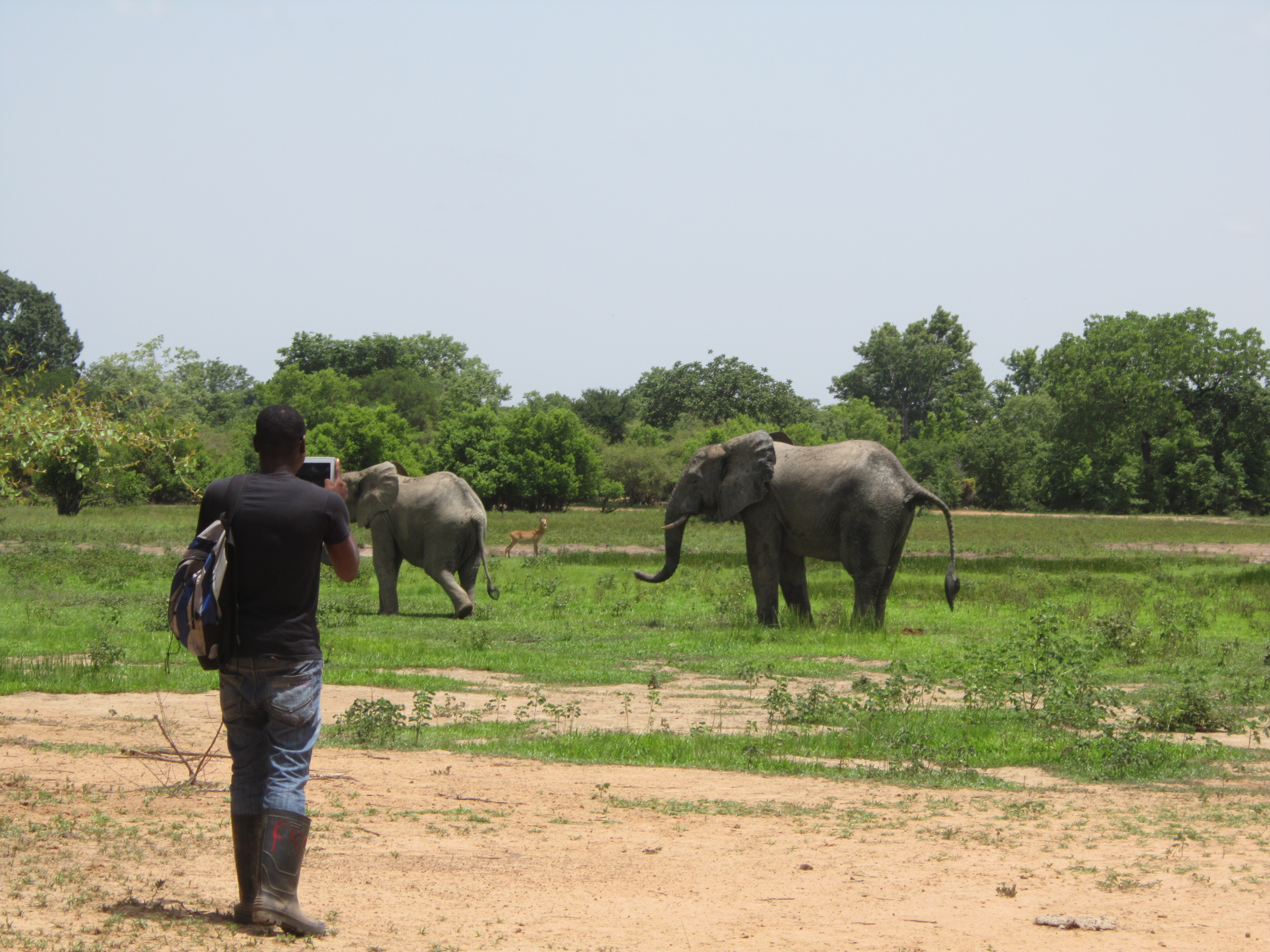
Tourist taking photo of elephants with iPad at Mole National Park in Ghana

In 2011, 1,087,000 tourists visited Ghana.

Tourist arrivals to Ghana include South Americans, Asians, Europeans. Ghana's all year round tropical warm climate along with its many varieties of wildlife; exotic waterfalls such as Kintampo Waterfalls and the largest waterfall in West Africa, Tagbo Falls; Ghana's coastal palm-lined sandy beaches; caves; mountains, rivers; meteorite impact crater and reservoirs and lakes such as Lake Bosumtwi or Bosumtwi meteorite crater and the largest lake in the world by surface area, Lake Volta; dozens of castles and forts; UNESCO World Heritage Sites; nature reserves and national parks are major tourist destinations in Ghana.

The World Economic Forum statistics in 2010 showed that Ghana was 108th out of 139 countries as the world's favourite tourism destinations. The country had moved two places up from the 2009 rankings. In 2011, Forbes magazine, published that Ghana was ranked the eleventh most friendly country in the world. The assertion was based on a survey in 2010 of a cross-section of travelers. Of all the African countries that were included in the survey, Ghana ranked highest. Tourism is the fourth-highest earner of foreign exchange for the country.

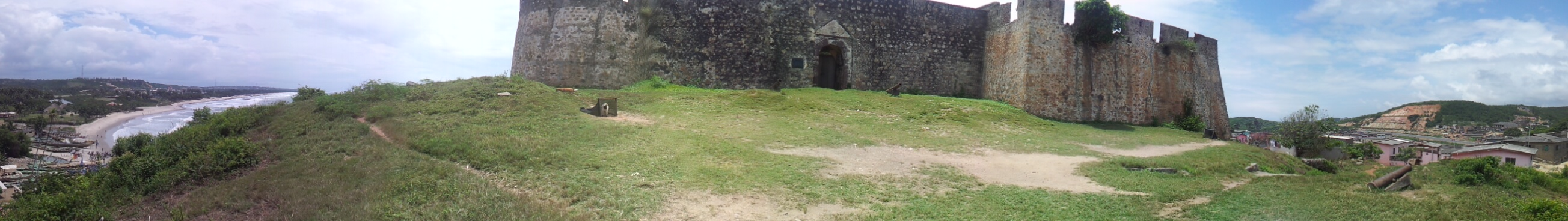
Panoramic view of Fort Amsterdam in the Central region of Ghana on the Gulf of Guinea and Atlantic Ocean

== Major tourist sites under the ministry ==
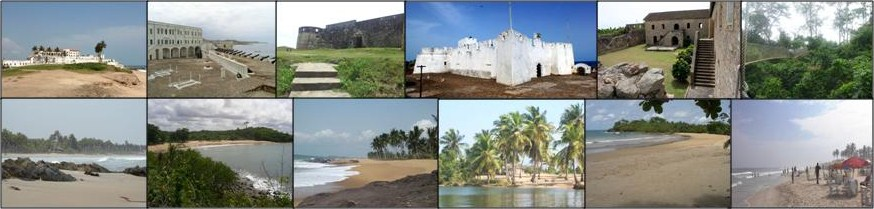
Tourism destinations in Ghana.

- Kakum National Park – National Park
- Mole National Park – National Park
- Ankasa National park – National Park
- Cape Coast Castle – UNESCO World Heritage Site
- Elmina Castle – UNESCO World Heritage Site
- Nzulezo – UNESCO World Heritage Site

== Gallery ==
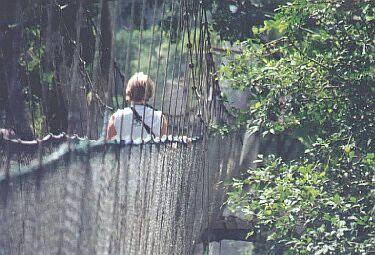
Kakum National Park – National Park

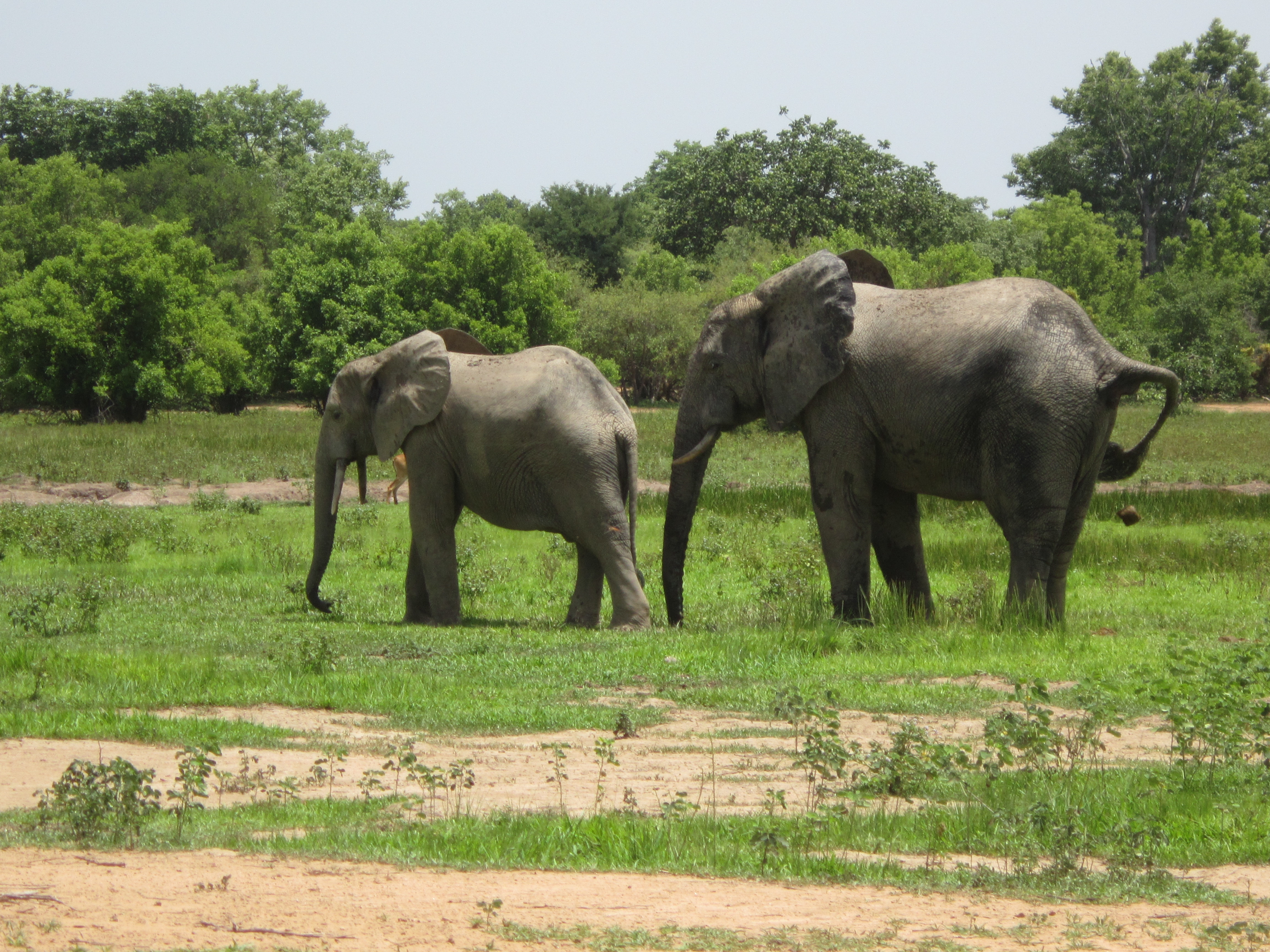
Mole National Park – National Park

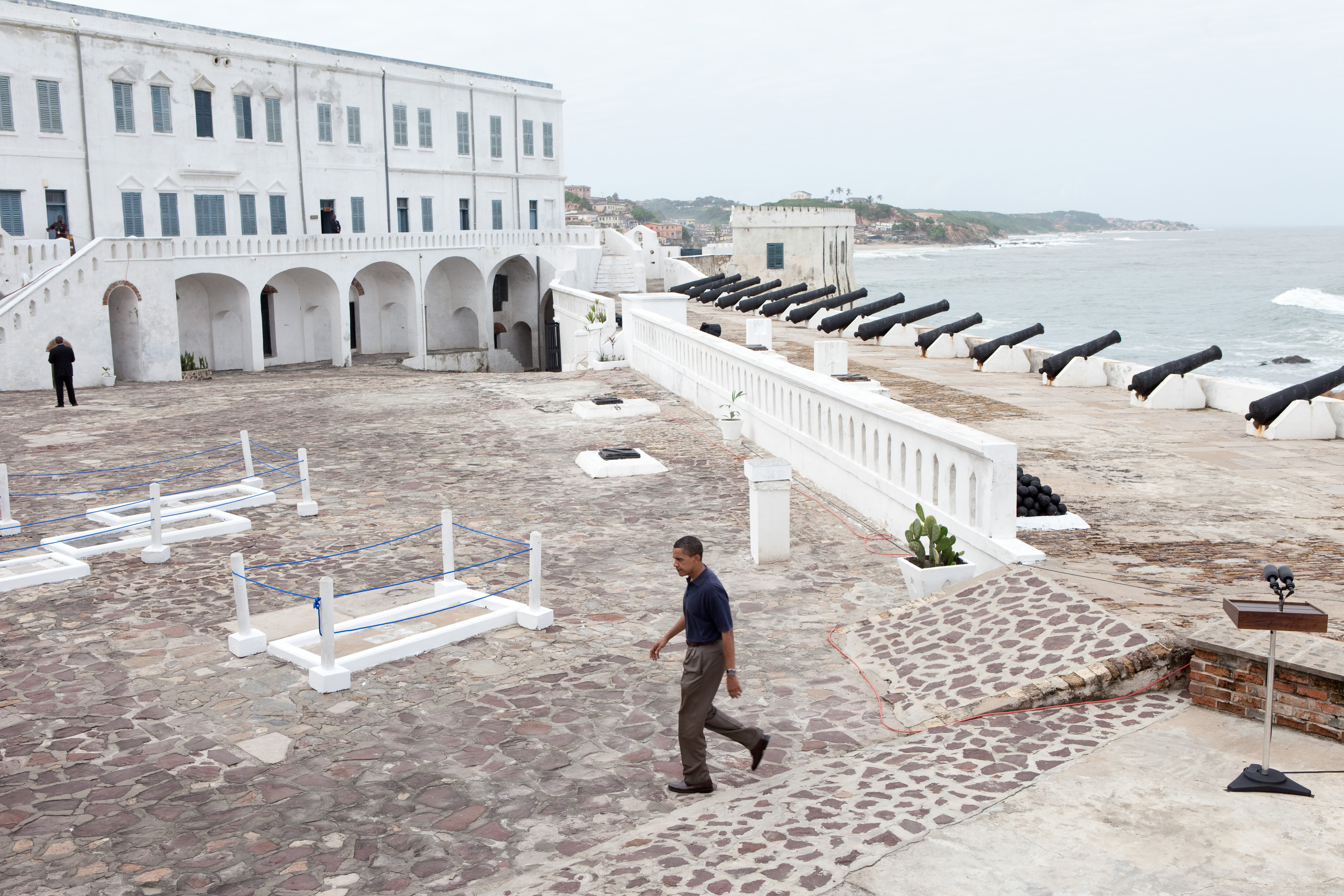
Cape Coast Castle – UNESCO World Heritage Site

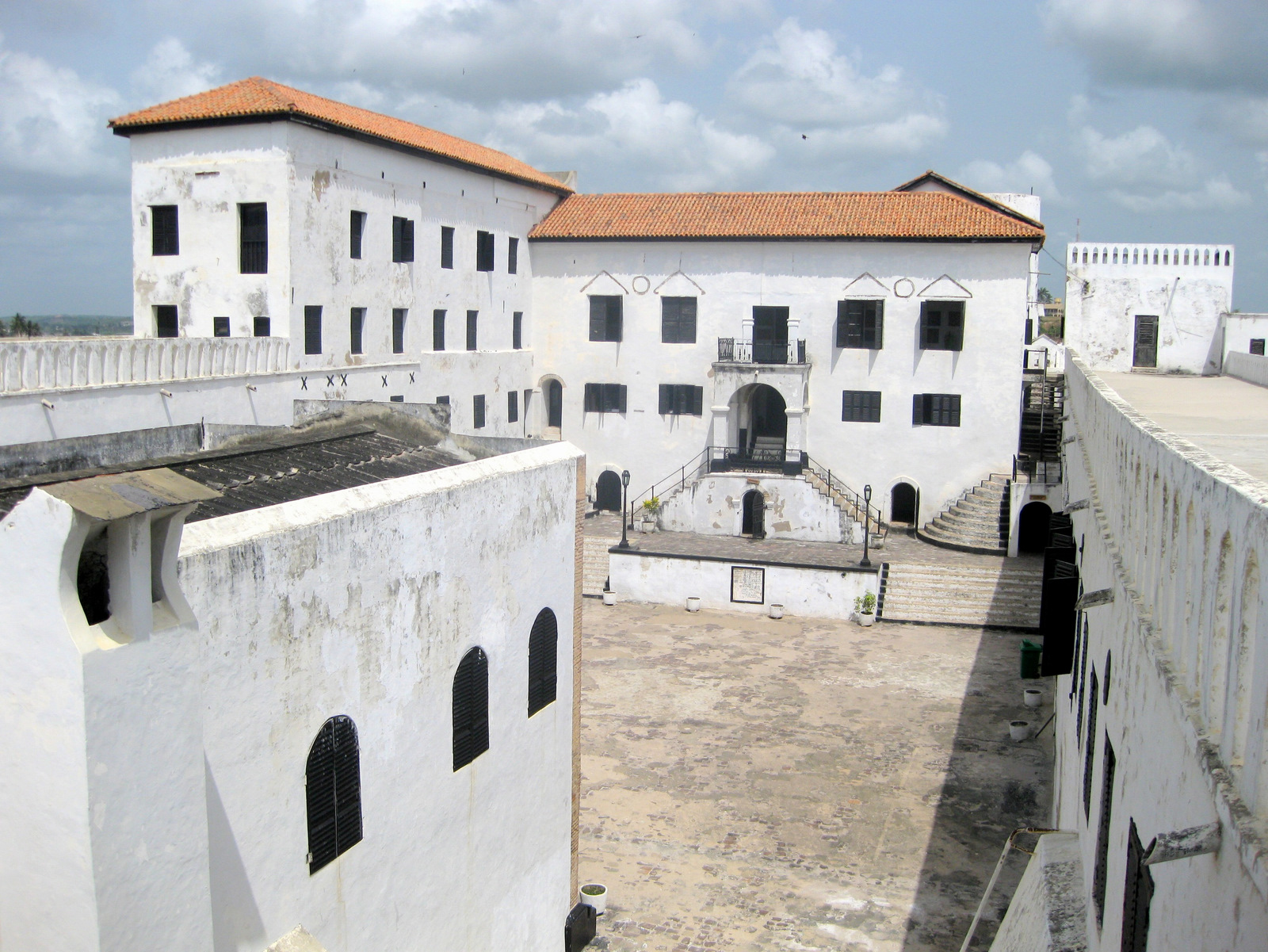
Elmina Castle – UNESCO World Heritage Site

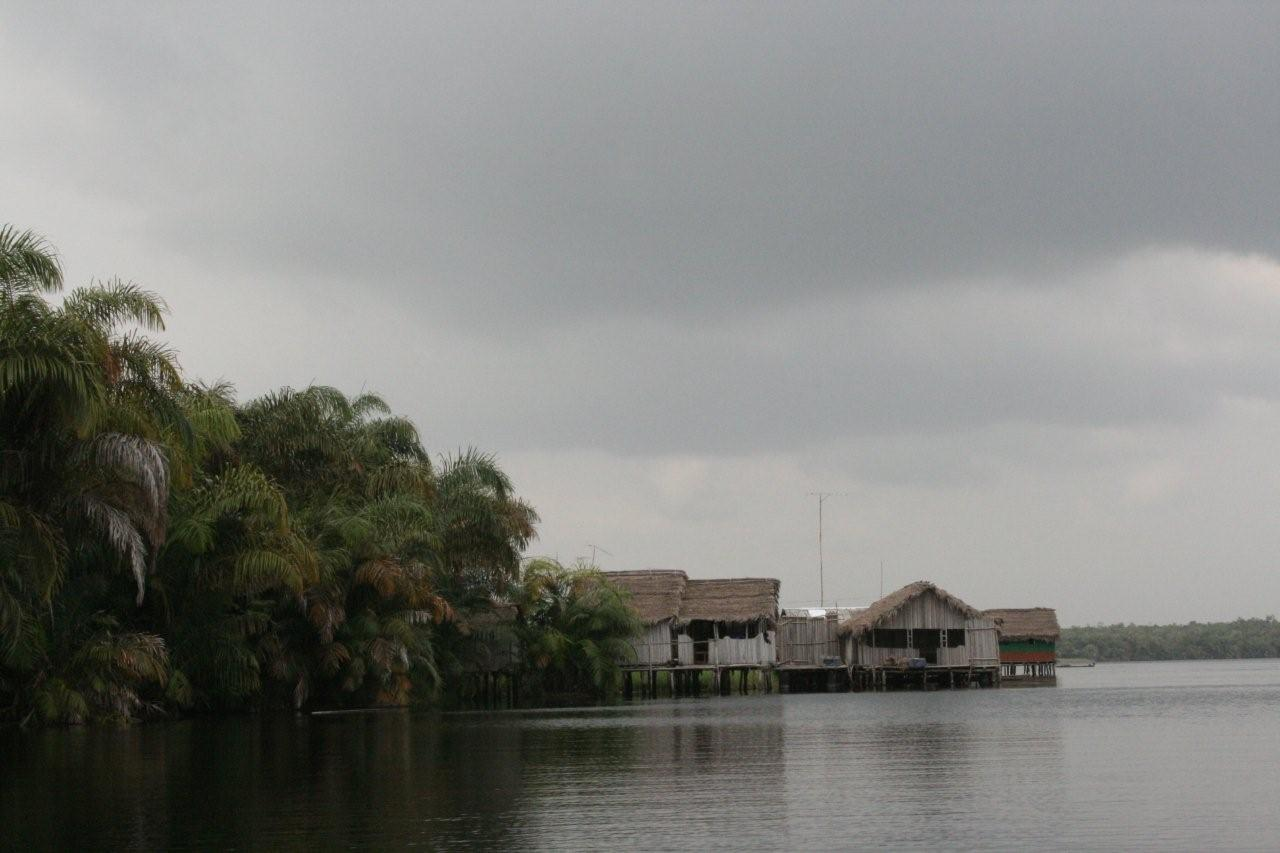
Nzulezo – UNESCO World Heritage Site

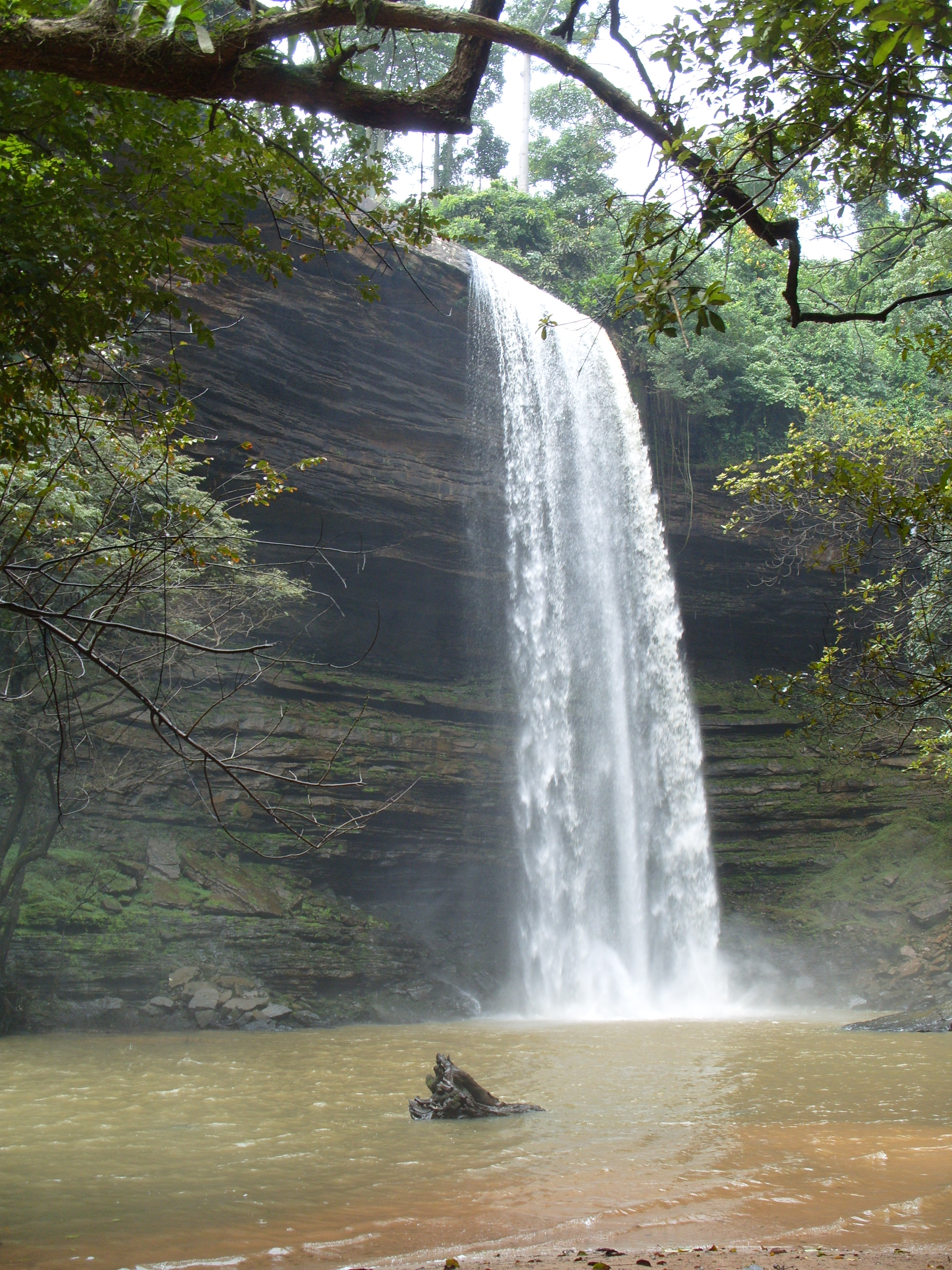
Boti Falls

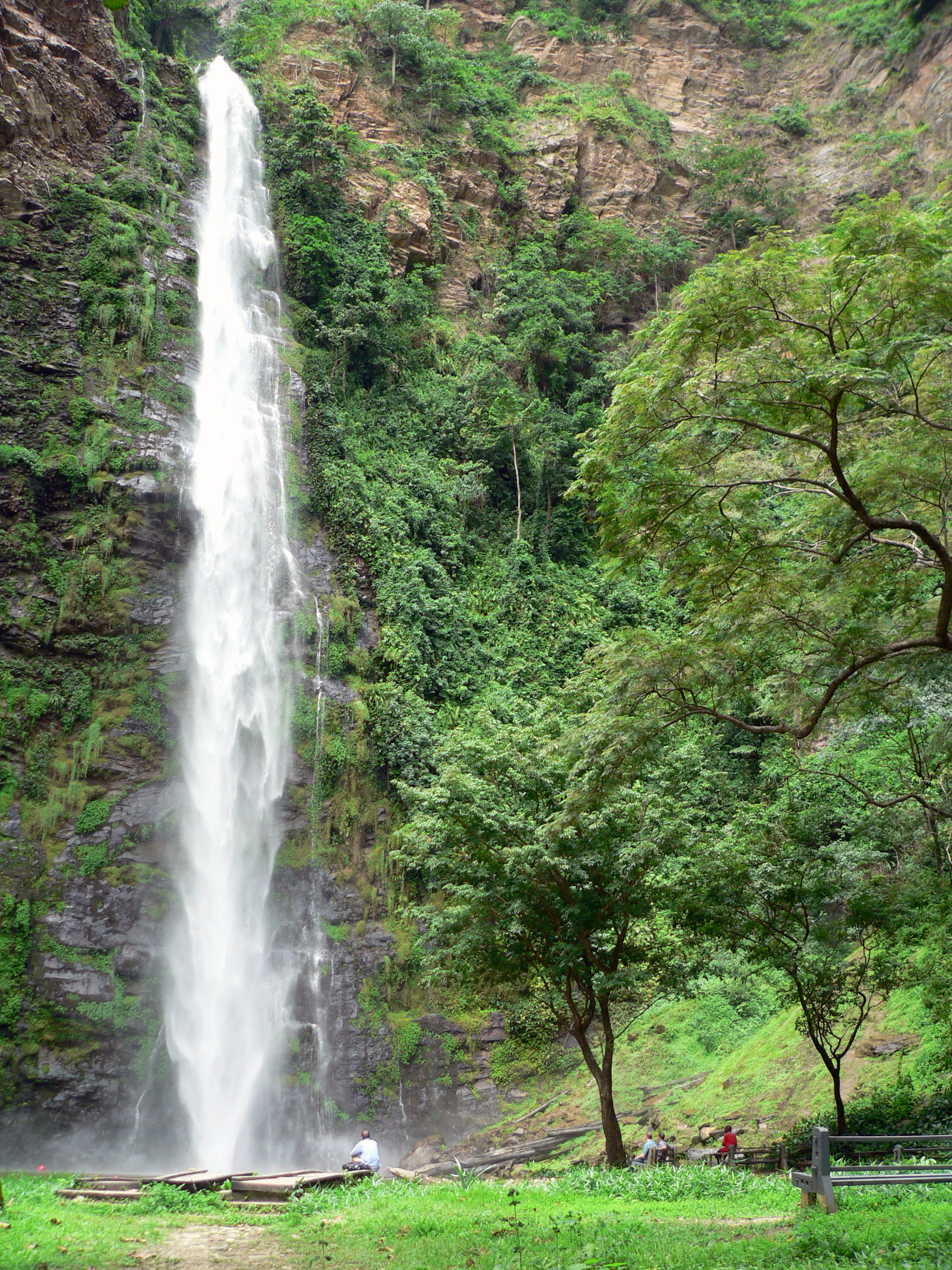
Wli Falls

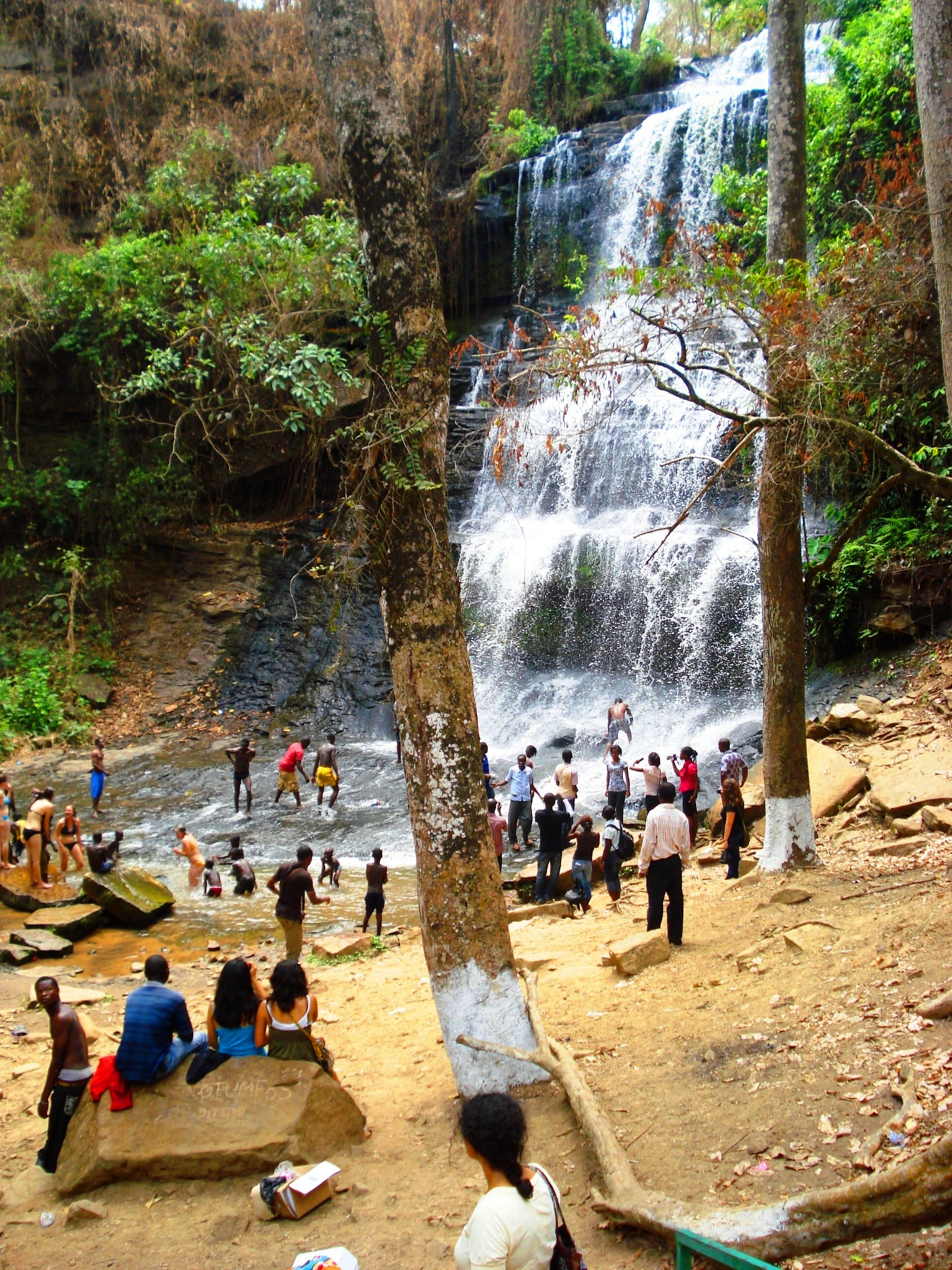
Kintampo Falls

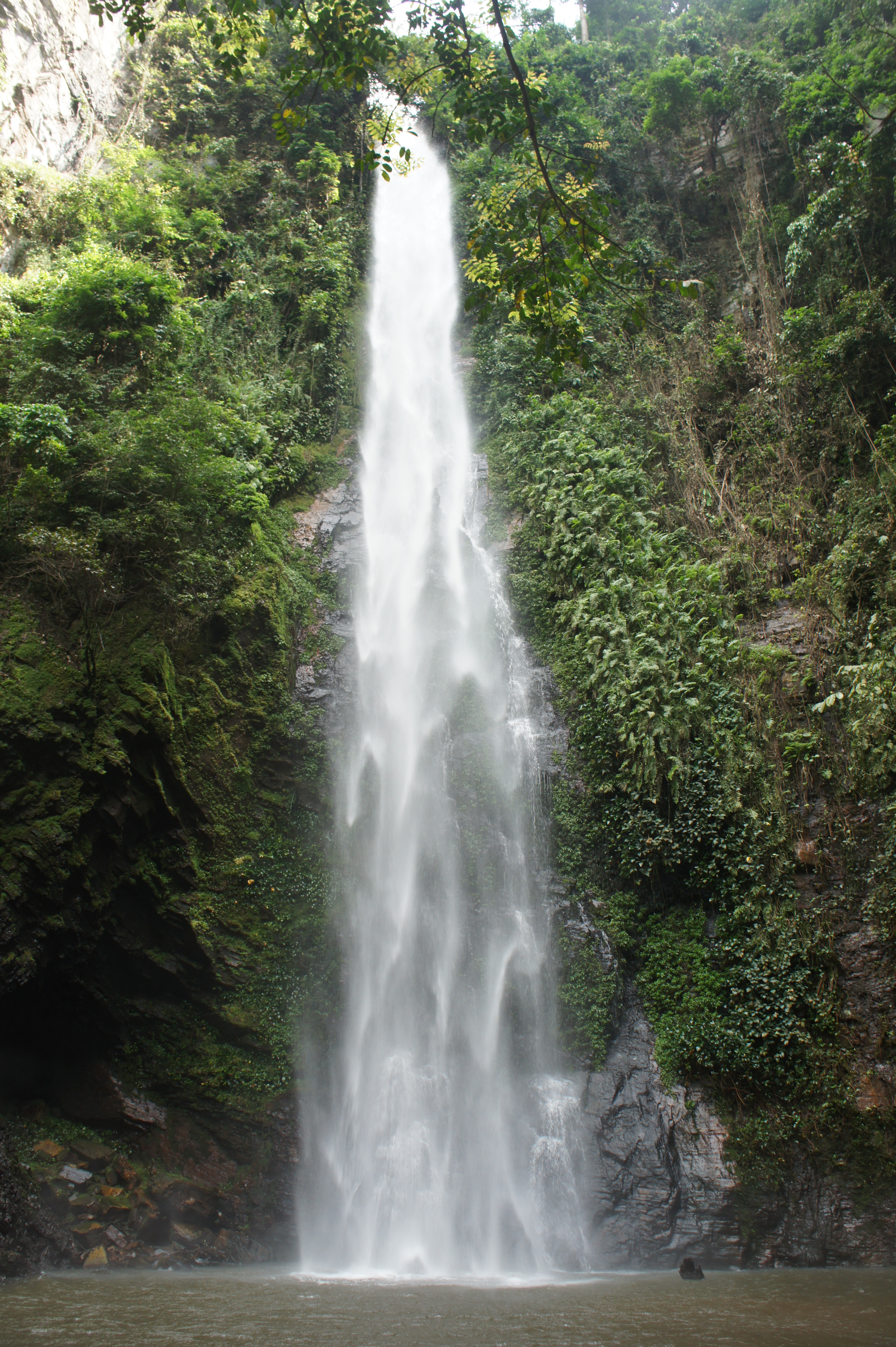
Nzulezo – Tagbo Falls

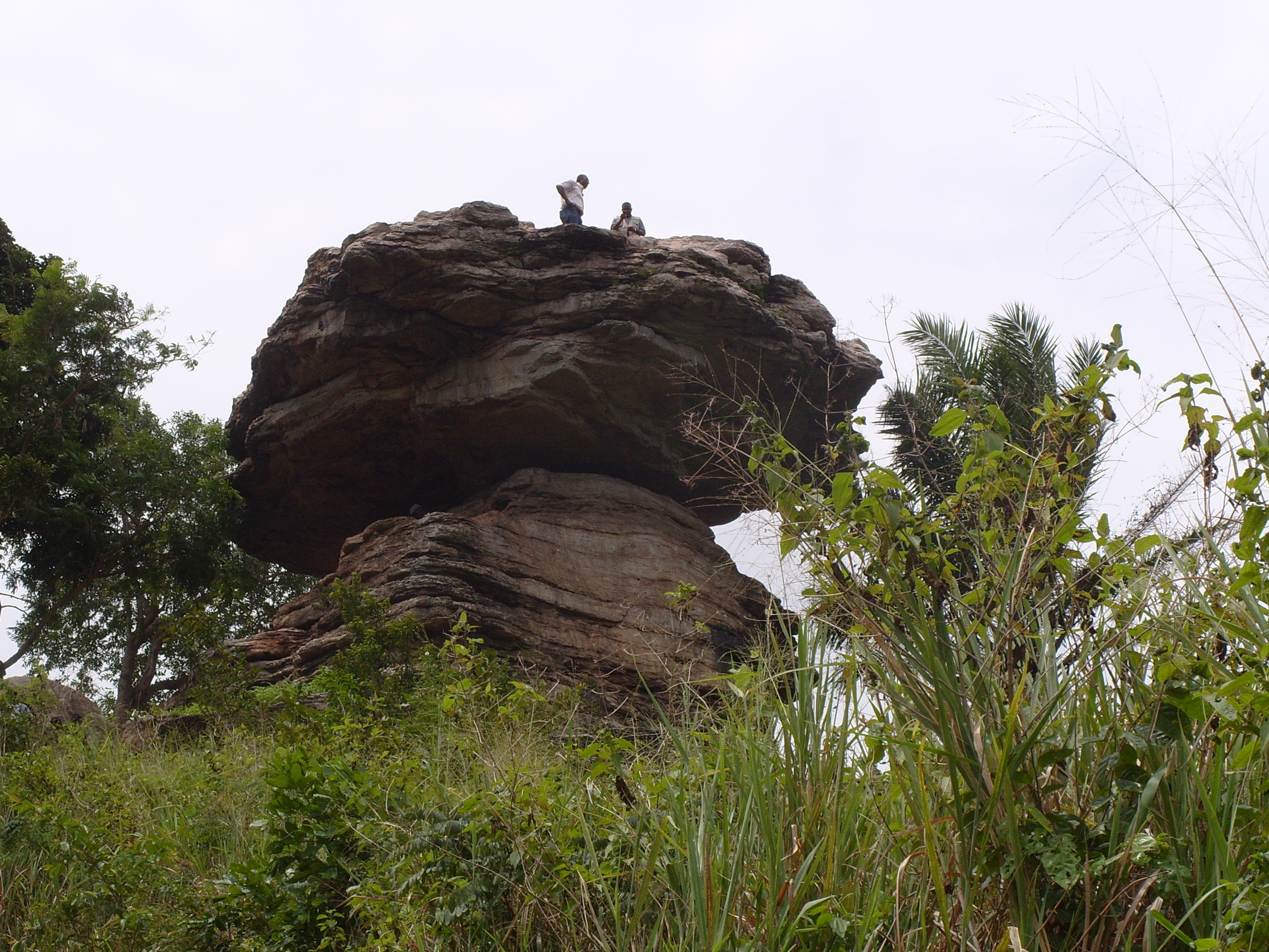
Umbrella Rock

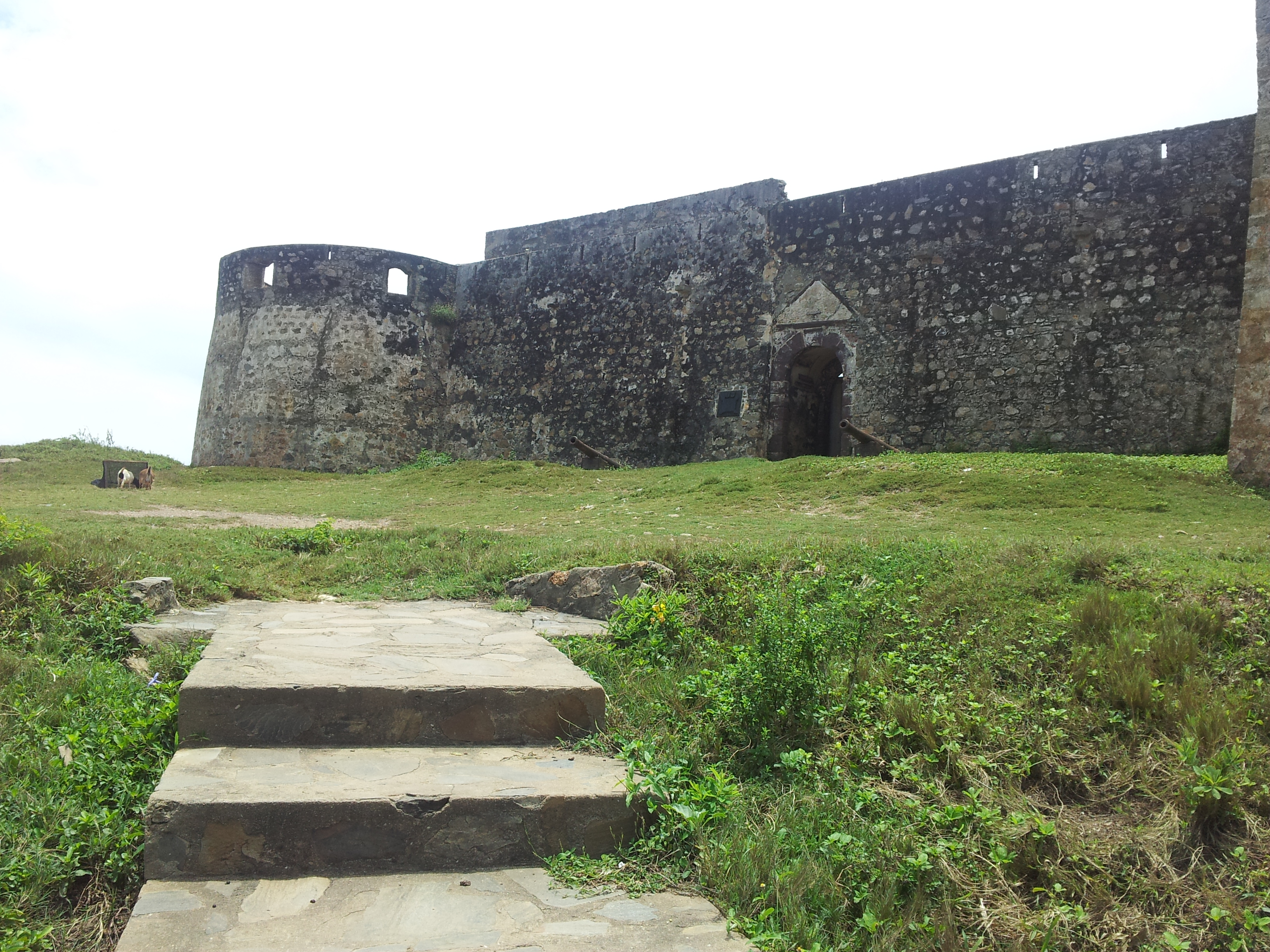
Fort Amsterdam

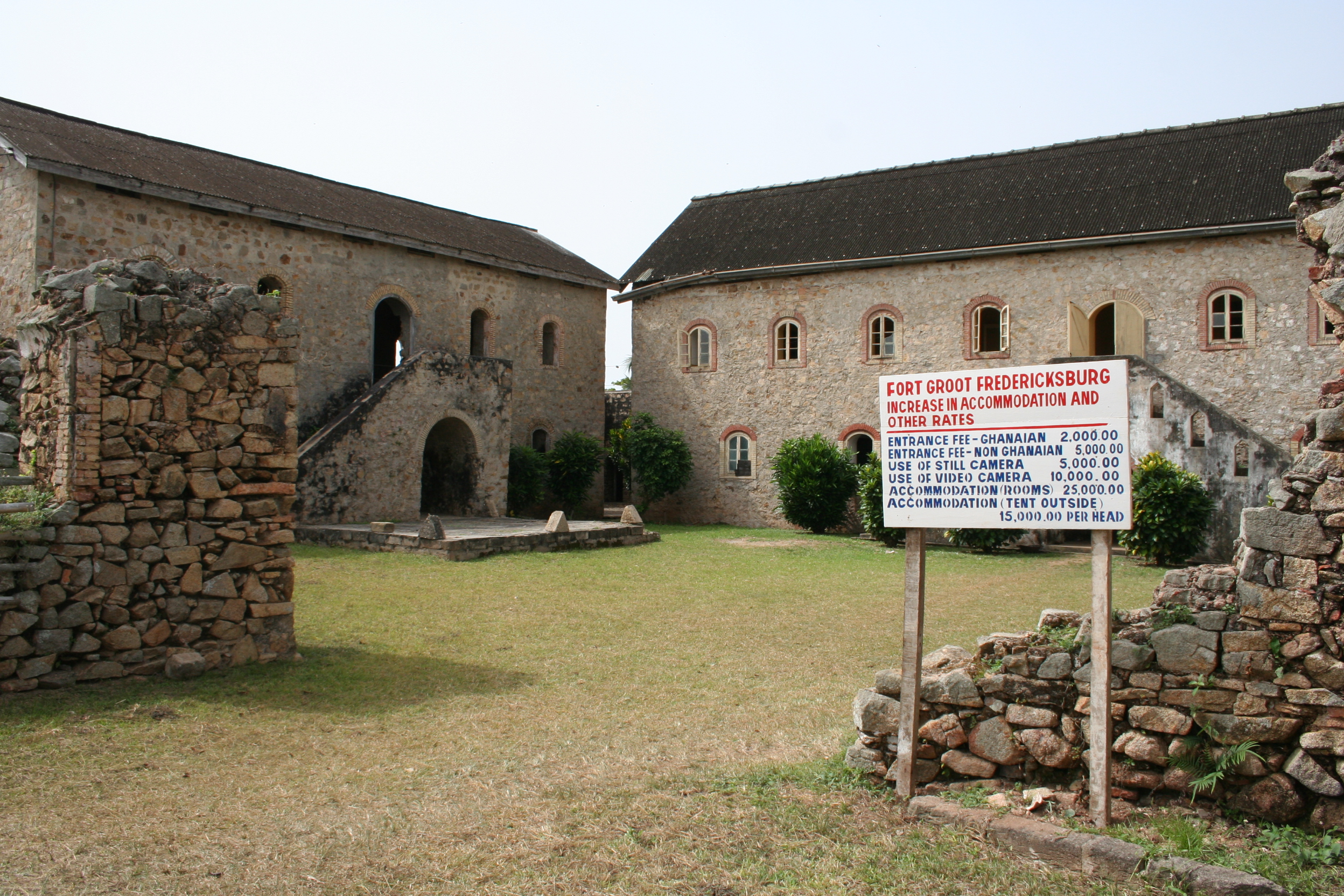
Fort Groot Fredericksburg

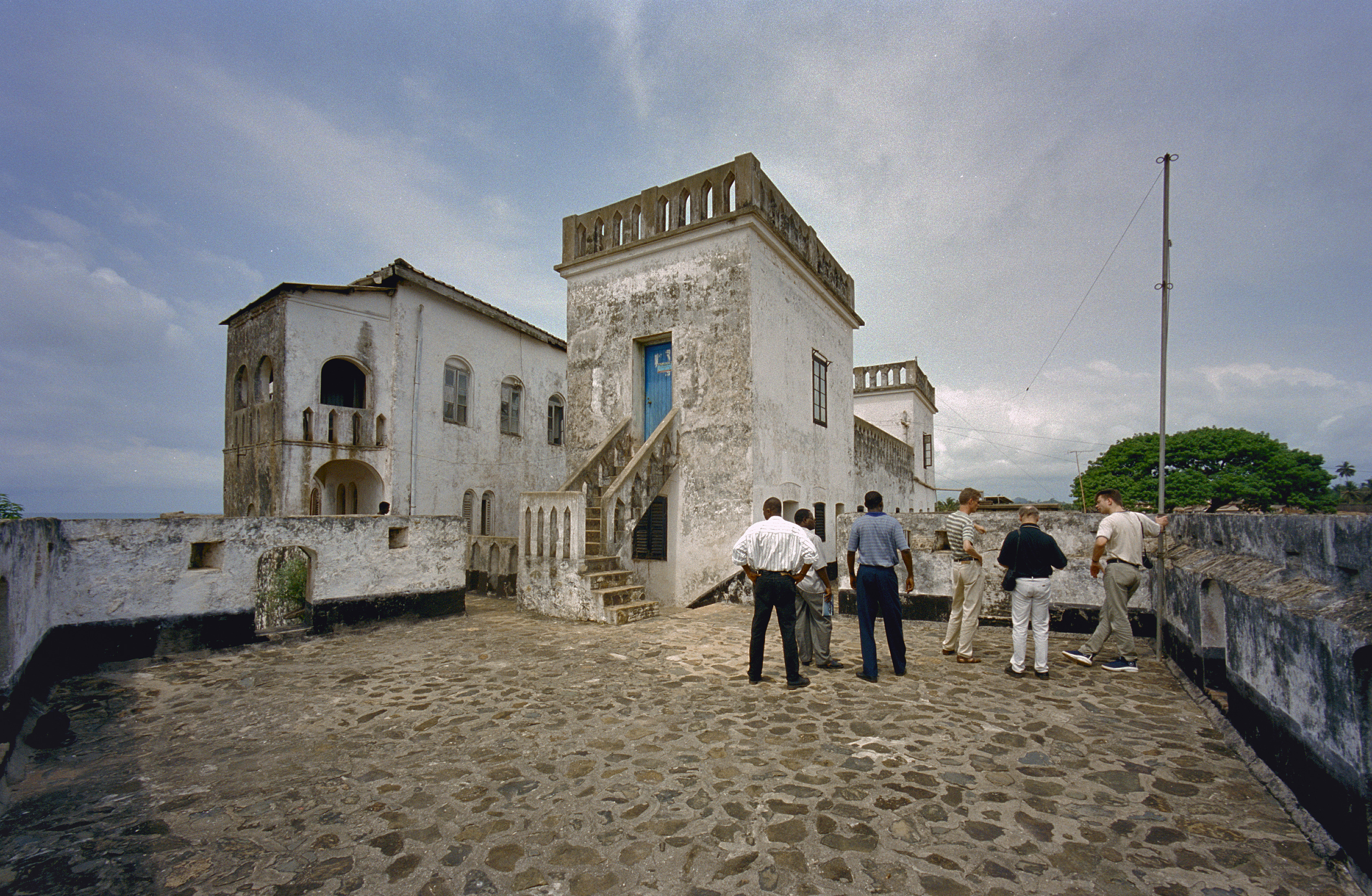
Fort Santo Antonio

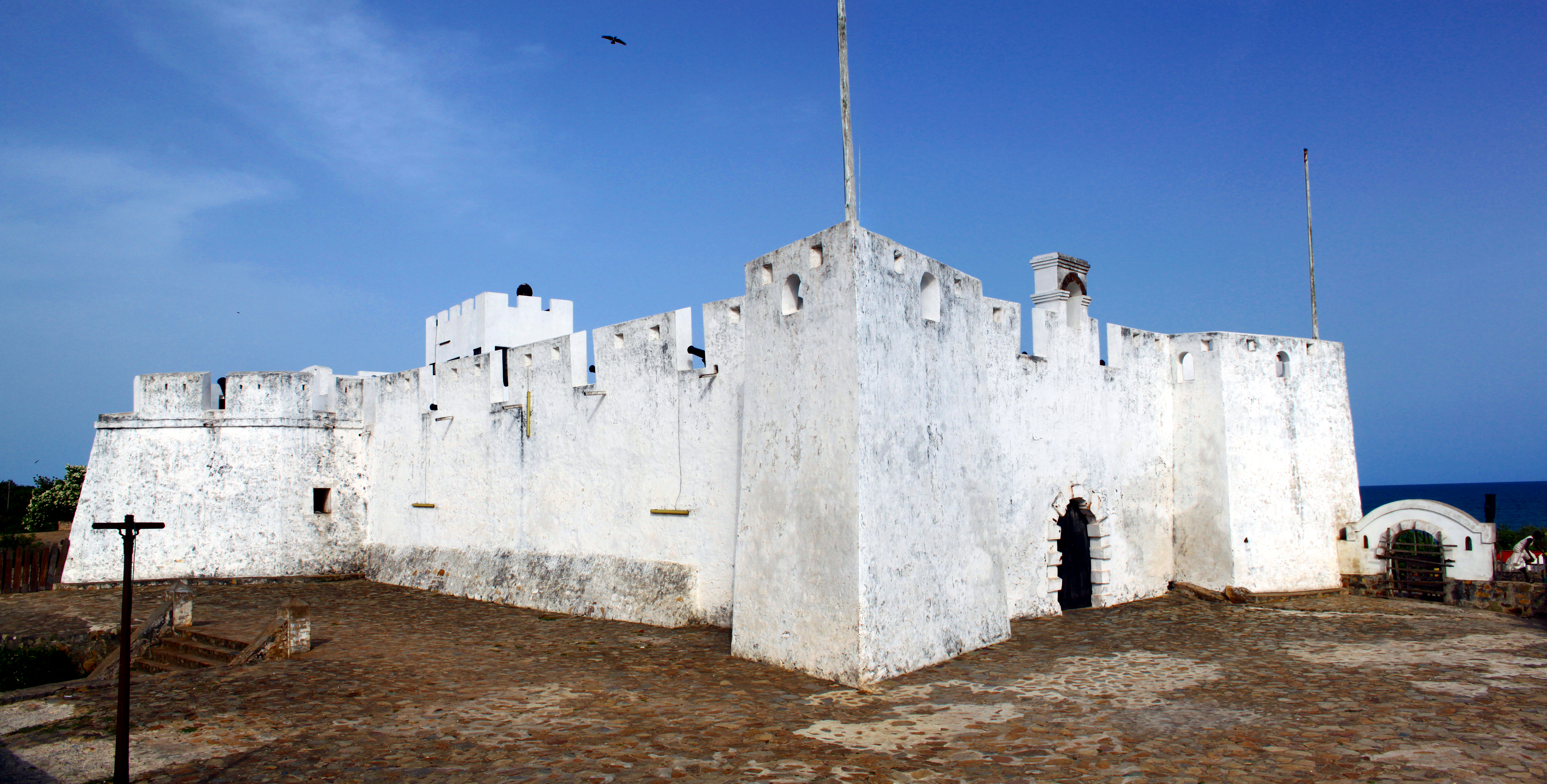
Fort Metal Cross

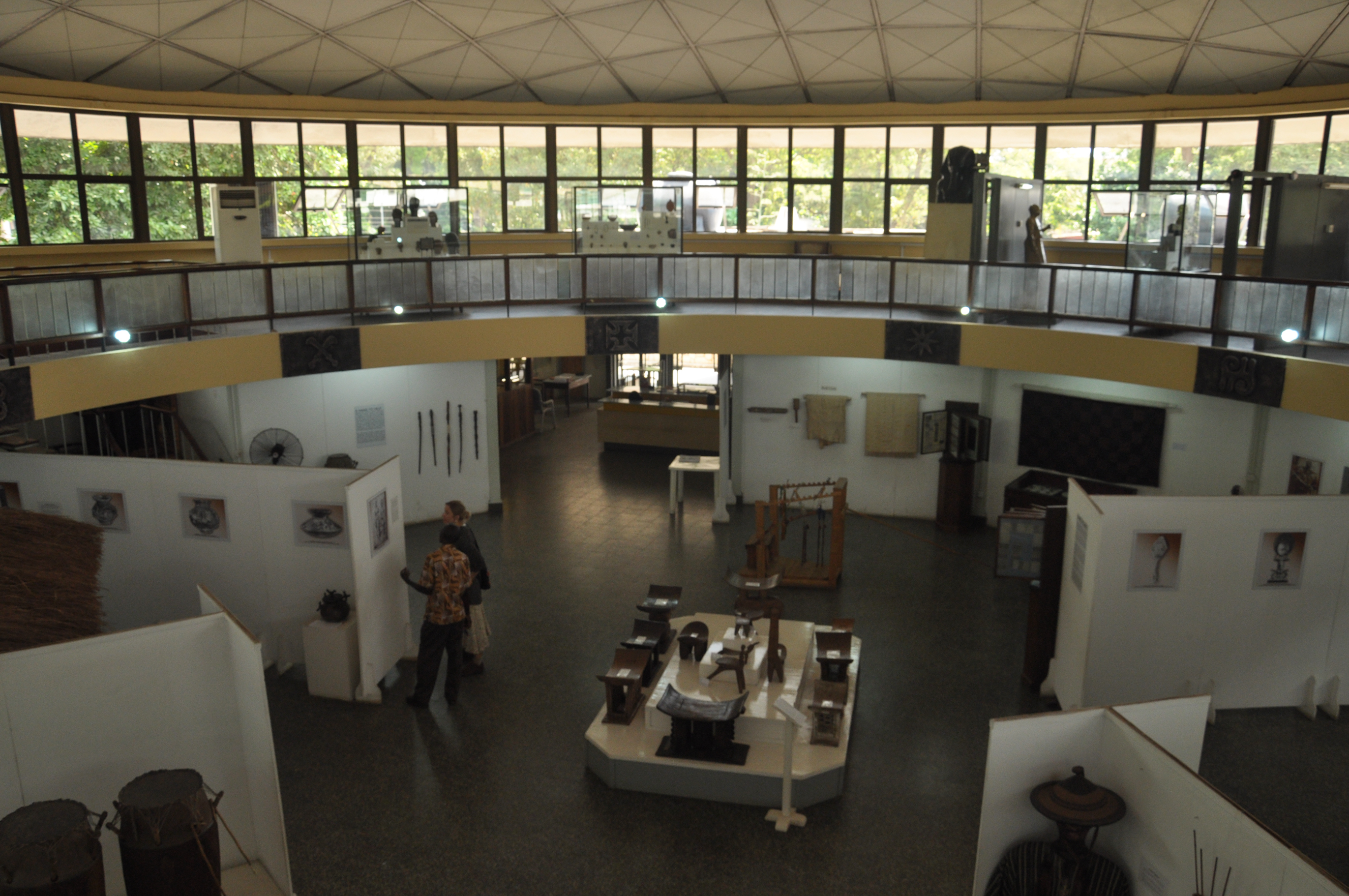
National Museum

== See also ==
- Ghana's material cultural heritage
- Tourism in Ghana
