= 2024 Ghanaian general election =

Ghanaian General Elections

- 7 December 2024
- Presidential election
- Turnout: 63.97%
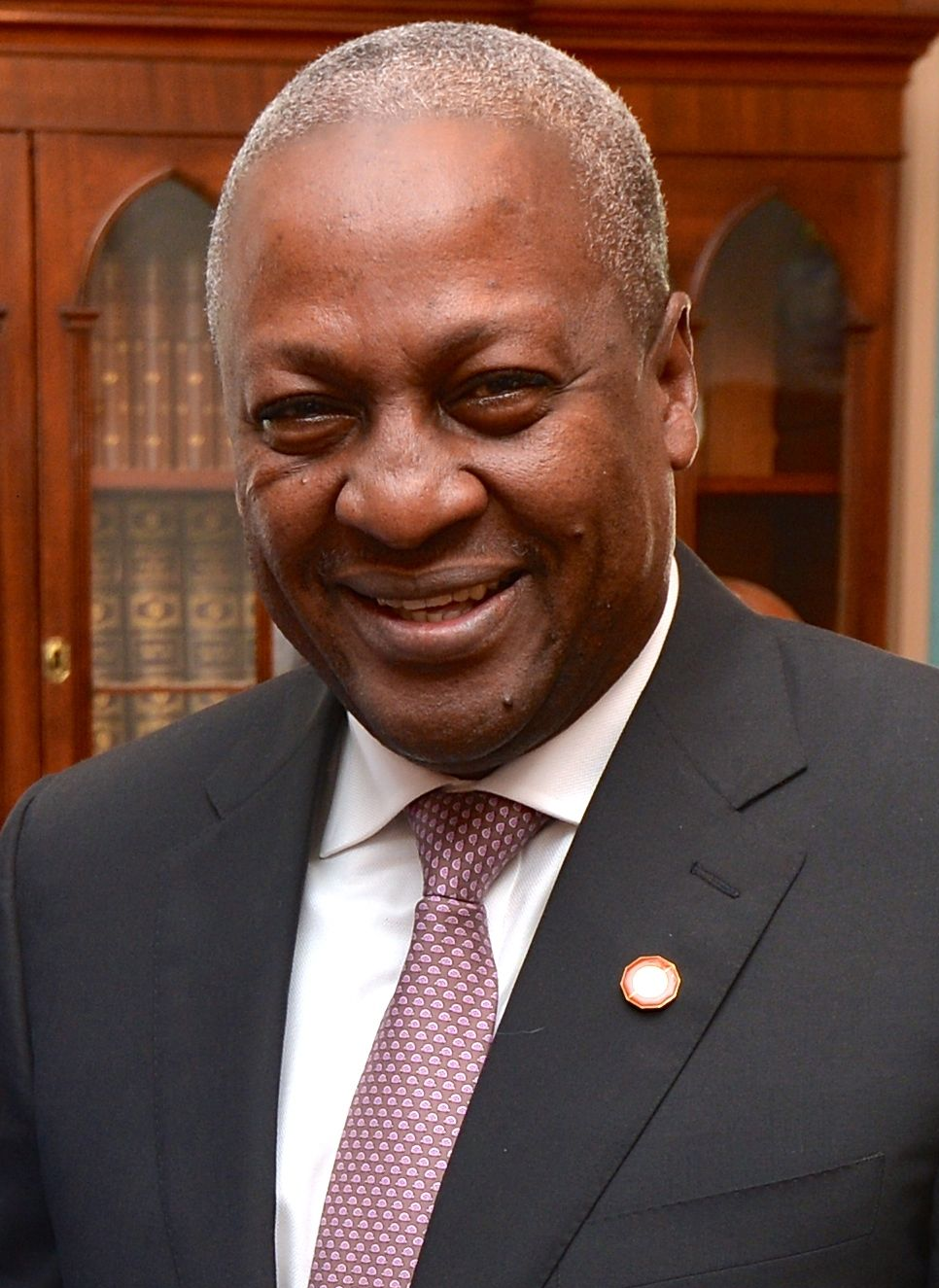

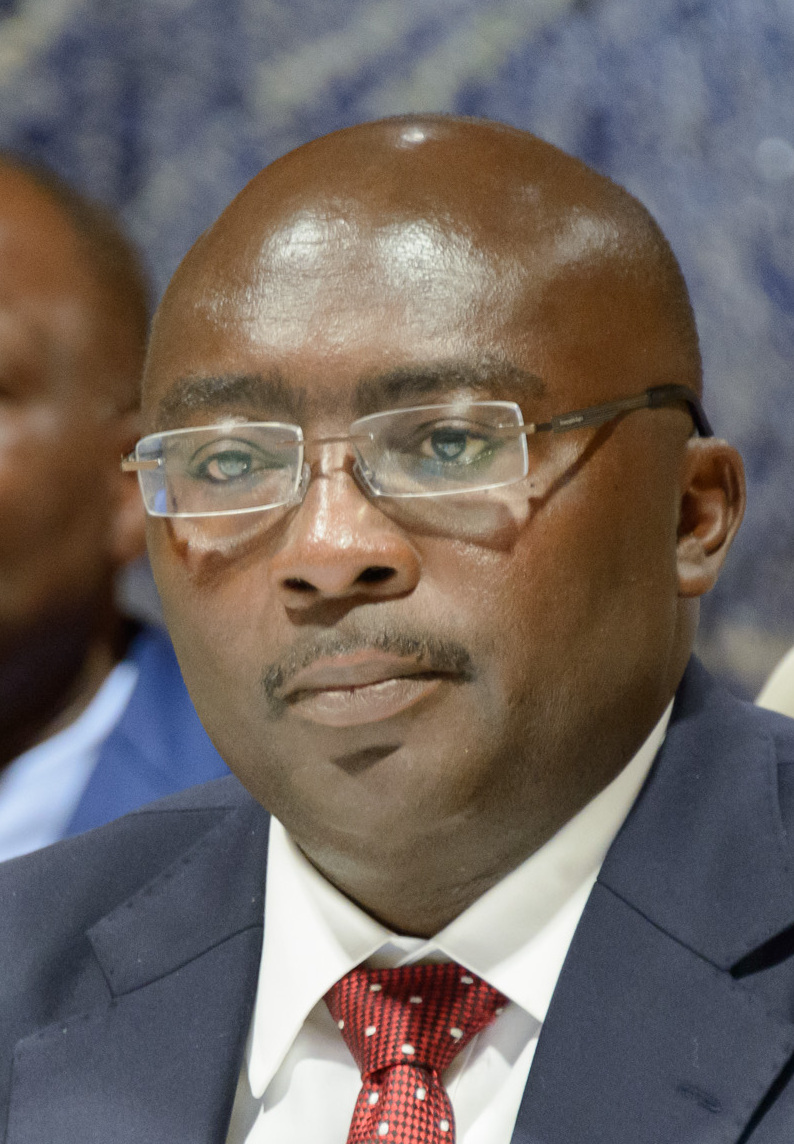
| Nominee | John Mahama | Mahamudu Bawumia |
| Party | NDC | NPP |
| Running mate | Jane Naana Opoku-Agyemang | Matthew Opoku Prempeh |
| Popular vote | 6,328,397 | 4,657,304 |
| Percentage | 56.55% | 41.61% |
- Results by region
President before election
Nana Akufo-Addo
NPP
Elected President
John Mahama
NDC
- Parliamentary election
- All 276 seats in the Parliament of Ghana; 139 seats needed for a majority
- Turnout: 64.16%
| Party | Leader | Vote % | Seats | +/– |
|---|---|---|---|---|
| NDC | John Mahama | 52.95 | 184 | +47 |
| NPP | Mahamudu Bawumia | 44.48 | 88 | −49 |
| Independents | – | 2.28 | 4 | +3 |
This lists parties that won seats. See the complete results below.
| Speaker before | Speaker after |
|---|---|
| Alban Bagbin; NDC | Alban Bagbin; NDC |

General elections were held in Ghana on 7 December 2024 to elect the president and all 276 members of Parliament. The incumbent President Nana Akufo-Addo, having completed his constitutional term limits, was ineligible for re-election.

Former President John Mahama, the National Democratic Congress (NDC) candidate, won a majority of the votes, securing victory without the need for a runoff. Mahamudu Bawumia, the ruling New Patriotic Party (NPP) candidate, conceded defeat the morning after the election. Jane Naana Opoku-Agyemang, Mahama’s running mate, made history as the first woman elected Vice President of Ghana.

In the parliamentary elections, the NDC won a landslide victory, winning 184 out of 276 seats, while the NPP secured 88 seats, with independent candidates winning four seats. The number of women elected to parliament was 40, the same as in the previous election (2020), which means that the percentage of women members of parliament in Ghana remains at 15%, a level lower than the average in the sub-region West Africa (18%), the continental African average (27%) and the global world average (also 27%).

== Electoral system ==
The President of Ghana is elected using the two-round system while members of Parliament are elected in single-member constituencies using first-past-the-post voting. Both are elected to four-year terms.

Eligible voters must be Ghanaian citizens at least 18 years old, except for those declared insane who are disenfranchised. Parliamentary candidates must be Ghanaian citizens who are at least 21 years old and either residents of a constituency or have lived there for at least five of the ten years prior to the election.

== Primary elections ==
=== New Patriotic Party ===
The ruling New Patriotic Party opened its nomination period on 26 May 2023, and closed nominations on 24 June 2023. Candidates were selected at the National Congress held on 4 November 2023. More than five candidates filed to run in the primaries when the party called for a Special Congress on 26 August. Incumbent President Akufo-Addo admonished that members of his cabinet who sought to run for president should step down from their posts to focus on their campaigns, prompting a number of resignations.

==== Presidential candidates ====
Nominee

- Mahamudu Bawumia, incumbent Vice President of Ghana

Eliminated in primary

- Francis Addai-Nimoh, former Member of Parliament for Mampong
- Owusu Afriyie Akoto, immediate former Minister for Food and Agriculture
- Kennedy Agyapong, Member of Parliament for Assin Central
- Kwabena Agyapong, former Presidential Press Secretary and General Secretary of the New Patriotic Party
- Boakye Agyarko, immediate former Minister for Energy and Petroleum
- Joe Ghartey, former Attorney General and Minister for Railways Development
- Kofi Konadu Apraku, former Minister for Regional Cooperation
- Alan Kyeremanten, immediate former Minister for Trade and Industry
- Kwadwo Poku, businessman

==== Results ====
To reduce the number of candidates, the NPP held a Special Super Delegates Congress on 26 August 2023, which would select the top five candidates who would then go on to contest in the final primaries in November. Vice President Mahamudu Bawumia placed first, with 68% of the votes. To the surprise of many observers, "maverick" MP Kennedy Agyapong, running a campaign largely critical of the Akufo-Addo administration, placed second, edging out NPP veteran Alan John Kyeremanten, who first ran for President in 2008. Owusu Afriyie Akoto placed fourth, while Francis Addai-Nimoh and Boakye Agyarko tied for fifth place, necessitating a run-off, which Addai-Nimoh won, rounding out the five final candidates for the primaries. However, Kyeremanten announced that he would withdraw from the primaries (later leaving the NPP entirely and launching his own third-party campaign), leaving four candidates.

| Candidate | Votes | % |
|---|---|---|
| Mahamudu Bawumia | 629 | 68.37 |
| Kennedy Agyapong | 132 | 14.35 |
| Alan Kyeremanten | 95 | 10.33 |
| Owusu Afriyie Akoto | 36 | 3.91 |
| Francis Addai-Nimoh | 9 | 0.98 |
| Boakye Agyarko | 9 | 0.98 |
| Kwabena Agyapong | 6 | 0.65 |
| Kwadwo Poku | 4 | 0.43 |
| Kofi Konadu Apraku | 0 | 0.00 |
| Total | 920 | 100.00 |

The NPP held its primaries on 4 November 2023. Bawumia again won by a wide margin, confirming him as the NPP's nominee for the 2024 elections, although Kennedy Agyapong's performance was also impressive as he secured a stronger second-place finish compared to his showing at the Super Delegates' Congress.

| Candidate | Votes | % |
|---|---|---|
| Mahamudu Bawumia | 118,210 | 61.43 |
| Kennedy Agyapong | 71,991 | 37.41 |
| Owusu Afriyie Akoto | 1,459 | 0.76 |
| Francis Addai-Nimoh | 781 | 0.41 |
| Total | 192,441 | 100.00 |

=== National Democratic Congress ===
The opposition National Democratic Congress opened its nomination period on 22 February 2023 and closed nominations on 22 March 2023. Candidates were required to pay a GH₵500,000 filing fee and a GH₵30,000 nomination fee, women and persons living with disabilities were eligible for a 50% discount. The NDC selected its candidate on 13 May 2023.

==== Presidential candidates ====
Nominee

- John Mahama, former President of Ghana (2012–2017)

Eliminated in primary

- Kojo Bonsu, former mayor of Kumasi
- Kwabena Duffuor, former governor of the Bank of Ghana and Minister for Finance and Economic Planning
- Ernest Kobeah, businessman

==== Results ====
The NDC primary was held on 13 May 2023. Kobeah dropped out on 29 March and Duffuor dropped out the day before the election, claiming irregularities in the organization of the polls, leaving two candidates. Former President Mahama won nomination in an overwhelming landslide, winning nearly 99% of the vote, setting the stage for the fourth consecutive election in which he would be the NDC's flag-bearer. Bonsu called Mahama to concede and offer his support.

| Candidate | Votes | % |
|---|---|---|
| John Mahama | 297,603 | 98.94 |
| Kojo Bonsu | 3,181 | 1.06 |
| Total | 300,784 | 100.00 |

In June 2024, the NDC accused the electoral commission of colluding with the ruling NPP to rig the elections via an illegal voter transfer scheme, which the NDC claimed was orchestrated by Yohane Amarh Ashitey, the NPP Parliamentary Candidate and the Tema Metropolitan Chief Executive.

=== Other parties ===
==== Movement For Change ====
On 25 September 2023, Alan John Kyeremanten formed the Movement For Change party to aspire for the 2024 Ghanaian general election as an independent presidential candidate for the presidential race after resigning from New Patriotic Party (NPP). Therefore he will be a presidential candidate for the 2024 Ghanaian general election.

==== The New Force ====
On 7 January 2024, real estate developer Nana Kwame Bediako announced that he would run as the candidate for the New Force movement. This followed weeks of speculation during which the New Force teased its fielding of a "masked" candidate, who was widely expected to be Cheddar. The announcement, which was due to take place at Black Star Square, was postponed after the presidential administration pulled the permit for the rally, citing "an unforeseen state event".

=== Ghana Freedom Party ===
Akua Donkor's Ghana Freedom Party, having been disqualified in the 2012 Ghanaian general election and 2016 Ghanaian general election and contesting in the 2020 Ghanaian general election submitted their form on 12 September to officially contest in the 2024 election. However, on 28 September, it was announced that the party's founder and flag bearer had passed on, leaving a controversial void as to the way forward with the Electoral Commission of Ghana halting ballot printing.

On 4 November, the party's leadership announced the nomination of Kwabena Agyeman Appiah Kubi popularly known as Roman Fada as its new presidential candidate. The party will not contest in the election due to the disqualification of Philip Appiah Kubi who was nominated as replacement for Akua Donkor after her death.

== Opinion polls ==
| Polling firm | Fieldwork Date | Mahama | Bawumia | Kyerematen | Lord | Bediako | Others | Margin of error | Sample size | Lead |
|---|---|---|---|---|---|---|---|---|---|---|
| Economist Intelligence Unit | 15 May 2023 | Win | | | | | | | | |
| Office of the President | 17 September 2024 | 46.3% | 46.3% | | | | | ±1.55% | 25,000 | |
| Global InfoAnalytics | 20 - 28 September 2024 | 51.1% | 30.8% | 4.1% | 6.5% | 6.2% | 1.3% | ±2.49% | 8,206 | 13.8% |
| SBM Intelligence | September 2024 | 11 regions | 5 regions | | | | | ±2.45% | 1,700 | |
| Afroopinion | September - November 2024 | 48.5% | 39.4% | | | 12.1 | 0 | 8% | 500 | |
| Fitch Solutions | 18 November 2024 | Win | | | | | | | | |
| Smart Sarpong | 21 November 2024 | 45.8% | 49.1% | | | | | | | |

== Filing of nomination papers ==
Thirty-nine candidates from 12 political parties and 27 independent candidates indicated their intention to contest the 2024 presidential election. They collected nomination forms from the Electoral Commission. The filing of nomination papers started on 9 September 2024. At the close of nominations on 13 September 2024, 24 of the candidates had successfully filed their nomination papers with the Commission. Twelve candidates submitted forms as representatives of political parties and the other 12 were independent candidates. Two candidates submitted their forms after the 13 September deadline. The Electoral Commission received the forms but is yet to announce the fate of the two candidates.

Initial list of Presidential candidates
| Number | Party | Presidential candidate | Date / Form submitted | Notes |
|---|---|---|---|---|
| 1 | All People's Congress | Hassan Ayariga | 9 September 2024 | Contested 2020 election |
| 2 | Convention People's Party | Nana Frimpomaa Sarpong Kumankumah | 12 September 2024 | |
| 3 | Great Consolidated Popular Party | Daniel Augustus Lartey | | Submitted |
| 4 | Ghana Freedom Party | Akua Donkor | 12 September 2024 | Contested 2020 election |
| 5 | Ghana Union Movement | Christian Kwabena Andrews | 9 September 2024 | Contested 2020 election |
| 6 | Liberal Party of Ghana | Percival Kofi Akpaloo | 9 September 2024 | Contested 2020 election |
| 7 | National Democratic Congress | John Mahama | 9 September 2024 | President of Ghana (2012 - 2016) Contested 2020 election |
| 8 | National Democratic Party | Mohammed Frimpong | | Submitted |
| 9 | New Patriotic Party | Mahamudu Bawumia | 9 September 2024 | Vice President of Ghana (2016 - 2024) Vice Presidential candidate in 2020 |
| 10 | People's National Convention | ^{a}Bernard Mornah | | Submitted |
| 11 | Progressive Alliance for Ghana | ^{a}John Enyonam Kwakwu Kpikpi | | Submitted |
| 12 | Progressive People's Party | ^{a}Kofi Asamoah Siaw | | Forms were submitted late Vice Presidential candidate in 2020 |
| 13 | Independent | Muhammad Abdullah | | Not submitted |
| 14 | Independent | ^{a}Desmond Abrefa | | Submitted |
| 15 | Independent | ^{a}Nana Stephens Adjepong | | Submitted |
| 16 | Independent | Seth Ntim Agyarko | | Not submitted |
| 17 | Independent | T. K. Amenya | | Not submitted |
| 18 | Independent | Wilberforce Andrews | | Not submitted |
| 19 | Independent | ^{a}Sam Sarpong Ankrah | | Submitted |
| 20 | Independent | ^{a}Samuel Apea-Danquah | 9 September 2024 | |
| 21 | Independent | Kenneth Kwame Asamoah | | Not submitted |
| 22 | Independent | Tom Asiseh | | Not submitted |
| 23 | Independent | Stephen Atubiga | | Not submitted |
| 24 | Independent | Agnes Ayisha | | Forgot to fill forms |
| 25 | Independent | Nana Kwame Bediako | 9 September 2024 | |
| 26 | Independent | ^{a}Nii Amu Darko | | Submitted |
| 27 | Independent | Nana Ohene Aggrey Bentsil Djan | | Not submitted |
| 28 | Independent | Tawiah N. Hemans | | Not submitted |
| 29 | Independent | Kofi Koranteng | | Submitted |
| 30 | Independent | Alan John Kyerematen | 11 September 2024 | |
| 31 | Independent | ^{a}Janet Asana Nabla | 12 September 2024 | |
| 32 | Independent | Isaac Wiafe Ofori | | Not submitted |
| 33 | Independent | ^{a}James Kwasi Oppong | | Submitted |
| 34 | Independent | ^{a}Paul Perkoh | | Submitted |
| 35 | Independent | Robert Roy Reindorf | | Not submitted |
| 36 | Independent | Richard Sumah | | Not submitted |
| 37 | Independent | George Twum-Barima-Adu | 9 September 2024 | |
| 38 | Independent | Samuel Worlanyo | | Not submitted |
| 39 | Independent | Jacob Osei Yeboah | | Not submitted |

^a – Disqualified by the Electoral Commission of Ghana

== Final list of presidential candidates ==
On 20 September 2024, the Electoral Commission released the final list of candidates who would be on the ballot for the presidential election. Thirteen of the 24 applicants made the final list while 11 were disqualified. The disqualifications were based on the candidates not having fulfilled all the requirements or discrepancies noticed on their forms. Nine of the 12 candidates of political parties and four of the 12 independent candidates made the final list. Candidates of the People's National Convention (PNC), Progressive Alliance for Ghana (PAG) and the Progressive People's Party (PPP) were not listed. The order of candidates on the ballot paper was determined by a ballot conducted by the Electoral Commission on 20 September 2024.

On 28 October 2024, Akua Donkor, the presidential candidate for the Ghana Freedom Party, died after a sudden illness. The GFP was given ten days to nominate a replacement for Akua Donkor. They submitted forms for Philip Appiah-Kubi who was her running mate. The Electoral Commission found that the forms submitted had irregularities and as the GFP could not correct them promptly, they were disqualified from presenting a candidate for the Presidential election. The Commission however went ahead with printing the ballot papers citing inadequate time and to reduce costs if they had to start all over again.

Final list of Presidential candidates
| Number | Party | Abbreviation | Presidential Candidate | Running Mate |
|---|---|---|---|---|
| 1 | New Patriotic Party | NPP | Mahamudu Bawumia | Matthew Opoku Prempeh |
| 2 | Great Consolidated Popular Party | GCPP | Daniel Augustus Lartey | |
| 3 | Ghana Freedom Party | GFP | Akua Donkor (died on October 28th) | Kwabena Agyeman Appiah Kubi |
| 4 | Ghana Union Movement | GUM | Christian Kwabena Andrews | Evelyn Serwaa Bonsu |
| 5 | Liberal Party of Ghana | LPG | Kofi Akpaloo | Elizabeth Sam |
| 6 | National Democratic Party | NDP | Mohammed Frimpong | Christiana Collingwood Williams |
| 7 | Convention People's Party | CPP | Nana Frimpomaa Sarpong Kumankumah | Wayoe Ghanamannti |
| 8 | National Democratic Congress | NDC | John Dramani Mahama | Jane Naana Opoku-Agyemang |
| 9 | All People's Congress | APC | Hassan Abdulai Ayariga | Samuel Mensah |
| 10 | Independent | | Kofi Koranteng | Emmanuel Semordzi |
| 11 | Independent | | George Twum-Barima-Adu | Nyaaba-Aweeba Azongo |
| 12 | Independent | | Nana Kwame Bediako | Maryam Esaka Kriesie |
| 13 | Independent | | Alan John Kwadwo Kyerematen | Kwame Owusu Danso |
Source:Graphic Online NB: Listed in same order as on the ballot papers

- Ballot paper position and numbers for the presidential elections will remain unchanged despite the death of Akua Donkor and subsequent disqualification of Philip Appiah Kubi.

== Election observers ==
- Commonwealth election observers
- ECOWAS
- African Union
- Coalition of Domestic Election Observers (CODEO)

== Results ==
Turnout was relatively low at 60.9% (approximately 18.8 million votes), a sharp drop from the 79% turnout in the 2020 election. The National Democratic Congress saw a significant victory, winning both the office of President and a majority of parliamentary seats, ending eight years of power for the NPP.

In nine constituencies, political party supporters showed up en masse to collation centers and caused damage to election materials, delaying presidential and parliamentary results from those locations. Margins in the presidential race were large enough for an official winner to be declared prior to reporting from these constituencies.

=== President ===
Former president John Mahama (NDC) won with 57% of the vote. Mahamudu Bawumia conceded defeat on 8 December, congratulating Mahama on his victory. The results were officially certified on 9 December.

Jane Naana Opoku-Agyemang, became the nation's first female vice president when she was sworn in with Mahama on 7 January 2025.

| Candidate | Running mate | Party | Votes | % |
|---|---|---|---|---|
| John Mahama | Jane Naana Opoku-Agyemang | National Democratic Congress | 6,328,397 | 56.55 |
| Mahamudu Bawumia | Matthew Opoku Prempeh | New Patriotic Party | 4,657,304 | 41.61 |
| Nana Kwame Bediako | Maryam Esaka Kriesie | Independent (The New Force) | 84,478 | 0.75 |
| Alan John Kyerematen | Kwame Owusu Danso | Independent (Movement for Change) | 31,202 | 0.28 |
| Nana Akosua Frimpomaa | Wayoe Ghanamannti | Convention People's Party | 23,397 | 0.21 |
| Hassan Ayariga | Samuel Mensah | All People's Congress | 17,461 | 0.16 |
| Dan Lartey Jr. | | Great Consolidated Popular Party | 16,673 | 0.15 |
| Christian Kwabena Andrews | Evelyn Serwaa Bonsu | Ghana Union Movement | 16,461 | 0.15 |
| Kofi Akpaloo | Elizabeth Sam | Liberal Party of Ghana | 5,219 | 0.05 |
| Mohammed Frimpong | Christiana Collingwood Williams | National Democratic Party | 4,413 | 0.04 |
| Kofi Koranteng | Emmanuel Semordzi | Independent | 3,320 | 0.03 |
| George Twum-Barima-Adu | Nyaaba-Aweeba Azongo | Independent | 3,097 | 0.03 |
| Akua Donkor (deceased) | Kwabena Agyeman Appiah Kubi | Ghana Freedom Party | 0 | 0.00 |
| Total | | | 11,191,422 | 100.00 |
| Valid votes | | | 11,191,422 | 97.91 |
| Invalid/blank votes | | | 239,109 | 2.09 |
| Total votes | | | 11,430,531 | 100.00 |
| Registered voters/turnout | | | 18,774,195 | 60.88 |
Source: Electoral Commission of Ghana

==== By region ====
| Region | Mahama NDC | Bawumia NPP | Bediako IND | Kyerematen IND | Frimpomaa CPP | Ayariga APC | Lartey GCPP | Andrews GUM | Akpaloo LPG | Frimpong NDP | Koranteng IND | T.-B.-Adu IND | Rejected |
|---|---|---|---|---|---|---|---|---|---|---|---|---|---|
| Ahafo | 130,106 | 113,851 | 1,731 | 441 | 349 | 367 | 357 | 221 | 70 | 56 | 39 | 27 | 4,900 |
| Ashanti | 697,076 | 1,366,800 | 23,432 | 8,763 | 2,651 | 2,077 | 1,608 | 2,317 | 524 | 278 | 252 | 330 | 29,865 |
| Bono | 235,681 | 192,773 | 5,549 | 832 | 880 | 776 | 636 | 719 | 174 | 271 | 96 | 99 | 10,471 |
| Bono East | 216,691 | 124,811 | 1,374 | 665 | 889 | 708 | 730 | 614 | 179 | 131 | 138 | 110 | 10,965 |
| Central | 562,620 | 382,749 | 9,090 | 2,417 | 2,118 | 1,318 | 1,457 | 2,305 | 489 | 286 | 367 | 335 | 26,926 |
| Eastern | 453,234 | 493,234 | 6,910 | 1851 | 1544 | 1118 | 1244 | 1507 | 344 | 365 | 315 | 219 | 21,477 |
| Greater Accra | 1,260,832 | 681,535 | 19,630 | 6,289 | 2,975 | 2,102 | 758 | 1,773 | 401 | 223 | 290 | 271 | 22,707 |
| Northern | 529,456 | 370,928 | 1,305 | 2,624 | 2,154 | 2,125 | 2,825 | 991 | 719 | 444 | 604 | 547 | 23,424 |
| North East | 111,051 | 134,800 | 203 | 569 | 396 | 354 | 1,026 | 245 | 266 | 155 | 132 | 154 | 9,036 |
| Oti | 182,470 | 86,489 | 455 | 620 | 970 | 499 | 532 | 380 | 282 | 111 | 87 | 75 | 8,526 |
| Savannah | 134,563 | 56,774 | 256 | 882 | 621 | 511 | 569 | 341 | 163 | 219 | 105 | 105 | 6,972 |
| Upper East | 361,597 | 106,700 | 743 | 1,110 | 1,436 | 2,202 | 1,856 | 547 | 486 | 387 | 247 | 215 | 16,999 |
| Upper West | 242,852 | 89,906 | 613 | 919 | 1,605 | 801 | 1,251 | 556 | 293 | 239 | 294 | 219 | 9,467 |
| Volta | 584,234 | 56,699 | 1,542 | 1,136 | 1,586 | 929 | 366 | 372 | 370 | 929 | 93 | 98 | 9,777 |
| Western | 423,245 | 275,231 | 9,922 | 1,643 | 2,281 | 995 | 912 | 2,946 | 324 | 199 | 168 | 201 | 17,654 |
| Western North | 202,689 | 124,024 | 1,723 | 441 | 942 | 579 | 546 | 627 | 135 | 120 | 93 | 92 | 9,943 |
| Total | 6,328,397 | 4,657,304 | 84,478 | 31,202 | 23,397 | 17,461 | 16,673 | 16,461 | 5,219 | 4,413 | 3,320 | 3,097 | 239,109 |

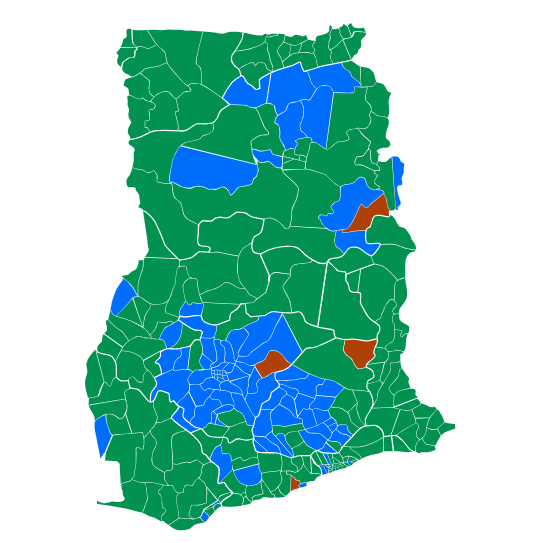

=== Parliament ===
A total of 801 people contested for the 276 seats in parliament. Preliminary results show that the National Democratic Congress won a two-thirds majority of the nation's 276 parliamentary seats. Parliamentary control before the election was with the New Patriotic Party, with 137 seats held by each of the two largest parties and one independent caucusing with the NPP. On 13 December, the Deputy Chairperson of the Electoral Commission announced that the results of 12 constituencies needed re-collation but only three had been completed and these were results for Suhum, Akwatia and Fanteakwa North. The results for Ablekuma North, Dome-Kwabenya, Okaikwei Central, Tema Central, all in the Greater Accra region were yet to be collated. In the Ashanti Region, results were still pending for Ahafo Ano North, Ahafo Ano South West, Obuasi East. In the Bono East Region results were still pending for Techiman South. Nsawam-Adoagyiri, a ninth constituency in the Eastern Region is also pending.

| Party | Votes | % | Seats |
|---|---|---|---|
| National Democratic Congress | 6,258,144 | 52.95 | 184 |
| New Patriotic Party | 5,257,506 | 44.48 | 88 |
| People's National Convention | 8,501 | 0.07 | 0 |
| Liberal Party of Ghana | 6,903 | 0.06 | 0 |
| Progressive People's Party | 5,890 | 0.05 | 0 |
| Convention People's Party | 4,375 | 0.04 | 0 |
| National Democratic Party | 2,316 | 0.02 | 0 |
| Ghana Union Movement | 2,054 | 0.02 | 0 |
| Progressive Alliance for Ghana | 1,957 | 0.02 | 0 |
| All People's Congress | 1,946 | 0.02 | 0 |
| Ghana Freedom Party | 643 | 0.01 | 0 |
| Great Consolidated Popular Party | 157 | 0.00 | 0 |
| Independents | 269,465 | 2.28 | 4 |
| Total | 11,819,857 | 100.00 | 276 |
| Valid votes | 11,819,857 | 98.95 | |
| Invalid/blank votes | 125,585 | 1.05 | |
| Total votes | 11,945,442 | 100.00 | |
| Registered voters/turnout | 18,618,684 | 64.16 | |

==== By constituencies ====
The result for Ablekuma North in the Greater Accra Region is still pending as the collation of the results could not be completed before the inauguration of the 9th Parliament. The result for the Ablekuma North constituency in the Greater Accra Region was eventually determined following a 2025 Ablekuma North parliamentary election rerun held on 11 July 2025, after the Electoral Commission was unable to complete collation before the inauguration of the 9th Parliament. Ewurabena Aubynn of the National Democratic Congress (NDC) won the seat, marking the first time the NDC had secured the constituency since the beginning of the Fourth Republic.

2024 general election results by constituency
| Region | Constituency | Candidate | Party | Votes |
|---|---|---|---|---|
| Ahafo | Asunafo North | Mohammed Haruna | National Democratic Congress | 34,082 |
| Ahafo | Asunafo North | Evans Opoku Bobie | New Patriotic Party | 25,101 |
| Ahafo | Asunafo North | Rejected | | 465 |
| Ahafo | Asunafo South | Opoku Eric | National Democratic Congress | 25,244 |
| Ahafo | Asunafo South | Frank Aduse Poku | New Patriotic Party | 18,736 |
| Ahafo | Asunafo South | Rejected | | 298 |
| Ahafo | Asutifi North | Ebenezer Kwaku Addo | National Democratic Congress | 18,584 |
| Ahafo | Asutifi North | Patrick Banor | New Patriotic Party | 14,207 |
| Ahafo | Asutifi North | Rejected | | 224 |
| Ahafo | Asutifi South | Collins Dauda | National Democratic Congress | 20,020 |
| Ahafo | Asutifi South | Yaw Owusu-Brempong | New Patriotic Party | 16,092 |
| Ahafo | Asutifi South | Andrews Kofi Ahiamata | National Democratic Party | 87 |
| Ahafo | Asutifi South | Rejected | | 267 |
| Ahafo | Tano North | Gideon Boako | New Patriotic Party | 21,127 |
| Ahafo | Tano North | Pius Opoku Sampson | National Democratic Congress | 1,707 |
| Ahafo | Tano North | Rejected | | 267 |
| Ahafo | Tano South | Charles Asiedu | National Democratic Congress | 20,056 |
| Ahafo | Tano South | Benjamin Yeboah Sekyere | New Patriotic Party | 19,061 |
| Ahafo | Tano South | Kofi Nti Christopher | Independent | 375 |
| Ahafo | Tano South | Rejected | | 316 |
| Ashanti | Adansi Asokwa | Godwin Animli Dorgbadzi-Dorani | National Democratic Congress | 14,229 |
| Ashanti | Adansi Asokwa | Kobina Tahir Hammond | New Patriotic Party | 13,275 |
| Ashanti | Adansi Asokwa | Mensah Abraham Justice | Convention People's Party | 346 |
| Ashanti | Adansi Asokwa | Rejected | | 457 |
| Ashanti | Afigya Kwabre North | Collins Adomako-Mensah | New Patriotic Party | 16,689 |
| Ashanti | Afigya Kwabre North | Emmanuel Jackson Agumah | National Democratic Congress | 13,383 |
| Ashanti | Afigya Kwabre North | Rejected | | 343 |
| Ashanti | Afigya Kwabre South | Damata Ama Appianimaa Salam | New Patriotic Party | 50,981 |
| Ashanti | Afigya Kwabre South | Nuzagl Vivien Nyuzagla | National Democratic Congress | 16,051 |
| Ashanti | Afigya Kwabre South | Idahosah Bright Benson | Independent | 2,777 |
| Ashanti | Afigya Kwabre South | Abdul Wahab Diyal Wilhak | Independent | 317 |
| Ashanti | Afigya Kwabre South | Ofori Daniel | Independent | 239 |
| Ashanti | Afigya Kwabre South | Rejected | | 496 |
| Ashanti | Afigya Sekyere East | Mavis Nkansah-Boadu | New Patriotic Party | 33,319 |
| Ashanti | Afigya Sekyere East | Twumasi Evans Amoh | National Democratic Congress | 14,782 |
| Ashanti | Afigya Sekyere East | Rejected | | 402 |
| Ashanti | Ahafo Ano North | Eric Nana Agyemang-Prempeh | New Patriotic Party | 20,353 |
| Ashanti | Ahafo Ano North | Kwasi Adusei | National Democratic Congress | 20,232 |
| Ashanti | Ahafo Ano North | Rejected | | 390 |
| Ashanti | Ahafo Ano South East | Yakubu Mohammed | National Democratic Congress | 15,609 |
| Ashanti | Ahafo Ano South East | Frederick Acheampong | New Patriotic Party | 14,152 |
| Ashanti | Ahafo Ano South East | Rejected | | 231 |
| Ashanti | Ahafo Ano South West | Osei Mensah Dapaah Elvis | New Patriotic Party | 16,058 |
| Ashanti | Ahafo Ano South West | Sedik Abubakar | National Democratic Congress | 15,372 |
| Ashanti | Ahafo Ano South West | Rejected | | 0 |
| Ashanti | Akrofruom | Joseph Azumah | National Democratic Congress | 10,103 |
| Ashanti | Akrofruom | Alex Blankson | New Patriotic Party | 8,589 |
| Ashanti | Akrofruom | Rejected | | 161 |
| Ashanti | Asante Akim Central | Kwame Anyimadu-Antwi | New Patriotic Party | 16,628 |
| Ashanti | Asante Akim Central | Ebenezer Ekow Aidoo | National Democratic Congress | 10,739 |
| Ashanti | Asante Akim Central | Richard Adu Darko | Independent | 9,334 |
| Ashanti | Asante Akim Central | Isaac Dzameshie | Ghana Freedom Party | 256 |
| Ashanti | Asante Akim Central | Rejected | | 346 |
| Ashanti | Asante Akim North | Ohene Kwame Frimpong | Independent | 26,926 |
| Ashanti | Asante Akim North | Andy Kwame Appiah-Kubi | New Patriotic Party | 8,933 |
| Ashanti | Asante Akim North | Kofi Asamoah | National Democratic Congress | 2,469 |
| Ashanti | Asante Akim North | Rejected | | 513 |
| Ashanti | Asante Akim South | Kwaku Asante-Boateng | New Patriotic Party | 27,396 |
| Ashanti | Asante Akim South | Maame Sarfoah Appiah | National Democratic Congress | 23,244 |
| Ashanti | Asante Akim South | Rejected | | 552 |
| Ashanti | Asawase | Muntaka Mohammed-Mubarak | National Democratic Congress | 41,667 |
| Ashanti | Asawase | Manaf Ibrahim | New Patriotic Party | 31,049 |
| Ashanti | Asawase | Issah Baba Kompo | Progressive People's Party | 107 |
| Ashanti | Asawase | Alhassan Rafik | Independent | 101 |
| Ashanti | Asawase | Naomi Nsor | Liberal Party of Ghana | 77 |
| Ashanti | Asawase | Rejected | | 340 |
| Ashanti | Asokwa | Patricia Appiagyei | New Patriotic Party | 41,619 |
| Ashanti | Asokwa | Amoh Kamel | National Democratic Congress | 16,205 |
| Ashanti | Asokwa | Rejected | | 544 |
| Ashanti | Atwima Kwanwoma | Kofi Amankwa-Manu | New Patriotic Party | 57,338 |
| Ashanti | Atwima Kwanwoma | Grace Agyemang Asamoah | National Democratic Congress | 18,692 |
| Ashanti | Atwima Kwanwoma | Obiba James Annan | People's National Convention | 395 |
| Ashanti | Atwima Kwanwoma | Rejected | | 635 |
| Ashanti | Atwima Mponua | Seth Osei-Akoto | New Patriotic Party | 29,616 |
| Ashanti | Atwima Mponua | Stephen Yeboah | National Democratic Congress | 28,617 |
| Ashanti | Atwima Mponua | Rejected | | 461 |
| Ashanti | Atwima Nwabiagya North | Frank Yeboah | New Patriotic Party | 36,924 |
| Ashanti | Atwima Nwabiagya North | Mba Zechariah Alenbilla | National Democratic Congress | 14,502 |
| Ashanti | Atwima Nwabiagya North | Emmanual Osei Gyamfi | Independent | 2,831 |
| Ashanti | Atwima Nwabiagya North | Kandiire Joachim | Independent | 415 |
| Ashanti | Atwima Nwabiagya North | Rejected | | 386 |
| Ashanti | Atwima Nwabiagya South | Shirley Kyei | New Patriotic Party | 45,352 |
| Ashanti | Atwima Nwabiagya South | Wisdom Osel Boamah | National Democratic Congress | 17,068 |
| Ashanti | Atwima Nwabiagya South | Rejected | | 420 |
| Ashanti | Bantama | Francis Asenso-Boakye | New Patriotic Party | 47,275 |
| Ashanti | Bantama | Simeon Addai Dapaah | National Democratic Congress | 8,023 |
| Ashanti | Bantama | Rejected | | 248 |
| Ashanti | Bekwai | Ralph Poku-Adusei | New Patriotic Party | 31,060 |
| Ashanti | Bekwai | Kwasi Amofa-Agyemang | Independent | 16,875 |
| Ashanti | Bekwai | Prempeh Junior Samuel | National Democratic Congress | 5,321 |
| Ashanti | Bekwai | Yahaya Nasiru | People's National Convention | 234 |
| Ashanti | Bekwai | Lovista Owusu | Liberal Party of Ghana | 209 |
| Ashanti | Bekwai | Rejected | | 460 |
| Ashanti | Bosome Freho | Nana Asafo-Adjei Ayeh | New Patriotic Party | 18,208 |
| Ashanti | Bosome Freho | Charles Appiah-Kubi | National Democratic Congress | 7,602 |
| Ashanti | Bosome Freho | Rejected | | 219 |
| Ashanti | Bosomtwe | Yaw Osei Adutwum | New Patriotic Party | 46,797 |
| Ashanti | Bosomtwe | Abdullah Hamidu | National Democratic Congress | 12,842 |
| Ashanti | Bosomtwe | Adusei-Akwaboah Samuel | Liberal Party of Ghana | 200 |
| Ashanti | Bosomtwe | Eric Osei Boateng | Convention People's Party | 152 |
| Ashanti | Bosomtwe | Rejected | | 393 |
| Ashanti | Efiduase/Asokore | Nana Ayew Afriye | New Patriotic Party | 23,322 |
| Ashanti | Efiduase/Asokore | Raymond Opoku Agyeman | National Democratic Congress | 7,903 |
| Ashanti | Efiduase/Asokore | Rejected | | 371 |
| Ashanti | Ejisu | Kwabena Boateng | New Patriotic Party | 53,626 |
| Ashanti | Ejisu | Jerryne Asante | National Democratic Congress | 18,041 |
| Ashanti | Ejisu | Okai Kwanin | Independent | 771 |
| Ashanti | Ejisu | Fredua Agyemang Joseph | Independent | 442 |
| Ashanti | Ejisu | George Gyapah | Independent | 261 |
| Ashanti | Ejisu | Osei Esther | Convention People's Party | 258 |
| Ashanti | Ejisu | Rejected | | 491 |
| Ashanti | Ejura Sekyedumase | Muhammad Bawah Braimah | National Democratic Congress | 27,776 |
| Ashanti | Ejura Sekyedumase | Gifty Ndoma | New Patriotic Party | 24,751 |
| Ashanti | Ejura Sekyedumase | Rejected | | 565 |
| Ashanti | Fomena | Andrew Asiamah Amoako | New Patriotic Party | 14,543 |
| Ashanti | Fomena | Ogbeh Charles Kofi | National Democratic Congress | 6,925 |
| Ashanti | Fomena | Rejected | | 225 |
| Ashanti | Juaben | Francis Kwabena Berepong Owusu-Akyaw | New Patriotic Party | 21,168 |
| Ashanti | Juaben | Eunice Ohenewaa Ansu | National Democratic Congress | 8,421 |
| Ashanti | Juaben | Rejected | | 230 |
| Ashanti | Kumawu | Ernest Yaw Anim | New Patriotic Party | 21,422 |
| Ashanti | Kumawu | Kwasi Amankwaa | National Democratic Congress | 6,732 |
| Ashanti | Kumawu | Rejected | | 160 |
| Ashanti | Kwabre East | Onyina-Acheampong Akwasi Gyamfi | New Patriotic Party | 68,106 |
| Ashanti | Kwabre East | Joseph Amankwah | National Democratic Congress | 27,630 |
| Ashanti | Kwabre East | Lord Foster Adom Nyamekye | Independent | 264 |
| Ashanti | Kwabre East | Bencha George | Ghana Freedom Party | 177 |
| Ashanti | Kwabre East | Rejected | | 574 |
| Ashanti | Kwadaso | Kingsley Nyarko | New Patriotic Party | 45,858 |
| Ashanti | Kwadaso | Eric Asibey | National Democratic Congress | 11,221 |
| Ashanti | Kwadaso | Adongo Akwasi David | People's National Convention | 497 |
| Ashanti | Kwadaso | Rejected | | 431 |
| Ashanti | Mampong | Kwaku Ampratwum-Sarpong | New Patriotic Party | 27,721 |
| Ashanti | Mampong | Yakubu Issifu | National Democratic Congress | 15,486 |
| Ashanti | Mampong | Sarkodie Peter Abum | Independent | 3,006 |
| Ashanti | Mampong | Rejected | | 482 |
| Ashanti | Manhyia North | Akwasi Konadu | New Patriotic Party | 29,675 |
| Ashanti | Manhyia North | Hamza Swallah | National Democratic Congress | 16,151 |
| Ashanti | Manhyia North | Rejected | | 252 |
| Ashanti | Manhyia South | Nana Agyei Baffour Awuah | New Patriotic Party | 21,978 |
| Ashanti | Manhyia South | Rita Amonu Gyamfua Antwi | National Democratic Congress | 6,555 |
| Ashanti | Manhyia South | Marfo Kwaku | Liberal Party of Ghana | 298 |
| Ashanti | Manhyia South | Rejected | | 194 |
| Ashanti | Manso Edubia | Yaw Frimpong Addo | New Patriotic Party | 19,530 |
| Ashanti | Manso Edubia | Benjamin Marfo | National Democratic Congress | 13,438 |
| Ashanti | Manso Edubia | Selina Adom | People's National Convention | 689 |
| Ashanti | Manso Edubia | Rejected | | 618 |
| Ashanti | Manso Nkwanta | Tweneboa Kodua Fokuo | New Patriotic Party | 26,684 |
| Ashanti | Manso Nkwanta | Samuel Adjei | National Democratic Congress | 9,706 |
| Ashanti | Manso Nkwanta | Rejected | | 316 |
| Ashanti | New Edubiase | Abdul Salam Adams | National Democratic Congress | 18,717 |
| Ashanti | New Edubiase | George Boahen Oduro | New Patriotic Party | 17,612 |
| Ashanti | New Edubiase | Rejected | | 320 |
| Ashanti | Nhyiaeso | Stephen Amoah | New Patriotic Party | 35,502 |
| Ashanti | Nhyiaeso | Faustina Bayor Dery | National Democratic Congress | 14,071 |
| Ashanti | Nhyiaeso | Joan Abunyewah | Liberal Party of Ghana | 584 |
| Ashanti | Nhyiaeso | Rejected | | 396 |
| Ashanti | Nsuta/Kwamang/Beposo | Adelaide Ntim | New Patriotic Party | 16,179 |
| Ashanti | Nsuta/Kwamang/Beposo | Ofori Attah Aboagye | National Democratic Congress | 9,388 |
| Ashanti | Nsuta/Kwamang/Beposo | Kwankye Aaron Prosper | Independent | 3,384 |
| Ashanti | Nsuta/Kwamang/Beposo | Rejected | | 333 |
| Ashanti | Obuasi East | Patrick Boakye-Yiadom | New Patriotic Party | 18,558 |
| Ashanti | Obuasi East | Samuel Aboagye | National Democratic Congress | 18,539 |
| Ashanti | Obuasi East | Adjei Owusu Afriyie | Independent | 424 |
| Ashanti | Obuasi East | Rejected | | 245 |
| Ashanti | Obuasi West | Kwaku Agyeman Kwarteng | New Patriotic Party | 18,586 |
| Ashanti | Obuasi West | Appiah Kannin Faustilove | National Democratic Congress | 15,244 |
| Ashanti | Obuasi West | Annin Kofi Appianin | Independent | 7,031 |
| Ashanti | Obuasi West | Rejected | | 268 |
| Ashanti | Odotobri | Anthony Mmieh | New Patriotic Party | 25,398 |
| Ashanti | Odotobri | Emmanuel Obeng Agyemang | National Democratic Congress | 7,973 |
| Ashanti | Odotobri | Isaac Kofi Gyamfi | Independent | 279 |
| Ashanti | Odotobri | Rejected | | 433 |
| Ashanti | Offinso North | Fred Kyei Asamoah | New Patriotic Party | 20,251 |
| Ashanti | Offinso North | Ceasar Acheampong Ofosu | National Democratic Congress | 18,699 |
| Ashanti | Offinso North | Abdul Nasir Deen | People's National Convention | 105 |
| Ashanti | Offinso North | Rejected | | 411 |
| Ashanti | Offinso South | Isaac Yaw Opoku | New Patriotic Party | 28,603 |
| Ashanti | Offinso South | Asare Bediako Vincent | National Democratic Congress | 24,940 |
| Ashanti | Offinso South | Rejected | | 531 |
| Ashanti | Oforikrom | Michael Kwasi Aidoo | New Patriotic Party | 47,709 |
| Ashanti | Oforikrom | Anwel Sadat Ahmed | National Democratic Congress | 24,483 |
| Ashanti | Oforikrom | Benjamin Afrane Amankwa | Independent | 404 |
| Ashanti | Oforikrom | Rejected | | 356 |
| Ashanti | Old Tafo | Vincent Ekwow Assafuah | New Patriotic Party | 34,097 |
| Ashanti | Old Tafo | Sahmudeen Mohammed Kamil | National Democratic Congress | 15,707 |
| Ashanti | Old Tafo | Daniel Kusi Aseidu | Independent | 221 |
| Ashanti | Old Tafo | Obiri Yeboah Frank | Ghana Freedom Party | 118 |
| Ashanti | Old Tafo | Rejected | | 294 |
| Ashanti | Sekyere Afram Plains | Nasira Afrah Gyekye | National Democratic Congress | 11,524 |
| Ashanti | Sekyere Afram Plains | George Akom | New Patriotic Party | 4,725 |
| Ashanti | Sekyere Afram Plains | Rejected | | 168 |
| Ashanti | Suame | John Darko | New Patriotic Party | 51,491 |
| Ashanti | Suame | Frank Owusu Ansah | National Democratic Congress | 14,948 |
| Ashanti | Suame | Mohammed Mubarak | All People's Congress | 435 |
| Ashanti | Suame | Rejected | | 348 |
| Ashanti | Subin | Kofi Obiri Yeboah | New Patriotic Party | 31,983 |
| Ashanti | Subin | Akwasi Agyekum Nana Denkyi | National Democratic Congress | 12,684 |
| Ashanti | Subin | Joseph Boakye – Danquah | Independent | 2,336 |
| Ashanti | Subin | Benedicta Kusi Afram | Liberal Party of Ghana | 174 |
| Ashanti | Subin | Rejected | | 292 |
| Bono | Banda | Ibrahim Ahmed | National Democratic Congress | 9,150 |
| Bono | Banda | Joe Danquah | New Patriotic Party | 8,010 |
| Bono | Banda | Isaac K, Annorhene | Independent | 41 |
| Bono | Banda | Paul Nyankamago | Great Consolidated Popular Party | 32 |
| Bono | Banda | Yeboah Abbrey | National Democratic Party | 29 |
| Bono | Banda | Rejected | | 176 |
| Bono | Berekum East | Ampaabeng Kyeremeh Simon | National Democratic Congress | 23,476 |
| Bono | Berekum East | Nelson Kyeremeh | New Patriotic Party | 14,356 |
| Bono | Berekum East | Adarkwa Blessing Emmanuel Kwame | Progressive Alliance for Ghana | 162 |
| Bono | Berekum East | Baifi Abigail | People's National Convention | 96 |
| Bono | Berekum East | Rejected | | 266 |
| Bono | Berekum West | Dickson Kyere-Duah | National Democratic Congress | 13,869 |
| Bono | Berekum West | Kwaku Agyenim-Boateng | New Patriotic Party | 8,651 |
| Bono | Berekum West | Rejected | | 192 |
| Bono | Dormaa Central | John Kwame Adu Jack | National Democratic Congress | 23,035 |
| Bono | Dormaa Central | Kwaku Agyeman-Manu | New Patriotic Party | 17,450 |
| Bono | Dormaa Central | Jochee Uroy Edem | Great Consolidated Popular Party | 125 |
| Bono | Dormaa Central | Eric Kwaku Yeboah | National Democratic Party | 97 |
| Bono | Dormaa Central | Rejected | | 410 |
| Bono | Dormaa East | Owusuah Rachel Amma | National Democratic Congress | 12,310 |
| Bono | Dormaa East | Paul Apereku Twum-Barimah | New Patriotic Party | 12,050 |
| Bono | Dormaa East | Emmanuel Twih Gyabaah | Independent | 126 |
| Bono | Dormaa East | Rejected | | 314 |
| Bono | Dormaa West | Vincent Oppong Asamoah | National Democratic Congress | 11,299 |
| Bono | Dormaa West | Ali Maiga Halidu | New Patriotic Party | 9,101 |
| Bono | Dormaa West | Umar Yusif | Independent | 130 |
| Bono | Dormaa West | Rejected | | 262 |
| Bono | Jaman North | Ahenkwah Frederick Yaw | National Democratic Congress | 21,134 |
| Bono | Jaman North | Enock Nyarko | New Patriotic Party | 15,316 |
| Bono | Jaman North | Martin Kwame Antwi | Independent | 181 |
| Bono | Jaman North | Rejected | | 391 |
| Bono | Jaman South | Kwadwo Damoah | New Patriotic Party | 21,637 |
| Bono | Jaman South | Okofo-Dateh Williams | National Democratic Congress | 20,176 |
| Bono | Jaman South | Bediako Joyce Asare | National Democratic Party | 116 |
| Bono | Jaman South | Rejected | | 458 |
| Bono | Sunyani East | Seid Mubarak | National Democratic Congress | 34,453 |
| Bono | Sunyani East | Kwasi Ameyaw-Cheremeh | New Patriotic Party | 22,306 |
| Bono | Sunyani East | Ransford Antwi | Independent | 8,294 |
| Bono | Sunyani East | Alannyina Sampana Sampson | People's National Convention | 222 |
| Bono | Sunyani East | Rejected | | 482 |
| Bono | Sunyani West | Millicent Yeboah Amankwah | National Democratic Congress | 26,828 |
| Bono | Sunyani West | Ignatius Baffour Awuah | New Patriotic Party | 19,715 |
| Bono | Sunyani West | Rejected | | 502 |
| Bono | Tain | Adama Sulemana | National Democratic Congress | 21,478 |
| Bono | Tain | Ababio Alexandeer | New Patriotic Party | 20,726 |
| Bono | Tain | Sah Job Kwabena | National Democratic Party | 235 |
| Bono | Tain | Rejected | | 641 |
| Bono | Wenchi | Haruna Seidu | National Democratic Congress | 26,549 |
| Bono | Wenchi | Kojo Frempong | New Patriotic Party | 20,941 |
| Bono | Wenchi | David Kusi | Independent | 191 |
| Bono | Wenchi | Rejected | | 564 |
| Bono East | Atebubu/Amantin | Sanja Nanja | National Democratic Congress | 25,758 |
| Bono East | Atebubu/Amantin | Baduon Dimmie Issah Abu | New Patriotic Party | 18,977 |
| Bono East | Atebubu/Amantin | Hennaa Kwaku Abraham | Progressive People's Party | 299 |
| Bono East | Atebubu/Amantin | Rejected | | 748 |
| Bono East | Kintampo North | Joseph Kwame Kumah | National Democratic Congress | 29,606 |
| Bono East | Kintampo North | Isaac Baffoe Ameyaw | New Patriotic Party | 16,794 |
| Bono East | Kintampo North | Buare Kojo | Independent | 565 |
| Bono East | Kintampo North | Rejected | | 773 |
| Bono East | Kintampo South | Felicia Adjei | National Democratic Congress | 20,867 |
| Bono East | Kintampo South | Alexander Gyan | New Patriotic Party | 15,186 |
| Bono East | Kintampo South | Rejected | | 479 |
| Bono East | Nkoranza North | Mensah Kwasi Joseph | National Democratic Congress | 10,453 |
| Bono East | Nkoranza North | Jacqueline Boatemaa Bonsu | New Patriotic Party | 9,784 |
| Bono East | Nkoranza North | Charles Owusu | Independent | 5,486 |
| Bono East | Nkoranza North | Boahene Clement | Liberal Party of Ghana | 92 |
| Bono East | Nkoranza North | Rejected | | 463 |
| Bono East | Nkoranza South | Emmanuel Kwadwo Agyekum | National Democratic Congress | 28,469 |
| Bono East | Nkoranza South | Harriet Kyeremanteng Oppong | New Patriotic Party | 20,912 |
| Bono East | Nkoranza South | Sabastine Gaata | Liberal Party of Ghana | 112 |
| Bono East | Nkoranza South | Florence Ampour | People's National Convention | 73 |
| Bono East | Nkoranza South | Rejected | | 418 |
| Bono East | Pru East | Emmanuel Kwaku Boam | National Democratic Congress | 20,287 |
| Bono East | Pru East | Apetorgbor Yussif Appeh | New Patriotic Party | 8,737 |
| Bono East | Pru East | Felix Nimako | Independent | 2,504 |
| Bono East | Pru East | Rejected | | 561 |
| Bono East | Pru West | Emmanuel Kofi Ntekuni | National Democratic Congress | 15,711 |
| Bono East | Pru West | Stephen Pambiin Jalulah | New Patriotic Party | 13,876 |
| Bono East | Pru West | Rejected | | 418 |
| Bono East | Sene East | Napare Dominic | National Democratic Congress | 11,630 |
| Bono East | Sene East | Wudonyim Kofi Ibrahim | New Patriotic Party | 6,954 |
| Bono East | Sene East | Rejected | | 477 |
| Bono East | Sene West | Kwame Twumasi Ampofo | National Democratic Congress | 13,824 |
| Bono East | Sene West | Joseph Kumah Mackay | New Patriotic Party | 13,362 |
| Bono East | Sene West | Rejected | | 385 |
| Bono East | Techiman North | Elizabeth Ofosu- Adjare | National Democratic Congress | 22,513 |
| Bono East | Techiman North | Martin Oti Gyarko | New Patriotic Party | 19,214 |
| Bono East | Techiman North | Frank Asare | Independent | 361 |
| Bono East | Techiman North | Rejected | | 426 |
| Bono East | Techiman South | Martin Kwaku Adjei-Mensah Korsah | New Patriotic Party | 46,663 |
| Bono East | Techiman South | Christophper Beyere Baasongti | National Democratic Congress | 43,529 |
| Bono East | Techiman South | Donkor Moses | Progressive People's Party | 140 |
| Bono East | Techiman South | Boyoung Iddris | Independent | 76 |
| Bono East | Techiman South | Rejected | | 844 |
| Central | Abura Asebu Kwamankese | Felix Kwakye Ofosu | National Democratic Congress | 30,607 |
| Central | Abura Asebu Kwamankese | Eric Kobina Nyanteh | New Patriotic Party | 19,598 |
| Central | Abura Asebu Kwamankese | John Annsmann-Ansah-Psalms | Ghana Union Movement | 293 |
| Central | Abura Asebu Kwamankese | Rejected | | 604 |
| Central | Agona East | Sawyerr Queenstar Pokuah | National Democratic Congress | 22,225 |
| Central | Agona East | Asamoah Hannah | New Patriotic Party | 17,256 |
| Central | Agona East | Essien Eric | Liberal Party of Ghana | 334 |
| Central | Agona East | Rejected | | 546 |
| Central | Agona West | Dangbey Ernestina Ofori | National Democratic Congress | 26,080 |
| Central | Agona West | Arthur Christopher | New Patriotic Party | 20,693 |
| Central | Agona West | Morrison Cynthia Mamle | Independent | 7,160 |
| Central | Agona West | Rejected | | 660 |
| Central | Ajumako Enyan Esiam | Forson Cassiel Ato Baah | National Democratic Congress | 40,478 |
| Central | Ajumako Enyan Esiam | Etuaful Rashid Kwesi | New Patriotic Party | 18,251 |
| Central | Ajumako Enyan Esiam | Rejected | | 480 |
| Central | Asikuma Odoben Brakwa | Ghansah Alhassan Kobina | National Democratic Congress | 25,244 |
| Central | Asikuma Odoben Brakwa | Winifred Abaidoo-Ayin | New Patriotic Party | 22,498 |
| Central | Asikuma Odoben Brakwa | Precious Mawulorm Amevor | Ghana Union Movement | 263 |
| Central | Asikuma Odoben Brakwa | Rejected | | 577 |
| Central | Assin Central | Migyimah Shaibu Nurein | National Democratic Congress | 16,343 |
| Central | Assin Central | Anewu Godfred | New Patriotic Party | 15,926 |
| Central | Assin Central | Rejected | | 275 |
| Central | Assin North | Quayson James Gyakye | National Democratic Congress | 18,023 |
| Central | Assin North | Opoku Charles | New Patriotic Party | 13,599 |
| Central | Assin North | Rejected | | 360 |
| Central | Assin South | Fordjour John Ntim | New Patriotic Party | 14,899 |
| Central | Assin South | Baidoo Stephen Kofi | National Democratic Congress | 13,354 |
| Central | Assin South | Damtse Joseph Kofi | Independent | 10,332 |
| Central | Assin South | Rejected | | 557 |
| Central | Awutu Senya East | Phillis Naa Koryoo Okunor | National Democratic Congress | 50,886 |
| Central | Awutu Senya East | Koomson Mavis Hawa | New Patriotic Party | 45,638 |
| Central | Awutu Senya East | Rejected | | 635 |
| Central | Awutu Senya West | Tetteh-Agbotui Gizella | National Democratic Congress | 33,995 |
| Central | Awutu Senya West | Arhin Eugene Kofi Bentum | New Patriotic Party | 26,937 |
| Central | Awutu Senya West | Rejected | | 453 |
| Central | Cape Coast North | Nyarku Kwamena Minta | National Democratic Congress | 23,521 |
| Central | Cape Coast North | Ewusi Horace Ekow | New Patriotic Party | 17,045 |
| Central | Cape Coast North | Andoh Thomas | Progressive People's Party | 292 |
| Central | Cape Coast North | Rejected | | 271 |
| Central | Cape Coast South | Ricketts-Hagan George Kweku | National Democratic Congress | 21,277 |
| Central | Cape Coast South | Arthur Ernest | New Patriotic Party | 14,163 |
| Central | Cape Coast South | Mensah Emmanuel Andoh Perry | Independent | 1,735 |
| Central | Cape Coast South | Manu Isaac | Independent | 223 |
| Central | Cape Coast South | Rejected | | 301 |
| Central | Effutu | Alexander Afenyo-Markin | New Patriotic Party | 39,512 |
| Central | Effutu | Annan James Kofi | National Democratic Congress | 19,383 |
| Central | Effutu | Buabeng Louisa | Independent | 81 |
| Central | Effutu | Rejected | | 609 |
| Central | Ekumfi | Kwainoe Ekow Othniel | National Democratic Congress | 18,413 |
| Central | Ekumfi | Stelfa Nana Adu Okumkom Donkor | New Patriotic Party | 11,014 |
| Central | Ekumfi | Rejected | | 398 |
| Central | Gomoa Central | Obeng Kwame Asare | Independent | 14,277 |
| Central | Gomoa Central | Eyiah Naana | New Patriotic Party | 11,637 |
| Central | Gomoa Central | Yawson Muhammed Naeem-Deen | National Democratic Congress | 10,112 |
| Central | Gomoa Central | Rejected | | 700 |
| Central | Gomoa East | Paitoo Desmond De-Graft | National Democratic Congress | 33,806 |
| Central | Gomoa East | Asemanyi Kojo | New Patriotic Party | 25,421 |
| Central | Gomoa East | Issah Mohammed | All People's Congress | 326 |
| Central | Gomoa East | Rejected | | 638 |
| Central | Gomoa West | Richard Gyan-Mensah | National Democratic Congress | 30,884 |
| Central | Gomoa West | Bismark Baisie Nkum | New Patriotic Party | 19,211 |
| Central | Gomoa West | Rejected | | 590 |
| Central | Hemang Lower Denkyira | Lawrence Agyinsam | New Patriotic Party | 17,228 |
| Central | Hemang Lower Denkyira | Agyapong-Mensah Seth | National Democratic Congress | 9,527 |
| Central | Hemang Lower Denkyira | Benjamin Bimpong Donkor | Independent | 377 |
| Central | Hemang Lower Denkyira | Sampson Kwame Owonna | Convention People's Party | 113 |
| Central | Hemang Lower Denkyira | Rejected | | 400 |
| Central | Komenda Edina Eguafo Abrem | Samuel Atta Mills | National Democratic Congress | 30,220 |
| Central | Komenda Edina Eguafo Abrem | Dennis Percyval Quaicoe | New Patriotic Party | 17,675 |
| Central | Komenda Edina Eguafo Abrem | Emmanuel Kofi Duku | Progressive People's Party | 740 |
| Central | Komenda Edina Eguafo Abrem | Rejected | | 964 |
| Central | Mfantseman | Arhin Ebenezer Prince | National Democratic Congress | 36,989 |
| Central | Mfantseman | Ophelia Mensah | New Patriotic Party | 24,099 |
| Central | Mfantseman | Rejected | | 647 |
| Central | Twifo Atti Morkwa | Vondee T, D, David | National Democratic Congress | 19,706 |
| Central | Twifo Atti Morkwa | Dwamena Obeng Ebenezer | New Patriotic Party | 15,352 |
| Central | Twifo Atti Morkwa | Donkoh Adowa | Ghana Union Movement | 243 |
| Central | Twifo Atti Morkwa | Rejected | | 460 |
| Central | Upper Denkyira East | Ankomah Emelia | National Democratic Congress | 24,426 |
| Central | Upper Denkyira East | Festus Awuah Kwofie | New Patriotic Party | 19,039 |
| Central | Upper Denkyira East | Offin Amaniampong Owusu | People's National Convention | 96 |
| Central | Upper Denkyira East | Rejected | | 334 |
| Central | Upper Denkyira West | Rudolf Amoako-Gyampah | New Patriotic Party | 16,947 |
| Central | Upper Denkyira West | Darko Daniel Ohene | National Democratic Congress | 13,858 |
| Central | Upper Denkyira West | Emmanuel Gadjo | Ghana Union Movement | 208 |
| Central | Upper Denkyira West | Rejected | | 377 |
| Eastern | Abetifi | Bryan Acheampong | New Patriotic Party | 22,287 |
| Eastern | Abetifi | Addo Isaac Amoafo | National Democratic Congress | 8,338 |
| Eastern | Abetifi | Rejected | | 231 |
| Eastern | Abirem | Charles Asuako Owiredu | New Patriotic Party | 18,088 |
| Eastern | Abirem | Nurudeen Fuseini | National Democratic Congress | 12,003 |
| Eastern | Abirem | Rejected | | 333 |
| Eastern | Abuakwa North | Addo-Frempong Nana Ampaw Kwame | New Patriotic Party | 15,241 |
| Eastern | Abuakwa North | Charles Yeboah Darko | National Democratic Congress | 14,508 |
| Eastern | Abuakwa North | Rejected | | 162 |
| Eastern | Abuakwa South | Kingsley Agyemang | New Patriotic Party | 27,011 |
| Eastern | Abuakwa South | Nana Adu Sarpong Addo-Aikins | National Democratic Congress | 7,454 |
| Eastern | Abuakwa South | Rejected | | 277 |
| Eastern | Achiase | Kofi Ahenkorah Marfo | New Patriotic Party | 12,076 |
| Eastern | Achiase | Samuel Owusu Brako | National Democratic Congress | 10,156 |
| Eastern | Achiase | Rejected | | 256 |
| Eastern | Afram Plains South | Joseph Appiah Boateng | National Democratic Congress | 11,876 |
| Eastern | Afram Plains South | Jacob Zineyele | New Patriotic Party | 7,578 |
| Eastern | Afram Plains South | Grace Nudonu Abra Adiepena | Independent | 3,701 |
| Eastern | Afram Plains South | Iddrisu Seidu Ibn-Swalah | Progressive Alliance for Ghana | 108 |
| Eastern | Afram Plains South | Rejected | | 444 |
| Eastern | Akim Oda | Alexander Akwasi Acquah | New Patriotic Party | 19,341 |
| Eastern | Akim Oda | Jones Asante | National Democratic Congress | 7,455 |
| Eastern | Akim Oda | Rejected | | 177 |
| Eastern | Akim Swedru | Osei Kennedy Nyarko | New Patriotic Party | 9,443 |
| Eastern | Akim Swedru | Taaju Abdu Rahim | National Democratic Congress | 4,788 |
| Eastern | Akim Swedru | Rejected | | 213 |
| Eastern | Akropong | Samuel Awuku | New Patriotic Party | 28,365 |
| Eastern | Akropong | John Evans Kumordzi | National Democratic Congress | 14,217 |
| Eastern | Akropong | Rejected | | 237 |
| Eastern | Akuapem South | Lawrencia Dziwornu | National Democratic Congress | 15,438 |
| Eastern | Akuapem South | Eric Yeboah Apeadu | New Patriotic Party | 15,304 |
| Eastern | Akuapem South | Rejected | | 287 |
| Eastern | Akwatia | Ernest Kumi | New Patriotic Party | 19,269 |
| Eastern | Akwatia | Henry Yiadom Boakye | National Democratic Congress | 17,206 |
| Eastern | Akwatia | Rejected | | 294 |
| Eastern | Asene/Akroso/Manso | George Kwame Aboagye | New Patriotic Party | 15,792 |
| Eastern | Asene/Akroso/Manso | Eric Ahinakwa | National Democratic Congress | 13,078 |
| Eastern | Asene/Akroso/Manso | Rejected | | 346 |
| Eastern | Asuogyaman | Thomas Ampem Nyarko | National Democratic Congress | 26,085 |
| Eastern | Asuogyaman | Pius Enam Hadzide | New Patriotic Party | 21,290 |
| Eastern | Asuogyaman | Rejected | | 348 |
| Eastern | Atiwa East | Abena Osei-Asare | New Patriotic Party | 17,501 |
| Eastern | Atiwa East | Kenneth Agyare | National Democratic Congress | 5,334 |
| Eastern | Atiwa East | Nana Adjei Kyerema | Independent | 3,286 |
| Eastern | Atiwa East | Rejected | | 243 |
| Eastern | Atiwa West | Laurette Korkor Asante | New Patriotic Party | 16,395 |
| Eastern | Atiwa West | Ofosuapea Dennis Owusu-Appiah | National Democratic Congress | 8,061 |
| Eastern | Atiwa West | Rejected | | 178 |
| Eastern | Ayensuano | Ida Adjoa Asiedu | New Patriotic Party | 18,229 |
| Eastern | Ayensuano | Addi Safori Teddy | National Democratic Congress | 17,182 |
| Eastern | Ayensuano | Abrokwa Aboagye Sintim | Independent | 722 |
| Eastern | Ayensuano | Learned Obiri Ebenezer Yirenkyi | Independent | 140 |
| Eastern | Ayensuano | Rejected | | 538 |
| Eastern | Fanteakwa North | Kwame Appiah Kodua | New Patriotic Party | 11,751 |
| Eastern | Fanteakwa North | Apaw-Wiredu Haroun | National Democratic Congress | 11,297 |
| Eastern | Fanteakwa North | Rejected | | 234 |
| Eastern | Fanteakwa South | Duke William Allen Kwame Amoako-Atta Ofori-Atta | New Patriotic Party | 12,017 |
| Eastern | Fanteakwa South | Kingsley Owusu Newman | National Democratic Congress | 6,805 |
| Eastern | Fanteakwa South | Rejected | | 146 |
| Eastern | Kade | Agyare Alexander | New Patriotic Party | 20,225 |
| Eastern | Kade | Emmanuel Kofi Nti | National Democratic Congress | 16,638 |
| Eastern | Kade | Ohemeng-Tinyase Kwabena | Independent | 4,714 |
| Eastern | Kade | Rejected | | 512 |
| Eastern | Kwahu Afram Plains North | Worlase Kpeli | Independent | 11,452 |
| Eastern | Kwahu Afram Plains North | Betty Nana Efua Krosbi Mensah | National Democratic Congress | 10,993 |
| Eastern | Kwahu Afram Plains North | Asaimah K, Anim | New Patriotic Party | 1,992 |
| Eastern | Kwahu Afram Plains North | Agbakpe Hillary | National Democratic Party | 70 |
| Eastern | Kwahu Afram Plains North | Rejected | | 418 |
| Eastern | Lower Manya Krobo | Ebenezer Okletey Terlabi | National Democratic Congress | 29,048 |
| Eastern | Lower Manya Krobo | Simon Kweku Tetteh | New Patriotic Party | 15,653 |
| Eastern | Lower Manya Krobo | Rejected | | 473 |
| Eastern | Lower West Akim | Owen Kwame Frimpong | National Democratic Congress | 23,138 |
| Eastern | Lower West Akim | Charles Acheampong | New Patriotic Party | 21,573 |
| Eastern | Lower West Akim | Gifty Klenam | Independent | 152 |
| Eastern | Lower West Akim | Rejected | | 440 |
| Eastern | Mpraeso | Davis Ansah Opoku | New Patriotic Party | 17,930 |
| Eastern | Mpraeso | Muhayadeen Adam Kaleem | National Democratic Congress | 9,885 |
| Eastern | Mpraeso | Osei Michael | Convention People's Party | 364 |
| Eastern | Mpraeso | Ofosu-Asante Augustina | Ghana Union Movement | 213 |
| Eastern | Mpraeso | Rejected | | 342 |
| Eastern | New Juaben North | Nana Osei-Adjei | New Patriotic Party | 17,390 |
| Eastern | New Juaben North | Samuel Adongo | National Democratic Congress | 10,600 |
| Eastern | New Juaben North | Emmanuel Ofosu Yeboah | Independent | 235 |
| Eastern | New Juaben North | Rejected | | 198 |
| Eastern | New Juaben South | Michael Okyere Baafi | New Patriotic Party | 32,134 |
| Eastern | New Juaben South | Offei Martin Otu | National Democratic Congress | 23,735 |
| Eastern | New Juaben South | Appiah Evans | Independent | 1,306 |
| Eastern | New Juaben South | Rejected | | 342 |
| Eastern | Nkawkaw | Joseph Frempong | New Patriotic Party | 27,714 |
| Eastern | Nkawkaw | Frederick Somuah Obeng | National Democratic Congress | 20,697 |
| Eastern | Nkawkaw | Lawoey Benjimain Kwame Ansah | Independent | 290 |
| Eastern | Nkawkaw | Rejected | | 390 |
| Eastern | Nsawam-Adoagyiri | Annoh-Dompreh Frank | New Patriotic Party | 29,640 |
| Eastern | Nsawam-Adoagyiri | Fummey Philibert Amenorpe | National Democratic Congress | 29,433 |
| Eastern | Nsawam-Adoagyiri | Parick Tetteh | Ghana Freedom Party | 92 |
| Eastern | Nsawam-Adoagyiri | Mustapha Rasheed | Independent | 80 |
| Eastern | Nsawam-Adoagyiri | Golo Kojo | Independent | 61 |
| Eastern | Nsawam-Adoagyiri | Rejected | | 473 |
| Eastern | Ofoase/Ayirebi | Kojo Oppong Nkrumah | New Patriotic Party | 18,601 |
| Eastern | Ofoase/Ayirebi | Alfred Osei-Poku | National Democratic Congress | 13,415 |
| Eastern | Ofoase/Ayirebi | Rejected | | 459 |
| Eastern | Okere | Daniel Nana Addo-Kenneth | New Patriotic Party | 12,794 |
| Eastern | Okere | Prince Henry Anim – Owiredu | National Democratic Congress | 8,803 |
| Eastern | Okere | Joseph Kwadwo Afari – Yeboah | Convention People's Party | 324 |
| Eastern | Okere | Rejected | | 208 |
| Eastern | Suhum | Frank Aseidu Bekoe | New Patriotic Party | 16,855 |
| Eastern | Suhum | Prince Addo | National Democratic Congress | 15,259 |
| Eastern | Suhum | Kwadjo Asante | Independent | 14,860 |
| Eastern | Suhum | Emmanuel Dede Wiafe | Independent | 159 |
| Eastern | Suhum | Rejected | | 671 |
| Eastern | Upper Manya Krobo | Bismark Tetteh Nyarko | National Democratic Congress | 14,889 |
| Eastern | Upper Manya Krobo | Joseph Tetteh | New Patriotic Party | 12,443 |
| Eastern | Upper Manya Krobo | Rejected | | 290 |
| Eastern | Upper West Akim | Drah Emmanuel | National Democratic Congress | 22,759 |
| Eastern | Upper West Akim | Frederick Obeng Adom | New Patriotic Party | 15,711 |
| Eastern | Upper West Akim | Rejected | | 370 |
| Eastern | Yilo Krobo | Albert Tetteh Nyakotey | National Democratic Congress | 25,625 |
| Eastern | Yilo Krobo | Richard Twum Barimah Koranteng | New Patriotic Party | 19,122 |
| Eastern | Yilo Krobo | Aseni Ebenzer Tetteh | Convention People's Party | 412 |
| Eastern | Yilo Krobo | Rejected | | 486 |
| Greater Accra | Ablekuma Central | Abdul-Latif Dan | National Democratic Congress | 45,066 |
| Greater Accra | Ablekuma Central | Jefferson Kwamina Sackey | New Patriotic Party | 32,735 |
| Greater Accra | Ablekuma Central | Rejected | | 423 |
| Greater Accra | Ablekuma North | Ewurabena Aubynn | National Democratic Congress | 34,090 |
| Greater Accra | Ablekuma North | Nana Akua Owusu Afriyieh | New Patriotic Party | 33,881 |
| Greater Accra | Ablekuma North | Rejected | | 411 |
| Greater Accra | Ablekuma South | Alfred Okoe Vanderpuije | National Democratic Congress | 35,512 |
| Greater Accra | Ablekuma South | Samuel Sarbah Lartey | New Patriotic Party | 12,744 |
| Greater Accra | Ablekuma South | Joseph Commey | Liberal Party of Ghana | 585 |
| Greater Accra | Ablekuma South | James Lankwei Lamptey | Independent | 413 |
| Greater Accra | Ablekuma South | Rejected | | 337 |
| Greater Accra | Ablekuma West | Kweku Addo | National Democratic Congress | 31,847 |
| Greater Accra | Ablekuma West | Ursula Gifty Owusu – Ekuful | New Patriotic Party | 26,728 |
| Greater Accra | Ablekuma West | Rejected | | 355 |
| Greater Accra | Ada | Comfort Doyoe Cudjoe | National Democratic Congress | 22,019 |
| Greater Accra | Ada | Suzette Naa Norley Dornukie Norteye | New Patriotic Party | 8,119 |
| Greater Accra | Ada | Rejected | | 287 |
| Greater Accra | Adentan | Mohammed Adamu Ramadan | National Democratic Congress | 56,303 |
| Greater Accra | Adentan | Akosua Asaa Manu | New Patriotic Party | 35,143 |
| Greater Accra | Adentan | Razak Al-Hassan | Convention People's Party | 235 |
| Greater Accra | Adentan | Hagar Asiedu | Independent | 232 |
| Greater Accra | Adentan | Rejected | | 378 |
| Greater Accra | Amasaman | Sedem Kwaku Afenyo | National Democratic Congress | 53,759 |
| Greater Accra | Amasaman | Yahya Kassim Atta | New Patriotic Party | 39,525 |
| Greater Accra | Amasaman | Samuel Kwame Denoo | Independent | 1,000 |
| Greater Accra | Amasaman | Jerry-Johnson Nii Armah Ashitey | Independent | 246 |
| Greater Accra | Amasaman | Rejected | | 555 |
| Greater Accra | Anyaa-Sowutuom | Emmanuel Tobbin | New Patriotic Party | 42,790 |
| Greater Accra | Anyaa-Sowutuom | Allotey Emmanuel Adotey | National Democratic Congress | 37,984 |
| Greater Accra | Anyaa-Sowutuom | Rejected | | 491 |
| Greater Accra | Ashaiman | Ernest Henry Norgbey | National Democratic Congress | 65,083 |
| Greater Accra | Ashaiman | Justice King Essiel | New Patriotic Party | 25,927 |
| Greater Accra | Ashaiman | Kudah Gadafi Adam | Independent | 2,261 |
| Greater Accra | Ashaiman | Mantey Emmanuel Felix | Progressive People's Party | 451 |
| Greater Accra | Ashaiman | Heymann Emmanuel Kofi-Yesu | Liberal Party of Ghana | 295 |
| Greater Accra | Ashaiman | Rejected | | 690 |
| Greater Accra | Ayawaso Central | Abdul Rauf Tongym Tubazu | National Democratic Congress | 29,755 |
| Greater Accra | Ayawaso Central | Henry Quartey | New Patriotic Party | 23,345 |
| Greater Accra | Ayawaso Central | Charles Kwame Adams | National Democratic Party | 163 |
| Greater Accra | Ayawaso Central | Rejected | | 287 |
| Greater Accra | Ayawaso East | Mahama Naser Toure | National Democratic Congress | 22,139 |
| Greater Accra | Ayawaso East | Zak Rahman | New Patriotic Party | 9,110 |
| Greater Accra | Ayawaso East | Rejected | | 378 |
| Greater Accra | Ayawaso North | Yussif Issaka Jajah | National Democratic Congress | 25,473 |
| Greater Accra | Ayawaso North | Sannie Ibrahim | New Patriotic Party | 11,278 |
| Greater Accra | Ayawaso North | Rejected | | 235 |
| Greater Accra | Ayawaso West Wuogon | John Setor Dumelo | National Democratic Congress | 40,561 |
| Greater Accra | Ayawaso West Wuogon | Lydia Seyram Alhassan | New Patriotic Party | 27,377 |
| Greater Accra | Ayawaso West Wuogon | Abdul Rauf Abugri Mumuni | Independent | 189 |
| Greater Accra | Ayawaso West Wuogon | Rejected | | 257 |
| Greater Accra | Bortianor-Ngleshie-Amanfro | Okle Felix Akwetey | National Democratic Congress | 37,473 |
| Greater Accra | Bortianor-Ngleshie-Amanfro | Sylvester M, Tetteh | New Patriotic Party | 27,888 |
| Greater Accra | Bortianor-Ngleshie-Amanfro | Frank Mensah | Independent | 347 |
| Greater Accra | Bortianor-Ngleshie-Amanfro | Rejected | | 510 |
| Greater Accra | Dadekotopon | Rita Naa Odoley Sowah | National Democratic Congress | 46,728 |
| Greater Accra | Dadekotopon | Joseph Kwashie Addo | New Patriotic Party | 23,217 |
| Greater Accra | Dadekotopon | Vincent Sowah Odotei | Independent | 2,621 |
| Greater Accra | Dadekotopon | Abbey David Anertey | Independent | 290 |
| Greater Accra | Dadekotopon | Rejected | | 413 |
| Greater Accra | Dome/Kwabenya | Akurugu Faustina Elikplim | National Democratic Congress | 50,967 |
| Greater Accra | Dome/Kwabenya | Michael Aaron Yaw Nii Nortey Oquaye | New Patriotic Party | 50,669 |
| Greater Accra | Dome/Kwabenya | Remy Paa Kow Edmundson | Progressive People's Party | 302 |
| Greater Accra | Dome/Kwabenya | Dora Nyarko | People's National Convention | 220 |
| Greater Accra | Dome/Kwabenya | Rejected | | 624 |
| Greater Accra | Domeabra-Obom | Isaac Awuku Yibor | National Democratic Congress | 22,790 |
| Greater Accra | Domeabra-Obom | Mohammed Abdul-Wahab | New Patriotic Party | 10,445 |
| Greater Accra | Domeabra-Obom | Rejected | | 369 |
| Greater Accra | Korle Klottey | Zanetor Agyeman-Rawlings | National Democratic Congress | 39,997 |
| Greater Accra | Korle Klottey | Valentino Nii Noi Nortey | New Patriotic Party | 23,716 |
| Greater Accra | Korle Klottey | Rejected | | 330 |
| Greater Accra | Kpone-Katamanso | Joseph Akuerteh Tettey | National Democratic Congress | 49,655 |
| Greater Accra | Kpone-Katamanso | William Ofosu Asante | New Patriotic Party | 25,308 |
| Greater Accra | Kpone-Katamanso | Agbane Samson | Progressive People's Party | 658 |
| Greater Accra | Kpone-Katamanso | Edward Amonkwaah Anang | Independent | 174 |
| Greater Accra | Kpone-Katamanso | Rejected | | 414 |
| Greater Accra | Krowor | Agnes Naa Momo Lartey | National Democratic Congress | 39,198 |
| Greater Accra | Krowor | Emmanuel Laryea Odai | New Patriotic Party | 23,116 |
| Greater Accra | Krowor | Duke Afotey Mensah | Independent | 125 |
| Greater Accra | Krowor | Azumah Courage Kwame Mensah | National Democratic Party | 97 |
| Greater Accra | Krowor | Rejected | | 320 |
| Greater Accra | Ledzokuku | Ayiku Benjamin Narteh | National Democratic Congress | 53,375 |
| Greater Accra | Ledzokuku | Bernard Okoe Boye | New Patriotic Party | 42,670 |
| Greater Accra | Ledzokuku | Tagoe Seth Nii Amartey | Convention People's Party | 329 |
| Greater Accra | Ledzokuku | Tekpor Elliot Prosper Kwame | Independent | 106 |
| Greater Accra | Ledzokuku | Lucky Mensah | National Democratic Party | 97 |
| Greater Accra | Ledzokuku | Rejected | | 520 |
| Greater Accra | Madina | Francis- Xavier Kojo Sosu | National Democratic Congress | 56,008 |
| Greater Accra | Madina | Lamptey Robert | New Patriotic Party | 29,777 |
| Greater Accra | Madina | Awal Mohammed | Independent | 727 |
| Greater Accra | Madina | Rejected | | 368 |
| Greater Accra | Ningo-Prampram | Samuel Nartey George | National Democratic Congress | 44,934 |
| Greater Accra | Ningo-Prampram | Michael Tetteh-Eku | New Patriotic Party | 12,182 |
| Greater Accra | Ningo-Prampram | Evans Tetteh Nii Nartey | Independent | 1,404 |
| Greater Accra | Ningo-Prampram | Frederick Forzie | Independent | 275 |
| Greater Accra | Ningo-Prampram | Rejected | | 513 |
| Greater Accra | Odododiodio | Alfred Nii Kotey Ashie | National Democratic Congress | 38,473 |
| Greater Accra | Odododiodio | Sowah Abdul Mannaf | New Patriotic Party | 24,877 |
| Greater Accra | Odododiodio | Alfred Anettey Abbey | Progressive People's Party | 193 |
| Greater Accra | Odododiodio | Richard Dzatei Abbey | Convention People's Party | 175 |
| Greater Accra | Odododiodio | Rejected | | 468 |
| Greater Accra | Okaikwei Central | Patrick Yaw Boamah | New Patriotic Party | 21,099 |
| Greater Accra | Okaikwei Central | Abdulai Abu Baba Abubakar Sadiq | National Democratic Congress | 19,368 |
| Greater Accra | Okaikwei Central | Rejected | | 198 |
| Greater Accra | Okaikwei North | Theresa Lardi Awuni | National Democratic Congress | 28,363 |
| Greater Accra | Okaikwei North | Nana Ama Dokua Asiamah-Adjei | New Patriotic Party | 20,627 |
| Greater Accra | Okaikwei North | Abdul Hamidu Ibrahim Futa | Convention People's Party | 470 |
| Greater Accra | Okaikwei North | Rejected | | 258 |
| Greater Accra | Okaikwei South | Ernest Adomako | National Democratic Congress | 32,691 |
| Greater Accra | Okaikwei South | Dakoa Newman | New Patriotic Party | 24,263 |
| Greater Accra | Okaikwei South | Rejected | | 301 |
| Greater Accra | Sege | Daniel Keshi Bessey | National Democratic Congress | 18,718 |
| Greater Accra | Sege | Dodzie Numekevor | New Patriotic Party | 7,313 |
| Greater Accra | Sege | Lasi Eunice | Independent | 5,827 |
| Greater Accra | Sege | Rejected | | 475 |
| Greater Accra | Shai-Osudoku | Linda Obenewaa Akweley Ocloo | National Democratic Congress | 28,944 |
| Greater Accra | Shai-Osudoku | Benjamin Nargeh | New Patriotic Party | 11,950 |
| Greater Accra | Shai-Osudoku | Gifty Hawa Hammond | Independent | 1,285 |
| Greater Accra | Shai-Osudoku | Minimadey Isaac Gabriel Angmortey | Progressive People's Party | 189 |
| Greater Accra | Shai-Osudoku | Rejected | | 430 |
| Greater Accra | Tema Central | Charles Forson | New Patriotic Party | 18,870 |
| Greater Accra | Tema Central | Ebi Bright | National Democratic Congress | 18,812 |
| Greater Accra | Tema Central | Frederick Aniagyei | Independent | 209 |
| Greater Accra | Tema Central | Rejected | | 144 |
| Greater Accra | Tema East | Odamtten Isaac Ashai | National Democratic Congress | 37,231 |
| Greater Accra | Tema East | Yohane Amarh Ashitey | New Patriotic Party | 23,081 |
| Greater Accra | Tema East | Rejected | | 384 |
| Greater Accra | Tema West | James Enu | National Democratic Congress | 49,225 |
| Greater Accra | Tema West | Denis Amfo Sefah | New Patriotic Party | 27,618 |
| Greater Accra | Tema West | Rejected | | 448 |
| Greater Accra | Trobu | Gloria Owusu | New Patriotic Party | 43,789 |
| Greater Accra | Trobu | John Kofi Halm | National Democratic Congress | 35,147 |
| Greater Accra | Trobu | Sarfo Hammond Adu | Convention People's Party | 310 |
| Greater Accra | Trobu | Oliver Gyepi-Garbrah | Liberal Party of Ghana | 254 |
| Greater Accra | Trobu | Nana Agyenim Boateng | Independent | 206 |
| Greater Accra | Trobu | Francis Ansah Tawiah | All People's Congress | 200 |
| Greater Accra | Trobu | Rejected | | 408 |
| Greater Accra | Weija-Gbawe | Jerry Ahmed Shaib | New Patriotic Party | 32,608 |
| Greater Accra | Weija-Gbawe | Felix Odartey Lamptey | National Democratic Congress | 30,460 |
| Greater Accra | Weija-Gbawe | Ofori Eric Kwaku | Liberal Party of Ghana | 142 |
| Greater Accra | Weija-Gbawe | Saviour Gbedze | Convention People's Party | 95 |
| Greater Accra | Weija-Gbawe | Obeng Fynn George | All People's Congress | 75 |
| Greater Accra | Weija-Gbawe | Rejected | | 319 |
| North East | Bunkpurugu | Bandim Abed-Nego Azumah | National Democratic Congress | 18,639 |
| North East | Bunkpurugu | Solomon Namliit Boar | New Patriotic Party | 17,554 |
| North East | Bunkpurugu | Rejected | | 582 |
| North East | Chereponi | Seidu Alhassan Alajor | National Democratic Congress | 16,972 |
| North East | Chereponi | Tahidu Abdul-Razak | New Patriotic Party | 16,801 |
| North East | Chereponi | Eugene Tamado Koffikan Bashiru | People's National Convention | 114 |
| North East | Chereponi | Rejected | | 447 |
| North East | Nalerigu/Gambaga | Mumuni Muhammed | New Patriotic Party | 34,173 |
| North East | Nalerigu/Gambaga | Issifu Seidu | National Democratic Congress | 29,980 |
| North East | Nalerigu/Gambaga | Seidu Tia Karim | People's National Convention | 318 |
| North East | Nalerigu/Gambaga | Rejected | | 1,065 |
| North East | Walewale | Mahama Tiah Abdul-Kabiru | New Patriotic Party | 36,700 |
| North East | Walewale | Abubakari Abdallah | National Democratic Congress | 31,401 |
| North East | Walewale | Rejected | | 892 |
| North East | Yagaba/Kubori | Mustapha Ussif | New Patriotic Party | 18,917 |
| North East | Yagaba/Kubori | Musah Sibiri Amidu | National Democratic Congress | 11,385 |
| North East | Yagaba/Kubori | Rejected | | 497 |
| North East | Yunyoo | Alhassan Sulemana | National Democratic Congress | 12,014 |
| North East | Yunyoo | Liwaal Oscar | New Patriotic Party | 9,416 |
| North East | Yunyoo | Rejected | | 380 |
| Northern | Bimbilla | Nitiwul Bingab Aduna Dominic | New Patriotic Party | 34,553 |
| Northern | Bimbilla | Joseph Kwabena Manboah-Rockson | National Democratic Congress | 29,240 |
| Northern | Bimbilla | Attah Suale | Progressive People's Party | 2,387 |
| Northern | Bimbilla | Kamil Bamanpong | Independent | 750 |
| Northern | Bimbilla | Rejected | | 1,885 |
| Northern | Gushegu | Alhassan Tampuli Sulemana | New Patriotic Party | 30,490 |
| Northern | Gushegu | Mohammed Yussif Malimali | National Democratic Congress | 29,225 |
| Northern | Gushegu | Rejected | | 1,055 |
| Northern | Karaga | Mohammed Amin Adam | New Patriotic Party | 27,315 |
| Northern | Karaga | Alhassan Sualihu Dandaawa | National Democratic Congress | 21,993 |
| Northern | Karaga | Rejected | | 1,131 |
| Northern | Kpandai | Matthew Nyindam | New Patriotic Party | 27,947 |
| Northern | Kpandai | Daniel Nsala Wakpal | National Democratic Congress | 24,213 |
| Northern | Kpandai | Donkor Eric Nipani | All People's Congress | 104 |
| Northern | Kpandai | Rejected | | 714 |
| Northern | Kumbungu | Hamza Adam | National Democratic Congress | 27,242 |
| Northern | Kumbungu | Abdul-Salam Hamza Fataw | New Patriotic Party | 19,198 |
| Northern | Kumbungu | Rejected | | 481 |
| Northern | Mion | Misbahu Mahama Adams | National Democratic Congress | 20,273 |
| Northern | Mion | Musah Abdul-Aziz Ayaba | New Patriotic Party | 18,066 |
| Northern | Mion | Rejected | | 738 |
| Northern | Nanton | Mohammed Sherif Abdul-Khaliq | National Democratic Congress | 17,077 |
| Northern | Nanton | Mohammed Hardi Tufeiru | New Patriotic Party | 14,506 |
| Northern | Nanton | Rejected | | 250 |
| Northern | Saboba | Bukari Nikpe Joseph | National Democratic Congress | 14,178 |
| Northern | Saboba | Emmanuel Mawanye Kotin | Independent | 9,290 |
| Northern | Saboba | Bintin Charles Binipom | New Patriotic Party | 9,170 |
| Northern | Saboba | Yajabun Janwol Samson | Independent | 71 |
| Northern | Saboba | Rejected | | 895 |
| Northern | Sagnarigu | Atta Issah | National Democratic Congress | 44,530 |
| Northern | Sagnarigu | Felicia Tettey | New Patriotic Party | 15,338 |
| Northern | Sagnarigu | Rejected | | 474 |
| Northern | Savelugu | Abdul Aziz Fatahiya | New Patriotic Party | 27,450 |
| Northern | Savelugu | Abdulai Jacob Iddriss | National Democratic Congress | 24,877 |
| Northern | Savelugu | Haruna Zakaria | People's National Convention | 136 |
| Northern | Savelugu | Rejected | | 559 |
| Northern | Tamale Central | Ibrahim Murtala Muhammed | National Democratic Congress | 52,263 |
| Northern | Tamale Central | Sulemana Salifu | New Patriotic Party | 16,647 |
| Northern | Tamale Central | Rejected | | 806 |
| Northern | Tamale North | Alhassan Sayibu Suhuyini | National Democratic Congress | 28,521 |
| Northern | Tamale North | Abdul-Rahaman Alidu | New Patriotic Party | 12,317 |
| Northern | Tamale North | Hudu Fauziya | Independent | 315 |
| Northern | Tamale North | Rejected | | 239 |
| Northern | Tamale South | Iddrisu Haruna | National Democratic Congress | 67,018 |
| Northern | Tamale South | Fuseini Musah | New Patriotic Party | 20,974 |
| Northern | Tamale South | Haashimiyu Yahaya | Independent | 456 |
| Northern | Tamale South | Kassim Abdul Jalilu | Convention People's Party | 431 |
| Northern | Tamale South | Sualisu Imoro Nabila | People's National Convention | 402 |
| Northern | Tamale South | Rejected | | 852 |
| Northern | Tatale-Sanguli | Ntebe Ayo William | National Democratic Congress | 16,459 |
| Northern | Tatale-Sanguli | Mbomba Thomas | New Patriotic Party | 15,590 |
| Northern | Tatale-Sanguli | Rejected | | 616 |
| Northern | Tolon | Iddrisu Habib | New Patriotic Party | 30,893 |
| Northern | Tolon | Osman Tahidu Damba | National Democratic Congress | 24,772 |
| Northern | Tolon | Rejected | | 582 |
| Northern | Wulensi | Nandaya Yaw Stanley | Independent | 17,432 |
| Northern | Wulensi | Haruna Abdulai | New Patriotic Party | 14,137 |
| Northern | Wulensi | Dawuni Abukari | National Democratic Congress | 11,498 |
| Northern | Wulensi | Rejected | | 846 |
| Northern | Yendi | Abdul-Fatawu Alhassan | National Democratic Congress | 30,770 |
| Northern | Yendi | Umar Farouk Aliu Mahama | New Patriotic Party | 30,441 |
| Northern | Yendi | Hussein Abdul-Karim | Independent | 4,325 |
| Northern | Yendi | Rejected | | 932 |
| Northern | Zabzugu | Alhassan Umar | National Democratic Congress | 15,508 |
| Northern | Zabzugu | Fawaz Aliu | New Patriotic Party | 15,175 |
| Northern | Zabzugu | Obori Bunakpabine Solomon | Independent | 5,135 |
| Northern | Zabzugu | Rejected | | 849 |
| Oti | Akan | Gomado Yao | National Democratic Congress | 18,228 |
| Oti | Akan | Tassah Mustapha Tassah | New Patriotic Party | 11,772 |
| Oti | Akan | Aforla Yawa Mary | Liberal Party of Ghana | 175 |
| Oti | Akan | Rejected | | 376 |
| Oti | Biakoye | Jean-Marie Formadi | National Democratic Congress | 17,760 |
| Oti | Biakoye | Frank Yirenkyi | New Patriotic Party | 9,696 |
| Oti | Biakoye | Paul Kwasi Demends | Liberal Party of Ghana | 97 |
| Oti | Biakoye | Rejected | | 295 |
| Oti | Buem | Adams Iddie Kofi | National Democratic Congress | 17,510 |
| Oti | Buem | Richard Kwadwo Adjei | New Patriotic Party | 4,852 |
| Oti | Buem | Rejected | | 209 |
| Oti | Guan | Agbenyo Fred Kwesi | National Democratic Congress | 9,963 |
| Oti | Guan | Michael Osibo | New Patriotic Party | 2,998 |
| Oti | Guan | Sekor Sussie | National Democratic Party | 82 |
| Oti | Guan | Rejected | | 121 |
| Oti | Krachi East | Nelson Kofi Djabab | National Democratic Congress | 23,530 |
| Oti | Krachi East | Michael Yaw Gyato | New Patriotic Party | 15,345 |
| Oti | Krachi East | Rejected | | 425 |
| Oti | Krachi Nchumuru | Solomon Kuyon | National Democratic Congress | 16,028 |
| Oti | Krachi Nchumuru | James Mamudu | New Patriotic Party | 11,959 |
| Oti | Krachi Nchumuru | Ntana Richmond Uwumborbin | Liberal Party of Ghana | 236 |
| Oti | Krachi Nchumuru | Rejected | | 520 |
| Oti | Krachi West | Helen Adjoa Ntoso | National Democratic Congress | 13,169 |
| Oti | Krachi West | Justice Mensah Amankwa | New Patriotic Party | 10,934 |
| Oti | Krachi West | Charles Bisi Gyamgbuja | Liberal Party of Ghana | 146 |
| Oti | Krachi West | Rejected | | 254 |
| Oti | Nkwanta North | John Kwabena Bless Oti | National Democratic Congress | 25,197 |
| Oti | Nkwanta North | Benjamin Munyum Nador | New Patriotic Party | 22,679 |
| Oti | Nkwanta North | Gabriel Kwabena Donkor | Liberal Party of Ghana | 114 |
| Oti | Nkwanta North | Oduro Aikens Kofi Yeboah | Independent | 65 |
| Oti | Nkwanta North | Rejected | | 765 |
| Oti | Nkwanta South | Geoffrey Kini | National Democratic Congress | 26,543 |
| Oti | Nkwanta South | Sherifa Selina Sekyere-Tijani | New Patriotic Party | 18,385 |
| Oti | Nkwanta South | Nakpatun Obayety Noah | Liberal Party of Ghana | 204 |
| Oti | Nkwanta South | Rejected | | 643 |
| Savannah | Bole-Bamboi | Yusif Sulemana | National Democratic Congress | 26,599 |
| Savannah | Bole-Bamboi | Raphael Kumah Abolasom | New Patriotic Party | 7,426 |
| Savannah | Bole-Bamboi | Rejected | | 521 |
| Savannah | Daboya/Mankarigu | Shaibu Mahama | National Democratic Congress | 12,739 |
| Savannah | Daboya/Mankarigu | Samuel Yeyu Tika | New Patriotic Party | 12,596 |
| Savannah | Daboya/Mankarigu | Rejected | | 628 |
| Savannah | Damongo | Jinapor Samuel Abdulai | New Patriotic Party | 16,222 |
| Savannah | Damongo | Adam Mutawakilu | National Democratic Congress | 14,425 |
| Savannah | Damongo | Saaka Baba Moses | Independent | 66 |
| Savannah | Damongo | Rejected | | 356 |
| Savannah | Salaga North | Alhassan Mumuni | National Democratic Congress | 10,825 |
| Savannah | Salaga North | Alhassan Abdallah Iddi | New Patriotic Party | 8,472 |
| Savannah | Salaga North | Rejected | | 290 |
| Savannah | Salaga South | Zuwera Mohammed Ibrahimah | National Democratic Congress | 21,454 |
| Savannah | Salaga South | Salifu Adam Braimah | New Patriotic Party | 20,164 |
| Savannah | Salaga South | Abraham Mbido Bagyim | Independent | 987 |
| Savannah | Salaga South | Geoffrey Ayidzoe Razak | Independent | 258 |
| Savannah | Salaga South | Rejected | | 665 |
| Savannah | Sawla-Tuna-Kalba | Chiwitey Andrew Dari | National Democratic Congress | 21,418 |
| Savannah | Sawla-Tuna-Kalba | Sankara Kuubeneem Ankaara | New Patriotic Party | 7,340 |
| Savannah | Sawla-Tuna-Kalba | Rejected | | 739 |
| Savannah | Yapei/Kusawgu | John Abdulai Jinapor | National Democratic Congress | 32,086 |
| Savannah | Yapei/Kusawgu | Amadu Zakria | New Patriotic Party | 14,012 |
| Savannah | Yapei/Kusawgu | Awudu Adam | Ghana Union Movement | 720 |
| Savannah | Yapei/Kusawgu | Rejected | | 1,087 |
| Upper East | Bawku Central | Mahama Ayariga | National Democratic Congress | 25,350 |
| Upper East | Bawku Central | Agobiri Paul Alale | New Patriotic Party | 3,855 |
| Upper East | Bawku Central | Anaba Emmanuel | All People's Congress | 308 |
| Upper East | Bawku Central | Rejected | | 6,277 |
| Upper East | Binduri | Mahmoud Issifu | National Democratic Congress | 21,943 |
| Upper East | Binduri | Abanga Abdulai | New Patriotic Party | 7,811 |
| Upper East | Binduri | Amadu Alale | All People's Congress | 160 |
| Upper East | Binduri | Rejected | | 341 |
| Upper East | Bolgatanga Central | Adongo Isaac | National Democratic Congress | 35,101 |
| Upper East | Bolgatanga Central | Elvis Atia Awonekai | New Patriotic Party | 15,470 |
| Upper East | Bolgatanga Central | Akunlibe Peter A, | People's National Convention | 404 |
| Upper East | Bolgatanga Central | Rejected | | 525 |
| Upper East | Bolgatanga East | Dominic Akuritinga Ayine | National Democratic Congress | 12,002 |
| Upper East | Bolgatanga East | Mathew Silas Amoah | New Patriotic Party | 7,415 |
| Upper East | Bolgatanga East | Atiah Edwin | Progressive Alliance for Ghana | 61 |
| Upper East | Bolgatanga East | Rejected | | 182 |
| Upper East | Bongo | Charles Bawaduah | National Democratic Congress | 30,114 |
| Upper East | Bongo | Diana Aduko Aburiya | New Patriotic Party | 9,528 |
| Upper East | Bongo | Rejected | | 617 |
| Upper East | Builsa North | Agalga James | National Democratic Congress | 13,344 |
| Upper East | Builsa North | Alonsi Thomas Kofi | New Patriotic Party | 10,157 |
| Upper East | Builsa North | Asuok Joseph Ransford | People's National Convention | 146 |
| Upper East | Builsa North | Rejected | | 360 |
| Upper East | Builsa South | Clement Abas Apaak | National Democratic Congress | 8,974 |
| Upper East | Builsa South | Daniel Kwame Gariba | New Patriotic Party | 5,061 |
| Upper East | Builsa South | Seidu Christopher Akanzeboka | People's National Convention | 1,639 |
| Upper East | Builsa South | Rejected | | 284 |
| Upper East | Chiana-Paga | Nikyema Billa Alamzy | National Democratic Congress | 22,548 |
| Upper East | Chiana-Paga | Robert Apechira Aloo | New Patriotic Party | 12,884 |
| Upper East | Chiana-Paga | Rejected | | 558 |
| Upper East | Garu | Anabah Thomas Winsum | National Democratic Congress | 17,832 |
| Upper East | Garu | Azumah Georgina Lardi | New Patriotic Party | 7,936 |
| Upper East | Garu | Rejected | | 338 |
| Upper East | Nabdam | Mark Kurt Nawaane | National Democratic Congress | 11,192 |
| Upper East | Nabdam | Ndanbon Charles Taleog | New Patriotic Party | 6,680 |
| Upper East | Nabdam | Rejected | | 278 |
| Upper East | Navrongo Central | Simon Akibange Aworigo | National Democratic Congress | 26,190 |
| Upper East | Navrongo Central | Abdallah Otito Werseh Achuliwor | New Patriotic Party | 12,203 |
| Upper East | Navrongo Central | Rejected | | 495 |
| Upper East | Pusiga | Laadi Ayii Ayamba | National Democratic Congress | 19,557 |
| Upper East | Pusiga | Abdul-Wahab Hanan | New Patriotic Party | 15,798 |
| Upper East | Pusiga | Anaba Simon Paul | All People's Congress | 338 |
| Upper East | Pusiga | Rejected | | 954 |
| Upper East | Talensi | Daniel Dung Mahama | National Democratic Congress | 22,575 |
| Upper East | Talensi | Alibo Robert Ayinenaba | New Patriotic Party | 8,787 |
| Upper East | Talensi | Michael Wombeogo | People's National Convention | 1,497 |
| Upper East | Talensi | Rejected | | 404 |
| Upper East | Tempane | Lydia Lamisi Akanvariba | National Democratic Congress | 19,378 |
| Upper East | Tempane | Joseph Dindiok Kpemka | New Patriotic Party | 13,351 |
| Upper East | Tempane | Rejected | | 623 |
| Upper East | Zebilla | Ebenezer Alumire Ndebilla | National Democratic Congress | 33,657 |
| Upper East | Zebilla | John Kingsley Krugu | New Patriotic Party | 12,879 |
| Upper East | Zebilla | Patience Akparipoka Ndebugre | Independent | 1,413 |
| Upper East | Zebilla | Rejected | | 563 |
| Upper West | Daffiama/Bussie/Issa | Sebastian Ngmenenso Sandaare | National Democratic Congress | 10,448 |
| Upper West | Daffiama/Bussie/Issa | Nadi Imoro Sanda | New Patriotic Party | 7,392 |
| Upper West | Daffiama/Bussie/Issa | Rejected | | 230 |
| Upper West | Jirapa | Cletus Seidu Dapilah | National Democratic Congress | 23,563 |
| Upper West | Jirapa | Aisha Salifu | New Patriotic Party | 6,665 |
| Upper West | Jirapa | Rejected | | 574 |
| Upper West | Lambussie | Titus Kofi Beyuo | National Democratic Congress | 13,551 |
| Upper West | Lambussie | Bright Bakye Yelviel Baligi | New Patriotic Party | 6,079 |
| Upper West | Lambussie | Mohammed Imuran | Liberal Party of Ghana | 138 |
| Upper West | Lambussie | Rejected | | 307 |
| Upper West | Lawra | Bede Anwataazumo Ziedeng | National Democratic Congress | 12,116 |
| Upper West | Lawra | Jacob Domekakpier Dery | New Patriotic Party | 7,351 |
| Upper West | Lawra | Dabuo Baanaah Joseph | Independent | 1,131 |
| Upper West | Lawra | Rejected | | 397 |
| Upper West | Nadowli/Kaleo | Sumah Anthony Mwinkaara | National Democratic Congress | 24,478 |
| Upper West | Nadowli/Kaleo | Kambotuu Francis Xavier | New Patriotic Party | 5,834 |
| Upper West | Nadowli/Kaleo | Rejected | | 313 |
| Upper West | Nandom | Richard Kuuire | National Democratic Congress | 13,743 |
| Upper West | Nandom | Ambrose Dery | New Patriotic Party | 10,706 |
| Upper West | Nandom | Nyine-Kakone Delle Stella Saabedaar | Ghana Union Movement | 114 |
| Upper West | Nandom | Rejected | | 342 |
| Upper West | Sissala East | Mohammed Issah Bataglia | National Democratic Congress | 21,621 |
| Upper West | Sissala East | Issahaku Amidu Chinnia | New Patriotic Party | 10,789 |
| Upper West | Sissala East | Rejected | | 476 |
| Upper West | Sissala West | Mohammed Adams Sukparu | National Democratic Congress | 17,436 |
| Upper West | Sissala West | Salifu Naliwie Baluwie | New Patriotic Party | 12,937 |
| Upper West | Sissala West | Yussif Shaibu | People's National Convention | 202 |
| Upper West | Sissala West | Rejected | | 364 |
| Upper West | Wa Central | Abdul-Rashid Hassan Pelpuo | National Democratic Congress | 38,579 |
| Upper West | Wa Central | Humu Awudu | New Patriotic Party | 30,724 |
| Upper West | Wa Central | Yakubu Zakaria | People's National Convention | 249 |
| Upper West | Wa Central | Rasheed Saeed | Independent | 132 |
| Upper West | Wa Central | Rejected | | 678 |
| Upper West | Wa East | Godfred Seidu Jasaw | National Democratic Congress | 20,402 |
| Upper West | Wa East | Ewurah Suleman Kandia Mahama | New Patriotic Party | 11,816 |
| Upper West | Wa East | Rejected | | 453 |
| Upper West | Wa West | Peter Lanchene Toobu | National Democratic Congress | 25,498 |
| Upper West | Wa West | Saatiri James Kpir-Faatey | New Patriotic Party | 10,162 |
| Upper West | Wa West | Bayong Francis Mwina | People's National Convention | 728 |
| Upper West | Wa West | Rejected | | 624 |
| Volta | Adaklu | Agbodza Kwame Governs | National Democratic Congress | 13,636 |
| Volta | Adaklu | Bright Kwame Nyatsikor | New Patriotic Party | 1,583 |
| Volta | Adaklu | Morti John Shadrack | National Democratic Party | 112 |
| Volta | Adaklu | Rejected | | 126 |
| Volta | Afadjato South | Frank Afriyie | National Democratic Congress | 20,618 |
| Volta | Afadjato South | Etornam James Flolu | New Patriotic Party | 3,459 |
| Volta | Afadjato South | Tegbey Tracy Semanu | Liberal Party of Ghana | 869 |
| Volta | Afadjato South | Rejected | | 137 |
| Volta | Agotime-Ziope | Agbeve Charles Akwasi | National Democratic Congress | 16,500 |
| Volta | Agotime-Ziope | Agbobli Kentle Seth | New Patriotic Party | 2,608 |
| Volta | Agotime-Ziope | John Tepe | National Democratic Party | 237 |
| Volta | Agotime-Ziope | Rejected | | 277 |
| Volta | Akatsi North | Peter Kwasi Nortsu-Kotoe | National Democratic Congress | 10,837 |
| Volta | Akatsi North | Simon Peter Kofi Ofosu | New Patriotic Party | 3,250 |
| Volta | Akatsi North | Rejected | | 187 |
| Volta | Akatsi South | Bernard Ahiafor | National Democratic Congress | 30,268 |
| Volta | Akatsi South | Egos Mawuli Ocloo | New Patriotic Party | 3,399 |
| Volta | Akatsi South | Dzameshie Donald Brown | Progressive Alliance for Ghana | 461 |
| Volta | Akatsi South | Rejected | | 393 |
| Volta | Anlo | Richard Kwami Sefe | National Democratic Congress | 36,419 |
| Volta | Anlo | Seth Kwashie Yormewu | New Patriotic Party | 4,131 |
| Volta | Anlo | Rejected | | 348 |
| Volta | Central Tongu | Alexander Roosevelt Hottordze | National Democratic Congress | 25,437 |
| Volta | Central Tongu | Dzramado Selorm Dramani | Independent | 5,344 |
| Volta | Central Tongu | Godwin Ayikpa | New Patriotic Party | 3,825 |
| Volta | Central Tongu | Akafua-Hotor Courage | National Democratic Party | 266 |
| Volta | Central Tongu | Avudoahor Lawrencia Esenam | Liberal Party of Ghana | 64 |
| Volta | Central Tongu | Rejected | | 369 |
| Volta | Ho Central | Richmond Edem Kofi Kpotosu | National Democratic Congress | 61,138 |
| Volta | Ho Central | Divine Richard Komla Bosson | New Patriotic Party | 5,530 |
| Volta | Ho Central | Mawulorm Kwame Klutse | Independent | 1,980 |
| Volta | Ho Central | Nelson Kofi Vide | National Democratic Party | 93 |
| Volta | Ho Central | Rejected | | 0 |
| Volta | Ho West | Emmanuel Kwasi Bedzrah | National Democratic Congress | 28,110 |
| Volta | Ho West | Eric Nick Yao Gonyuie | New Patriotic Party | 5,043 |
| Volta | Ho West | Kukah Julius Jonathan | National Democratic Party | 352 |
| Volta | Ho West | Rejected | | 270 |
| Volta | Hohoe | Thomas Worlanyo Tsekpo | National Democratic Congress | 31,163 |
| Volta | Hohoe | John-Peter Amewu | New Patriotic Party | 14,971 |
| Volta | Hohoe | Esther Amevor | National Democratic Party | 55 |
| Volta | Hohoe | Stephen Dzidefo Adzraku | People's National Convention | 39 |
| Volta | Hohoe | Rejected | | 314 |
| Volta | Keta | Kwame Dzudzorli Gakpey | National Democratic Congress | 29,471 |
| Volta | Keta | Courage Hope Goldberg-Grimm Lekettey | New Patriotic Party | 2,850 |
| Volta | Keta | Yayra Kwashie Kwawu | Liberal Party of Ghana | 1,030 |
| Volta | Keta | Dugah Stanley Courage | Independent | 123 |
| Volta | Keta | Rejected | | 221 |
| Volta | Ketu North | Eric Edem Agbana | National Democratic Congress | 41,002 |
| Volta | Ketu North | Amegbletor Enoch Kwabla | New Patriotic Party | 5,902 |
| Volta | Ketu North | Hadzah Shelta Ziodofe Kwesi | National Democratic Party | 128 |
| Volta | Ketu North | Pascaline Kassah | Liberal Party of Ghana | 93 |
| Volta | Ketu North | Rejected | | 392 |
| Volta | Ketu South | Abla Dzifa Gomashie | National Democratic Congress | 78,902 |
| Volta | Ketu South | Samuel Wisdom Doe Haligah | New Patriotic Party | 6,033 |
| Volta | Ketu South | Rejected | | 871 |
| Volta | Kpando | Sebastian Fred Deh | National Democratic Congress | 18,326 |
| Volta | Kpando | Kodzosika Samuel | Independent | 4,914 |
| Volta | Kpando | Oklu Antoinette Abena | New Patriotic Party | 1,672 |
| Volta | Kpando | Rejected | | 120 |
| Volta | North Dayi | Joycelyn Tetteh | National Democratic Congress | 12,778 |
| Volta | North Dayi | Edmund Attah Kudjoh | New Patriotic Party | 4,723 |
| Volta | North Dayi | Gloria Yayra Agbenorto | Liberal Party of Ghana | 134 |
| Volta | North Dayi | Rejected | | 80 |
| Volta | North Tongu | Samuel Okudzeto Ablakwa | National Democratic Congress | 41,073 |
| Volta | North Tongu | John Saviour Yaw Eleblu | New Patriotic Party | 3,035 |
| Volta | North Tongu | Rejected | | 275 |
| Volta | South Dayi | Rockson-Nelson Etse Kwami Dafeamekpor | National Democratic Congress | 16,031 |
| Volta | South Dayi | Godwin Kwame Dadzawa | New Patriotic Party | 3,853 |
| Volta | South Dayi | Safo Rose | Liberal Party of Ghana | 94 |
| Volta | South Dayi | Awalime David | Independent | 51 |
| Volta | South Dayi | Rejected | | 139 |
| Volta | South Tongu | Maxwell Kwame Lukutor | National Democratic Congress | 42,881 |
| Volta | South Tongu | Lady Elizabeth Segbenu Agah | New Patriotic Party | 2,620 |
| Volta | South Tongu | Olivia Sosu Quarshie | Progressive Alliance for Ghana | 1,165 |
| Volta | South Tongu | Rejected | | 261 |
| Western | Ahanta West | Mavis Kuukua Bissue | National Democratic Congress | 28,227 |
| Western | Ahanta West | Francis Eric Pobee | New Patriotic Party | 19,663 |
| Western | Ahanta West | Rejected | | 550 |
| Western | Amenfi Central | Joana Gyan Cudjoe | National Democratic Congress | 26,345 |
| Western | Amenfi Central | Albert Wiredu Arkoh | New Patriotic Party | 12,096 |
| Western | Amenfi Central | Peter Yaw Kwakye-Ackah | Independent | 693 |
| Western | Amenfi Central | Karl Mark Arhin | Independent | 56 |
| Western | Amenfi Central | Rejected | | 656 |
| Western | Amenfi East | Nicholas Amankwah | National Democratic Congress | 32,210 |
| Western | Amenfi East | Ernest Frimpong | New Patriotic Party | 23,702 |
| Western | Amenfi East | Rejected | | 629 |
| Western | Amenfi West | Eric Afful | National Democratic Congress | 26,659 |
| Western | Amenfi West | Ignatius Kwasi Afrifa | New Patriotic Party | 17,953 |
| Western | Amenfi West | Rejected | | 571 |
| Western | Effia | Isaac Boamah-Nyarko | New Patriotic Party | 15,870 |
| Western | Effia | Abdul-Majeed Iddrisu Nassam | National Democratic Congress | 13,892 |
| Western | Effia | Rejected | | 158 |
| Western | Ellembele | Emmanuel Armah-Kofi Buah | National Democratic Congress | 32,281 |
| Western | Ellembele | Kwasi Bonzoh | New Patriotic Party | 18,608 |
| Western | Ellembele | Asmah John Nkum | Progressive People's Party | 132 |
| Western | Ellembele | Rejected | | 462 |
| Western | Essikado-Ketan | Grace Ayensu-Danquah | National Democratic Congress | 26,166 |
| Western | Essikado-Ketan | Charles Cromwell Nanabanyin Onuawonto Bissue | New Patriotic Party | 17,754 |
| Western | Essikado-Ketan | Rejected | | 337 |
| Western | Evalue Ajomoro Gwira | Nokoe Kofi Arko | National Democratic Congress | 16,419 |
| Western | Evalue Ajomoro Gwira | Catherine Abelema Afeku | New Patriotic Party | 14,050 |
| Western | Evalue Ajomoro Gwira | Elisha Joshua Kabenlah | Independent | 240 |
| Western | Evalue Ajomoro Gwira | Rejected | | 429 |
| Western | Jomoro | Dorcas Toffey | National Democratic Congress | 25,349 |
| Western | Jomoro | Paul Essien | New Patriotic Party | 14,195 |
| Western | Jomoro | Nkrumah Samia Yaba Christina | Independent | 8,065 |
| Western | Jomoro | Nana Blay Mienzah | Convention People's Party | 269 |
| Western | Jomoro | Rejected | | 719 |
| Western | Kwesimintsim | Buckman Philip Fiifi | National Democratic Congress | 15,927 |
| Western | Kwesimintsim | Prince Hamidu Armah | New Patriotic Party | 13,317 |
| Western | Kwesimintsim | Joseph Mensah | Independent | 1,835 |
| Western | Kwesimintsim | Rejected | | 219 |
| Western | Mpohor | Bentil Godfred Henry | National Democratic Congress | 11,680 |
| Western | Mpohor | John Kobina Abbam Aboah Sanie | New Patriotic Party | 8,299 |
| Western | Mpohor | Theresa Kwaw | Liberal Party of Ghana | 92 |
| Western | Mpohor | Rejected | | 198 |
| Western | Prestea Huni-Valley | Robert Wisdom Cudjoe | National Democratic Congress | 46,792 |
| Western | Prestea Huni-Valley | Barbara Oteng-Gyasi | New Patriotic Party | 30,395 |
| Western | Prestea Huni-Valley | Hammond Eric Oduro | Independent | 1,131 |
| Western | Prestea Huni-Valley | Rejected | | 778 |
| Western | Sekondi | Blay Nyameke Armah | National Democratic Congress | 14,558 |
| Western | Sekondi | Andrew Kofi Egyapa Mercer | New Patriotic Party | 11,084 |
| Western | Sekondi | Rejected | | 176 |
| Western | Shama | Emelia Arthur | National Democratic Congress | 23,043 |
| Western | Shama | Isaac Kwamina Afful | New Patriotic Party | 17,082 |
| Western | Shama | Rejected | | 429 |
| Western | Takoradi | Kwabena Okyere Darko-Mensah | New Patriotic Party | 16,413 |
| Western | Takoradi | Faidoo Frederick Faustinus | National Democratic Congress | 1,517 |
| Western | Takoradi | Rejected | | 290 |
| Western | Tarkwa Nsuaem | Issa Salifu Taylor | National Democratic Congress | 35,820 |
| Western | Tarkwa Nsuaem | George Mireku Duker | New Patriotic Party | 27,474 |
| Western | Tarkwa Nsuaem | Joy Joycelyn Andoh | Independent | 12,795 |
| Western | Tarkwa Nsuaem | Rejected | | 609 |
| Western | Wassa East | Isaac Adjei Mensah | National Democratic Congress | 20,172 |
| Western | Wassa East | Mona Gertrude Effah | New Patriotic Party | 13,223 |
| Western | Wassa East | Rejected | | 448 |
| Western North | Aowin | Oscar Ofori Larbi | National Democratic Congress | 21,889 |
| Western North | Aowin | Abanga Yakubu Fusani | New Patriotic Party | 21,786 |
| Western North | Aowin | Rejected | | 663 |
| Western North | Bia East | Richard Acheampong | National Democratic Congress | 12,948 |
| Western North | Bia East | Nicholas Kupog Yayin | New Patriotic Party | 8,351 |
| Western North | Bia East | Rejected | | 551 |
| Western North | Bia West | Tanko Mustapha Amadu | National Democratic Congress | 27,387 |
| Western North | Bia West | Bernard Gyebi Blay | New Patriotic Party | 11,815 |
| Western North | Bia West | Rejected | | 495 |
| Western North | Bibiani-Anhwiaso-Bekwai | Bright Asamoah Brefo | National Democratic Congress | 33,732 |
| Western North | Bibiani-Anhwiaso-Bekwai | Alfred Obeng-Boateng | New Patriotic Party | 31,749 |
| Western North | Bibiani-Anhwiaso-Bekwai | Rejected | | 531 |
| Western North | Bodi | Ahi Sampson | National Democratic Congress | 13,086 |
| Western North | Bodi | Andoh Nicholas | New Patriotic Party | 9,230 |
| Western North | Bodi | Rejected | | 245 |
| Western North | Juaboso | Kwabena Mintah Akandoh | National Democratic Congress | 20,724 |
| Western North | Juaboso | Alexander Ampaabeng | New Patriotic Party | 18,672 |
| Western North | Juaboso | Oppong Ernestina | Convention People's Party | 92 |
| Western North | Juaboso | Rejected | | 511 |
| Western North | Sefwi Akontombra | Pious Kwame Nkuah | National Democratic Congress | 16,693 |
| Western North | Sefwi Akontombra | Djornobuah Alex Tetteh | New Patriotic Party | 13,486 |
| Western North | Sefwi Akontombra | Rejected | | 237 |
| Western North | Sefwi Wiawso | Afful Kofi Benteh | National Democratic Congress | 33,656 |
| Western North | Sefwi Wiawso | Festus Bumakama Agyapong | New Patriotic Party | 24,926 |
| Western North | Sefwi Wiawso | Ababio Veronica | Independent | 164 |
| Western North | Sefwi Wiawso | Rejected | | 565 |
| Western North | Suaman | Addy Frederick | New Patriotic Party | 9,027 |
| Western North | Suaman | Joseph Betino | National Democratic Congress | 8,214 |
| Western North | Suaman | John Asare | Liberal Party of Ghana | 61 |
| Western North | Suaman | Rejected | | 193 |
