= 2025 Ablekuma North parliamentary election rerun =

2025 rerun parliamentary election in Ablekuma North, Ghana

- 11 July 2025

Ablekuma North constituency
	First party	Second party
Candidate	Ewurabena Aubynn	Nana Akua Owusu Afriyie
Party	NDC	NPP
Popular vote	34,090	33,881
Member of Parliament before election
Sheila Penelope Bartels
New Patriotic Party (Ghana)
Elected Member of Parliament
Ewurabena Aubynn
NDC

2025 Ablekuma North parliamentary election rerun was held on 11 July 2025 in the Ablekuma North constituency of Ghana’s Greater Accra Region. The rerun took place in 19 polling stations following a legal dispute and the Electoral Commission’s inability to complete results collation from the original 2024 general election. Ewurabena Aubynn of the National Democratic Congress (NDC) won the rerun, marking the first time the NDC had secured the constituency since the start of Ghana's Fourth Republic.

== Background ==
The original parliamentary election in Ablekuma North was held on 7 December 2024 as part of Ghana's general election. However, the Electoral Commission (EC) was unable to finalize the results due to issues with the scanning and collation of pink sheets from 19 polling stations.

On 4 January 2025, the Accra High Court ruled that the EC could complete collation using the outstanding results from the three remaining polling stations. However, the EC later determined that a rerun in all 19 affected polling stations was necessary to ensure transparency and credibility, citing procedural irregularities.

== Legal challenge ==
The New Patriotic Party (NPP), whose candidate Nana Akua Owusu Afriyie was narrowly leading in preliminary tallies, filed an application to restrain the EC from conducting the rerun. On 9 July 2025, the High Court dismissed the NPP's injunction request, clearing the way for the rerun to proceed.

== Election day incidents ==
The rerun took place on 11 July 2025 in 19 polling stations. Although voting proceeded generally peacefully, some incidents of intimidation and violence were reported. NPP candidate Nana Akua Owusu Afriyie and former Minister Mavis Hawa Koomson were allegedly assaulted by unidentified individuals at St. Peter's polling station in Odorkor.

== Results ==
After the completion of voting and collation, Ewurabena Aubynn of the NDC was declared the winner. She obtained 34,090 votes, defeating Nana Akua Owusu Afriyie of the NPP who garnered 33,881 votes. The margin of victory was 209 votes.

== Significance ==
The result marked a historic shift in the constituency's political landscape. Since the start of Ghana's Fourth Republic in 1993, Ablekuma North had consistently been held by the NPP. The victory gave the NDC additional representation in Parliament and was interpreted by analysts as a sign of shifting voter sentiment in urban constituencies.

== See also ==
- 2024 Ghanaian general election
- Electoral Commission of Ghana
- Parliament of Ghana
