= Progressive Alliance for Ghana =

Ghanaian political party

- Abbreviation: PAG
- Leader: John Kpikpi
- Chairperson: Thaddeus P. Ulzen
- General Secretary: Kofi Roberts
- Founded: 1 July 2024
- Ideology: Nkrumaism
- Colours: Yellow; Purple
- Slogan: Forward Together

Website
- www.joinpag.org

The Progressive Alliance for Ghana is a political party in Ghana.

== History ==
The party was formed to forward the ideas of Kwame Nkrumah, the first President of Ghana. A group of Ghanaians in North America came together to form the Concerned Nkrumahists of North America (CNNA). It initially set about trying to unite the various parties in Ghana who followed Nkrumah's ideology. The parties include the Convention People's Party (CPP), the People's National Convention (PNC) and the Progressive People's Party (PPP). After these efforts failed, they decided to form their own party. In 2018, in association with the Social Justice Movement of Ghana (SJMG), they decided to start a political party to promote Nkrumah's ideas. Other grassroots Nkrumah organisations were also involved. They announced that they would be inaugurating the party on 1 July 2024 at Cape Coast.

== 2024 election ==
In August 2024, John Enyonam Kwakwu Kpikpi was announced as the presidential candidate of the party. He filed nomination papers for the 2024 Ghanaian general election with the Electoral Commission of Ghana. Kpikpi was one of three applicants from political parties who were disqualified from standing for the presidential election by the Electoral Commission.

== Election results ==
Election	Leader	Votes	%	Seats	+/–	Position	Result
2024	John Kpikpi	1,957	0.02%	0 / 276	New	9th	Extra-parliamentary

== See also ==
- List of political parties in Ghana
