= Nana Akosua Frimpomaa =

Ghanaian politician

Convention People's Party Leader
- Incumbent
- Assumed office 2024
- Preceded by: Ivor Greenstreet

Personal details
- Born: 5 February 1956 (age 70) Accra
- Party: Convention People's Party
- Education: Mfantsiman Girls' Senior High School; University of Notre Dame

Nana Akosua Frimpomaa is a Ghanaian politician. She is the leader of the Convention People's Party and was their presidential candidate in the 2024 Ghanaian general election.

== Early life and education ==
Frimpomaa was born in February 1956 in Accra but her parents hails from Dormaa. She attended the Mfantsiman Girls' Secondary School at Saltpond. She continued her education at the Kumasi Polytechnic (now Kumasi Technical University where she obtained a Diploma in Business Studies. She later proceeded to the United States to further her education. She studied at various institutions including the Washington School for Secretaries, the Montgomery Community College and the University of Notre Dame.

== Career ==
Frimpomaa worked on the staff of Working Mothers Incorporated, an employment agency in the United States. She worked with the Optimum Care Agency also in the United States which recruited nurses for various institutions. She also worked with the University of Maryland Early Childhood Department. She was involved in developing a programme for integrated babysitting into undergraduate studies there.

Back in Ghana, she founded the Caring Kids International which was dedicated to education of children and youth in Ghana. She was one of the founding members of the 31st December Women's movement which was led by Nana Konadu Agyeman Rawlings and served as the National Organizer. She founded other organisations, namely the Youth in Excellence Service for Mother Ghana (YES), a volunteer youth corp that encouraged reading clubs and the Human Potential Community College. The reading club idea was adopted by Christine Churcher who was then the Minister for Education (Ghana).

Frimpomaa was involved in philanthropy with supporting education in the Kadjebi District in the Oti Region and financial and educational support in the Dormaa Central Municipal District in the Bono Region.

== Politics ==
In 2024, Frimpomaa was nominated by the CPP to be its presidential candidate. She filed her papers with the Electoral Commission of Ghana on 12 September 2024. She pledged policies based on the foundation set by Kwame Nkrumah, founder of the party and first president of Ghana. She came fifth in the presidential election with 0.2% of the vote.

Party political offices
Preceded by Ivor Greenstreet	Convention People's Party presidential candidate 2024	Incumbent
