= Kwaku Ampratwum-Sarpong =

Ghanaian politician (b. 1958)

Hon. Kwaku Ampratwum-Sarpong
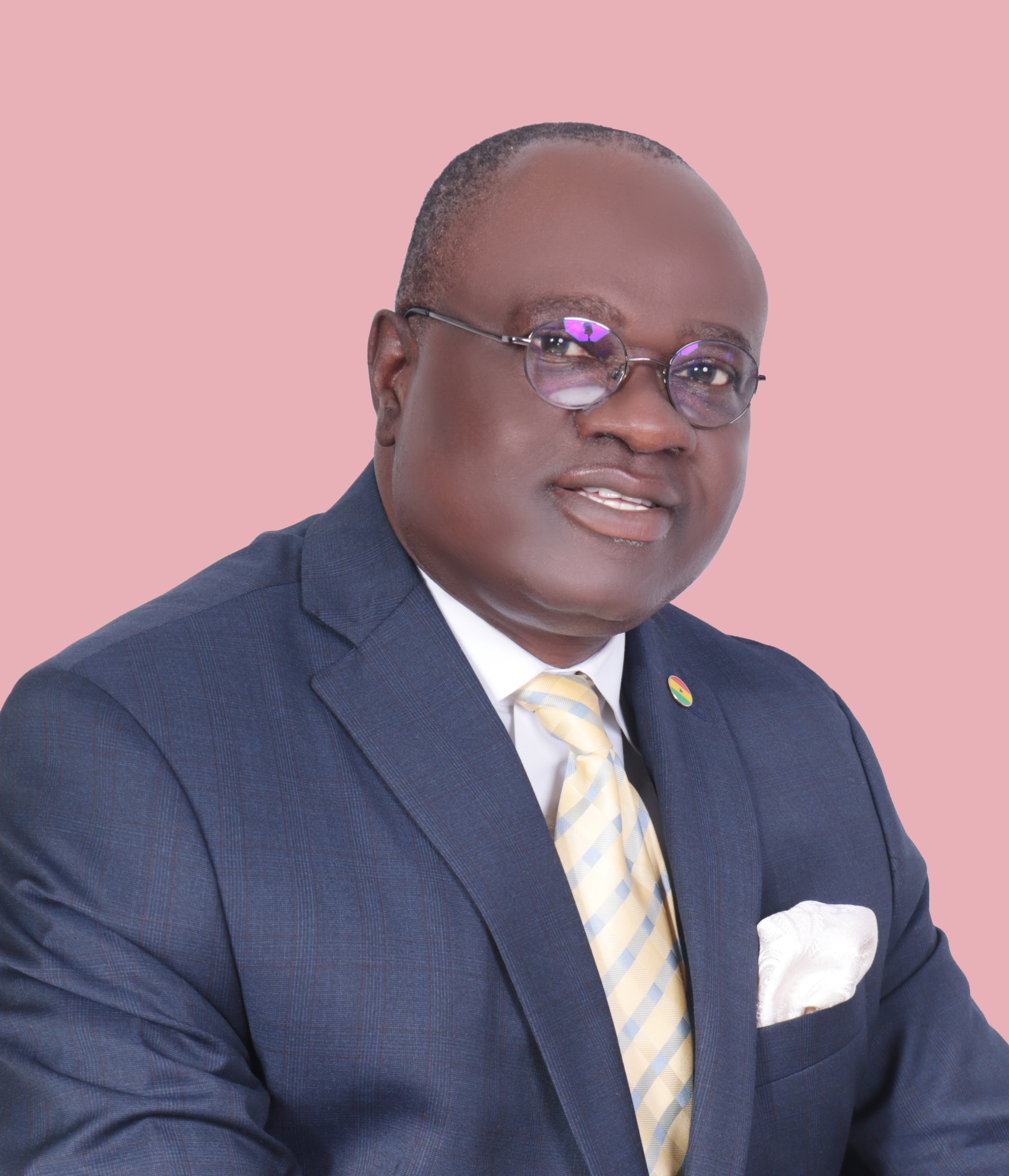

Member of the Ghana Parliament for Mampong Constituency
- Majority: yes

Deputy Minister for Foreign Affairs and Regional Integration (Political and Economic)
- President: Nana Akuffo-Addo

Personal details
- Born: Kwaku Ampratwum-Sarpong; 8 January 1958 (age 68) Mampong, Ghana
- Party: New Patriotic Party
- Spouse: yes
- Children: three
- Education: University of Westminster, London
- Occupation: Consultant
- Profession: Consultant
- Committees: Special Budget Committee, Trade, Industry and Tourism Committee

Kwaku Ampratwum-Sarpong is a Ghanaian politician and member of the Seventh Parliament of the Fourth Republic of Ghana and the Eight Parliament of the Fourth Republic of Ghana representing the Mampong Constituency in the Ashanti Region on the ticket of the New Patriotic Party. He is currently the Deputy Minister for Foreign Affairs and Regional Integration.

== Early life and education ==
Kwaku Ampratwum-Sarpong was born on January 8, 1958, in Mampong in the Ashanti Region. He holds a post graduate diploma in Housing Management from the University of Westminster, London. He underwent his undergraduate studies at the University of Ghana where he attained a B.A.(Hons) Degree. He also has an advanced executive certificate from the Graduate School of Governance and Leadership in Accra, Ghana. Ampratwum-Sarpong is also an associate member of the Chartered Institute of Housing and the Institute of Directors in the United Kingdom.

== Career ==
Kwaku Ampratwum-Sarpong was the Deputy High Commissioner to Ghana's Foreign Affairs Ministry from 2006 to 2009 and also the executive director of the Ghana-India Business Network, Accra. He is the Vice Chairman of the Foreign Affairs Committee in Parliament. Before his move into politics, Ampratwum-Sarpong was the divisional service manager at Hanover in Hackney Ltd, UK from 2002 to 2005. From 1991 to 2002 at the London Brough of Hackney, UK, he was also the divisional service manager. From 1990 to 1991 he was the senior administration officer at the London Brough of Lambeth, UK.

== Politics ==
He is a member of the New Patriotic Party and the member of parliament for the Mampong Constituency. He won the parliamentary seat for the Mampong Constituency during the 2016 elections with 36,532 votes out of the 48,085 valid votes cast. Mohammed Kojo Aboasu of National Democratic Congress, Rebecca Otum of People's Patriotic Party, Osei Kofi Edward Adepa of United Front Party, Ahmed Ibraham Saleh of People's National Convention, Christopher Adansi Bona of Convention People's Party, and Richmond Akuoko of Great Consolidated People's Party were the other aspirants. He again won the parliamentary seat for the Mampong Constituency during the 2020 elections with 36,159 votes making 69.8% of the valid votes cast. Frank Amoakohene of National Democratic Congress had 14,070 votes making 27.2% of the total votes cast whiles Bright Adomako, an Independent candidate had 1,576 votes making 3% of the total votes cast.

=== Committees ===
He is a member of the Trade, Industry and Tourism Committee and also a member of the Special Budget Committee.

== Personal life ==
He is married with three children. Kwaku Ampratwum-Sarpong identifies as a Christian. He likes fishing, watching football, reading and listening to classical music.
