= Janet Nabla =

Ghanaian politician

Presidential candidate

Mrs

General Secretary

Personal details
- Citizenship: Ghana
- Party: People's National Party
- Other political affiliations: People's National Convention
- Profession: Health Administrator

Janet Asana Nabla is a Ghanaian politician. She was the Presidential candidate for People's National Party in the 2024 Ghanaian general election. Nabla was disqualified due to errors in her filing papers. In a released statement, the party's general secretary said they would not appeal the decision but would instead focus on receiving the final certificate to operate as a fully fledged political party.

== Politics ==
=== People's National Convention ===
Nabla was at one time General Secretary for People's National Convention.

==== Presidential bid ====
Nabla was named flagbearer for the People's National Party (PNP) after the party's National Executive Committee's meeting on 1 September 2024. Nabla was a candidate for President in Ghana with Dr. Ayesu as her running mate John Dramani Mahama emerged as Ghana’s President following the election held on 7 December 2024 in Ghana.

She is currently the chairperson of the People's National Party (PNP) and believes the party will lead the country in 2028.

== See also ==
- 2024 Ghanaian General election
- Politics of Ghana
