= Kofi Koranteng =

Ghanaian activist and politician (born 1966)

Personal details
- Born: 9 September 1966 (age 60) Accra, Greater Accra Region, Ghana
- Party: Independent
- Education: New York University
- Website: Official website

Kofi Koranteng (born 9 September 1966) is a Ghanaian activist and politician who was the chief executive officer of the Progressive Alliance Movement. He has been an advocate for the rights of Ghanaians living abroad to be given the chance to vote through campaigning for the Representation of the Peoples’ Amendment Act (ROPAA) to be passed. In the run-up to the election in December 2019, he declared his intention to stand for the 2020 Ghana elections as an independent candidate.

== Education ==
Koranteng attended Primary School in Accra at Aggrey Memorial, continuing his schooling in Kumasi at Garrison Primary. He had his Senior High School Education from college at Adisadel College in Cape Coast. He has a degree in economics and business from New York University,

== Career ==
He was chief executive officer of the Progressive Alliance Movement, a US based non-political advocacy group. Through that he was a lead campaigner of the advocacy group campaigning for the passage of the Representation of the Peoples’ Amendment Act (ROPAA). The ROPAA act is an act that would allow other Ghanaians living abroad to take part in elections. Based on that the ROPAA amendment act has been considered as a necessary act of legislation that needs to be passed in the Ghanaian parliament even though it is yet to be passed. During his career, he was a Vice President at Primerica, founder and lead consultant for Dividends Inc and also was a Business Development Officer for JP Morgan Chase.

Koranteng has also worked on the following institutions:

- First President of Ahenfie Association – A Ghanaian community-based organization fusing Ghanaian culture with American lifestyle
- Past President of Tracey Towers – an 871-unit apartment complex in New York
- Was on the Leadership Board of four organizations as a facilitator and consultant including the African Advisory Council of the Borough President of the Bronx and the United African Congress.
- Past President and CEO of Volta Power FM Radio – a responsible corporate citizen that stimulated the economic growth of its members and community through high-quality networking events, professional development opportunities, community service and commerce programs and forums.
- Chief Executive Officer and major partner of Highlife Management LLC. – a community private equity firm
- President and CEO of Africa Business Advisory Group (ABAG) – a leading international consulting firm with a focus in African business advisory based in New York.
- Current CEO of Progressive Alliance Movement (PAM), – a non-political, non-ethnic and non-religious entity advocating for the human rights of Ghanaians Living Abroad (GLA’s) which recently challenge the Electoral Commission in Ghana to institute voting rights as per law.

== Politics ==
=== Presidential bid ===
==== Elections 2020 ====
In December 2019, Koranteng declared his intentions to stand the 2020 Ghana elections as an independent Candidate. He equated his reasons for taking that decision to the fact that the two major political parties, the National Democratic Congress and the New Patriotic Party have for a long period in government run Ghana like an organized crime syndicate and that it was time to kick them out.

On 19 October 2020, The Electoral Commission disqualified 6 candidates which included Kofi Koranteng on the instances of forged signatures and manufacturing of endorsees, the Electoral Commission found out that 19 signatures signed endorsing him were fake and had been forwarded to the Police Criminal Investigation Department (CID) for further investigations. The Criminal Investigation Department of the Ghana Police Service (CID) later confirmed that the 29 signatures were fake, hence his disqualification.

The Electoral Commission issued a statement that the GHS100,000 filing fee by all 6 disqualified candidates would be refunded. He filed a case against the Electoral Commission but on 30 November 2020 the Accra High presided over by Justice Gifty Agyei-Addo dismissed his case.
