= Mampong (Ghana parliament constituency) =

Constituency in the Ashanti Region of Ghana

- constituency for the Parliament of Ghana
- District: Mampong Municipal District
- Region: Ashanti Region of Ghana

Current constituency
- Party: New Patriotic Party
- MP: Kwaku Ampratwum-Sarpong

Mampong is one of the constituencies represented in the Parliament of Ghana. Mampong is located in Ashanti Region.

Kwaku Ampratwum-Sarpong has been the Member of Parliament for the constituency since 2016. He was elected on the ticket of the New Patriotic Party (NPP) won a majority of 20,472 votes to become the MP. He succeeded Francis Addai Nimoh who had represented the constituency in the 4th Republic parliament.

== List of Members of Parliament ==
Election	Member	Party	Ref
1996	Solomon K.sarfoh	New Patriotic Party	
2000	Solomon K.sarfoh	New Patriotic Party	
2004	Peter A. Sarkodie	New Patriotic Party	
2008	Francis A. Nimoh	New Patriotic Party	
2012	Francis A. Nimoh	New Patriotic Party	
2016	Kwaku Ampratwum Sarpong	New Patriotic Party	
2020	Kwaku Ampratwum Sarpong	New Patriotic Party	
2024			

== See also ==
- List of Ghana Parliament constituencies
