= Francis Addai-Nimoh =

Ghanaian politician

Member of the Ghana Parliament for Mampong Constituency
- In office 7 January 2013 – 6 January 2017

Personal details
- Born: March 23, 1965 (age 61)
- Party: New Patriotic Party
- Education: Kwame Nkrumah University of Science and Technology

Francis Addai-Nimoh (born March 23, 1965) is a Ghanaian politician and a member of the Sixth Parliament of the Fourth Republic of Ghana. He represented the Mampong Constituency in the Ashanti Region on the ticket of the New Patriotic Party.

== Personal life ==
He identifies as a Christian and is married with three children.

== Early life and education ==
Addai-Nimoh was born on March 23, 1965. He hails from Mampong-Nyinampong, a town in the Ashanti Region of Ghana. He attended the Kwame Nkrumah University of Science and Technology where he obtained a Bachelor of Science degree in Civil Engineering in 1993. He also attended the Ghana Institute of Management and Public Administration and obtained an executive master's degree in Public Administration.

== Career ==
Addai-Nimoh is a Development planner by profession. He is also a civil engineer.

== Politics ==
Addai-Nimoh is a member of the New Patriotic Party (NPP). In 2012, he contested for the Mampong seat on the ticket of the NPP in the 2012 Ghanaian general elections and won. He also served as a Member of parliament for Mampong between 2008 and 2016. He contested in the NPP's presidential primaries in 2014. He lost the bid to represent the party in 2015 parliamentary primaries. In the Annual National Delegates Conference 2022, Mr Nimoh predicted surprises of seeing new faces in the leadership of the NPP. He has in recent times joined the race for the NPP flagbearership for the 2024 elections. He, however, lost the election, coming in 4th out of four contestants.
