= Ewurabena Aubynn =

Ghanaian politician

Ewurabena Aubynn is a Ghanaian politician and the Member of Parliament for the Ablekuma North Constituency in the Greater Accra Region of Ghana.
