= Asiedu Walker =

Ghanaian political candidate

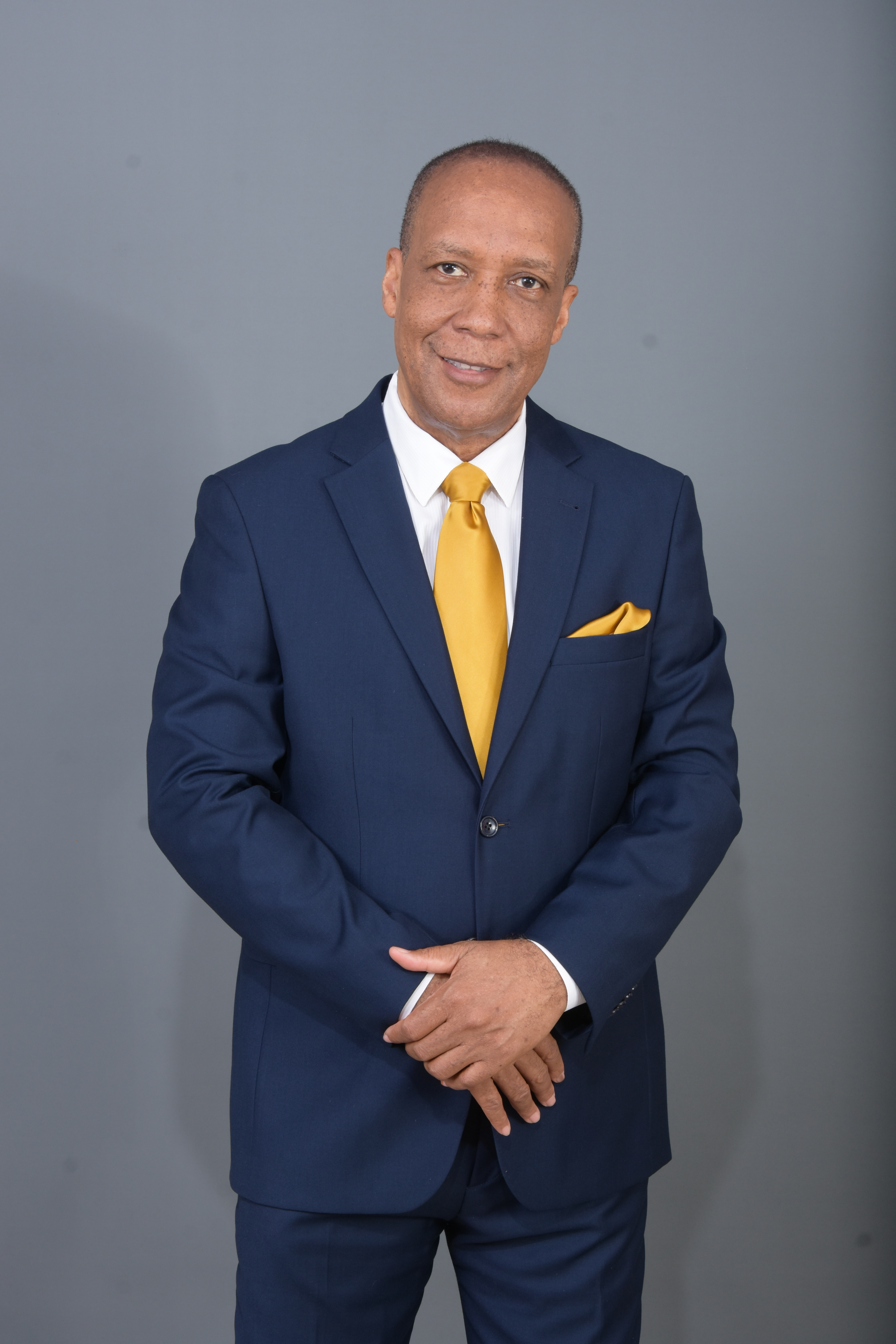

Independent candidate for President of Ghana
- Election date 7 December 2020
- Running mate: Jacob Osei Yeboah
- Opponents: Nana Akufo-Addo (NPP); John Mahama (NDC) and 9 others
- Incumbent: Nana Akufo-Addo (NPP)

Personal details
- Born: Alfred Kwame Asiedu Walker; 24 December 1955 (age 70) Larteh Akuapem, Ghana
- Party: Independent
- Parents: Nana Kwame Okanta Obrantiri (father); Beatrice Amma Adobea Quashie (mother)
- Occupation: Politician

Alfred Kwame Asiedu Walker was an independent presidential candidate in Ghana.

== Early life and education ==
Alfred was the youngest of nine children in his family. His parents were Nana Kwame Okanta Obrantiri, who was the King of Larteh Akuapem. His mother Beatrice Amma Adobea Quashie, was the daughter of the King of Anum-Boso. He was born at Larteh Akwapem. His secondary education was at the Ghana National College at Cape Coast in the Central Region. He then went on to the United States where he studied at the University of Illinois where he graduated with a dual Major in Industrial design in 1983. He also had further studies at the North Carolina State University.

== Work ==
Alfred founded a private infrastructure development company which was involved in several public–private partnership projects.

== Politics ==
Alfred decided to contest the 2016 Ghanaian general election as an independent candidate. He filed nomination papers with the Electoral Commission of Ghana. He was however disqualified from contesting by the Electoral Commission due to anomalies with his nomination papers which did not satisfy Regulation 9(2) of Constitutional Instrument (CI) 94. He unsuccessfully contested this in court prior to the election.

In October 2020, he successfully filed nomination papers to contest the 2020 Ghanaian general election as an independent candidate for the position of President of Ghana. His running mate for the election was Jacob Osei Yeboah who had contested previous elections as an independent candidate and had indicated that he was going to do the same but changed his mind at the time nominations were being filed when he backed out and announced he will be backing Walker instead. He declared that he would be happy to use his first salary during his first year as president for charity. He has also made a commitment to having a smaller government than exists now with a maximum of 25 Ministers and other measures to help reduce government expenditure.
