= List of rulers of the Akan state of Akuapem Guan =

For the history of Ghana, here is the list of rulers of the Akan state of Akuapem Guan.

Tenure	Incumbent	Notes
Akuapemhene (rulers)
Aduana dynasty
ante/c.1998 to present	Nana Asiedu Okoo Ababio III, Akuapem Guanmanhene

The Guan are believed to have begun to migrate from the Mossi region of modern Burkina Faso around A.D. 1000. Moving gradually through the Volta valley in a southerly direction, they created settlements along the Black Volta, throughout the Afram Plains, in the Volta Gorge, and in the Akuapem Hills before moving farther south onto the coastal plains. Some scholars postulate that the wide distribution of the Guan suggests that they were the Neolithic population of the region. Later migrations by other groups such as the Akan, Ewe, and Ga-Adangbe into Guan-settled areas would then have led to the development of Guan-speaking enclaves along the Volta and within the coastal plains. The Guan have been heavily influenced by their neighbours. The Efutu, a subgroup of the Guan, for example, continue to speak Guan dialects, but have adopted (with modifications) the Fante version of some Akan institutions and the use of some Fante words in their rituals. As far as the other Guan subgroups are concerned, the Anum-Boso speak a local Ewe dialect, whereas the Larteh and Kyerepong have customs similar to Akwapim groups.

Constituting about a quarter of the Guan, the Gonja to the north have also been influenced by other groups. The Gonja are ruled by members of a dynasty, probably Mande in origin. The area is peopled by a variety of groups, some of which do not speak Guan. The ruling dynasty, however, does speak Guan, as do substantial numbers of commoners. Although neither the rulers nor most of the commoners are Muslims, a group of Muslims accompanied the Mande invaders and have since occupied a special position as scribes and traders.

Led by their leader Gyedu Nkansa, a quarter of the Guan settled in present-day Akuapem mountains. Prior to the founding of Akuapem State, the institution of chieftaincy as we know of today was non-existent. The leadership of highland community made up mainly of Guans and the Kyerepongs consisted of priests and priestesses. Nana Offei Kwasi Agyeman of the Aduana fame, a trader from Gyakiti, and a chief in his own right, had already left Akwamu with his people to live at a village called Adenya. Surrounded by his band of Mpoti Asafo with their proverbial seven guns. He later settled at Boampong (Kaabi) the northern part of present-day Akropong. When the Akwamus' brutalities on the Guans and the Kyerepongs had gone beyond control and intolerable, the leadership had these settlers summon a meeting to chart and discuss a way out of their predicaments. Gyadu Nkansa, then the king of the Guans and in that capacity the leader of Akuapem, in his old age and at his hour of death just at the beginning of his successor Ohene Berentiri gave authority to Ofei Agyemang, chief of Gyakiti and Sediesa (Asare Diedsa), chief of the Kyerepongs to extend an invitation to the Akims for assistance to fight the Akwamus. The delegation to Akim was led by Opanyin Ayeh Kissi, an elder of Nana Offei Kwasi Agyeman. The Okyenhene and elders readily agreed to help. He therefore dispatched his warriors led by his nephew Safori to join the bandwagon of the Guans and the Kyerepongs. A thousand forces (Akuw apem) thus swooped down the hill unto the hopeless Akwamu regiment at Nsakye as they advanced. Unable to withstand the shock of this highland change, the Akwamu forces broke, scattered and fled across the Volta river to present-day Akwamufie.

This was the famous battle of Nsakye (1730) after which the Akwamu's unspeakable acts of cruelty and depredation on the highland community came to an end. The remnants of Akwamu, the people of present-day Aburi and its envious readily submit themselves to the new power, and thus pave the way for the establishment of Akuapem State as enshrined in the famous Abotakyi Accord in 1733.

== The Abotakyi Accord (1733) ==
The common enemy (the Akwamus) having been driven away, and besides the fear that they might return, came the need to institute an internal security system to face any future eventuality. The Akim warlords thus arranged a meeting among the Guans and the Kyerepongs at Abotakyi. The purpose was to organise the territory into an order known as Twi military order. This consideration influenced the need of allocating offices and creating of new stools. Five divisions were created to rule the state under King Safori, with the later as Okuapehene. The five divisions are: Adonten number 1, belonging to Nana Offei Kwasi Agyeman for his role as warrior during the war. Adonten number 2 went to the remnants of Akwamu for occupying the central position of the ridge. The Gyase position went to Nana Akompi Kwatia of Amanokrom for he being the brother of Okyenhene, and also custodian of Okuapehene palace regalia and paraphernalia. The Nifa position was given to the five Kyerepong towns with its headquarters at Awukugua for his role of negotiating the meeting. The Benkum division was given to the Guans at Larteh. At the first traditional council meeting the Gyakiti warlord was crowned as the senior divisional chief and next commander-in-chief whenever the Okuapehene was away. In 1934, the then Okuapehene Nana Ofori Kuma decided that the Adontenhene Number 1 title be re-designated as Krontihene, a title that did not change his position and status in the hierarchy of Akuapem, even though Nana Yaw Boafo the then Krontihene abdicated in protest over the change. The Krontihene remained as the second-in-command to the Okuapehene. He owns Akropong, as such he is the Akroponghene. The Krontihene in concert and collaboration with the Okoman elders and the Ankobeafo administers the affairs of Akropong.

== The Larteh Accord (8 May 1994) ==
The Abotakyi Accord of 1773 was permanently replaced with the Larteh Accord on 8 May 1994. The new Accord, which was signed by Nana Asiedu Okoo Ababio III, Otutu Ababio IV and Nana Gyan Kwasi II, created the following autonomous Akuapem Paramountcies: Akuapem Guan – with Paramount Chief, Osabarima Asiedu Okoo Ababio III, in Larteh. Akuapem Okere – with Paramount Chief Nana Otutu Ababio IV, in Adukrom. Akuapem Anafo – with Paramount Chief Otobour Nana Gyan Kwasi II, in Aburi. Akuapem Akropong – – with Paramount Chief, Nana Addo Dankwa III, in Akropong The Chief and Elders, who designed the Larteh Accord, wisely included the following provision in it to ensure ongoing consultation with all stakeholders in managing overall interests and affairs of all Akuapem citizens. "Establishment of a Council of Akuapem Paramount Chiefs with a two-year rotating presidency".

== See also ==
- Ghana
- Gold Coast
- Lists of office-holders
