= People's Action Party (Ghana, 2018–2022) =

Political party in Ghana

- Leader: Kwesi Busumbru
- Founder: Kwesi Busumbru
- Founded: 2018
- Dissolved: 2022

Website
- www.papghana.com

The People's Action Party was a political party in Ghana. The founder was Kwesi Busumbru.

== 2020 election ==
The party indicated its intention to contest the 2020 Ghanaian general election. Its leader and founder, Kwesi Busumbru launched their manifesto in early October 2020. Busumbru said that the two major political parties in the country, the ruling New Patriotic Party and the main opposition National Democratic Congress had failed Ghana and that the PAP will offer Ghanaians a viable alternative. Kwesi Busumbru was however disqualified from standing for president in the 2020 presidential election as his form submitted to the Electoral Commission was incomplete. There was also some irregularities with the forms.

== Merger talks ==
In 2022, the parties with an Nkrumaism philosophy had a discussion about pooling resources in order to contest the 2024 Ghanaian general election. The other parties were the Convention People's Party and Progressive People's Party.

== Registration revoked ==
In October 2022, the Electoral Commission of Ghana indicated its intention to revoke the registration of a number of parties including the People's Action Party due to their not meeting the requirements under Section 15 (3) (c) of the Political Parties Act of 2000, Act 574 which requires each party to have nationwide representation in regions and districts. Finally in November 2022, the Electoral Commission revoked the certificates of registration of the 17 political parties including the People's Action Party.
