= Ghana Union Movement =

Political party in Ghana

- Abbreviation: GUM
- Leader: Christian Kwabena Andrews
- Founder: Christian Kwabena Andrews
- Founded: 10 March 2019
- Ideology: Social democracy
- Political position: Centre-left
- Slogan: Arise for Development; Wob3te GUM
- Parliament: 0 / 275

Website
- www.ghanaunionmovement.com

The Ghana Union Movement is a political party in Ghana. It was founded by Christian Kwabena Andrews who is also the founder of the Life Assembly Worship Center in Accra. During the launch of the party, he declared that he is "new Kwame Nkrumah" and also that the "spirit of Nkrumah is back." The party's agenda received some backing from Samia Nkrumah, daughter of Kwame Nkrumah.

== 2020 general election ==
Andrews is one of the presidential candidates for the 2020 Ghanaian general election. He filed his nomination papers on 7 October 2020. On completion of the registration process, his name came third from the top on the ballot paper. Andrew nominated Abu Grant Lukeman as his running mate for the election.

== 2024 general election ==
On September 13, the party filed their quest to the electoral commission to contest in the 2024 general elections. GUM picked number four, and that would be their position on the ballot paper during the election. Although there were speculations that the party would be moved to third position due to the death of Akua Donkor, the EC refuted the claim and promised to maintain the original positions of the parties. Andrew nominated Evelyn Serwaa Bonsu, an entrepreneur and a gender activist as his running mate. The univeilding was after the launch of the party's manifesto for the 2024 elections in Accra.

== Election results ==
=== Presidential elections ===
Election	Candidate	First round		Second round		Result
Election	Candidate	Votes	%	Votes	%	Result
2024	Christian Kwabena Andrews	17,030	0.15%	—		Lost ✗
2020	Christian Kwabena Andrews	105,548	0.80%	—		Lost ✗

=== Parliamentary results ===
Election	Votes	%	Seats	+/–	Position	Result
2020	60,840	0.46%	0 / 200	New	▲3rd	Extra-parliamentary
2024	2,054	0.02%	0 / 200	0	▼8th	Extra-parliamentary

== See also ==
- List of political parties in Ghana
