= Joseph Akuerteh Tettey =

Ghana politician (born 1974)

Hon. Joseph Akuerteh Tettey MP
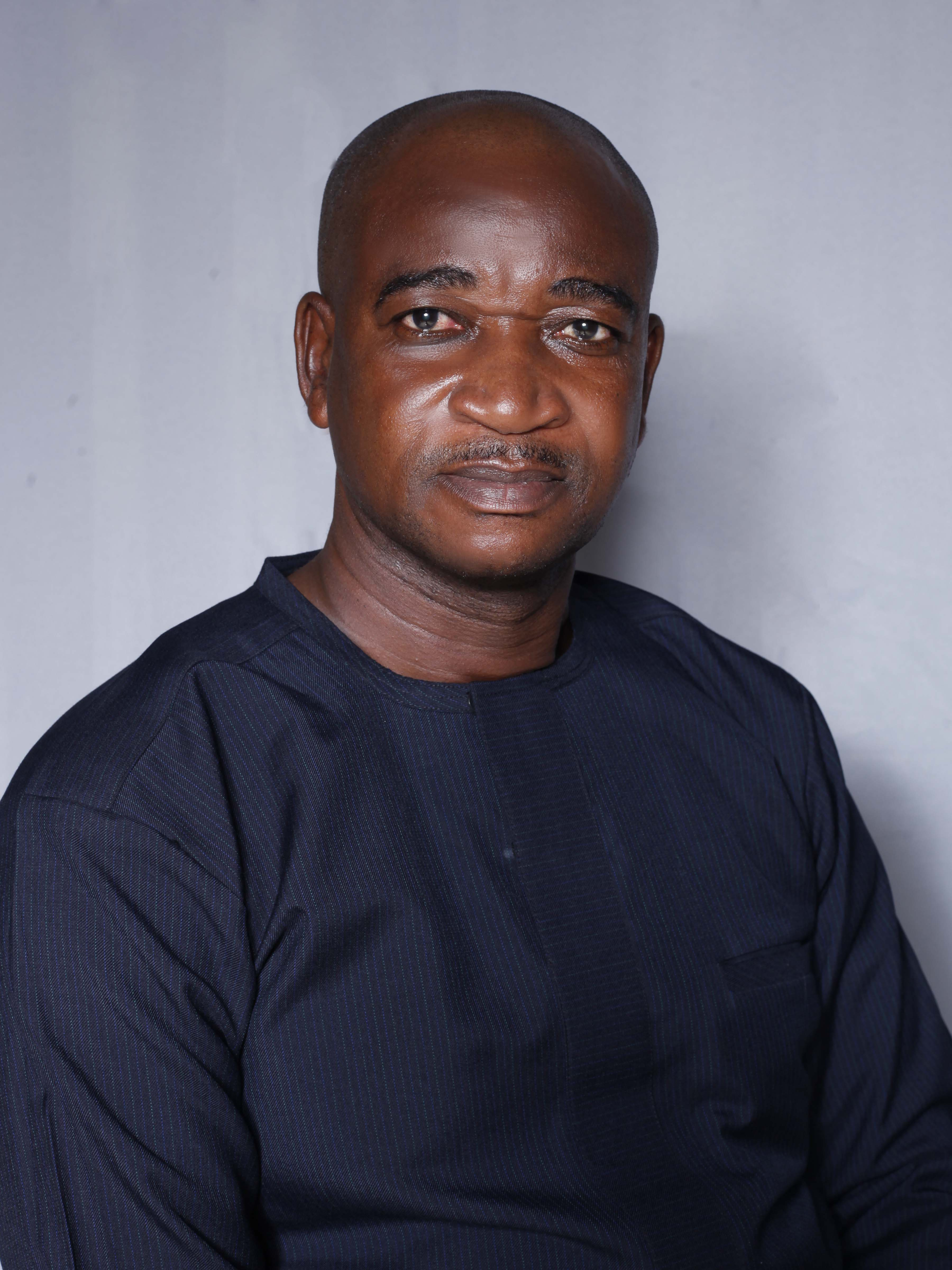

Member of the Ghana Parliament for Kpone Katamanso Constituency
- Preceded by: Joseph Nii Laryea Afotey-Agbo

Personal details
- Born: 5 August 1974 (age 52)
- Party: National Democratic Congress (NDC)
- Education: Ghana Institute of Management and Public Administration (GIMPA), University of Ghana

Joseph Akuerteh Tettey (born 5 August 1974) is a Ghanaian politician. He is a member of the Eighth Parliament of the Fourth Republic of Ghana representing the Kpone Katamanso Constituency in the Kpone Katamanso Municipal District in the Greater Accra Region of Ghana

== Early life and career ==
Tettey was born on 5 August 1974. He Hails from Kpone. He holds a master's degree in business administration (2011) from Ghana Institute of Management and Public Administration (GIMPA) and Bachelor of Arts Degree in Economics (2002) from University of Ghana. He was the Kpone Katamanso District Manager for the National Health Insurance Authority and the managing director of Jobiz Enterprise.

== Politics ==
Tettey is a member of the National Democratic Congress (NDC). He contest and won the NDC Parliamentary Primaries at Kpone Katamanso Constituency to become the party's candidate for the December 2020 election. He won the December 2020 parliamentary election with 51,755 votes representing 55.3% of the total votes cast, beating his main opponent Hopeson Yaovi Adorye of the New patriotic Party who obtained 39,546 votes representing 42.3% of the total valid votes cast.

=== Committees ===
He serves as a member of Lands and Forestry Committee in the Eighth Parliament of the Fourth Republic of Ghana.

== Personal life ==
He is a Christian.
