= Matilda Aku Alomatu =

Ghanaian diplomat (born 1970)

Matilda Aku Alomatu Osei-Agyeman
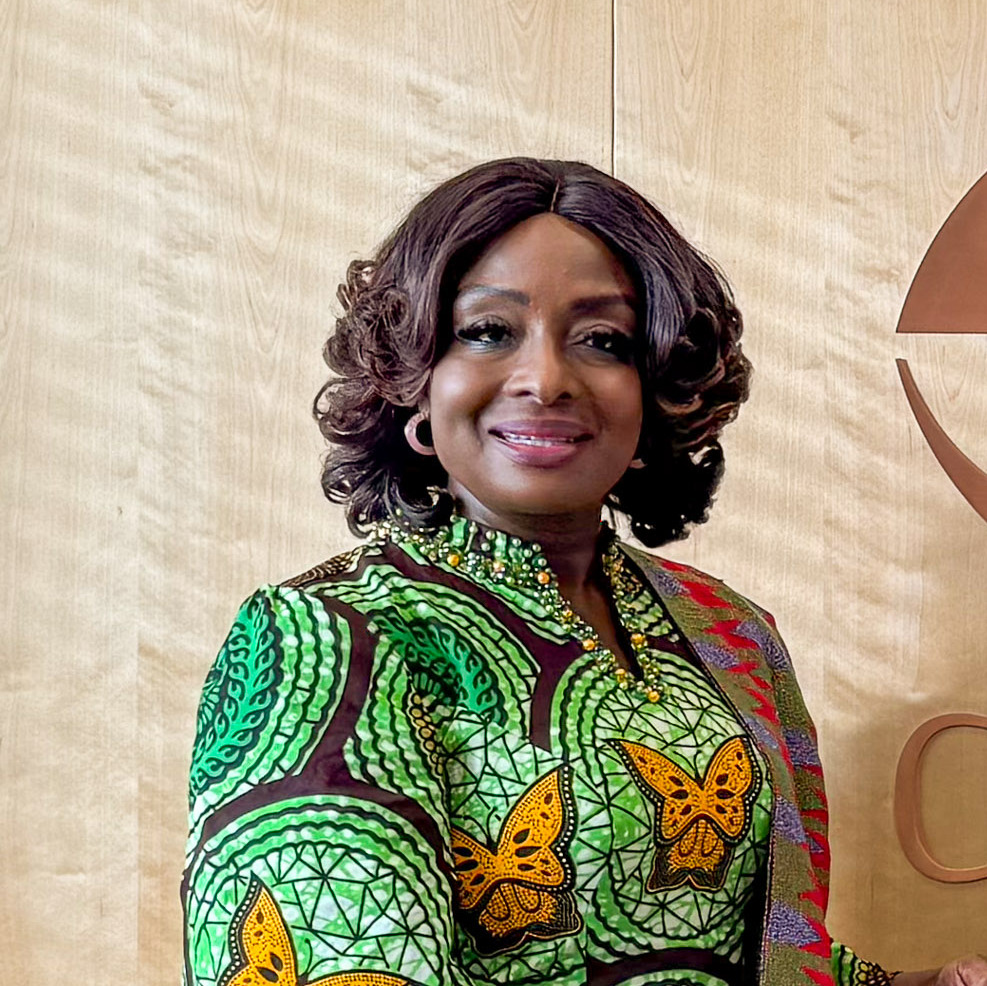
- Alomatu in 2024
- Born: 1970 (age 55–56)
- Education: University of Ghana
- Occupation: diplomat
- Employer: Ministry of Foreign Affairs
- Known for: a former Miss Ghana who became an ambassador
- Predecessor: Brigitte Dzogbenuku (as Miss Ghana)
- Successor: Manuella Medie-Adu (as Miss Ghana)
- Children: two

Matilda Aku Alomatu Osei-Agyeman (born 1970) is a former Miss Ghana who became a diplomat. She was appointed as her country's ambassador to Austria in 2024.

== Early life and education ==
She was born in 1970. Her mother, Cecilia Alomatu, inspired her to become who she is today.

She won Miss Ghana in 1994 when the contest was relaunched. The previous Miss Ghana, Brigitte Dzogbenuku, also went into politics noting that her name was always linked to "Miss Ghana" as it overpowered her later achievements.

She speaks English and French. She has her first degree in political science from the University of Ghana in Legon and a master's degree in international affairs from the same institution.

Alomatu was working at the embassy in Malta in 2016. She was then moved to Ghana's London Embassy from 2017, where she was head of chancery. She was Ghana's acting high commissioner to the UK in 2019. At a meeting of the Ghanaian diaspora in Britain, she appealed to them to assist their home country. She also reiterated the Ghanaian government's intention that they would allow members of the diaspora to vote in Ghanaian elections.

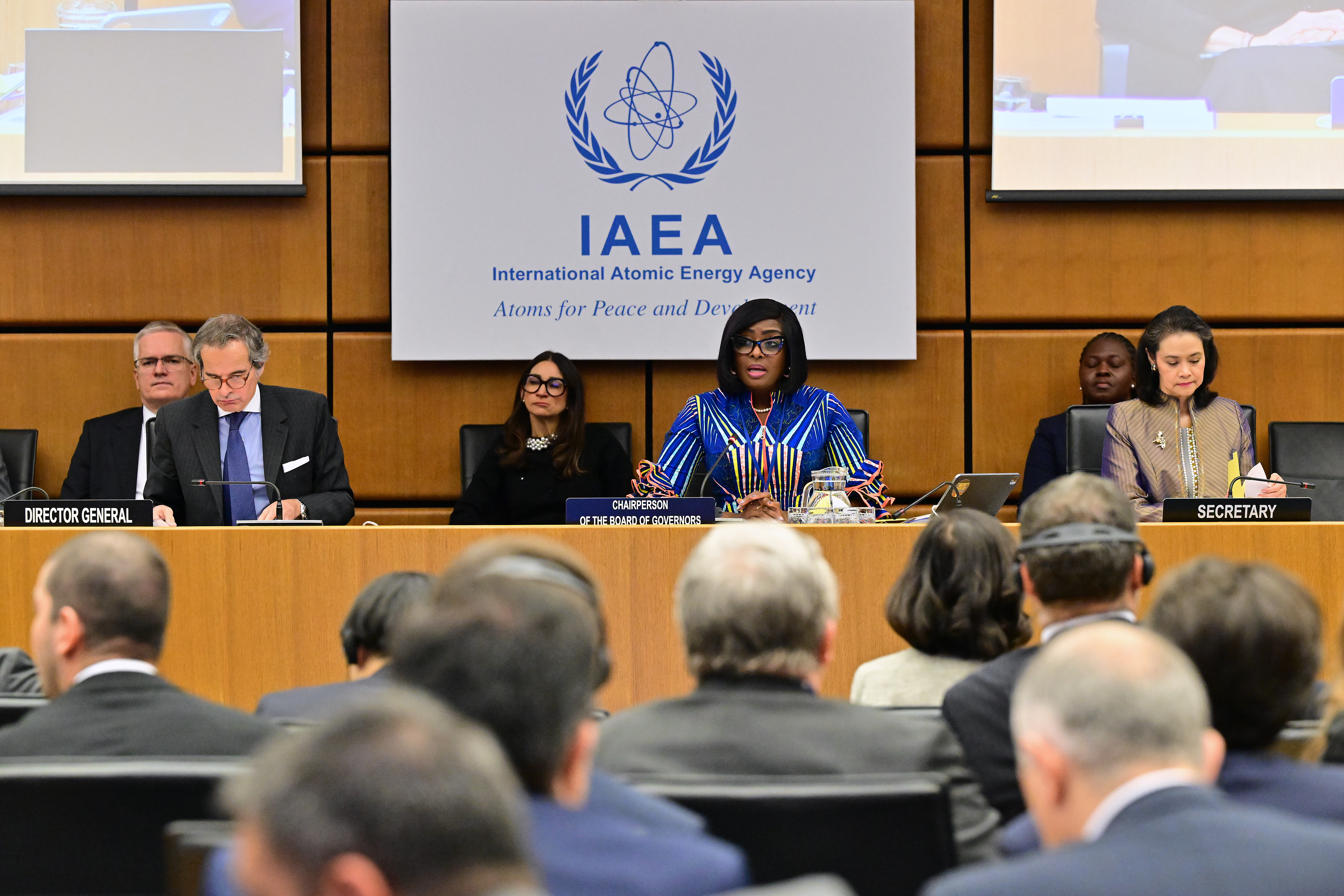
The IAEA Board of Governors Chairperson in 2025

In 2023, she was the deputy head of mission at Ghana's Italian embassy in Rome.

In November 2024, President Akufo-Addo created five new Ghanaian ambassadors, including Regina Appiah Sam to Spain and Vivian Kafui Akua Asempapa to Senegal. She was appointed to be the ambassador to Austria. Alomatu had served earlier in her career as a diplomat in Vienna and Geneva. She presented her credentials on 19 December 2024 to the United Nations' Ghada Waly in Vienna.
