= Kpone-Katamanso =

Ghana parliament constituency

- constituency for the Parliament of Ghana
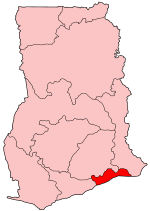
- District: Tema Municipal District
- Region: Greater Accra Region of Ghana

Current constituency
- Party: National Democratic Congress
- MP: Joseph Akuerteh Tettey

Kpone-Katamanso is one of the constituencies represented in the Parliament of Ghana. It elects one Member of Parliament (MP) by the first past the post system of election. Joseph Akuerteh Tettey is the member of parliament for the constituency. Kpone-Katamanso is located in the Tema Municipal District of the Greater Accra Region of Ghana.

== Members of Parliament ==
Election	Member	Party
1992	Joseph Teye Tetteh	National Democratic Congress
1996	Beatrice Love Naa-Afieye Ashong	National Democratic Congress
2004	Joseph Nii Laryea Afotey Agbo	National Democratic Congress
2008	Joseph Nii Laryea Afotey Agbo	National Democratic Congress
2012	Joseph Nii Laryea Afotey Agbo	National Democratic Congress
2016	Joseph Nii Laryea Afotey Agbo	National Democratic Congress
2020	Joseph Akuerteh Tetteh	National Democratic Congress

== Elections ==
MPs elected in the Ghanaian parliamentary election, 2008:Kpone-Katamanso Source: Ghana Home Page
Party	Candidate	Votes	%	±%
National Democratic Congress	Joseph Nii Laryea Afotey Agbo	20,709	63.0	—
New Patriotic Party	Samuel Okoe Amanquah	10,680	32.5	—
Convention People's Party	Daniel Teye Botchway CPP 1504 4.6	1,504	4.6	—
Majority		10,029	30.5	—
Turnout		—	—	—

== See also ==
- List of Ghana Parliament constituencies
