= Ejuratia =

Community in Ashanti Region, Ghana

Ejuratia Ajuratia
- Town
- Location of Ejuratia in Ashanti Region, Ghana Ejuratia (Africa)
- Coordinates: 6.6666°N 1.6163°W
- Country: Ghana
- Region: Ashanti Region
- Metropolitan: Kwabre East District
- Time zone: GMT
  - Summer (DST): GMT

Ejuratia (also known as Ajuratia), is a community in the Kwabre East District of the Ashanti Region of Ghana. As at August 2016, the Odikro of Ejuratia was Nana Antwi Boasiako Kwakye Piagyi II.

== Facilities ==
- Ejuratia Catholic Cemetery
- Ejuratia Senior High School
- Ejuratia Health Centre

== Notable natives ==
- Nana Konadu Agyeman-Rawlings
- Betty Mould Iddrisu
- Juliet Takyiwaa, former member of parliament of Kwabre Constituency
- Akua Donkor
- Felicia Awurafua Gsell, mother of Alex Mould, Ghanaian politician and banker
- Mohammed Baba Nasir, a Muslim leader
