= Akua Donkor =

Ghanaian politician (1952–2024)

Ghana Freedom Party candidate for President of Ghana
- Running mate: Kwabena Agyeman Appiah Kubi
- Opponent(s): Nana Akufo-Addo; John Mahama and 9 others
- Incumbent: Nana Akufo-Addo

Personal details
- Born: February 1952 Ejuratia, Gold Coast (Now Ghana)
- Died: 28 October 2024 (aged 72) Accra, Ghana
- Party: Ghana Freedom Party
- Children: Ama Serwaa Bonsu
- Occupation: Politician
- Profession: Cocoa farmer

Akua Donkor (February 1952 – 28 October 2024) was a Ghanaian farmer and politician. She is the founder and was the leader of Ghana Freedom Party (GFP).

== Early life ==
Akua Donkor was born in February 1952 in Ejuratia in the Afigya Kwabre District in the Ashanti Region of Ghana (then the Gold Coast). She was a Cocoa farmer by profession and was not known to have had any formal education.

== Personal life ==
Akua Donkor birthed a daughter who goes by the name Ama Serwaa Bonsu.

== Politics ==
Akua Donkor was initially an assembly woman for Heman electoral area in the Afigya Kwabre District of the Ashanti Region.

2012 election

She applied to contest as an independent candidate in the 2012 election to become president of Ghana but was disqualified by the Electoral Commission on accounts of not meeting the requirements set for the election. She later decided to give her support to Paa Kwesi Nduom of the Progressive People's Party.

2016 election

In January, months before the elections, Donkor's GFP headquarters located at Kabu in the Eastern Region was gutted by fire. Speaking on the incident, Donkor said the disaster was a test which would not deter her quest to become the president of Ghana.

However on 10 October 2016, the Ghana Electoral Commission announced the disqualification of Akua Donkor, together with 12 other presidential candidates from contesting 7 December election. She admitted that her nomination form was fraught with errors, as pointed out by the Electoral Commission. She called on members and executives of the party not to lose hope as the party would come back in 2020 to contest the presidential race.

2020 election

In 2020, Donkor was among the three female presidential candidates to be cleared to contest the 2020 presidential elections. Out of the 12 candidates that contested, she came fifth.

2024 election

Donkor successfully filed her nomination to contest in the 2024 presidential elections, and placed number 3 on the ballot paper.

Later, Donkor threatened to take John Dramani Mahama, the 2024 presidential candidate for the National Democratic Congress, to court over derogatory comments on her qualification as a presidential candidate during an Inter-Party Advisory Committee meeting which was held on 15 October 2024 in Accra.

The Ghana Freedom Party (GFP) named Philip Appiah Kubi as a flagbearer replacement for Akua, however he was disqualified due to errors and illegitimate information found in his nomination form.

== Campaign promises ==
Donkor promised to implement free education from basic to secondary level. She also promised to eliminate import taxes to enable people engage in more imports. She mentioned the establishment of a free zone at the Tema Port to attract more businesses into the country. This, she said, were achievable through the judicious use of Ghana's natural resources such as gold, cocoa, shea butter and salt. She also advocated that Ghana refine its own resources, especially crude oil.

Donkor claimed Muammar Gaddafi of Libya as her political icon. Inspired by the late Libyan leader, Donkor stated Ghana should be "rubbing shoulders" with the northern African country.

She also wanted the country to elect its first female president, stating women had the capacity to "help change the fortunes of the country for the better".

== Death ==
Donkor died on 28 October 2024 at the Ridge Hospital Accra, where she was receiving medical treatment for an undisclosed condition after experiencing illness during her campaign activities ahead of preparations towards the 2024 Ghanaian general election. She had been diagnosed with abdominal complications two days prior.

Party political offices
New title	Ghana Freedom Party presidential candidate 2020	Most recent
