= Kofi Akpaloo =

Ghanaian politician, accountant and businessman

Liberal Party of Ghana candidate for President of Ghana
- Election date 7 December 2020
- Running mate: Margaret Obrine Sarfo
- Opponent(s): Nana Akufo-Addo; John Mahama and 9 others
- Incumbent: Nana Akufo-Addo

Personal details
- Party: Liberal Party of Ghana
- Other political affiliations: Independent People's Party

Percival Kofi Akpaloo is a Ghanaian politician. He is the leader of the Liberal Party of Ghana. He was also the party's presidential candidate for the 2020 Ghanaian general election.

== Education ==
Akpaloo studied at South Bank University to obtain MBA in Strategic Management and Master of Arts in Accounting. He also has ACCA in accounting from Emile Woolf College, London.

== Politics ==
=== Independent People's Party ===
Akpaloo founded the Independent People's Party (IPP) in 2011. He was the leader of the party when it contested the 2012 Ghanaian general election but won no seats. He was disqualified from contesting the 2016 Ghanaian general election as the presidential candidate of the party by the Electoral Commission of Ghana, a decision he unsuccessfully contested in court.

=== Liberal Party of Ghana ===
Akpaloo dissolved the IPP and formed the Liberal Party of Ghana in its stead in March 2017. He was selected by the party to stand as its presidential candidate in the 2020 Ghanaian general election on 7 December 2020. Margaret Obrian Sarfo was chosen as his running mate

== Personal life ==
Akpaloo grew up in a big family and had a big family of his own with 6 children. In August 2024, Akpaloo garnered media headlines for saying that any man that sought to marry Akpaloo's daughter must first impregnate her. In an interview with Kingdom FM, he explained that having a child before marriage will show a man's seriousness and commitment to be with his daughter.

== See also ==
- Liberal Party of Ghana

Party political offices
New title	Liberal Party of Ghana presidential candidate 2020	Most recent
