= 2020 Ghanaian general election =

- 7 December 2020
- Registered: 17,027,941
- Presidential election
- Turnout: 78.89%
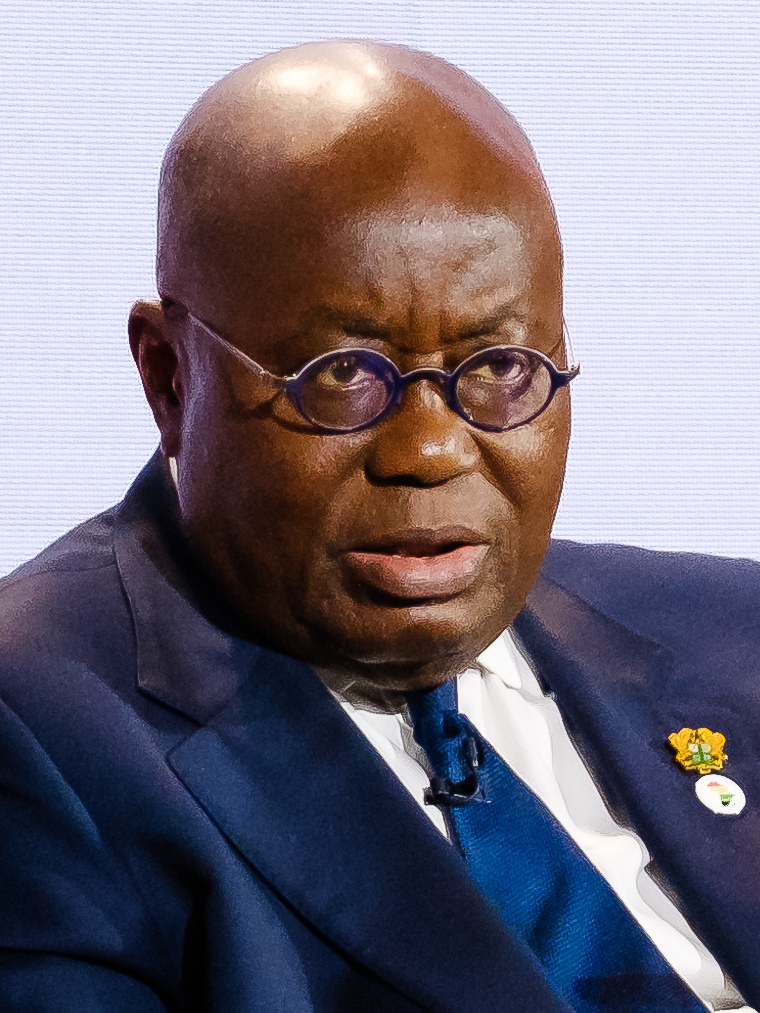

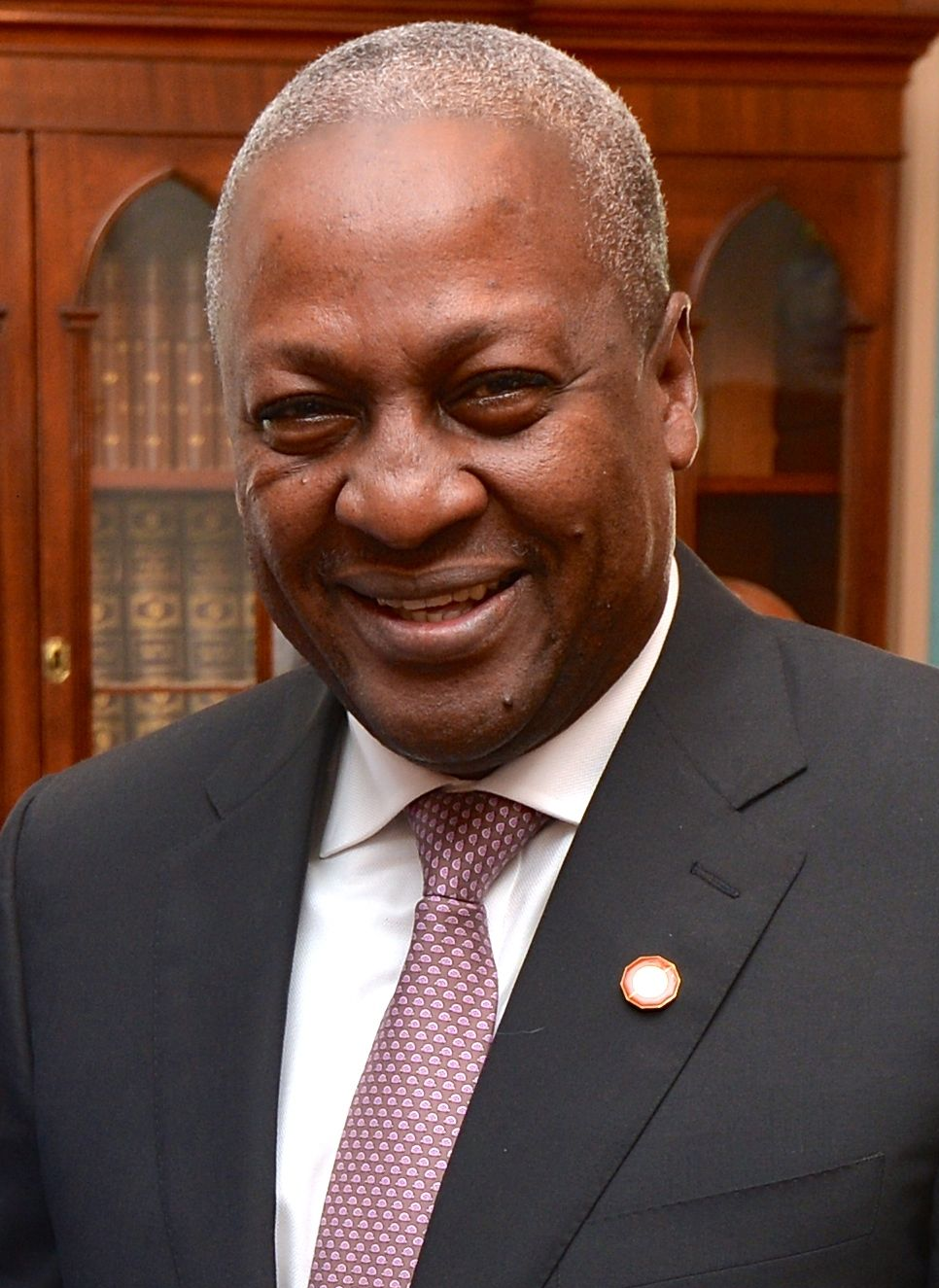
| Nominee | Nana Akufo-Addo | John Mahama |
| Party | NPP | NDC |
| Running mate | Mahamudu Bawumia | Jane Naana Opoku-Agyemang |
| Popular vote | 6,730,587 | 6,213,182 |
| Percentage | 51.30% | 47.36% |
President before election
Nana Akufo-Addo
NPP
Elected President
Nana Akufo-Addo
NPP
- Parliamentary election
- All 275 seats in the Parliament of Ghana; 138 seats needed for a majority
| Party | Leader | Vote % | Seats | +/– |
|---|---|---|---|---|
| NPP | Nana Akufo-Addo | 50.42 | 137 | −32 |
| NDC | John Mahama | 46.20 | 137 | +31 |
| Independents | – | 2.29 | 1 | +1 |
This lists parties that won seats. See the complete results below.
| Speaker before | Speaker after |
|---|---|
| Aaron Mike Oquaye; NPP | Alban Bagbin; NDC |
- Maps

General elections were held in Ghana on 7 December 2020. Incumbent President Nana Akufo-Addo of the New Patriotic Party (NPP) was re-elected in the first round after securing a majority of the votes. Former President John Dramani Mahama announced that he would contest the results. At the Supreme Court, a petition challenging the result was filed on 30 December, and unanimously dismissed on 4 March 2021 for lack of merit.

The NPP lost its majority in the parliament, winning the same number of seats as the opposition NDC, resulting in a hung parliament with a single independent (Andrew Asiamah Amoako) in the position of kingmaker, who later chose to support the NPP.

== Electoral system ==
The President of Ghana is elected using the two-round system, whilst the 275 members of Parliament are elected in single-member constituencies using first-past-the-post voting.

Eligible voters must be Ghanaian citizens who are at least 18 years old, although those declared insane are disenfranchised. Parliamentary candidates must be Ghanaian citizens at least 21 years old, and either be resident in their constituency or have lived there for at least five of the ten years prior to the election.

== Campaign ==
In February 2019, former president John Mahama was confirmed as the candidate of the opposition National Democratic Congress. In December, incumbent president Nana Akufo-Addo announced that he intended to run for re-election as the New Patriotic Party (NPP) candidate. In June 2020, the NPP chose Akufo-Addo as its presidential candidate and Mahamudu Bawumia as its vice-presidential candidate. Mahama and Akufo-Addo previously ran against each other in both 2012 (with Mahama winning) and 2016 (with Akufo-Addo winning).

All contesting political parties especially the NPP and NDC campaigned vigorously across the country despite fears that political activities such as rallies could increase the rate of spread of COVID-19 during the pandemic in Ghana.

Following the death of Jerry Rawlings, first president of the Fourth Republic on 12 November 2020, most candidates decided to suspend their campaigns for a week out of respect to his memory.

=== Filing of nomination papers for presidential candidates ===
At the close of the filing of nomination papers for the presidential election on 9 October 2020, seventeen persons had filed papers to stand for the elections. One of those who filed their papers on 5 October 2020 was the incumbent president, Nana Akufo-Addo. Each candidate was expected to pay a fee of GH¢100,000 to the Electoral Commission. Akwasi Addai Odike of the United Progressive Party claimed that there was a conspiracy by the NPP and the Electoral Commission to prevent him from filing his nomination papers. This was promptly denied by the chairman of the NPP, Peter Mac Manu. However, the NDC questioned why presidential candidates were filing nomination papers when the Electoral Commission has not finalised the new voter's register to be used for this election. To the surprise of many, Jacob Osei Yeboah disclosed on 6 October, when he was expected to file his nomination papers, that he would instead be the running mate of Asiedu Walker.

| Party | Presidential Candidate | Date |
|---|---|---|
| New Patriotic Party | Nana Akufo-Addo | 7 October 2020 |
| National Democratic Congress | John Mahama | 7 October 2020 |
| Independent | Asiedu Walker | 7 October 2020 |
| Ghana Union Movement | Christian Kwabena Andrews | 7 October 2020 |
| All People's Congress | Hassan Ayariga | 8 October 2020 |
| Progressive People's Party | Brigitte Dzogbenuku | 8 October 2020 |
| Ghana Freedom Party | Akua Donkor | 8 October 2020 |
| National Democratic Party | Nana Konadu Agyeman Rawlings | 9 October 2020 |
| Convention People's Party | Ivor Greenstreet | 9 October 2020 |
| Great Consolidated Popular Party | Henry Herbert Lartey | 9 October 2020 |
| Independent | ^{a}Marricke Kofi Gane | 9 October 2020 |
| Independent | ^{a}Kofi Koranteng | 9 October 2020 |
| United Front Party | ^{a}Nana Agyenim Boateng | 9 October 2020 |
| United Progressive Party | ^{a}Akwasi Addai Odike | 9 October 2020 |
| People's Action Party | ^{a}Kwasi Busumbru | |
| Liberal Party of Ghana | Kofi Akpaloo | 9 October 2020 |
| People's National Convention | David Apasera | |

^a – Disqualified by the Electoral Commission of Ghana

=== Final list of presidential candidates ===
Following the vetting of their papers, the Electoral Commission announced the final list of presidential candidates on 19 October 2020. Five people had been disqualified from standing for the election as there were various problems with their nomination documents. These include IT issues with their forms and some had been forwarded to the Criminal Investigation Department of the Ghana Police Service. Those disqualified include Kofi Koranteng and Marricke Kofi Gane who are both Independent. Akwasi Addae Odike of the United Progressive Party, Nana Agyenim Boateng of the United Front Party and Kwasi Busumbru of the People's Action Party were also not eligible. On 20 October 2020, the candidates balloted for the order in which they will appear on the ballot paper. The incumbent president, Nana Akufo-Addo will be the first on the list followed by John Mahama, a former president. The full list as on the ballot paper is below. Following this, one of the disqualified candidates, Nana Agyenim Boateng, leader of the UFP, took to court to seek redress and prevent the elections from going ahead but the Accra High Court found no grounds to grant this relief.

| Party | Abbreviation | Presidential Candidate | Running Mate |
|---|---|---|---|
| New Patriotic Party | NPP | Nana Addo Dankwa Akufo-Addo | Mahamudu Bawumia |
| National Democratic Congress | NDC | John Dramani Mahama | Jane Naana Opoku-Agyemang |
| Ghana Union Movement | GUM | Christian Kwabena Andrews | Abu Grant Lukeman |
| Convention People's Party | CPP | Ivor Kobina Greenstreet | Emmanuel Yaovi Bobobe |
| Ghana Freedom Party | GFP | Akua Donkor | Ernest Adakabre Frimpong Manso |
| Great Consolidated Popular Party | GCPP | Henry Herbert Lartey | Andy Bampoe-Sekyi |
| All People's Congress | APC | Hassan Ayariga | Frank Yaw Kuadey |
| Liberal Party of Ghana | LPG | Percival Kofi Akpaloo | Margaret Obrine Sarfo |
| People's National Convention | PNC | David Asibi Ayindenaba Apasera | Divine Ayivor |
| Progressive People's Party | PPP | Brigitte Akosua Dzogbenuku | Kofi Asamoah-Siaw |
| National Democratic Party | NDP | Nana Konadu Agyeman Rawlings | Peter Tennyson Asamoah |
| Independent | | Alfred Kwame Asiedu Walker | Jacob Osei Yeboah |

=== Violence ===
On 8 December, a day after the elections there were reports of gunshots leading to the arrest of Nii Lante Vanderpuye the incumbent Member of Parliament (MP) for the Odododiodio constituency. The Ghana Police reported 5 deaths and 19 injuries during and after the election.

== Parliamentary election ==
The Electoral Commission announced that following the creation of the Guan District in the Oti Region through the Guan District Local Government (Guan District Assembly) (Establishment) Instrument, 2020, people in this area will only be able to take part in the presidential election. This is because the Guan constituency had not yet been formally created.

== Opinion polls ==
Ben Ephson of the Daily Dispatch newspaper conducted polls in the Greater Accra, Central and Western regions. He predicted that Akufo-Addo of the NPP will win the election with 52.6% of the votes while Mahama will obtain 45.7%. The Political Science Department of the University of Ghana polled 11,949 respondents and predicted that Akufo-Addo (NPP) will win 51.7% of the vote while Mahama wins 40.4%. An iPoll survey of 670 respondents predicted 48.7% of the votes for Mahama and 46.7% for Akufo-Addo implying that the election may go a second round as the winner has to have over 50% of the votes. The Governance Research Bureau predicted that Akufo-Addo will obtain 49.19% of the votes and Mahama 48.27% also implying a second round of elections may be needed.

== Results ==
The total number of registered voters was 17,027,655. The Electoral Commission promised to declare the results of the election within 24 hours of the completion of voting. Some leaders of the NDC expressed their doubts about the commission being able to do so within the 24 hours time frame. In the late afternoon of 8 December the Electoral commission communicated that the declaration of the votes in 24 hours which was supposed to take place at 5:00 pm which is exactly 24 hours of the closure of the election had been extended. The Commission in a statement explained that the extension was to ensure that collation of results at the constituency and regional collation centres across the country are accurate. On 9 December, incumbent Ghana President Nana Akufo-Addo was declared the winner after securing a majority of the votes needed to avoid a runoff.

=== President ===
The declared results exclude the figures for the Techiman South as the results there are being contested. The Electoral Commissioner states that the results of this constituency alone will not change the outcome of the election. On 10 December 2020, the Electoral Commission issued a statement which revised figures for the presidential election results while admitting that there had been some errors. A research group Research and Grant Institute of Ghana raised concerns about this and the Coalition of Domestic Election Observers (CODEO) urged the commission to come out and clarify the errors properly instead of just issuing press releases.

| Candidate | Running mate | Party | Votes | % |
|---|---|---|---|---|
| Nana Akufo-Addo | Mahamudu Bawumia | New Patriotic Party | 6,730,587 | 51.30 |
| John Mahama | Jane Naana Opoku-Agyemang | National Democratic Congress | 6,213,182 | 47.36 |
| Christian Kwabena Andrews | Abu Grant Lukeman | Ghana Union Movement | 105,548 | 0.80 |
| Ivor Greenstreet | Emmanuel Bobobe | Convention People's Party | 12,200 | 0.09 |
| David Apasera | Divine Ayivor | People's National Convention | 10,882 | 0.08 |
| Asiedu Walker | Jacob Osei Yeboah | Independent | 9,704 | 0.07 |
| Kofi Akpaloo | Margaret Obrine Sarfo | Liberal Party of Ghana | 7,683 | 0.06 |
| Hassan Ayariga | Frank Yaw Kuadey | All People's Congress | 7,138 | 0.05 |
| Brigitte Dzogbenuku | Kofi Asamoah-Siaw | Progressive People's Party | 6,849 | 0.05 |
| Nana Konadu Agyeman Rawlings | Peter Tennyson Asamoah | National Democratic Party | 6,549 | 0.05 |
| Akua Donkor | Ernest Adakabre Frimpong Manso | Ghana Freedom Party | 5,574 | 0.04 |
| Henry Herbert Lartey | Andy Bampoe-Sekyi | Great Consolidated Popular Party | 3,564 | 0.03 |
| Total | | | 13,119,460 | 100.00 |
| Valid votes | | | 13,119,460 | 97.67 |
| Invalid/blank votes | | | 313,397 | 2.33 |
| Total votes | | | 13,432,857 | 100.00 |
| Registered voters/turnout | | | 17,027,941 | 78.89 |
Source: Ghana Web

==== By region ====
| Region | Akufo-Addo NPP | Mahama NDC | Andrews GUM | Greenstreet CPP | Donkor GFP | Lartey GCPP | Ayariga APC | Akpaloo LPG | Apasera PNC | Dzogbenuku PPP | Rawlings NDP | Walker IND |
| Region | Votes | Votes | Votes | Votes | Votes | Votes | Votes | Votes | Votes | Votes | Votes | Votes |
|---|---|---|---|---|---|---|---|---|---|---|---|---|
| Ahafo | 145,584 | 116,485 | 1,493 | 194 | 49 | 51 | 150 | 113 | 82 | 52 | 135 | 103 |
| Ashanti | 1,795,824 | 653,149 | 12,564 | 1,356 | 593 | 304 | 482 | 712 | 444 | 435 | 476 | 952 |
| Bono | 292,604 | 203,329 | 4,514 | 338 | 165 | 132 | 255 | 216 | 209 | 214 | 235 | 374 |
| Bono East | 153,341 | 213,694 | 2,923 | 380 | 143 | 153 | 409 | 304 | 231 | 220 | 210 | 400 |
| Central | 613,804 | 538,829 | 15,160 | 1,117 | 478 | 361 | 468 | 586 | 323 | 1,042 | 467 | 804 |
| Eastern | 752,061 | 470,999 | 9,819 | 854 | 379 | 211 | 466 | 510 | 278 | 363 | 358 | 642 |
| Greater Accra | 1,253,179 | 1,326,489 | 16,112 | 1,763 | 767 | 231 | 628 | 522 | 401 | 1,220 | 685 | 511 |
| Northern | 409,963 | 476,550 | 3,184 | 1,510 | 394 | 438 | 900 | 1,281 | 1,209 | 498 | 545 | 1,259 |
| North East | 122,742 | 112,306 | 952 | 292 | 324 | 198 | 376 | 505 | 579 | 205 | 322 | 322 |
| Oti | 103,865 | 181,021 | 2,459 | 265 | 200 | 97 | 195 | 228 | 371 | 240 | 263 | 282 |
| Savannah | 80,605 | 144,244 | 1,409 | 503 | 212 | 185 | 387 | 322 | 344 | 160 | 279 | 435 |
| Upper East | 170,340 | 335,502 | 3,100 | 879 | 832 | 359 | 919 | 868 | 2,890 | 685 | 1,017 | 1,321 |
| Upper West | 121,230 | 238,972 | 2,240 | 640 | 360 | 354 | 487 | 742 | 2,794 | 328 | 406 | 1,094 |
| Volta | 100,481 | 606,508 | 4,679 | 705 | 180 | 158 | 406 | 237 | 220 | 314 | 617 | 442 |
| Western | 439,724 | 398,549 | 20,638 | 1,143 | 379 | 223 | 400 | 367 | 305 | 787 | 417 | 508 |
| Western North | 175,240 | 196,556 | 4,302 | 261 | 119 | 109 | 210 | 170 | 202 | 86 | 117 | 255 |
| Total | 6,730,587 | 6,213,182 | 105,548 | 12,200 | 5,574 | 3,564 | 7,138 | 7,683 | 10,882 | 6,849 | 6,549 | 9,704 |
Source: Graphic Online Electoral Commission of Ghana

=== Parliament ===
Results of the 2020 Ghanaian parliamentary election by constituency

There has been a long delay in declaring the final result in the parliamentary election. On 14 December, a week after voting was completed, the Electoral Commission announced that it was working on finalising the results for Sene West constituency.

| Party | Votes | % | Seats | +/– |
|---|---|---|---|---|
| New Patriotic Party | 6,651,028 | 50.42 | 137 | –32 |
| National Democratic Congress | 6,094,478 | 46.20 | 137 | +31 |
| Ghana Union Movement | 60,840 | 0.46 | 0 | New |
| People's National Convention | 29,211 | 0.22 | 0 | 0 |
| Progressive People's Party | 24,334 | 0.18 | 0 | 0 |
| Convention People's Party | 11,105 | 0.08 | 0 | 0 |
| Liberal Party of Ghana | 7,521 | 0.06 | 0 | New |
| National Democratic Party | 6,421 | 0.05 | 0 | 0 |
| Great Consolidated Popular Party | 1,976 | 0.01 | 0 | 0 |
| United Progressive Party | 1,934 | 0.01 | 0 | 0 |
| All People's Congress | 1,214 | 0.01 | 0 | 0 |
| Independents | 301,996 | 2.29 | 1 | +1 |
| Total | 13,192,058 | 100.00 | 275 | 0 |
| Registered voters/turnout | 17,027,655 | – | | |
Source: ghanaweb.com EC

==== Seats won by region ====
| S/N | Region | NPP | NDC | IND | Total |
|---|---|---|---|---|---|
| 1 | Ahafo | 4 | 2 | – | 6 |
| 2 | Ashanti | 42 | 4 | 1 | 47 |
| 3 | Bono | 6 | 6 | – | 12 |
| 4 | Bono East | 3 | 8 | – | 11 |
| 5 | Central | 10 | 13 | – | 23 |
| 6 | Eastern | 25 | 8 | – | 33 |
| 7 | Greater Accra | 14 | 20 | – | 34 |
| 8 | Northern | 9 | 9 | – | 18 |
| 9 | North East | 4 | 2 | – | 6 |
| 10 | Oti | 0 | 8 | – | 8 |
| 11 | Savannah | 3 | 4 | – | 7 |
| 12 | Upper East | 1 | 14 | – | 15 |
| 13 | Upper West | 3 | 8 | – | 11 |
| 14 | Volta | 1 | 17 | – | 18 |
| 15 | Western | 9 | 8 | – | 17 |
| 16 | Western North | 3 | 6 | – | 9 |
| Total | | 137 | 137 | 1 | 275 |
Source: Electoral Commission of Ghana

=== Petition ===
On 30 December 2020 the NDC filed a petition at the Supreme Court challenging the results. On 4 March 2021 the Supreme Court unanimously dismissed the petition, stated that it lacked merit.

== See also ==
- List of MPs elected in the 2020 Ghanaian general election
- List of general elections in Ghana
