= Akwasi Addai Odike =

Ghanaian businessman and politician

Personal details
- Born: 13 September 1964 (age 62)
- Party: United Progressive Party
- Other political affiliations: United Front Party
- Education: Aduman Secondary school
- Profession: Businessman

Akwasi Addai Odike is a Ghanaian businessman and politician.

== Early life and education ==
Odike completed his secondary school education at Aduman Secondary school where he obtained the GCE Ordinary Level certificate. He later established as a business man running his own company, Odike Ventures in the Ashanti Region.

== Politics ==
=== United Front Party ===
Odike was the candidate of the United Front Party for the Ghanaian presidential election in December 2012. He placed eighth out of eight contestants with 0.08% of the votes cast. A feud developed within the UFP. The main protagonists were Odike and Nana Agyenim Boateng, chairman of the party. This led to dismissals and counter dismissals and some scuffles between both factions. The party contested the 2016 Ghanaian general election but failed to win a single seat. Prior to that election, Addai Odike had been suspended for breaching the party's constitution in appointing his own son as the acting General Secretary.

=== United Progressive Party ===
Odike and Razak Kojo Opoku left the UFP and co-founded the United Progressive Party which was registered with the Electoral Commission of Ghana (EC) in May 2015. In March 2019, he was sacked from the party due to ongoing differences. This sacking split the party into two factions, each claiming leadership of the party. After a period of disputes about who was the legitimate presidential candidate for the UPP, Odike announced that he was withdrawing from the contest. He proceeded to back Nana Akufo-Addo, then leader of the biggest opposition party, the NPP in the 2016 election. He was however critical of Nana Akufo-Addo in the run up to the 2020 election, accusing him of nepotism.

Later, Odike again managed to become the party's nominee to stand for president in the 2020 Ghanaian general election. He complained during the week candidates were submitting their forms to the Electoral Commission that various people including some from the Commission and some New Patriotic Party (NPP) officials were preventing him from registering. This was denied by the chairman of the NPP, Peter Mac Manu. Although he managed to file his nomination papers on schedule, he was disqualified from contesting the 2020 election by the Electoral Commission because his documents were not satisfactory. Odike expressed surprise and indicated that he was going to contest the decision. Some within his own party however suggested that he was disqualified because some party executives including Razak Kojo Opoku, co-founder of the party undermined him.

== External links and sources ==
- Akwasi Addai Odike's profile on Ghana Web

Party political offices
| Preceded by | United Front Party Party Presidential Candidate; 2012 | Most recent |
