= United Front Party (Ghana) =

Political party in Ghana

- Leader: Nana Agyenim Boateng
- General Secretary: Samuel Bekoe Owusu
- National Organiser: Alo Nuhu
- Founders: Nana Agyenim Boateng; Akwasi Addai Odike
- Founded: 2011
- Registered: 2011
- Colors: Red, White and Black
- Slogan: Empowerment for Development

Election symbol
- Golden key

The United Front Party (UFP) is a Ghanaian political party. The party's founders include Nana Agyenim Boateng and Akwasi Addai Odike. Nana Agyenim Boateng has been reported as saying the party was founded as an alternative to Ghana's two main political parties, the New Patriotic Party and National Democratic Congress party.

In the 2012 Ghanaian general election, Akwasi Addai Odike was the presidential candidate for the UFP. He polled 8,877 (0.08%) coming last of 8th contestants. Between 2013 and 2014, a significant rift developed between the founders and members of the party.

Prior to the 2016 Ghanaian general election, the Electoral Commission disqualified a number of presidential candidates including Nana Agyenim Boateng from standing due to irregularities in the forms submitted by the UFP for his registration. The UFP protested and demanded to be given an opportunity to rectify the errors. Odike, who was the presidential candidate in 2012 was now the presidential candidate for the United Progressive Party and was also disqualified. The party later went to court to seek a judicial review. This was unsuccessful and Boateng then announced that the party would back the incumbent, John Mahama's candidacy. This highlighted another rift in the party as Boateng's running mate, David Bunya however announced that the UFP party executives had decided to back the candidacy of Nana Akufo-Addo and not Mahama.

In the lead up to the 2020 Ghanaian general election, Boateng was one of five presidential candidates disqualified by the Electoral Commission. Boateng unsuccessfully sort a High Court order to reverse his ban from contesting the election. Following their disqualification, Boateng announced that the party would back the incumbent Nana Akufo-Addo of the NPP during the 2020 election.

In 2022, the UFP was one of 17 political parties to be informed by the Electoral Commission of Ghana that their licenses may be revoked as they had not satisfied the criteria required for political parties to have offices at both national and regional levels in Ghana. Nana Agyenim Boateng, one of the founders, countered by stating that the Electoral Commission was being biased and discriminatory. The Electoral Commission however whet ahead and on 1 November 2022 cancelled the certificates of registration of 17 parties including the UFP.

For the 2024 Ghanaian general election, Boateng and the executives announced that the party would be supporting the candidacy of Mahamudu Bawumia, the Vice President of Ghana under Nana Akufo-Addo in the Presidential election.

== Election results ==
=== Presidential elections ===
Election	Candidate	Number of votes	Share of votes	Outcome of election
2020	Nana Agyenim Boateng	—	—	disqualified
2016	Nana Agyenim Boateng	—	—	disqualified
2012	Akwasi Addai Odike	8,877	0.08%	8th of 8

=== Parliamentary elections ===
Election	Number of UFP votes	Share of votes	Seats	+/-	Position	Outcome of election
2020	—	—	—	—	—	Not represented in parliament
2016	0	0.0%	0	Steady		Not represented in parliament
2012	3,322	0.03%	0		8th of 15	Not represented in parliament
