= Mohammed Frimpong =

Ghanaian politician

National Democratic Party Leader
- Incumbent
- Assumed office September 2024
- Preceded by: Nana Konadu Agyeman Rawlings

Personal details
- Party: National Democratic Party
- Education: University of Ghana

Mohammed Frimpong is a Ghanaian politician and businessman. He is the current leader of the National Democratic Party.

== Early life and education ==
Frimpong was born in Kumasi, the capital of the Ashanti Region of Ghana. His childhood was at Yamfo in the Ahafo Region. His primary school education was at Namasa, Bono Region. His secondary education was at T.I. Ahmadiyya Senior High School in Kumasi and the Accra Academy. He then went on to the University of Ghana.

== Career ==
Frimpong worked as a businessman. He also served at a stage as the chief executive officer of the Stinhold Limited.

== Politics ==
In 2012, he joined the National Democratic Party which was formed in the same year by Nana Konadu Agyeman Rawlings. She was the wife of a former President of Ghana, Jerry Rawlings. He was appointed the General Secretary of the party. In January 2024, Frimpong announced that Nana Konadu Agyeman Rawlings may not be the leader of the party going into the 2024 Ghanaian general election. Later in the year, he was elected as the party's candidate for president. This was after some contention with another contestant, Nana Osei Mensah Bonsu, who was the originally nominated candidate. He was replaced on the grounds that he had dual nationality which does not allow one to hold political positions in Ghana. Frimpong and his team were targeted by armed robbers during the campaign for the December 2024 election. The police intervened, saving the team. He was not injured in the attack. He came tenth out of twelve contestants in the national election with 4,499 votes (0.4%).

Party political offices
Preceded by Nana Konadu Agyeman Rawlings	National Democratic Party nominee for President of Ghana; 2024	Incumbent
