= Daniel Augustus Lartey Jnr. =

Ghanaian politician (b. 1926, d. 2009)

Daniel Augustus Lartey (1 August 1926 – 28 December 2009) popularly known as Dan Lartey was a Ghanaian politician in the 2000, and 2004 presidential candidate of the Great Consolidated Popular Party (GCPP). He was a former publisher and labour unionist, he became a household name in Ghana following his famous 2004 presidential elections campaign mantra; 'domestication', and also his political philosophy of growing Ghana from Ghana, rather than depending on foreign aid and investments.

== Early life and education ==
He was born on 1 August 1926 at Winneba in the Central Region. He obtained a diploma at the London Chamber of Commerce in 1940 and Sloan's Shorthand Certificate of Proficiency in 1942. He also obtained a diploma in commerce and industry from London School of Economics in 1956.

== Career ==
Lartey worked with the then United Africa Company (UAC) from 1944 to 1958. There, he rose to the status of Senior Management and was posted to the Headquarters at Unilever House, London. In Ghana, he established a number of businesses, they include the Lartey and Lartey Books and Stationery, which later became the nucleus of the Ghana Book Supply, Citadel Printing Press and the Federal Stores of Nigeria.

== Politics ==
His political career started in 1969 when he contested the Gomoa East Constituency seat on the ticket of the National Alliance of Liberals (NAL). He was appointed a special adviser to Ignatius Kutu Acheampong's National Redemption Council government in 1972. In 1978 he represented the Gomoa Ewutu-Effutu in the constituent assembly in the writing of the constitution of the Third Republic. In 1979 Lartey was a founding member of the People's National Party (PNP). In 1992 he was an aspiring presidential candidate of the National Independence Party (NIP), he lost to Kwabena Darko. He broke away from the Convention People's Party (CPP) to form the Great Consolidated Popular Party (GCPP). He run for president twice on the ticket of the GCPP on two occasions; in the 2000 presidential elections and the 2004 presidential elections. He was disqualified by the Electoral Commission from running in the 2008 presidential race because he failed to submit his nomination papers on time; he was able to meet the 17 October 2008 deadline and paid the GH¢5,000 nomination fee, but had errors and inconsistencies in his documents.

== Personal life ==
He was married to Sarah Rosetta Lartey (née Malm). His son Henry Herbert Lartey took over as the leader of the GCPP after his death.

== Death ==
After a short stint in the United States of America where he had received medical treatment, he returned to Ghana on 29 November 2009 but died on 28 December 2009 at the Trust Hospital in Accra after a short illness.

== See also ==
- Great Consolidated Popular Party

Party political offices
Preceded by Daniel Augustus Lartey	Great Consolidated Popular Party Presidential Candidate; 2000, 2004, 2008	Most recent
