= Christian Kwabena Andrews =

Ghanaian priest and politician

Ghana Union Movement candidate for President of Ghana
- Election date 7 December 2020
- Running mate: Abu Grant Lukeman
- Opponents: Nana Akufo-Addo (NPP); John Mahama (NDC) and 9 others
- Incumbent: Nana Akufo-Addo (NPP)

Personal details
- Party: Ghana Union Movement
- Occupation: Entrepreneur, farmer, businessman
- Profession: Prophet and priest
- Known for: Founder and leader of the Life Assembly Worship Centre
- Nickname: Osofo Kyiri Abosom
- Website: www.christianandrews.org

Christian Kwabena Andrews who is popularly called Osofo Kyiri Abosom is a Ghanaian priest and politician.

== Career ==
Aside from being a priest and a politician, Andrews is a farmer, entrepreneur and businessman.

== Politics ==
Andrews launched the Ghana Union Movement (GUM) in March 2019. During the event, he described himself as the new Kwame Nkrumah and declared that the "spirit of Nkrumah is back". He hoped to be able to break the duopoly between the National Democratic Congress and the New Patriotic Party which have dominated Ghana during the Fourth Republic.

== 2020 Pandemic ==
Andrews was keen to have as limited a lockdown period as possible during the COVID-19 pandemic. He gave the Akufo-Addo government a week to relax the social distancing rules or face the wrath of God.

== 2020 election ==
He is the GUM candidate for President of Ghana in the 2020 Ghanaian general election. He is key to continue with ideas of Kwame Nkrumah, first President of Ghana. He was also keen to have an all inclusive government with a Muslim as his running mate. Abu Grant Lukeman was thus chosen to be his running mate. Andrews is also well known for being the Founder and General Overseer of Life Assembly Worship Centre.

== See also ==
- Ghana Union Movement

Party political offices
New title	Ghana Union Movement presidential candidate 2020	Most recent
