= Adum Banso =

Village in southwest Ghana

- Village
- Location within Ghana
- Coordinates: 05°03′00″N 01°54′00″W
- Country: Ghana
- Region: Western Region
- District: Mpohor
- Elevation: 194 ft (59 m)
- Time zone: GMT
  - Summer (DST): GMT

Adum Banso is a village in the southwest of Ghana not far from the coast. Adum Banso is located in the Mpohor District of the Western Region, not far from the port of Sekondi. It is located approximately 39 km from Takoradi.

== History ==
Adum Banso was founded in 1811. Prior to its defeat in the Dutch-Ahanta War, its territorial control stretched from its present location to Takoradi.

The King of Adum-Banso, Nana Kwandoh Brempong I, poured a libation for the construction of Takoradi Harbour in 1927 in recognition of the town's former status as a dominant force in Wasa territory.

Adum-Banso is also home to the largest oil palm plantation in the Western region of Ghana, the Benso Oil Palm Plantation.

== Industry ==
There are unexploited iron ore deposits in the vicinity. There is a vast and unexploited existence of fine soil content suitable for making emulsion paint.

== See also ==
- Iron ore in Africa
