= Independent People's Party (Ghana) =

- Leader: Kofi Akpaloo
- General Secretary: Divine Gabriel Brefo
- Founder: Kofi Akpaloo
- Founded: 2011
- Dissolved: 1 March 2017
- Succeeded by: Liberal Party of Ghana
- Headquarters: Kumasi
- Slogan: Putting people's lives first through technology

The Independent People's Party was a political party in Ghana. Its leader was Kofi Percival Akpaloo, a Managing Principal for Doveson Lovell & Co. Its offices were based at Kumasi, the capital of the Ashanti Region of Ghana. The party's emblem was a computer and its motto was "putting people's lives first through technology". It never had any seats in the Parliament of Ghana. The party sought to gain seats in the 2012 Ghanaian general election of December 2012 but failed to do so. Akpaloo filed to contest in the 2016 Ghanaian general election but was one of thirteen candidates who were disqualified by the Electoral Commission.

On 1 March 2017, Akpaloo announced that the Independent People's Party was being replaced by the Liberal Party of Ghana.
