= Great Consolidated Popular Party =

Political party in Ghana

- Logo of the Great Consolidated Popular Party
- Chairman: Henry Herbert Lartey
- General Secretary: John Thompson
- Founded: 1996
- Headquarters: Citadel House, P.O.Box 3077, Accra
- Motto: Caring for people
- Colours: Red, white and yellow
- Slogan: Caring for People
- Parliament: 0 / 275

Election symbol
- A Bird At Rest In The Centre Of 3 Concentric Circles
- Politics of Ghana; Political parties; Elections; Information taken from Electoral Commission of Ghana

The Great Consolidated Popular Party is a political party in Ghana.

At the last elections, 7 December 2004, the party was part of the Grand Coalition, that won 4 out of 230 seats. Edward Mahama, candidate of the Grand Coalition won 1.9% of the vote in the presidential elections.

The party's founder and first leader, Daniel Augustus Lartey died on 28 December 2009 at the age of 83. His eldest son, Henry Herbert Lartey, succeeded him.

== Election results ==
=== Presidential elections ===
Election	Candidate	First round		Second round		Result
Election	Candidate	Votes	%	Votes	%	Result
2000	Daniel Augustus Lartey	67,504	1.04%	—		Lost ✗
2004	Did not contest					
2008	Disqualified					
2012	Henry Herbert Lartey	38,223	0.35%	—		Lost ✗
2016	Disqualified					
2016	Henry Herbert Lartey	3,564	0.03%	—		Lost ✗
2020	Henry Herbert Lartey	3,564	0.027%	—		Lost ✗
2024	Daniel Augustus Lartey Jr.	17,299	0.15%	—		Lost ✗

=== Parliamentary elections ===
Election	Votes	%	Seats	+/–	Position	Government
1996	1,485	0.01%	0 / 275		8th	Extra-parliamentary
2000	Did not take part					
2004	4,690	0.05%	0 / 275	Steady	8th	Extra-parliamentary
2008	62	0.2%	0 / 275	Steady		Extra-parliamentary
2012	653	0.01%	0 / 275	Steady	▼13th	Extra-parliamentary
2016	1,368	0.01%	0 / 275	Steady	▲8th	Extra-parliamentary
2020	1,976	0.01%	0 / 275	Steady	▼9th	Extra-parliamentary
2024	157	0.00%	0 / 275	0	▼12th	Extra-parliamentary
