= National Democratic Party (Ghana) =

Political party in Ghana

- Leader: Mohammed Frimpong
- Chairperson: Josiah Aryeh
- Founder: Nana Konadu Agyeman Rawlings
- Founded: November 13, 2012
- Split from: National Democratic Congress
- Political position: Centre-left
- Colours: Red, Green, White, and Black
- Slogan: Justice, unity, peace and progress
- Parliament: 0 / 275

Election symbol
- flying dove holding on to the Gye Nyame symbol

Website
- Official website

The National Democratic Party (NDP) is a Ghanaian political party, founded in October 2012 as a split from the ruling National Democratic Congress. Its first leader was former NDC politician Nana Konadu Agyeman Rawlings, who is also the wife of former President of Ghana and NDC founder Jerry Rawlings.

== Founding ==
The NDP was founded in the wake of the death of President John Atta Mills in July 2012. Nana Konadu Agyeman Rawlings had been a 2011 rival of Atta Mills prior to his re-nomination as the NDC candidate for president. The NDP announced its formation as part of the opposition to the NDC's candidate, President John Dramani Mahama, for the 7 December 2012 presidential election. The NDP was announced on 6 July 2012 by its interim General Secretary, Manboah Rockson, and was said to be born of dissatisfaction with the NDC, which had often been personified by the Rawlingses and their supporters. Former populist military head of state Jerry Rawlings had formed the NDC in 1992, and had led the party as President of Ghana from 1993 to 2001, although he had differences with his successor Atta Mills. Its emblems are described as:

...a flying dove holding on to the Gye Nyame symbol as its logo and the colours red, green, white and black similar to that of the NDC with the motto: Justice, unity, peace and progress.

The NDP held its first national congress at Baba Yara Stadium Kumasi on 13 October 2012, endorsing Agyeman Rawlings as its leader. Former President Jerry Rawlings, who spoke at the NDP congress, had as a NDC member attended the launch of Mahama's campaign manifesto on 4 October, leading to what the BBC called "speculation that her candidature could divide the Rawlings home." At the NDP congress he gave a speech saying his former party had lost the "moral high ground" and promising a "proper revolution" within the NDC, saying the party's selection process had been corrupt.

Interim General Secretary Manboah Rockson resigned from the NDP just before the founding congress, saying he was returning to the NDC. Hanford Amoako, former MP for Nkoranza, was named interim General Secretary to replace him. The 13 October congress named Josiah Aryeh as National Chairman of the NDP. Other officers included Hilarius Abiwu and David Sunu.

== Election results ==
=== Presidential elections ===
Election	Candidate	First round		Second round		Result
Election	Candidate	Votes	%	Votes	%	Result
2016	Nana Konadu Agyeman Rawlings	17,207	0.16%	—		Lost ✗
2020	Nana Konadu Agyeman Rawlings	6,549	0.05%	—		Lost ✗
2024	Mohammed Frimpong	4,499	0.04%	—		Lost ✗

=== Parliamentary elections ===
Election	Votes	%	Seats	+/–	Position	Government
2012	33,857	0.31%	0 / 275	New	6th	Extra-parliamentary
2016	19,450	0.18%	0 / 275	0	6th	Extra-parliamentary
2020	6,421	0.05%	0 / 275	0	▼8th	Extra-parliamentary
2024	2,316	0.02%	0 / 275	0	▲7th	Extra-parliamentary
