= Nana Konadu Agyeman Rawlings =

Ghanaian politician (1948–2025)

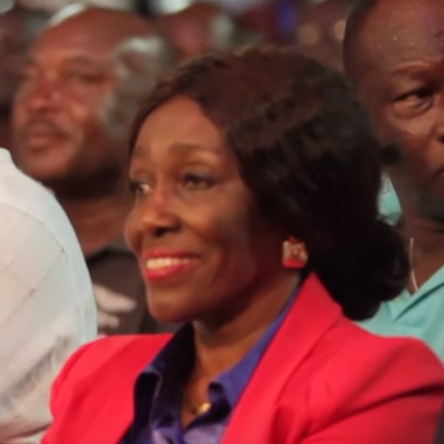
- Agyeman-Rawlings in 2016

First Lady of Ghana
- In office 31 December 1981 – 7 January 2001
- President: Jerry Rawlings
- Preceded by: Fulera Limann
- Succeeded by: Theresa Kufuor
- In office 4 June 1979 – 24 September 1979
- President: Jerry Rawlings
- Preceded by: Emily Akuffo
- Succeeded by: Fulera Limann

National Democratic Party Leader
- In office November 2012 – September 2024
- Preceded by: Founder
- Succeeded by: Mohammed Frimpong

Personal details
- Born: Nana Konadu Agyeman; 17 November 1948 Cape Coast, Gold Coast
- Died: 23 October 2025 (aged 76) Accra, Ghana
- Spouse: Jerry Rawlings (m. 1977; died 2020)
- Children: Zanetor Agyeman-Rawlings, Yaa Asantewaa Agyeman-Rawlings, Amina Agyeman-Rawlings, Kimathi Agyeman-Rawling
- Education: Kwame Nkrumah University of Science and Technology

Nana Konadu Agyeman-Rawlings (née Nana Konadu Agyemang; 17 November 1948 – 23 October 2025) was a Ghanaian politician. She was married to President Jerry Rawlings and was the First Lady of Ghana from 4 June 1979 to 24 September 1979 and from 31 December 1981 to 7 January 2001. In 2016, she became the first woman to run for President of Ghana. In 2018, she published a memoir entitled ''It Takes a Woman''

== Early life and education ==
Nana Konadu Agyeman was born in Cape Coast, Gold Coast (now the Central Region of Ghana), on 17 November 1948, to J. O. T. Agyeman and his wife. She attended the Ghana International School. Later, she moved to Achimota School where she met her future husband, Jerry John Rawlings. She went on to study Art and textiles at the University of Science and Technology. She was a student leader in her hall of residence, Africa Hall. In 1975, she earned an interior design diploma from the London College of Arts.

She further pursued her education over the next couple of decades, acquiring a diploma in advanced personnel management from Ghana's Management Development and Productivity Institute in 1979 and a certificate in development from the Ghana Institute of Management and Public Administration in 1991. She also took courses at Johns Hopkins University, the Institute for Policy Studies in Baltimore, USA, and received a certificate for a fellows program in philanthropy and non-profit organizations.

Agyeman Rawlings' first term as first lady came after her husband served as military Head of State briefly in 1979. Nana Konadu’s husband returned to power in a military coup in 1981 and ruled until 1992 when he was elected as a civilian president. He served two terms of four years, leaving office in 2001. She was the president of the 31st December Women's Movement in 1982. She was elected First Vice Chairperson of the NDC in 2009, and later in 2011, she unsuccessfully challenged President John Atta Mills for the party's presidential candidate position for the 2012 election.

== Life's work ==
In a statement released by the Embassy of Ghana, Agyeman Rawlings stated: "My desire is to see the emancipation of women at every level of development to enable them to contribute and benefit from the socio-economic and political progress of the country... Women's vital role of promoting peace in the family, the country and the world at large must be acknowledged. And to do this, they must be empowered politically to equip them adequately for the challenges of critically identifying and assessing solutions for the betterment of society."

This was the goal of the 31st December Women's Movement (DWM) of which Agyeman Rawlings was president. She described it as a "Broad-based development-oriented Non-Governmental Organization that aspires to achieve these objectives through the effective mobilization of women." In addition, her movement, two million strong, has set up more than 870 pre-schools in Ghana and has worked actively to stir up interest for the accomplishment of child development and family planning.

Agyeman Rawlings said that she would continue to work in the women's movement even if her husband were no longer president. Her husband led a military coup that seized power in 1981, although he was not established as head of state until the following year. The country successfully reverted to civilian rule in 1992 and held free elections. Calling the first lady "an instrumental part of the revolution in Ghana's economy," the Baltimore Afro-American reported that women were Ghana's largest labor force, and they wanted to be a central part of the country's redevelopment. "Before December 31, 1981, they had no power of influence in law or politics, even the laws that pertained to them." It was a grassroots movement, with women selling their land, clothes, and jewelry to get money.

== Women's rights ==
In the early 1980s, a few women approached her wanting to form a women's organization but after a few meetings, little happened. She said that after asking the women what they wanted to do as an organization, "It was clear that we had to start with things that would earn money to develop their communities in the social sector. Most of the women wanted things like water." The movement taught Ghanaian women how to generate income and save money for community projects. It encouraged them to become part of the decision-making process in their villages, and explained policies of health and education. It offered an adult literacy program to teach them to read and write—the majority of women could not do either. Too early marriages among female children were discouraged and programs were offered on nutrition and immunization. In 1991, through the efforts of Nana Konadu, Ghana was the first nation to approve the United Nations Convention on the Right of the Child.

Via the movement, Agyeman Rawlings also played a crucial role in the adoption of an "Intestate Succession Law," which is applicable to the survivors of anyone dying without a will. Traditionally, Ghanaian women had little or no rights of inheritance upon the death of their husbands. The new law provided a standard of inheritance.

Agyeman Rawlings movement also taught village women to become involved in the electoral process. "We literally just pounded it into them until they realized, hey, we don't want any of these people who are living outside our areas to come and stand in our areas to be elected," she said in Africa Report. "A lot of women are now on committees in their villages and districts, some are chairing the committees... I can only say we've made a lot of impact, and I can see from the self-esteem and near arrogance of the women, that now we've actually been able to break through this thick wall." In 1992, 19 women were elected in parliamentary elections.

Pointing to the area of finance as one of their problems, Agyeman Rawlings told Africa Report: "Most of the Western embassies said we were just a political group and they didn't take time to listen. It took a lot of time just getting people to understand... The more women who enter politics, the better the world will be, because we don't think of wars and who is going to manufacture arms and who is going to kill the next person. We want to form linkages, network, and make the world a better place to live in."

== 1995 U.S. Tour ==
During 1995, Ghana's first lady traveled with her husband to cities, including New York, Chicago, Atlanta, Washington, D.C., Houston, Detroit, Lincoln, Pennsylvania, and Los Angeles, trying to encourage investment and trade with Ghana. Her husband was the first Ghanaian president to go on a nationwide tour in the United States.

The first lady of Ghana was in the United States for five weeks, taking part in a fellows program in philanthropy and non-profit organizations at the Institute for Policy Studies at Johns Hopkins University in Baltimore, where she received a certificate after finishing the course of study, which included fundraising techniques, tax policy, and a course on community organization. This was in 1994. In 1995, both she and her husband received honorary doctorate degrees at Lincoln University in Lincoln, Pennsylvania.

== Presidential ambitions ==
In 2016, she became the first woman to run for President of Ghana. She was billed as "The Hillary Clinton" of Africa. She would have become the first female president of Ghana if she had won with her newly formed party in 2016. She won 0.16% of the votes cast. She submitted her nomination forms to lead her party, the National Democratic Party (NDP) in the 2020 general elections in October of the same year.

== Personal life and death ==
Nana Konadu married Rawlings, at the time an Air Force officer, in 1977. They had their first child, Zanetor, in 1978. Two other daughters and a son followed: Yaa Asantewaa, Amina, and Kimathi. Her husband died in November 2020, when the election was less than a month away. She became less active in her campaign but did not withdraw her candidacy. She had a sister called Nana Yaa Agyeman who was the wife of journalist, political commentator and diplomat, Harruna Attah.

Agyeman-Rawlings died at the Greater Accra Regional Hospital in Accra, on 23 October 2025, at the age of 76. Her family announced funeral plans for the late former first lady on Tuesday November 18, 2025. A state funeral was held for her on Friday, November 28, 2025, at the Independence Square, before her burial at the Military Cemetery, Burma Camp in Accra.

Party political offices
New title	National Democratic Party nominee for President of Ghana; 2012, 2016, 2020	Succeeded by Mohammed Frimpong
