= Legal challenge of the 2012 Ghanaian Presidential Election =

Landmark Supreme Court case challenging Ghana's 2012 presidential election results

2012 Ghanaian presidential election petition
- Court: Supreme Court of Ghana
- Full case name: Nana Addo Dankwa Akufo-Addo, Mahamudu Bawumia, and Jake Obetsebi-Lamptey v. John Dramani Mahama and the Electoral Commission
- Decided: 29 August 2013

Case history
- Prior action: 2012 Ghanaian presidential election held on 7–8 December 2012
- Subsequent action: Electoral reforms implemented by the Electoral Commission

Court membership
- Judges sitting: Georgina Theodora Wood (Chief Justice), William Atuguba, Julius Ansah, Sophia Adinyira, Rose C. Owusu, Jones Dotse, Anin Yeboah, Baffoe-Bonnie, Vida Akoto-Bamfo

Case opinions
- Petition dismissed by 5–4 majority; four justices dissented

Keywords
- Electoral dispute, over-voting, biometric verification, pink sheets, presidential election

Following Ghana's December 2012 presidential election, a legal challenge against the declared victory of incumbent President John Dramani Mahama of the National Democratic Congress (NDC) was filed by the New Patriotic Party (NPP) and its presidential candidate Nana Addo Dankwa Akufo-Addo, along with his running mate Mahamudu Bawumia and party chairman, Jake Obetsebi-Lamptey. The petitioners alleged widespread irregularities, including over-voting, voting without biometric verification, and duplicated serial numbers on pink sheets, the official election result forms.

The case was heard by a nine-member panel of the Supreme Court of Ghana over several months, making it one of the longest and most closely followed legal proceedings in the country’s history. Proceedings were broadcast live on national television and radio, drawing extensive public and media interest. On August 29, 2013, the Court delivered its verdict, dismissing the petition by a majority decision and upholding Mahama’s election as valid.

The petition set a precedent for electoral dispute resolution in Ghana and was widely praised for reinforcing judicial independence and democratic stability. It also marked the first time an African presidential election dispute was resolved entirely through the courts, without violence or military intervention. Following the ruling, Nana Akufo-Addo accepted the outcome and urged his supporters to respect the Court's decision, a move lauded locally and internationally as a commitment to peace and constitutional governance.

== Background ==
The presidential election was held on 7–8 December 2012. The Electoral Commission of Ghana declared incumbent Vice President John Dramani Mahama of the National Democratic Congress (NDC) the winner with 50.7% of the vote, securing a narrow first-round victory. His closest challenger, Nana Addo Dankwa Akufo-Addo of the New Patriotic Party (NPP), received 47.7%.

The NPP rejected the declared results, citing alleged irregularities such as over-voting, voting without biometric verification, and discrepancies in polling station result forms. On 28 December 2012, Nana Akufo-Addo, his running mate Mahamudu Bawumia, and party chairman Jake Obetsebi-Lamptey filed a petition at the Supreme Court of Ghana, seeking to annul the results and have the court declare Akufo-Addo the rightful winner or order a runoff.

== Grounds of the Petition ==
The petitioners alleged that electoral irregularities occurred in over 11,000 polling stations and sought the annulment of votes cast in those areas. They argued that these infractions compromised the integrity of the election and materially affected the outcome. The four main grounds cited in the petition were:

- Over-voting: where the number of votes exceeded the number of registered voters.
- Absence of biometric verification: failure to use biometric devices for voter verification.
- Unsigned pink sheets: Presiding officers did not sign the results sheets.
- Duplicate serial numbers: results sheets with identical serial numbers were used in different locations.

== Supreme Court Proceedings ==
The petition was heard by a nine-member panel of the Supreme Court of Ghana, chaired by Chief Justice Georgina Theodora Wood. For the first time in the country's judicial history, the proceedings were broadcast live on national television and radio, allowing the public to follow the trial in real time. The hearings, which lasted several months, drew significant public interest and were widely covered by both local and international media. Notable developments during the proceedings included:

- The appointment of accounting firm KPMG to audit and verify the total number of pink sheet exhibits submitted by the petitioners, following disputes over inconsistencies in the evidence count.
- The cross-examination of key witnesses, including Dr. Mahamudu Bawumia, the petitioners’ main witness, and Johnson Asiedu Nketia, General Secretary of the National Democratic Congress, who testified on behalf of the respondents.
- Legal arguments centered around the credibility, authenticity, and materiality of the evidence, with the Justices questioning whether the cited irregularities were sufficient to overturn the election results.

The court eventually ruled by a 5–4 majority to dismiss the petition and upheld the declared results of the Electoral Commission.

== KPMG Audit ==
During the proceedings, the Supreme Court appointed KPMG, an international accounting and auditing firm, to independently audit the pink sheet exhibits submitted by the petitioners. This decision followed disputes between the parties over the actual number of polling station result forms (pink sheets) filed as evidence. The KPMG audit revealed the following findings:

- A total of 13,926 pink sheets were submitted by the petitioners to the Court registry.
- Within the Registrar’s official set, 8,675 unique pink sheets were found, indicating duplication and discrepancies in filing.
- The audit raised concerns about the total number of polling stations being challenged, as inconsistencies between the petitioners' claim and the verified documentation emerged.

These findings became central to arguments about the credibility and completeness of the evidence, with both sides citing the KPMG report to support their positions.

== Verdict ==
On 29 August 2013, the Supreme Court of Ghana delivered its final judgment in a 5–4 majority ruling, dismissing the petition and upholding the election of John Dramani Mahama as President. The Court concluded that the petitioners had not provided sufficient evidence to substantiate claims of irregularities across the polling stations in question. The Court’s key determinations included:

- The petitioners failed to prove that the alleged irregularities occurred at the scale necessary to affect the outcome of the election.
- Technical or procedural violations, such as missing signatures or biometric issues, while present in some cases, did not amount to electoral fraud or legal grounds for annulling valid votes.

Following the ruling, Nana Akufo-Addo publicly accepted the verdict and urged his supporters to do the same, emphasizing the importance of national unity and respect for judicial authority.

== Dissenting Opinions ==
In the 5–4 majority ruling, four justices of the Supreme Court, Justice Kwasi Anin-Yeboah, Justice Jones Dotse, Justice Owusu, and Justice Ansah, issued dissenting opinions that partially sided with the petitioners. They held that certain categories of irregularities identified in the petition, particularly voting without biometric verification and unsigned pink sheets, were substantial breaches of electoral law.

The dissenting justices argued that:

- These irregularities could have materially affected the outcome of the election if votes from the affected polling stations had been annulled.
- The Electoral Commission had a constitutional obligation to strictly enforce electoral procedures, and any departure from those procedures undermined the credibility of the process.

Despite their position, the majority of the Court found that the evidence presented did not justify nullifying the election results.

== See also ==
- Electoral Commission of Ghana
- Politics of Ghana
- 2012 Ghanaian general election
