= Brigitte Dzogbenuku =

Ghanaian politician and beauty queen

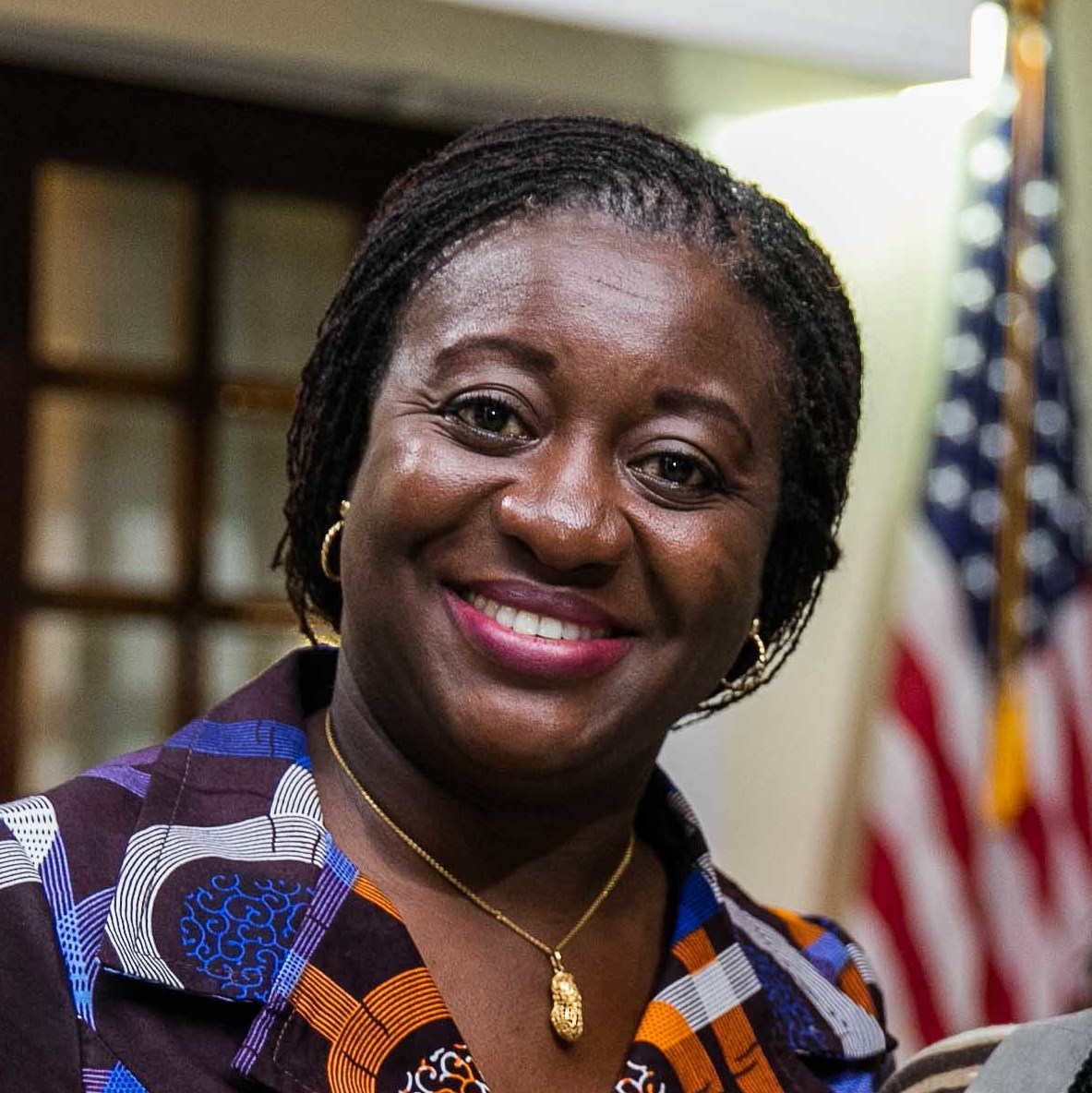

Progressive People's Party candidate for President of Ghana
- Election date 7 December 2020
- Running mate: Kofi Asamoah-Siaw
- Opponent(s): Nana Akufo-Addo; John Mahama and 9 others
- Incumbent: Nana Akufo-Addo

Personal details
- Born: Brigitte Akosua Dzogbenuku
- Party: Progressive People's Party
- Education: University of Ghana
- Occupation: Politician
- Known for: Miss Ghana 1990

Ms. Brigitte Dzogbenuku is a Ghanaian politician and beauty queen who won Miss Ghana 1990. During 2020, she was the presidential candidate for the Progressive People's Party. She presented her first acceptance speech as a flagbearer on 12 September 2020 at the International Press Center, Accra. She is the founder and Executive Director of Mentoring Women Ghana (MWG), an organization borne from her belief that women in leadership makes economic and developmental sense, and also make a difference in communities.

== Education ==
Ms. Brigitte Dzogbenuku had her secondary education at Wesley Girls High School in Cape Coast. She proceeded to the University of Ghana to obtain a Bachelor of Arts degree in Modern Languages.

== Career ==
Dzogbenuku is a columnist at the Graphic Communication Group Limited where she writes for Graphic Mirror under Manners Matter. She was formerly General Manager at the Aviation Social Center for more than 12 years. She also worked with Ashanti Goldfields Corporation as well as SC Johnson Wax Ghana. She established a recreational management consultancy which operated the Barclays clubhouse for a period. She has worked on Mujeres Por Africa/ NYU Wagner Institute program as a facilitator. She has set-up an institution to groom women in leadership called Mentoring Women Ghana (MWG).

She became a politician, like her Miss Ghana successor, Matilda Aku Alomatu who also went into a public life.

== Awards and recognition ==
Dzogbenuku won the Miss Ghana beauty pageant in 1990. She also won the Fortune/Goldman Sachs Women's Leadership Award in 2008.

== See also ==
- Progressive People's Party
- Miss Ghana
- Paa Kwesi Nduom
