= Liberal Party of Ghana =

Ghanaian political party

- Abbreviation: LPG
- Leader: Kofi Akpaloo
- Chairperson: John Ameka
- General Secretary: Jerry Owusu Appauh
- Director of IT and Elections: Prince Amankwah Gaisie
- First Vice Chairperson: Sophia Akpaloo
- Third Vice Chairperson: Eunice Adu
- National Organiser: Samuel Aryeequaye
- National Communications Director: Samuel Owusu Afriyie
- Founder: Kofi Akpaloo
- Founded: 1 March 2017
- Preceded by: Independent People's Party
- Regional affiliation: Africa Liberal Network
- Parliament: 0 / 275

The Liberal Party of Ghana is a political party in Ghana. The party replaced the Independent People's Party (IPP) which was originally founded by Kofi Akpaloo in 2011. Akpaloo, who was nominated to be the presidential candidate for the IPP was disqualified from contesting the 2016 Ghanaian general election due to problems with his nomination forms. The new party pledges to put people's lives first through technology.

== 2020 general election ==
The party endorsed Kofi Akpaloo as their presidential candidate. The running mate selected was Margaret Obrine Sarfo. Jerry Owusu, the Director of Operations of the party announced in May 2020 that the party intends to field candidates in all 275 constituencies throughout the country.

== Election results ==
=== Presidential elections ===
Election	Candidate	First round		Second round		Result
Election	Candidate	Votes	%	Votes	%	Result
2020	Kofi Akpaloo	7,683	0.06%	—		Lost ✗
2024	Kofi Akpaloo	5,327	0.05%	—		Lost ✗

=== Parliamentary elections ===
Election	Votes	%	Seats	+/–	Position	Government
2020	7,521	0.06%	0 / 275	New	7th	Extra-parliamentary
2024	6,903	0.06%	0 / 275	0	▲4th	Extra-parliamentary

== See also ==
- List of political parties in Ghana
