= Marricke Kofi Gane =

Ghanaian author, businessman, and politician

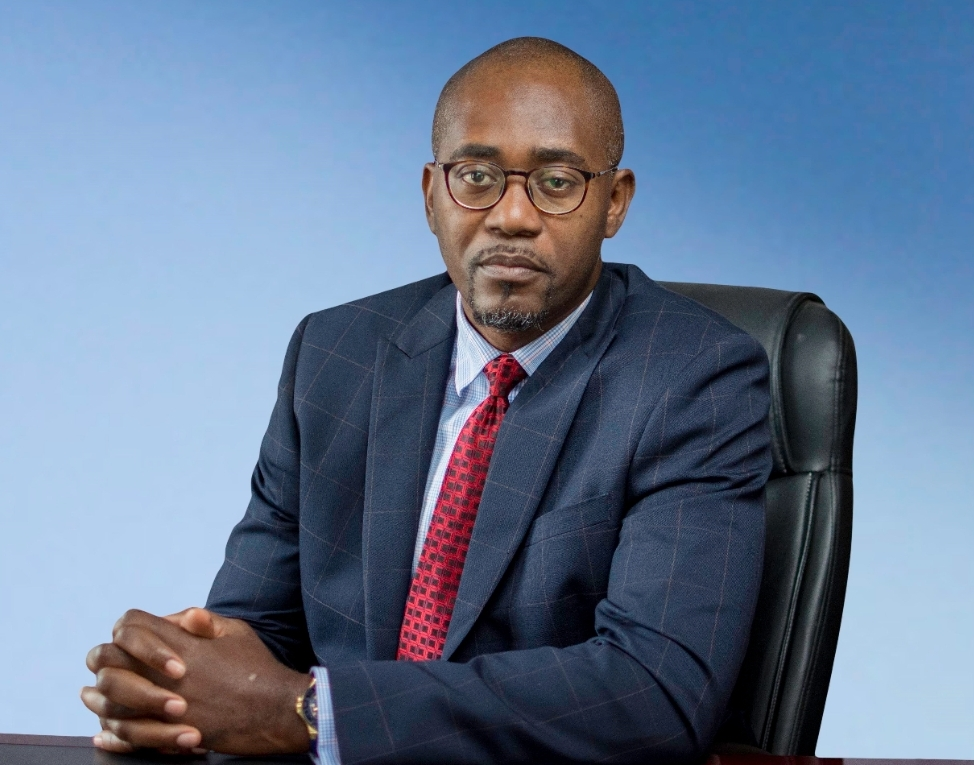
- Marricke Kofi Gane

Personal details
- Born: Keta, Volta Region, Ghana
- Party: Independent
- Children: 4
- Education: University of Greenwich
- Occupation: Accountant
- Profession: Management Consultant, Auditor
- Website: www.gane4ghana.com

Marricke Kofi Gane (born July 19, 1974) also known as Kofi Ghana is a Ghanaian management consultant, Chartered Accountant, Public Speaker, book author and an aspiring independent presidential candidate of Ghana.

== Early life and education ==
Marricke was born in Keta to a trader mother and an engineer father; he is the third of his parents' four children. He spent part of his childhood with his grandparents as his fisherman grandfather's boy and as a second-hand clothes stall assistant to his grandmother on market days at Keta in the Volta Region. He attended the A.M.E. Zion Primary School in Keta for his Junior High School education and the Keta Senior High Technical School afterwards. He studied professional Accounting and graduated as a Chartered Certified Accountant (ACCA). He has a certificate in “Micro-finance for Development” from the University of Greenwich.

== Career ==
Kofi started his career as an Audit Trainee with Messrs Pannell Kerr Forster (PKF). He went on to serve in an Audit senior role, then as an Audit & Consulting Manager at PKF. He served as Co-Audit Senior role at the Ghana Commercial Bank. He also served as a Feasibility Studies Consultant for the potential revival of the then Pwalugu Tomato factory, and with the Benso Oil Palm Plantation.

Marricke also lectured several ACCA, CIMA and ICSA courses in several institutions in Ghana. He later worked for development, policy, think-tank and diplomatic organisations such as Christian Aid, the Commonwealth Secretariat, International Alert, and lastly, Crown Agents. He is currently a Director of Studies in selected Public Financial Management Subjects.

Marricke is also an opinion columnist at ModernGhana.com.

== Politics ==
In 2019 Marricke announced his intention to run for office as president of Ghana as an independent candidate. In August 2020, he left the Coalition of Independent Political Aspirants (CIPA) to run his own campaign based on what he describes as a flawed process leading to Kofi Koranteng being chosen as the lead candidate going into the December polls. He launched his manifesto and campaign at the Alisa Hotel in Accra. In October 2020, his party's nomination was disqualified by the Electoral Commission (EC) for technical reasons. He challenged his disqualification by the EC but was subsequently dismissed by an Accra High Court.
