= Ghana Freedom Party =

Political party in Ghana

- Leader: Philip Appiah Kubi
- General Secretary: George Afful
- Founder: Akua Donkor
- Founded: 2012
- Headquarters: Kabu, Akwampim North Municipality, Eastern Region
- Colours: Green and yellow
- Slogan: Love and Unity
- Parliament: 0 / 276

Election symbol
- Cocoa and palm tree

The Ghana Freedom Party is a party founded by Akua Donkor, a farmer.

== Disqualifications ==
Akua Donkor was disqualified by the Electoral Commission of Ghana from contesting the Ghanaian presidential election, 2012 as an independent candidate. This was due to irregularities on the registration documents for the election. Akua Donkor who was this time the party's candidate for the Ghanaian presidential election, 2016 was again disqualified in October 2016. She appeared to back the incumbent president at the time, John Mahama when her candidacy was rejected by the Electoral Commission. The party headquarters was sited at Kabu, which is a village in the Akwapim North Municipality of the Eastern Region of Ghana. This was gutted by fire in January 2016.

== 2020 election ==
Akua Donkor submitted her nomination forms to contest the 2020 presidential election in person to the Electoral Commissioner, Jean Mensa. Her running mate was Ernest Adakabre Frimpong Manso. In the election, she won 5,574 votes (0.04% of the total votes cast) to place 11th out of 12 aspirants. Akua Donkor was quick to concede to Nana Akufo-Addo prior to the formal declaration of the results by the Electoral Commission on 10 December 2020. She was also pleased to have made it onto the ballot this time round.

== 2024 election ==
Akua Donkor was again elected to contest the 2024 presidential election on the ticket of the Ghana Freedom party and was part of the 13 presidential candidates cleared by the electoral commission of Ghana. But she died on 28 October 2024 at Greater Accra Regional Hospital following an illness and the party is yet to elect her replacement. The Ghana Freedom Party has withdrawn from the 2024 elections due to the death of their presidential candidate, Akua Donkor.

On 5 November 2024, Philip Appiah Kubi popularly known as Roman Fada, filed his nomination as the new presidential candidate for the party following the Electoral Commissions' announcement to nominate a new candidate within 10 days after the demise of the party's founder, Akua Donkor.

The Electoral Commission of Ghana on November 12, 2024, disqualified the filing of the nomination of the new candidate on the grounds of illegalities following the demise of party founder, Akua Donkor.

On 12 November 2024, the newly nominated flagbearer was disqualified due to errors and illegalities in his nomination forms which could not be overlooked as stated by the Electoral Commission.

== Election results ==
=== Presidential elections ===
| Election | Candidate | First round | | Second round | | Result |
| Election | Candidate | Votes | % | Votes | % | Result |
|---|---|---|---|---|---|---|
| 2020 | Akua Donkor | 5,574 | 0.04% | — | | Lost ✗ |

=== Parliamentary elections ===
| Election | Votes | % | Seats | +/– | Position | Result |
|---|---|---|---|---|---|---|
| 2012 | 77 | 0.00% | 0 / 200 | New | 15th | Extra-parliamentary |
| 2016 | Did not contest | | 0 / 200 | 0 | —N/a | Extra-parliamentary |
| 2020 | Did not contest | | 0 / 200 | 0 | —N/a | Extra-parliamentary |
| 2024 | 643 | 0.01% | 0 / 200 | 0 | ▲11th | Extra-parliamentary |

== See also ==
- List of political parties in Ghana
