= Akwamufie =

Town in Eastern Region, Ghana

Coordinates: 6°17′N 0°05′E

Akwamufie is the ceremonial capital of the Akwamu people. It is located along the Akuapim-Togo range, the Volta River and in the Eastern Region, Ghana. It is the town where Regent Chief, Odeneho Kwafo-Akoto III along with Regent Queen Nana Afrakoma II reside and administer their operations. The majority of the divisional chiefs and sub chiefs also reside in Akwamufie. Akwamu State or Kingdom consists of thirty six towns of which Akwamufie is the capital. While the Paramount Chief is the Head of Akwamu State (Akwamuman), the occupant of the Osomanyawa Stool; the Senior Divisional Chief is the Akwamufiehene and he is second in command to the Akwamuhene, Paramount Chief, Odeneho Kwafo Akoto III.

The town was founded after the western portion of the Akwamu Kingdom was overrun by the Akyem in 1730.

== See also ==
- Akan people
- List of rulers of the Akan state of Akuapem Guan
