= Henry Herbert Lartey =

Ghanaian politician (born 1954)

Personal details
- Born: 13 February 1954 (age 72) Accra, Ghana
- Party: Great Consolidated Popular Party
- Relations: Daniel Augustus Lartey

Henry Herbert Lartey is a Ghanaian accountant, entrepreneur and politician. He was the candidate of the Great Consolidated Popular Party for the Ghanaian presidential election in December 2012. He replaced his father Daniel Augustus Lartey as the leader of the party and was chosen to contest the 7 December 2012 election. He netted 38,223 votes out of the 10,995,262 valid votes cast.

== External links and sources ==
- GCPP Official website

Party political offices
| Preceded by Daniel Augustus Lartey | Great Consolidated Popular Party Presidential Candidate; 2012, 2016, 2020 | Most recent |
