= United Progressive Party (Ghana) =

Ghanaian political party

- Abbreviation: UPP
- Leader: Akwasi Addai Odike
- Founders: Akwasi Addai Odike. Dean Djokoto
- Registered: 27 May 2015
- Ideology: Social democracy
- Slogan: UFP: Ɛyɛ Merɛ, UPP: Yɛ Merɛnie
- Parliament: 0 / 275

The United Progressive Party is a political party in Ghana. Its founders were Akwasi Addai Odike and Dean Djokoto. It received its final certificate of registration from the Electoral Commission of Ghana in May 2015.

The party contested the 2016 Ghanaian general election but failed to win a single seat. Prior to that election, Addai Odike had been suspended for breaching the party's constitution in appointing his own son as the acting General Secretary.

In March 2019, he was sacked from the party due to ongoing differences. Odike managed to become the party's nominee to stand for president in the 2020 Ghanaian general election. He complained during the week candidates were submitting their forms to the Electoral Commission of Ghana (EC) that various people including the EC and some New Patriotic Party officials were preventing him from registering. Although he managed to file his nomination papers on schedule, he was disqualified from contesting the 2020 election by the Electoral Commission because his documents were not satisfactory. Odike expressed surprise and indicated that he was going to contest the decision.

== Electoral performance ==
=== Parliamentary elections ===
Election	Votes	%	Seats	+/–	Position	Government
2016	430	0.00%	0 / 275		11th	Extra-parliamentary
2020	1,934	0.01%	0 / 275	Steady	▲10th	Extra-parliamentary

== See also ==
- List of political parties in Ghana
