= Regina Appiah Sam =

Ghanaian diplomat

Regina Appiah-Sam is a Ghanaian diplomat and career foreign service officer who served as Ghana's Ambassador to the Spain. She is a member of the Ministry of Foreign Affairs and Regional Integration and has held various diplomatic roles across multiple regions.

== Early life and education ==
Publicly available information on Regina Appiah-Sam's early life and educational background is limited. However, her career reflects formal training consistent with entry into Ghana's diplomatic service.

== Career ==
=== Foreign Service ===
Appiah-Sam joined the Ministry of Foreign Affairs and Regional Integration in 2002 as a Foreign Service Officer. Over the years, she has served in various capacities both at headquarters and in Ghana's diplomatic missions abroad. Her postings have spanned regions including Europe, Africa, South America, and Asia. In these roles, she contributed to Ghana's foreign policy implementation, international negotiations, and diplomatic representation.

She has participated in several international engagements, including meetings of the African Union, Africa–EU ministerial conferences and global forums on climate change, governance, and development

She has also undertaken professional training in areas such as diplomacy, cybersecurity, conflict resolution, and international trade negotiations, including matters relating to the African Continental Free Trade Area.

=== Ambassador to Spain ===
In 2024, Appiah-Sam was appointed Ghana's Ambassador to Spain. She assumed office in 2025 after presenting her credentials to Felipe VI. During her tenure, she was also accredited to Andorra and served as Ghana's Permanent Representative to UN Tourism (formerly the United Nations World Tourism Organization), headquartered in Madrid.

Her work as ambassador focused on promoting bilateral trade and investment between Ghana and Spain, strengthening cooperation in tourism, education, and culture, engaging the Ghanaian diaspora in Spain and supporting partnerships in agriculture, technology, and sustainable development

== Personal life ==
Appiah-Sam is married with children. Her interests include reading, photography, and cooking.

== See also ==
- Ministry of Foreign Affairs and Regional Integration
- Ghana–Spain relations
