= Benso Oil Palm Plantation =

Oil palm planatation in Ghana

- Type: Private
- Traded as: GSE: BOPP
- Industry: Oil palm
- Founded: Founded in 1978 and was listed in the Ghana Stock exchange GSE in 2004
- Headquarters: Adum Banso Estate, Adum Banso, Western Region, Ghana
- Key people: Santosh Pillai (managing director); Samuel Awonnea Avaala (executive director & group manager)
- Products: Oil palm, crude palm oil CPO
- Owner: Wilmar International purchase from Unilever

Benso Oil Palm Plantation is a Ghanaian oil palm plantation and company, based at the Adum Banso Estate in the Western Region of Ghana. It was founded in 1978, and is involved with the production and processing of crude palm oil CPO for refining and a host of industrial uses, owning over 5,000 hectares of oil palm plantations. The company is listed on the Ghana Stock Exchange under the symbol BOPP, and is a subsidiary of Wilmar International.
