= Gyakiti =

Coordinates: 6°24′N 0°04′E

- Village
- Nickname: Ajasco
- Interactive map of Gyakiti
- Country: Ghana
- Region: Eastern
- District: Asuogyaman
- Time zone: UTC+0 (GMT)

Gyakiti is a town in the east of Ghana, in the Asuogyaman District of the Eastern Region. The Presbyterian Church established one of its first missionary outposts there. The school and mission house are believed to be close to a hundred years old.
