= Fulera Limann =

First Lady of Ghana

Fulera Limann (born 8 November 1945) was a First Lady in the third republic of Ghana as the wife of the late Hilla Limann.

The late Hilla Limann was overthrown by former President Jerry John Rawlings in 1981. Fulera said the overthrowing of her husband did not come as a shock to her as it was something they both had expected.
