= Progressive People's Party (Ghana) =

Political party in Ghana

- President: Paa Kwesi Nduom
- Founder: Paa Kwesi Nduom
- Founded: January 2012
- Headquarters: Cape Coast • Kumasi • Sunyani • Sekondi-Takoradi
- Ideology: Progressivism; Liberalism; Social liberalism
- Continental affiliation: Africa Liberal Network
- International affiliation: Liberal International (Observer)
- Colors: Lust and white
- Slogan: Awake
- Parliament: 0 / 275

Election symbol
- Lust Sun on a white background

Website
- The ProgressivePeople'sParty.org

Progressive People's Party (PPP) (Akan: Kɔ anim ɔmanfo Apontow) is a political party in Ghana. It was formed in 2012 by Paa Kwesi Nduom, a businessman, politician and a former presidential candidate for the Convention People's Party during the 2008 general election. The PPP pulled 64,267 popular votes in the 2012 general elections with Papa Kwesi Nduom as a flagbearer and Brigitte Dzogbenuku as the running mate, making it the third-largest party and the second-largest opposition party in Ghana.

The party's National Head Office Building is located in Asylum Down, Accra. The motto of the party is "Prosperity in Peace" with "Awake" as slogan.

== History ==
The party's formation was followed by a declaration on 28 December 2011 by Papa Kwesi Nduom for progressive and independent-minded people to come together and form an alternative political movement to compete for political power for a major transformation of the Ghanaian society.

The interim leadership of the progressive movement began a nationwide campaign to recruit members to form Interim Regional and Constituency Executives. The team visited the then ten regions of Ghana.

In January 2012, the party submitted an application to the Electoral Commission for registration by the Political Parties Act.

The party received its provisional certificate on Friday, 3 February 2012. The party went to the first National Convention on 25th February, 2012, which was held at the Accra Sports Stadium. The Final Certificate was received on Thursday 5 March 2012.

== Claims ==
The Progressive People's Party seeks power to implement an agenda for change built on stewardship, education, healthcare, and jobs. PPP plans to implement the agenda using the spirit of inclusiveness and full participation of women and youth. Most importantly, PPP has stated that it will maintain an incorruptible leadership.

== Structure ==
The Party elected officers in two-thirds of the districts in Ghana as well as Regional Executives. Elected National Officers of the party include: Nii Allotey Brew Hammond – chairperson; William Doworkpor – First Vice Chairperson; Ban Saliah – Second Vice Chairperson; Belinda Bulley – Third Vice Chairperson, Murtala Ahmed Mohammad – National Secretary; Felix William Ogwah – National Treasurer; Nana Ofori Owusu – Director of Operations; Vivian Tetteh – Women Coordinator; Divine Nkrumah – Youth Coordinator; Kofi Asamoah Siaw – Policy Adviser; Deroy Kwesi Andrew – Director of Research; Richard Nii Amarh – Executive Director and Paa Kow Ackon – Director of Communication.

== Election results ==
=== Presidential elections ===
In 2024, Kofi Asamoah Siaw was elected to contest as the presidential candidate for the party. His forms were submitted after the deadline. In view of this, he was not on the final list of candidates cleared by the Electoral Commission to stand for the election.

Election	Candidate	First round		Second round		Result
Election	Candidate	Votes	%	Votes	%	Result
2012	Paa Kwesi Nduom	64,362	0.59%	—		Lost ✗
2016	Paa Kwesi Nduom	106,092	0.99%	—		Lost ✗
2020	Brigitte Dzogbenuku	6,849	0.05%	—		Lost ✗

=== Parliamentary elections ===
Election	Votes	%	Seats	+/–	Position	Result
2012	33,857	0.31%	0 / 200	New	3rd	Extra-parliamentary
2016	186,741	1.73%	0 / 200	0	3rd	Extra-parliamentary
2020	24,334	0.18%	0 / 200	0	▼5th	Extra-parliamentary
2024	5,890	0.05%	0 / 200	0	5th	Extra-parliamentary
