= Nana Agyenim Boateng =

Ghanaian politician

Dr. Nana Agyenim Boateng

Personal details
- Party: United Front Party
- Occupation: Politician
- Known for: Flag bearer of United Front Party (2016)

Agyenim Boateng is a Ghanaian politician known as the flag bearer of the United Front Party. He is one of the candidates who was disqualified from contesting in the 2016 general elections by the Electoral Commission of Ghana.
