= Anum-Boso =

Ghanaian town

Anum-Boso is a town in the Eastern Region of Ghana.
