= Jacob Osei Yeboah =

Ghanaian politician

- Education: Opoku Ware School (Santasi-Kumasi); Kwame Nkrumah University of Science and Technology
- Occupations: Politician; W/Africa Manager for mining companies

Jacob Osei Yeboah is a politician who ran as an independent candidate for Ghana's presidential elections in 2012 and 2016. Yeboah obtained less than one percent of the valid votes cast in the 2012 presidential election and was one of four presidential candidates to not be disqualified by the Electoral Commission ahead of the 2016 General Election.

Yeboah is a former student of Opoku Ware School (Santasi-Kumasi) and received his first degree in Electrical/Electronic Engineering from Kwame Nkrumah University of Science and Technology in 1994.

Yeboah began his graduate national service at the Ashanti Goldfields Company (AGC) in Obuasi and was later employed in October 1995. Jacob became a board member representing the senior staff in October 1996. Yeboah progressed through the ranks at the Pompora Treatment Plant (PTP), going from instrumentation engineer to instrumentation superintendent within three years.

Yeboah was later appointed as Projects Coordinator in 2000. He served on the AGC Obuasi board for two terms over a period of six years. Yeboah joined Sherwood International, a member of the Supergroup Company in South Africa, as the W/Africa Manager for mining companies developing supply chain management.
