= 2012 Ghanaian general election =

- 7–8 December 2012
- Presidential election
- Turnout: 79.43%
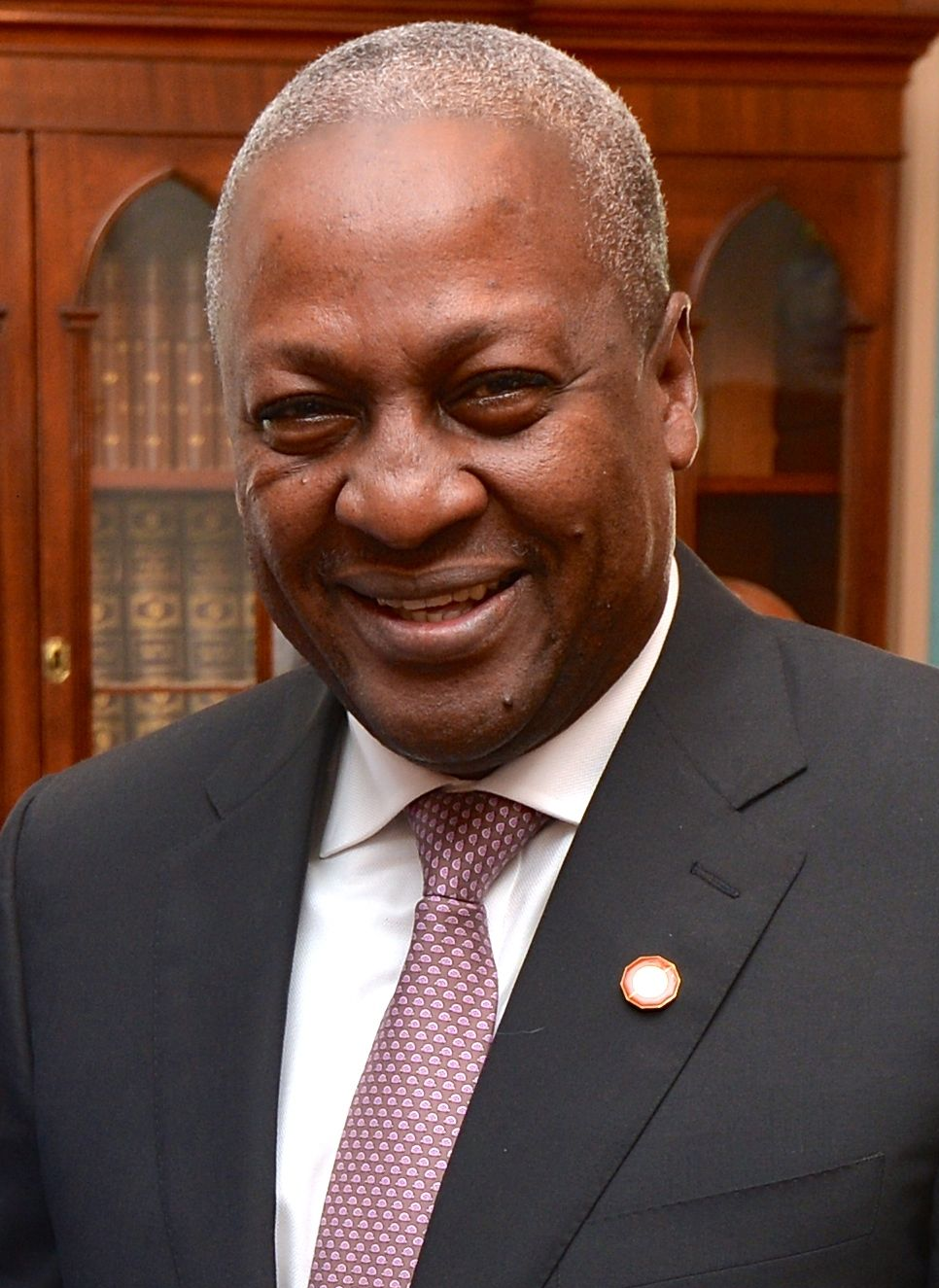

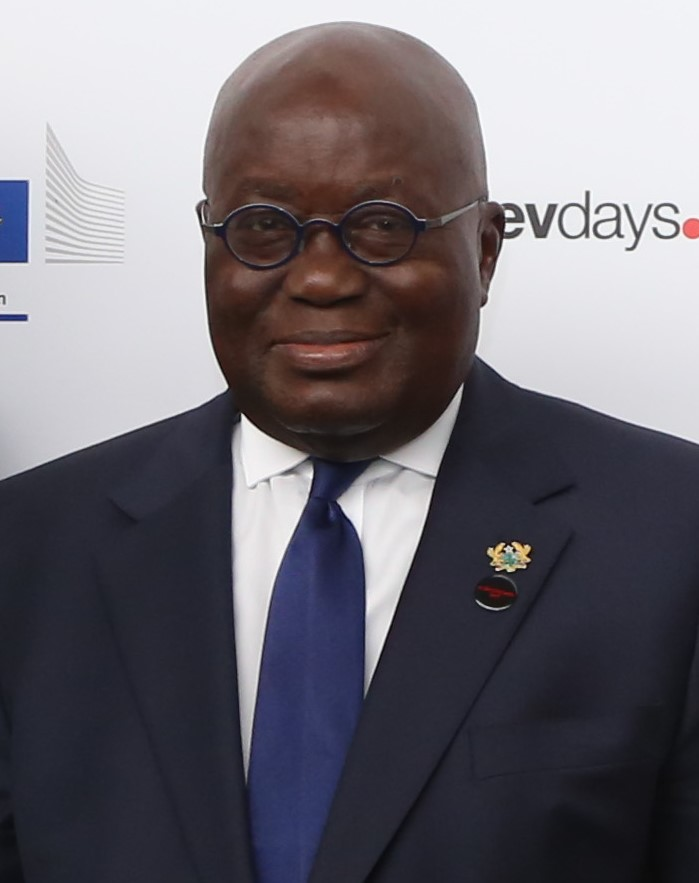
Nominee	John Mahama	Nana Akufo-Addo
Party	NDC	NPP
Running mate	Kwesi Amissah-Arthur	Mahamudu Bawumia
Popular vote	5,574,761	5,248,898
Percentage	50.70%	47.74%
- Results by region
President before election
John Mahama
NDC
Elected President
John Mahama
NDC
- Parliamentary election
- All 275 seats in Parliament; 138 seats needed for a majority
Party	Leader	Vote %	Seats	+/–
NPP	Nana Akufo-Addo	47.51	122	+14
NDC	John Mahama	46.41	148	+33
CPP	Samia Nkrumah	0.73	1	0
PNC	Hassan Ayariga	0.66	1	−1
Independents	–	2.50	3	−1
This lists parties that won seats. See the complete results below.
Speaker before	Speaker after
Joyce Bamford-Addo; Independent	Edward Adjaho; NDC

General elections were held in Ghana on Friday 7 December 2012 to elect a president and members of Parliament in 275 electoral constituencies. Owing to the breakdown of some biometric verification machines, some voters could not vote, and voting was extended to Saturday 8 December 2012. A run-off was scheduled for 28 December 2012 if no presidential candidate received an absolute majority of 50% plus one vote. Competing for presidency were incumbent president John Dramani Mahama of the National Democratic Congress (NDC), his main challenger Nana Akufo-Addo of the New Patriotic Party (NPP) and six other candidates.

Incumbent president John Mahama was declared winner of the presidential contest with 50.7% of the vote, just a few thousand votes over the threshold for avoiding a run-off election. Nana Akufo-Addo received 47.74%. The opposition alleged tampering with results by the Electoral Commission (EC), and filed a petition in a 2012 Ghanaian Presidential Election Petition at the Ghanaian Supreme Court to review the election results. The NPP produced more than 11,000 so-called "pink sheets" to the judges who had to compare them to similar papers from the EC, NDC and possibly other parties. These pink sheets state the results as counted in single polling stations, before aggregating them to any higher level, such as municipality, district and region. The NPP claimed that there were differences between the results as stated immediately after their counting in polling stations, and those which were used in aggregations, and that this can be proven by the pink sheets. In a separate part of the procedure, the EC was challenged to prove that 14,000 expat Ghanaians had voted abroad, and failed to produce any registered voters in foreign countries due to, so EC, the fatal work of a virus in its computer. The election petition led to great changes in the electoral system that helped ensure a high level of transparency in the voting system and collation of the results.

Mahama was elected to a full term less than five months as president having succeeded John Atta Mills, who died suddenly in office in July 2012.

== Preparations ==
=== Biometric voters registration ===
The Electoral Commission of Ghana successfully held a biometric system of registration for the electorate from 24 March 2012 to 5 May 2012. The move was aimed to prevent double registration and to eliminate ghost names in the old register.

=== Electoral demarcations ===
Controversially, 45 additional constituencies were added to the 230 of the 2008 general election. Voting therefore took place in a total of 275 constituencies and 26002 polling stations.

Constituencies in 2012
Region	New Constituencies in 2012	Total seats
Western Region	Kwesimintsim; Mpohor; Bodi; Bia East	26
Central Region	Cape Coast North; Gomoa Central; Awutu Senya; Assin Central	23
Greater Accra	Bortianor–Ngleshie Amanfro; Anyaa/ Sowutuom; Trobu; Ayawaso North; Okaikwei Central; Ablekuma West; Tema Central	34
Volta	Akatsi North; Adaklu; North Dayi; Krachi Nchumuru	26
Eastern	Akuapim South; Asene/Akroso/Monso; Achiase; Atiwa East; Fanteakwa South	33
Ashanti	Obuasi East; Manso Edubia; Atwima Nwabiagya North; Manhyia North; Juaben; Asante Akim North; Sekyere Afram Plains; Ahafo Ano South East	47
Brong-Ahafo	Berekum West; Dormaa West; Banda; Pru West; Sene East	29
Northern	Daboya; Kparibato; Tatale; Sagnarigu East; Yunyoo	31
Upper East	Bolgatanga East; Tempene	15
Upper West	Nandom	11
Total	45 new	275

== Monitoring ==
The Coalition of Domestic Election Observers (CODEO) trained election observers and deployed 4000 of them to monitor the elections nationwide.

Observers from ECOWAS Observer Mission led by former Nigerian president, General Olusegun Obasanjo also monitored the elections. The mission noted the technical glitches caused by faulty biometric machines but added that it had not undermined the fairness and transparency of the election.

== Pre-election controversy ==
There have been accusations against the media for not covering the election in a fair manner.

Following the death of incumbent President John Atta Mills amid concerns for the election, leader of the Electoral Commission of Ghana Kwadwo Afari-Gyan said that "the election calendar remains unchanged—it's purely a party matter" and the National Democratic Congress had to decide whom to nominate as its new candidate.

The main talking point following the close of nominations was the disqualification of Nana Konadu Agyeman Rawlings, leader of the newly formed National Democratic Party. This was due to errors in the documentation presented to the Electoral Commission.

== Presidential candidates ==
Eight candidates were on the ballot.

Party	Candidate name	Religion	Date of birth	Hometown and Region	Highest Educational Qualification	Institution	Present or Last Employer	Position	Profession	Marital Status
People's National Convention	Hassan Ayariga	Muslim	4 September 1972	Bawku, Upper East Region	Ex. Masters in Governance and Leadership	Graduate School of Governance and Leadership	Clean Up Ghana	Managing Director	Accountancy	Married
National Democratic Congress	John Dramani Mahama	Christian	29 November 1958	Bole, Northern Region	Post Graduate Degree	University of Ghana	Government of Ghana	President of the Republic of Ghana	Communications/media	Married
Progressive People's Party	Papa Kwesi Nduom	Catholic	15 February 1953	Elmina, Central Region	PHD	University of Wisconsin	First National Savings and Loans Company	CEO	Management consultant	Married
New Patriotic Party	Nana Addo Dankwa Akufo-Addo	Christian	29 March 1944	Kyebi, Eastern Region	Bsc. Econ	University of Ghana	Government of Ghana	Minister for Foreign Affairs	Legal practitioner	Married
Convention People's Party	Michael Abu Sakara Foster	Christian	15 August 1958	Mankuna, Northern Region	Doctor of Philosophy	University of Reading	Unknown	Executive Director	Agronomist	Married
United Front Party	Akwasi Addai Odike	Christian	13 September 1964	Adwumakase Kese, Ashanti Region	'O' Level	Aduman Secondary School	Odike Ventures	CEO	Businessman	Married
Independent Candidate	Jacob Osei Yeboah	Christian	28 October 1968	Atonsu, Nsuta, Ashanti Region	MBA	University of Warwick	Vital Source Limited	Director for West Africa	Engineering consultant	Married
Great Consolidated Popular Party	Henry Herbert Lartey	Christian	5 February 1954	Osu, Greater Accra Region	MBA Economics and Finance	University of Bath	Unknown	Executive Director	Finance, agriculture, and international trade	Single

=== Running mates ===
The following eight candidates have been approved by their parties and the Electoral Commission of Ghana as running mates of the above listed presidential candidates for the election on 7 December 2012.

Party	Candidate name	Sex	Profession
People's National Convention	Helen Sanorita Dzatugbe Matrevi	F	Bilingual translator
National Democratic Congress	Kwesi Amissah-Arthur	M	Economist
Progressive People's Party	Eva Lokko	F	Engineer
New Patriotic Party	Mahamudu Bawumia	M	Economist
Convention People's Party	Nana Akosua Frimpomaa	F	Social activist
United Front Party	Fred Osei Agyen	M	Agriculturist
Independent Candidate	Kelvin Nii Tackie	M	Business executive
Great Consolidated Popular Party	John Amekah	M	Retired educationist

== Results ==
=== President ===
Candidate	Running mate	Party	Votes	%
John Dramani Mahama	Kwesi Amissah-Arthur	National Democratic Congress	5,574,761	50.70
Nana Akufo-Addo	Mahamudu Bawumia	New Patriotic Party	5,248,898	47.74
Paa Kwesi Nduom	Eva Lokko	Progressive People's Party	64,362	0.59
Henry Herbert Lartey	John Amekah	Great Consolidated Popular Party	38,223	0.35
Ayariga Hassan	Helen Sanorita Dzatugbe Matrevi	People's National Convention	24,617	0.22
Michael Abu Sakara Foster	Nana Akosua Frimpomaa	Convention People's Party	20,323	0.18
Jacob Osei Yeboah	Kelvin Nii Tackie	Independent	15,201	0.14
Akwasi Addai Odike	Fred Osei Agyen	United Front Party	8,877	0.08
Total			10,995,262	100.00
Valid votes			10,995,262	97.76
Invalid/blank votes			251,720	2.24
Total votes			11,246,982	100.00
Registered voters/turnout			14,158,890	79.43
Source: Electoral Commission of Ghana

=== Parliament ===
Party	Votes	%	Seats	+/–
New Patriotic Party	5,248,862	47.51	122	+14
National Democratic Congress	5,127,671	46.41	148	+33
Progressive People's Party	182,649	1.65	0	0
Convention People's Party	81,009	0.73	1	0
People's National Convention	72,618	0.66	1	–1
National Democratic Party	33,857	0.31	0	0
Inter-Party Cooperation	15,561	0.14	0	0
United Front Party	3,322	0.03	0	0
Democratic People's Party	3,013	0.03	0	0
New Vision Party	1,232	0.01	0	0
United Renaissance Party	980	0.01	0	0
Independent People's Party	679	0.01	0	0
Great Consolidated Popular Party	653	0.01	0	0
Yes People's Party	145	0.00	0	0
Ghana Freedom Party	77	0.00	0	0
Independents	275,781	2.50	3	–1
Total	11,048,109	100.00	275	+45
Valid votes	11,048,109	98.41		
Invalid/blank votes	178,243	1.59		
Total votes	11,226,352	100.00		
Registered voters/turnout	15,031,680	74.68		
Source: Electoral Commission of Ghana

== Reactions ==
The non-partisan Coalition of Domestic Election Observers (CODEO), the Economic Community of West African States (ECOWAS) and the African Union (AU) all declared that the elections were, for the most part, free and fair. Despite this, there were still widespread allegations of voting irregularities, though these were dismissed as unsubstantiated by the electoral commission chairman. As a result of these claims, the New Patriotic Party immediately rejected the results upon their release and its candidate, Nana Akufo-Addo, remarked that his party's leaders would be meeting on 11 December to consider their options, one of which is to contest the results by lodging an appeal in court. Violent opposition was however ruled out.

African Union commission chairman Thomas Yayi flew to Ghana to meet with the two men. He was also reported to have congratulated Mahama on his victory, and charged him to preside over an all-inclusive government. Yayi praised the conduct and the participants of the election.

In anticipation of petitions regarding the election, Chief Justice Georgina Theodora Wood has established two public complaints secretariats to swiftly process such concerns.

In a statement after being declared the victor, Mahama gave a reconciliatory message, saying "I wish to welcome my fellow candidates to join me now as partners in the project of nation building and of creating a better Ghana".

== Image gallery ==
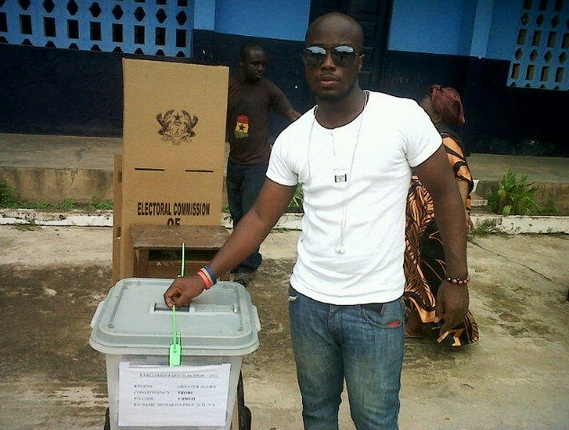
Ghanaians in voting process

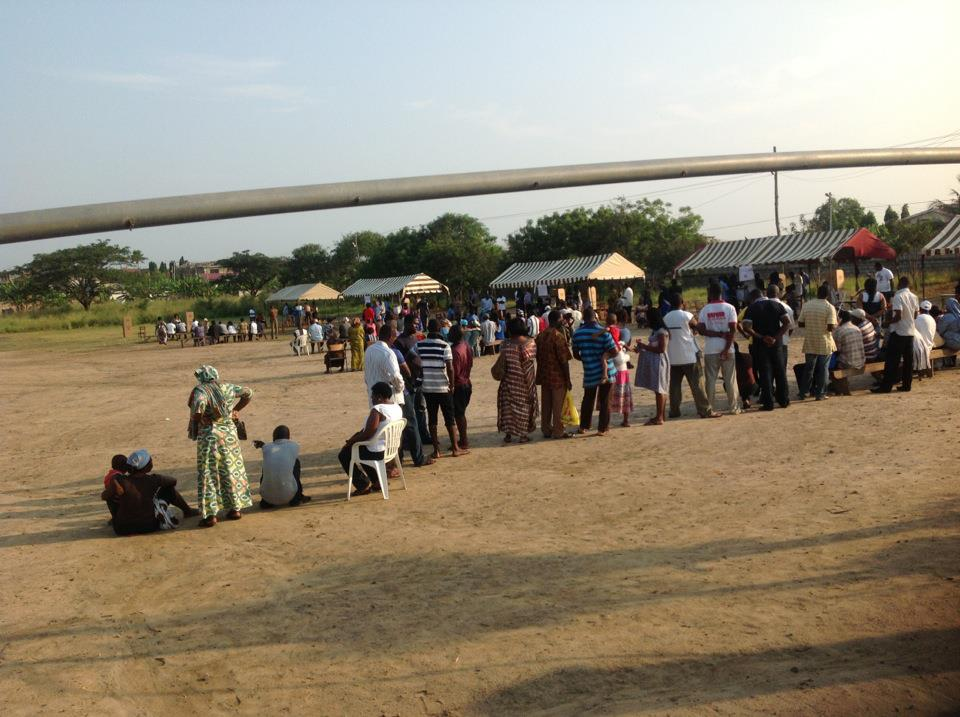
Voters lined up to vote

== See also ==
- List of MPs elected in the 2012 Ghanaian parliamentary election
