= Franklin Winfred K. Aheto =

Ghanaian politician

Hon. Franklin Winfred K. Aheto

Member of Parliament for Ashaiman
- In office 7 January 1993 – 6 January 2001
- President: Jerry John Rawlings; John Kufuor
- Succeeded by: Emmanuel Kinsford Kwesi Teye

Personal details
- Party: National Democratic Congress
- Profession: Politician

Franklin Winfred K. Aheto is a Ghanaian politician and a member of parliament for the first and second parliament of the fourth republic of Ghana for the Ashiaman Constituency in the Greater Accra Region of Ghana.

== Early life and education ==
Aheto is a Ghanaian, a politician and a member of the second parliament of the fourth republic of Ghana. He was elected as a member of parliament for the Ashaiman constituency during the 1996 Ghanaian general elections.

== Politics ==
Aheto represented into parliament for the first time during the 1992 Ghanaian parliamentary election on the ticket of the National Democratic Congress. He was elected for the second time to be a member of parliament for Ashaiman constituency during the 1996 Ghanaian general elections, where he won with a total votes count of 35,212 over his opponents; Doku Joseph-Wills K. K. of the People's Convention Party who polled 1,653 of the total votes count, Herbert Kofi Aggor People's National Convention also polled 1,822 of the total votes count, Samuel Korle Amegah an Independent Candidate also polling 6,663 of the total vote count and Iddrisu Abdel-Kareem of the New Patriotic Party who polled 18,081 of the total votes count.

He held onto it until Hon Emmanuel Kinsford Kwesi Teye of New Patriotic Party took over in 2000 as a result of serious internal wrangling among the membership of the National Democratic Congress in the constituency. Hon. Alfred Kwame Agbesi took the seat back for the NDC in the 2004 elections.

== Personal life ==
Aheto is a Christian.
