= Lambussie (Ghana parliament constituency) =

Constituency in Ghana

- constituency for the Parliament of Ghana
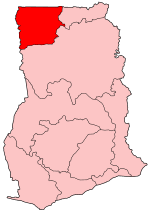
- District: Jirapa/Lambussie District
- Region: Upper West Region of Ghana

Current constituency
- Party: National Democratic Congress
- MP: Titus Kofi Beyuo

Lambussie is one of the constituencies represented in the Parliament of Ghana. It elects one Member of Parliament (MP) by the first past the post system of election. Titus Kofi Beyuo is the member of parliament for the constituency. Lambussie is located in the Jirapa/Lambussie district of the Upper West Region of Ghana.

== Boundaries ==
The seat is located within the Jirapa/Lambussie District of the Upper West Region of Ghana.

== Members of Parliament ==
First elected	Member	Party
1992	Jacob Bawiine Boon	National Democratic Congress
1996	Luke Koo	National Democratic Congress
1999	Alice Teni Boon	National Democratic Congress
2008	John Duoghr Baloroo	New Patriotic Party
2012	Edward K. Dery	National Democratic Congress
2020	Bright Bakye Yelviel Baligi	New Patriotic Party
2024	Titus Kofi Beyuo	National Democratic Congress

== Elections ==
2016 Ghanaian general election:Lambussie
Party	Candidate	Votes	%	±%
National Democratic Congress	Edward K. Dery	8,931	58.29	+5.6
New Patriotic Party	Bakye Yelviel-Dong Baligi	6,110	39.88	+23.85
Independent	Ernest Sanyare Beinpuo	128	0.84	—
Convention People's Party	David Mwinfor Deribaa	101	0.66	−0.46
All People's Congress	Tawiah Kaapeke	51	0.33	—
Majority		2,821	18.41	−8.3
Turnout		15,679	65.8	−15.9
Registered electors		23,823		

2012 Ghanaian general election:Lambussie
Party	Candidate	Votes	%	±%
National Democratic Congress	Edward K. Dery	8,444	52.69	+12.59
Independent	Issakah Sagito	4,164	25.98	—
New Patriotic Party	John Doughr Baloroo	2,569	16.03	−39.37
Progressive People's Party	Beinpuo Ernest Sanyare	423	2.64	—
People's National Convention	Alhassan Zakaria	194	1.21	−0.99
Convention People's Party	David Mwinfor Deribaa	180	1.12	−0.08
National Democratic Party	Amoah Basing	51	0.32	—
Majority		4,280	26.71	+11.41
Turnout		16,818	81.7	+17.2
Registered electors		20,571		

2008 Ghanaian parliamentary election:Lambussie
Party	Candidate	Votes	%	±%
New Patriotic Party	John Duoghr Baloroo	6,513	55.4	—
National Democratic Congress	Alice Teni Boon	4,716	40.1	—
People's National Convention	Amoah T. Basing	261	2.2	—
Convention People's Party	Bele-Irs Vitus	141	1.2	—
Democratic Freedom Party	Baloroo Balisosie David	124	1.1	—
Majority		1,797	15.3	—
Turnout		12,167	64.5	
Registered electors		18,875		

1996 Ghanaian general election:Lambussie
Party	Candidate	Votes	%	±%
National Democratic Congress	Luke Koo	9,785	79.98	—
New Patriotic Party	Anthony Baloroo	1,596	13.04	—
People's National Convention	Alexander Ambreh Bayowoh	854	6.98	—
Majority		8,189	66.94	—
Turnout		12,235	73.19	—
Registered electors		16,717		—

1992 Ghanaian parliamentary election:Lambussie
Party	Candidate	Votes	%	±%
National Democratic Congress	Jacob Bawline Boon	6,510		—
Majority				—
Turnout		6,763	37.5	—
Registered electors		18,022		

== See also ==
- List of Ghana Parliament constituencies
