= Hassan Ayariga =

Ghanaian accountant

- Born: 4 September 1972 (age 53); Bawku, Upper East, Ghana
- Education: Ghana Senior High School (Tamale)
- Occupation: Accountant
- Political party: All People's Congress
- Spouse: Anitta Ayariga
- Children: 5
- Relatives: Mahama Ayariga

Hassan Ayariga (born 4 September 1972) is a Ghanaian accountant and unsuccessful 2016 Ghanaian presidential aspirant. He is the founder of the All People's Congress (APC) and was the candidate of the People's National Convention for the December 2012 presidential election and the December 2024 presidential election

== Early life and education ==
Ayariga spent his childhood in Accra and Bawku, moving to Nigeria with his parents after the overthrow of the Limann administration. He attended Ghana Secondary School in Tamale and then in Nigeria Barewa College in Zaria, but did not earn a degree at Barewa. He eventually studied accounting at the London School of Accountancy, yet likewise neither pursued or acquired any degree.

Ayariga later attended Atlantic International University, an unaccredited university often described as a degree mill. This is not Ayariga's only dubious American educational credential as he is also the recipient of an honorary degree from Reagan National University, an institution likewise reported as a fraud. In 2021, the accreditor of Reagan National University, the Accrediting Council for Independent Colleges and Schools, became unrecognized in the United States due to lax standards. In 2025, Ayariga was warned by the Ghana Tertiary Education Commission to cease using the title of "Dr.", as he has never actually earned any degree from an educational institution currently-accredited by recognized authorities within the country in which it is domiciled.

== Politics ==
In the primaries of the People's National Convention (PNC) for the 2016 general election, Ayariga lost to Edward Mahama, whom he had beaten to become presidential candidate in 2012. Alleging electoral misconduct, he left the party to form a new party, the All People’s Congress (APC), in 2016. The Electoral Commission of Ghana handed the party a provisional certificate after he met the requisite requirements, and it had since been granted a final certificate.

Due to errors with paperwork, Ayariga was disqualified from the ballot in the 2016 Ghanaian general election. In response, Ayariga launched claims of electoral misconduct not unlike those he had earlier leveled at the People's National Convention.

== Personal life ==
His father, Frank Abdulai Ayariga, was a member of parliament for the Bawku Constituency during the third republic administration of Hilla Limann and his mother, Anatu Ayariga, a business woman.

His younger brother Mahama Ayariga was Ghanaian Minister for Youth and Sports from 2013-2015, and he is the current Ghanaian Member of Parliament for the Bawku Central Constituency.

Hassan Ayariga lived and worked in Germany for many years and has business interests in both Ghana and Germany. He is married and has 5 children.

Party political offices
Preceded by Edward Mahama	People's National Convention presidential candidate 2012	Succeeded by Edward Mahama
New title	All People's Congress Presidential Candidate; 2016, 2020	Incumbent
