= John Duoghr Baloroo =

Ghanaian politician

John Duoghr Baloroo (born 17 December 1956) is a Ghanaian politician and member of the Fifth Parliament of the Fourth Republic of Ghana. He represented the Lambuissie constituency of the Upper West Region of Ghana.

== Early life and education ==
Baloroo was born on 17 December 1956. He is a native of Lambussie in the Upper West Region of Ghana. He studied at City and Guilds in 1984.

== Career and politics ==
He is a businessman and the managing director of his company John Duoghr Construction. He was first elected into parliament in 2008 Ghanaian General Election on the ticket of the New Patriotic Party. He won a total of 6,513 representing 55.4% out of the total valid votes cast of 11,755. He won against Alice Teni Boon who won 4,716 votes, Amoah T. Basing who won 261 votes, Baloroo Balisosie David who won124 votes, Bele-Irs Vitus who also won 141 votes which represented 40.1%, 2.2%, 1.1%, 1.2% respectively.

He succeeded Alice Teni Boon of the National Democratic Congress and was preceded by Edward Kaale-Ewola Dery of the National Democratic Congress.

== Personal life ==
He is married with three children and a Catholic.

== See also ==
- Lambussie Constituency (Ghana parliamentary constituency).
