= Alhassan Andani =

Ghanaian (born 2018)

Chief of Pishigu Alhassan Andani

Chief of Pishigu
- Incumbent
- Assumed office 14 May 2018

Personal details
- Born: November 24, 1960 Banvim, Tamale, Ghana
- Citizenship: Ghanaian
- Relatives: Naa Andani (grandfather)
- Occupation: Economist, Banker
- Known for: Former CEO of Stanbic Bank Ghana
- Other roles: Chairman of Ecobank Bank Ghana

Alhassan Andani (born 24 November 1960) is a Ghanaian economist and grandson of Naa Andani who ruled Dagbon in the colonial era. He is the founder and chairman of Leadership Vision Strategy Africa. Mr.Andani is a former chief executive director of Stanbic bank. He holds the position of Chairman of Council for Scientific & Industrial Research, Chairman of SOS Children's Villages Ghana and serves on the board of Gold Fields Limited. Alhassan Andani is Independent Non-Executive Director of the company. Mr Andani is a former CEO and executive director of Stanbic Bank Ghana; the board chairperson of the Ghana Council for Scientific and Industrial Research (CSIR), a director of SOS Villages Ghana, and has held other corporate directorships in the past. He holds a BSc in (Agriculture), University of Ghana; MA (Banking and Finance), Finafrica Institute in Italy.

== Early life and education ==
Andani was born in Banvim, a suburb of Tamale on November 24, 1960. He attended one of the most prestigious senior high schools in the north, called Ghana Senior High School. He then proceeded to the University of Ghana where he earned a 4-year undergraduate degree in Agriculture. He holds a master's degree in Banking and Finance from Finafrica Institute in Milan, Italy. Andani is also an alumnus of the Oxford Strategic Leadership Programme, and holds an International Management Certificate from INSEAD, Chartered Bank.

== Career ==
Andani began his career at the then SSB Bank Limited in 1984, and then rose through the ranks to become the regional project manager in the Upper Regions in 1987. He was a deputy managing director of Barclays Bank Ghana before joining Stanbic Bank. Currently, he is the chairman of the Council for Scientific & Industrial Research, chairman of SOS Children's Villages Ghana and chief executive officer and executive director at Stanbic Bank Ghana Ltd. He was also appointed by Gold Fields Limited as an independent non-executive director to its board of directors on August 1, 2016. He sits on the board of several companies, amongst them are Savana Agricultural Research Institute (SARI), JA International Group Of Companies, Savannah Accelerated Development Authority (SADA), Ghana Home Loans Company Limited, TV Africa, and RLG Communications (Ghana) Limited.

Effective Thursday, 26th March 2026, He was appointed the Board Chairman of Ecobank. According to the Managing Director of Ecobank Ghana, Abena Osei-Poku, "His appointment reinforces Ecobank's commitment to strong governance, strategic leadership, and sustainable growth".

== Kinship ==
On May 14, 2018, Andani was enskinned as the chief of Pishigu in the northern region. He is the grandson of Naa Andani, who ruled Dagbon in the colonial era. Due to his lineage, he is legally qualified according to the customs and traditions to be enskined the chief of Pishigu.
