= Jacob Bawiine Boon =

Ghanaian politician

Member of Parliament for Lambussie
- In office 7 January 1993 – 6 January 1997
- President: Jerry John Rawlings
- Preceded by: Constituency merged
- Succeeded by: Luke Koo

Personal details
- Born: 23 December 1956 (age 69) Lambussie, Upper West Region, Gold Coast (now Ghana)
- Party: National Democratic Congress
- Education: University of Ghana; Ghana School of Law
- Occupation: Politician
- Profession: Lawyer

Jacob Bawiine Boon (born 23 December 1956) is a Ghanaian politician and a member of the First Parliament of the Fourth Republic representing the Lambuissie Constituency in the Upper West Region of Ghana.

== Early life and education ==
Boon was born on 23 December 1956 at Lambussie in the Upper West Region of Ghana. He had his secondary education at the Tamale Secondary School, Tamale, after which he proceeded to the University of Ghana, where he obtained his Bachelor of Laws degree. He attended the Ghana School of Law where he obtained his Barrister-at-Law certificate, thereby qualifying as a lawyer.

== Politics ==
He was elected into parliament on the ticket of the National Democratic Congress to represent the Lambussie Constituency in the Upper West Region of Ghana during the 1992 Ghanaian parliamentary election. He was succeeded by Luke Koo in the 1996 General election. Luke polled 9,785 votes out of the total valid vote cast representing 58.50% against Anthony Baloroo of the New Patriotic Party who polled 1,596 votes representing 9.50%, and Alexander Ambreh Bayowoh of the People's National Convention who polled 854 votes representing 5.10%.

== Career ==
He is a lawyer by profession and a former member of parliament for the Lambussie Constituency in the Upper West Region of Ghana.

== Personal life ==
Boon is a traditionalist. He is married to Alice Teni Boon who also once served as a member of parliament for the Lambuissie Constituency.
