= Savelugu (Ghana parliament constituency) =

Ghana parliament constituency

- constituency for the Parliament of Ghana
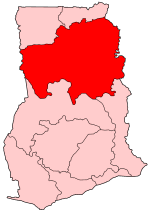
- District: Savelugu Municipality
- Region: Northern Region of Ghana

Current constituency
- Party: New Patriotic Party
- MP: Abdul Aziz Fatahiya

Savelugu is one of the constituencies represented in the Parliament of Ghana. It elects one member of parliament (MP) by the first-past-the-post system of election. Abdul Aziz Fatahiya is the current member of parliament for the constituency. Savelugu is located in the Northern Region of Ghana. Hajia Mary Salifu Boforo served the constituency as a member of parliament in the 2nd, 3rd, 4th, 5th and 6th parliament of the Fourth Republic of Ghana. She was elected on the ticket of the National Democratic Congress (NDC) and won a majority of 6,434 votes more than candidate closest in the race to win the constituency election, becoming the MP. She had earlier represented the constituency in the 4th Republican parliament.

The constituency was initially known as Savelugu- Nanton municipal district until it was elevated to Savelugu municipality prior to the 2012 Ghanaian general election.

== Boundaries ==
Savelugu constituency shares boundaries with West Mamprusi Municipal to the north, Karaga District to the east, Kumbungu District to the west and Tamale Metropolitan Assembly to the south.

According to the 2021 population and housing census, the population of the municipality stands at 122,888 with 60,390 males and 62,498 females.

== Members of Parliament ==
Election	Member	Party
1996	Mary Salifu Boforo	National Democratic Congress
2000	Mary Salifu Boforo	National Democratic Congress
2004	Mary Salifu Boforo	National Democratic Congress
2008	Mary Salifu Boforo	National Democratic Congress
2012	Mary Salifu Boforo	National Democratic Congress
2016	Abdul-Samed Muhamed Gunu	New Patriotic Party
2020	Jacob Iddriss Abdulai	National Democratic Congress
2024	Abdul Aziz Fatahiya	New Patriotic Party

== Elections ==
The table below shows the parliamentary election results for Savelugu constituency in the 1996 Ghanaian general election.

1996 Ghanaian general election: Savelugu Source:Ghana Home Page
Party	Candidate	Votes	%	±%
National Democratic Congress	Mary Salifu Boforo	14,971	50.90	—
New Patriotic Party	Alhassan Abdulai Abubakari	5,585	19.00	—
Convention People's Party	Bawa Muhammed Baba	2,108	7.20	—
People's National Convention	Baba Issah	426	1.40	—
Majority		14,971	50.90	—

The below table shows the parliamentary election results for Savelugu constituency during the 2000 Ghanaian general election.

2000 Ghanaian general election: Savelugu Source:Ghana Home Page
Party	Candidate	Votes	%	±%
National Democratic Congress	Mary Salifu Boforo	13,725	63.90	—
New Patriotic Party	Alhassan Abdulai Abubakari	6,029	28.10	—
Convention People's Party	Yakubu Abdulai	1,097	5.10	—
People's National Convention	Mahama Iddrisu	308	1.40	—
NRP	Ahamed S Yakubu	225	1.00	—
UGM	Mohammed Yussif	108	0.50	—
Majority		13,725	63.90	—

The following table shows the parliamentary election results for Savelugu constituency during the 2004 Ghanaian general election.

2004 Ghanaian general election: Savelugu Source:Ghana Home Page
Party	Candidate	Votes	%	±%
National Democratic Congress	Mary Salifu Boforo	19,837	66.60	—
New Patriotic Party	Alhassan Abdulai Abubakari	9,455	31.70	—
People's National Convention	Mahama Iddrisu	279	0.90	—
Democratic People's Party	Yakubu Abass	214	0.70	—
Majority		19,837	66.60	—

The below table shows the parliamentary election results for Savelugu constituency in the 2008 Ghanaian general election.

2008 Ghanaian general election: Savelugu Source:Ghana Home Page
Party	Candidate	Votes	%	±%
National Democratic Congress	Mary Salifu Boforo	17,056	56.68	—
New Patriotic Party	Alhassan Abdulai Abubakari	10,622	35.92	—
IND	Abdallah Abass	852	2.88	—
Convention People's Party	Alhassan Ahmed Awal	366	1.24	—
People's National Convention	Mahama Iddrisu	183	0.62	—
DFP	Abdul Aziz Ziblim	173	0.59	—
NVP	Mohammed Yushawu	160	0.54	—
Democratic People's Party	Abdulai Mashoud Gbambegu	158	0.53	—
Majority		17,056	56.68	—

The following table shows the parliamentary election results for Savelugu constituency in the 2012 Ghanaian general election.

2012 Ghanaian general election: Savelugu Source:Ghana Home Page
Party	Candidate	Votes	%	±%
National Democratic Congress	Mary Salifu Boforo	18,946	53.28	—
New Patriotic Party	Abdul-Samed Muhamed Gunu	15,083	42.42	—
Progressive People's Party	Muniru Hardi	1,235	3.47	—
Convention People's Party	Musah Osman	175	0.49	—
People's National Convention	Mahama Iddrisu	121	0.34	—
Majority		18,946	53.28	—

The table below shows the parliamentary election results for Savelugu constituency in the 2016 Ghanaian general election.

2016 Ghanaian general election: Savelugu Source:Ghana Home Page
Party	Candidate	Votes	%	±%
New Patriotic Party	Abdul-Samed Muhamed Gunu	13,334	34.21	—
IND	Alhassan Iddrisu	12,623	32.39	—
National Democratic Congress	Alhassan Abdulai Red	12,590	32.31	—
Progressive People's Party	Muniru Hardi	219	0.56	—
Convention People's Party	Ibrahim Mohammed Awal	118	0.30	—
People's National Convention	Sahadu Yussif Dasana	88	0.23	—
Majority		13,334	34.21	—

The below table shows the parliamentary election results for Savelugu constituency in the 2020 Ghanaian general election.

2020 Ghanaian general election: Savelugu Source:Ghana Home Page
Party	Candidate	Votes	%	±%
National Democratic Congress	Jacob Iddriss Abdulai	19,577	50.13	—
New Patriotic Party	Abdul-Samed Muhamed Gunu	19,478	49.87	—
People's National Convention	Haruna Zakaria	0	0.00	—
IND	Alhassan Iddrisu	0	0.00	—
Majority		19,577	50.13	—

== See also ==
- List of Ghana Parliament constituencies
