= Emmanuel Kinsford Kwesi Teye =

Ghanaian politician

Hon. Emmanuel Kinsford Kwesi Teye

Member of Parliament for Ashaiman Constituency
- In office 7 January 2001 – 6 January 2005
- President: John Kufuor

Personal details
- Party: New Patriotic Party
- Profession: Politician

Emmanuel Kinsford Kwesi Teye is a Ghanaian politician and was the member of parliament for the Ashaiman constituency in the Greater Accra region of Ghana. He was a member of parliament in the 3rd parliament of the 4th republic of Ghana.

== Politics ==
Teye is a member of the New Patriotic Party. He was elected as the member of parliament for the Ashaiman constituency in the Greater Accra region in the 3rd parliament of the 4th republic of Ghana. He was succeeded by Kwame Alfred Agbesi in the 2004 Ghanaian General elections.

== Elections ==
Teye was elected as the member of parliament for the Ashaiman constituency in the 2000 Ghanaian general elections. He was elected on the ticket of the New Patriotic Party. His constituency was a part of the 16 parliamentary seats out of 22 seats won by the New Patriotic Party in that election for the Greater Accra Region. The New Patriotic Party won a majority total of 100 parliamentary seats out of 200 seats in the 3rd parliament of the 4th republic of Ghana. He was elected with 21,894 votes out of 60,083 total valid votes cast. This was equivalent to 36.9% of the total valid votes cast. He was elected over Alfred Kwame Agbesi and Nana Kwame Aboagye-Asare, two independent candidates, Franklin W. K. Aheto of the National Democratic Congress, Doli Tetteh of the People's National Convention, Emmanuel Osabutey of the National Reform Party, Samuel Korku Amegah of the United Ghana Movement and Joseph-Willis Kugblenu Doku of the Convention People's Party. These obtained 20,088, 741, 12,607, 1,134, 1,115, 922, and 874 votes respectively out of the total valid votes cast. These were equivalent to 33.8%, 1.2%, 1.9%, 1.9%,1.6%, and 1.5% respectively of total valid votes cast.
