= Fati Seidu =

Ghanaian politician

Hon. Fati Seidu

Member of the Ghana Parliament for Bawku Central
- In office 1997–2001
- Preceded by: Hawa Yakubu
- Succeeded by: Hawa Yakubu

Personal details
- Born: Ghana
- Party: National Democratic Congress

Fati Seidu is a Ghanaian politician who was the member of the Second parliament of the Fourth republic representing the Bawku Central constituency in the Upper East Region of Ghana.

== Politics ==
She contested for the Bawku Central seat on the ticket of the National Democratic Congress (NDC) during the 1996 parliamentary election and won polling 30,045 votes out of the 54,327 valid votes cast which represented 42.80% of the entire votes cast against Hawa Yakubu who polled 21,493 votes which represented 30.60% of the entire votes cast and Awini Emmanuel Akami who polled 2,789 votes representing 4.00%.

She lost the seat however during the 2000 parliamentary election to Hawa Yakubu but demanded a recount of the votes as she claimed counting of the votes by the Electoral Commission had been interrupted by violence in the area. The violence according to the police even though political, had evolved into a tribal conflict between the Mamprusis and the Kusasis.

In 2004, she was replaced by Mahama Ayariga as the parliamentary candidate of the NDC for the Bawku Central constituency. Ayariga went on to win the seat during the 2004 parliamentary election and consequently unseated the then incumbent member of parliament, Hawa Yakubu. She once served on the council of the University for Development Studies.

== See also ==
- 1996 parliamentary election
- Walewale (Ghana parliament constituency)
