= Kakpagyili =

Kakpagyili is a suburb of the Tamale Metropolis in the Northern Region of Ghana. Kakpagyili is a community in the Tamale Metropolitan Assembly (TMA) and part of the Tamale South Constituency with Hon. Haruna Iddrisu as the Member of Parliament (MP). The Local Chief of Kakpagyili Community is called Gumanaa. It shares boundaries with Banvum, Bilpiela, Zujuŋ and Tuutiŋli.

== Economic activities ==
- Trading
- Farming

== List of Kakpagyili Chiefs ==
- Gumanaa Fusheni (current Chief)
- Gumanaa Aliru
- Gumanaa Amaru
- Gumanaa Lansa

== Sub-Communities in Kakpagyili ==
- Kukpegu
- Zohi Fong
- Loloto Fong
- Gunzugu
- Niima Fong

== List of Senior High Schools ==
- Presbyterian Senior High School (PRESEC ), Bamvum campus
- Timtooni Senior High School
- Ghana Libya Senior High School
- Majidiya Islamic Senior High School

== key Landmarks ==
- Kakpagyili Chief's Palace
- Kakpagyili CHPS Compound
- SIC Quarters
- I no go sale building materials
- ZEN Filling Station
- Kakpayili Market
- Celsbridge Enterprise Company Limited

== See also ==
- Suburbs of Tamale (Ghana) metropolis
