= Adamu Daramani Sakande =

Ghanaian politician (1962–2020)

Hon. Adamu Daramani Sakande

Member of Ghana Parliament for Bawku Central Constituency
- In office 7 January 2009 – 6 January 2013
- Preceded by: Mahama Ayariga
- Succeeded by: Mahama Ayariga

Personal details
- Born: 6 May 1962 Bawku, Upper East Region Ghana)
- Died: 22 September 2020 (aged 58) London, United Kingdom
- Party: New Patriotic Party
- Education: Portsmouth University
- Occupation: Politician
- Profession: Manager

Adamu Daramani Sakande (6 May 1962 – 22 September 2020) was a Ghanaian politician and a member of the Fifth Parliament of the Fourth Republic for the Bawku Central Constituency, in the Upper East Region of Ghana.

== Early life and education ==
Adamu was born on 6 May 1962, in Bawku, in the Upper East Region of Ghana. He attended the Portsmouth University, NHS-UK and studied Counter Fraud and Security Management Service Accredited SMS in 2003.

== Politics ==
Adamu was first elected into Parliament during the December 2008 Ghanaian general election on the ticket of the New Patriotic Party (NPP) as a member of Parliament for the Bawku Central Constituency in the Upper East Region. During the elections, he polled 20,157 votes out of the 37,719 votes representing 53.4%. He served only one term as a Parliamentarian.

== Career ==
Adamu worked with the NHS Primary Case Trust, London. He was a member of Parliament for the Bawku Central Constituency in the Upper East Region of Ghana.

== Trail and imprisonment ==
Adamu was found guilty of perjury and forgery. He was therefore jailed for two years concurrently on all counts. He was alleged to have, before the 2008 elections, made a false statement in an application to have his name registered in the voters' register and subsequently went ahead to vote in the December 2008 general elections when he was not entitled to do so. A cattle dealer stated that Daramani held both British and Burkinabe passports. His lawyer appealed to the court to lessen the intensity of the ruling due to some health concerns of Adamu.

== Personal life ==
Adamu was married with two children. He belonged to the Islamic Religion (Muslim). Adamu suffered from ill health since at least 2003, and died on 22 September 2020 in London.
