= Frank Abdulai Ayariga =

Ghanaian politician

Hon Frank Asumah Abdulai Ayariga

Member of the Ghana Parliament for Bawku
- In office Sep 1979 – Dec 1981

Personal details
- Party: People's National Party
- Spouse: Anatu Ayariga
- Relations: Hassan Ayariga; Mahama Ayariga
- Children: 11
- Profession: Politician

Frank Asumah Abdulai Ayariga was the first Member of Parliament for Bawku during the Third Republic of Ghana.

== Politics ==
Ayariga was a member of the People's National Party which was also formed the government in power between 1979 and 1981. Following the overthrow of Hilla Limann's government by the Jerry Rawlings-led Provisional National Defence Council on 31 December 1981, Ayariga left for exile in Nigeria. He stayed there for six years, only returning to Ghana in 1987 after he had been cleared of corruption.

== Family ==
Ayariga's family hails from Tinsungo in Bawku in the Upper East Region of Ghana. He was also a member of the Kusasi Royal Family. He was married to Anatu Ayariga. He had eleven children.

His third child, Hassan Ayariga was the presidential candidate for the People's National Convention in the Ghanaian presidential election in December 2012. Mahama Ayariga, a younger son of his 2nd Wife is the MP for Bawku and a former Deputy Minister of Trade and Industry and later Education.

== See also ==
- MPs elected in the Ghanaian parliamentary election, 1979

Parliament of Ghana
New title	MP for Bawku; 1979 – 1981	parliament dissolved after coup
