= Mary Salifu Boforo =

Ghanaian politician (1951–2025)

Hon. Mary Salifu Boforo

Member of the Ghana Parliament for Savelugu
- In office 1996–2017
- Succeeded by: Hon. Abdul-Samed Muhamed Gunu
- President: John Dramani Mahama
- President: John Atta Mills; John Mahama

Personal details
- Born: 25 February 1951 Savelugu, Northern Territories of the Gold Coast
- Died: 13 December 2025 (aged 74) Greater Accra Region, Ghana
- Party: National Democratic Congress
- Education: National Vocational Training Institute

Mary Salifu Boforo (25 February 1951 – 13 December 2025) was a Ghanaian politician who was a Member of Parliament for the Savelugu constituency in the Northern Region. She served as an MP from 1996 until 2017, but lost out in the primaries to contest the 2016 election.

== Early life ==
Mary Salifu Boforo was born on 25 February 1951 in Savelugu, in the Northern Territories of the Gold Coast. Before becoming a member of parliament, she owned a bakery and farming business; and also worked in the banking industry. She had vocational training at National Vocational Training Institute in 1972.

== Political life ==
From January 1997, Boforo was the Member of Parliament for the Savelugu constituency. In 2014, she became First Deputy Majority Chief Whip. She was the longest serving Member of Parliament, but in 2016 while attempting to be selected for her constituency for the sixth time, she lost in the primary vote to Alhassan Abdulai Red. This meant that she left Parliament in 2017. She commented after the vote that this could have the effect of suppressing the views of women in the Northern Region.

Boforo was a strong advocate for the empowerment of women and children affairs as she served on the Ghana Developing Communities Association as the lead Advocate and Chairperson of Ghana’s Parliamentary Women's Caucus. She became well known in Ghana after she published a report in Parliament which stated "The fight for equality between men and women goes beyond the case made for social justice but rather a fundamental human right that must be achieved." Despite losing her seat, she advocated a greater role for women in leading West Africa and said that what she had managed to achieve in her region was evidence that women could improve the infrastructure for the betterment of the people.

=== 1996 elections ===
Boforo was first voted into parliament on 7 January 1997 after she was pronounced winner at the 1996 Ghanaian General Elections. She defeated Alhassan Abudulai Abubakari of the New Patriotic Party and Bawa Muhammed Baba of the Convention People's Party by obtaining 50.90% of the total valid votes cast which is equivalent to 14,971 votes while her counterparts both shared 19.00% and 7.20% which is equivalent to 5,585 votes and 2,108 votes respectively.

== Personal life and death ==
Boforo was married with four children. She was a practising Muslim.

Boforo died in the Greater Accra region on 13 December 2025, at the age of 74. Her burial, in accordance with Islamic rites, was scheduled 15 December, at the Savelugu Public Cemetery.
