= Sumniboma =

- Village
- Location of Sumniboma in Northern region, North Ghana
- Coordinates: 10°33′00″N 00°18′00″W
- Country: Ghana
- Region: Northern Region
- District: East Mamprusi District
- Elevation: 414 m (1,358 ft)
- Time zone: UTC
  - Summer (DST): GMT

Sumniboma is a village in the East Mamprusi District, a district in the Northern Region of north Ghana. Edward Mahama, leader of the People's National Convention was born in Sumniboma.
