= Abdul Aziz Fatahiya =

Ghanaian politician

Abdul Aziz Fatahiya (born March 21, 1982) is a Ghanaian politician who is a member of the ninth Parliament of the fourth republic of Ghana representing Savelugu (Ghana parliament constituency) in the Northern Region of Ghana. She is a member of the New Patriotic Party (NPP).

She has been a member of the New Patriotic Party since she was at the age of 18

== Educational ==
Abdul Aziz Fatahiya obtained her Senior High School Certificate from Ghana Senior High School(Ghanasco).

Hajia Fatahiya holds a Master of Science Degree in Supply Chain Management from the Coventry University in the United Kingdom and also holds a Bsc in Banking and Finance from the University of Professional Studies, Accra.

== Membership Committee ==
Fatahiya since being sworn in as the member of Parliament for Savelugu Constituency, has been appointed unto the following committees;

- Gender, Children and Social Welfare- Deputy Ranking Member
- Sanitation and Water Resources - member
- Ethics and Standard - Member
