= Nsiah =

Nsiah is a surname. Notable people with the surname include:

- Christian Nsiah (born 1975), Ghanaian sprinter
- Gabby Nsiah Nketiah, Ghanaian businessman and politician
- Philippe Nsiah (born 1994), French footballer
- Vida Nsiah (born 1976), Ghanaian sprinter and hurdler
- Nana Owusu-Nsiah, Ghanaian police officer and diplomat
