= Luke Koo =

Ghanaian politician (died 1999)

Member of Parliament for Lambussie Constituency
- In office 7 January 1997 – 20 April 1999
- President: Jerry John Rawlings
- Preceded by: Jacob Bawline Boon
- Succeeded by: Alice Teni Boon

Personal details
- Died: 20 April 1999
- Party: National Democratic Congress

Luke Koo (died 20 April 1999) was a Ghanaian politician and member of the 2nd parliament of the 4th republic of Ghana representing Lambussie constituency under the membership of the National Democratic Congress (NDC).

== Political career ==
Koo began his political career in 1996 when he was named the political candidate to represent his constituency at the 1996 Ghanaian General Elections. He contested under the membership of NDC. He was pronounced winner after defeating Anthony Baloroo of the New Patriotic Party (NPP) and Alexander Ambreh Bayowoh of the People's National Convention (PNC). He claimed 58.50% of the total valid votes which is equivalent to 9,785 votes while his opponents (Anthony Baloroo and Alexander Ambreh Bayowoh) obtained 9.50% which is equivalent to 1,596 votes and 5.10% which is equivalent to 854 votes respectively. He died after a brief illness on 20 April 1999 therefore couldn't complete his tenure in person but his seat was left vacant. Following his death, a by-election was held on 26 May 1999 - Alice Teni Boon (NDC) won the seat with a majority of 4,488.

== Personal life and death ==
Koo was a Christian. He died on 20 April 1999.
