= Ghana Senior High School =

Ghana Senior High School may refer to:

- Ghana Senior High School, Koforidua (GHANASS)
- Ghana Senior High School (Tamale) (GHANASCO)
