= Ghana Senior High School (Tamale) =

Secondary school in Ghana

Coordinates: 9.39694°N 0.81654°W

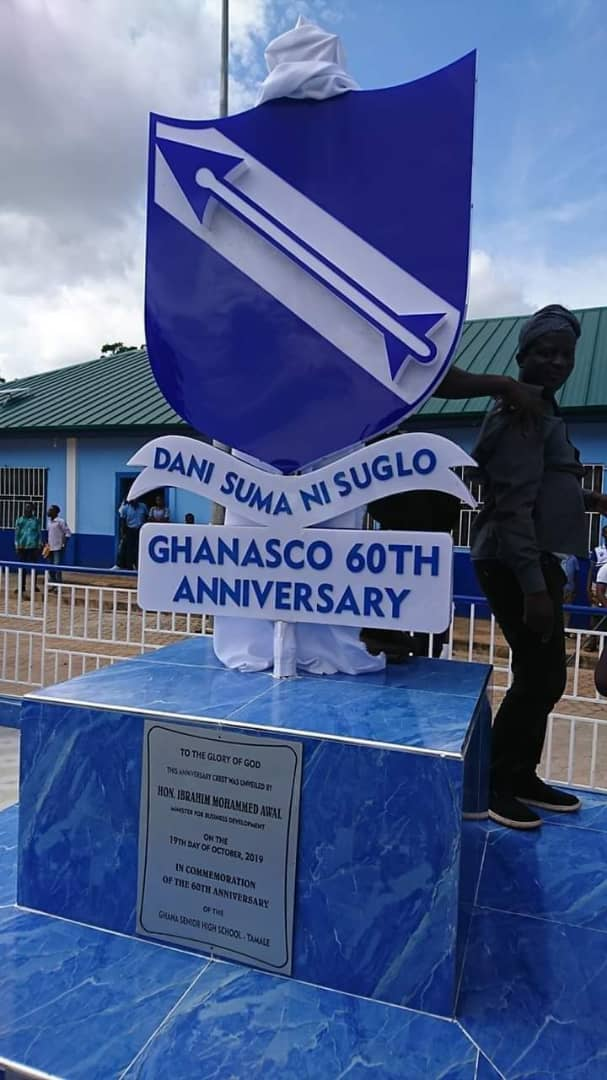
- Tamale, Northern Region; Ghana

Information
- Former name: Ghana College
- Established: 1960; 66 years ago
- Head teacher: Mr. Douglas Haruna Yakubu
- Enrollment: c.4448

Ghana Senior High School (Ghanasco) is a co-educational second cycle institution located in Tamale, Northern Region of Ghana.

== History ==
Ghanasco was originally called Ghana College. The school was established in 1960 by the Government of Ghana, under Kwame Nkrumah, as one of the Ghana Education Trust Schools. The school was established as part of the government acceleralated development plan to provide human resources for the technological and industrial running of the country. The school has a population of 2,800 students.

The name Ghana College was changed to Ghana Secondary School in the month of June 1970. In that same year 22nd day of June 1970, they had written a history with Mr. Lalaji, a mathematics teacher with his science students launched their invented rocket in the school with the Minister for Education Williams Offori-Attah in attendance. The School admitted and prepared students to sit the G.C.E Ordinary Level examinations in the Science and Arts programmes at its inception. It has a student population of about more than 2,800. It is the second largest school in the northern region after Tamale Senior High School (Tamasco). The first headmaster of the school was Kenneth Luther Purser, a Jamaican. Master Abu Kassim Tahidu from Kwame Danso in the Brong Ahafo region of Ghana was the first Senior Prefect.

== Key areas ==
The administration block, the old dining hall, the new larger dining hall/ jams hall, the arts/ PTA block, the science block, the science laboratories including home economics laboratory, the mosque, Nkrumah house, Gbewaa house, Cabral/Gbanzaba house, Dakpema and purser house and also B.A fuseini house which was commissioned in 2024 are boys dormitories. The girls dormitories include; indice 1, indice 2 house, annex 1, annex 2 house and Lordina house, the headmaster's bungalow and the teachers' bungalows. The Ghanasco dam is used by surrounding communities including Kukuo and students of Ghana Senior High School.

== Courses offered ==
The institution provides five main academic programs.

- General Arts
- General Science
- Business
- Home Economics
- Visual Arts
- Agricultural Science

== Anniversaries ==
On the 25th May 2025, GHANASCO's 65th anniversary was officially launched by the First Lady Lordina Mahama.

== School Profile ==
=== Category ===
The School belongs to category A.

=== Motto ===
The motto of Ghanasco is Dani Suma ni Suglo meaning "Good intentions and Patience"

=== Status ===
The School is Day and Boarding.

=== Code ===
The identification code is 0080102

=== Color ===
The main colors of Ghanasco is Blue and White.

=== Gender ===
The School is a mixture of males and females.

== Achievements ==
In 2019, the school beat Armed Forces Senior High School and New Juaben Senior High School in the Ghana National Science and Maths Quiz, which qualified them to the quarter-finals in 2019.

In June 1970, a historic feat was chalked by the school when Mr. Lalaji, a mathematics teacher and his science students invented a rocket. On 22 June 1970, the rocket was launched in the school with the Minister of Education Mr. William Offori-Attah in attendance.

In June 2024, Ghana Senior High School, Tamale (GHANASCO) beat their rivals, Tamale Senior High School (TAMASCO), and St. Francis Xavier school to win the Northern Regional Zonal Championship of the National Science and Math Quiz competition.

== Former headmasters ==
Year	Name
1960–1964	Mr. Kenneth L. Purser
1964–1967	Mr. B. O. Ayittey
1967–1969	Mr. A. F. Clayton
Sept. 1969–1970	Mr. W. A. Ofori
1970–1973	Mr. Adu
1973–1981	Alhaji B. A. Fuseini
1981–1982	Mr. Mahama Adam (AG)
1982–1983	Mr. S. M. Amankwa
1983–1986	Mr. Mahama Adam (AG)
1986–1988	Mr. L. M. Awuni (AG)
1988–1990	Mr. E. K. Kudiabor
1990–1991	Mr. A. A. Daramanu
1991–1998	Mr. Bolina Saaka
1998–2001	Alhaji Amadu Belko
Feb. 2001 – Oct. 2001	Mrs. Mary Asobayire Dan-Braimah (AG)
Oct. 2001–2004	Alhaji Mahamadu Saani Abdul-Rahman
2005–2008	Alhaji T. A. Mahama
2004–2005	Mr. J. B. Dakorah
2008–2016	Mrs. Mary Asobayire Dan-Braimah
2016–2021	Hajia Amina Musah
2021–2022	Mr. Mohammed Yakubu Mustapha
2022–Present	Mr. Douglas Haruna Yakubu

== Notable alumni ==
See also, Category:Ghana Senior High School (Tamale) alumni

- Abdulai Abanga
- Joseph Bawa Akamba
- Yakubu Alhassan
- Alhassan Andani
- Moses Asaga
- Dr. Ibrahim Mohammed Awal
- Hassan Ayariga
- Mahama Ayariga
- Kwame Ayew
- Nayon Bilijo
- Sulley Gariba
- Abdul-Samed Muhamed Gunu
- John Jinapor
- John Dramani Mahama
- Lordina Mahama
- Ibrahim Murtala Mohammed
- Abedi Pele
- Alhassan Suhuyini
- Prof Nafiu Amidu
- Alhassan Umar
- Abdul Aziz Fatahiya
- Alhassan Abdul-Mumin
- Prof. Felix Kofi Abagaale

== See also ==
- List of senior high schools in Ghana
