= Sulley Gariba =

Ghanaian policy analyst and evaluation specialist (1958–2021)

Sulley Gariba (4 May 1958 – 27 April 2021) was a policy analyst and evaluation specialist who served as an advisor to the former president of Ghana John Dramani Mahama from 2009 to 2017. He monitored and evaluated poverty reduction in the Canadian International Development.

== Early life and education ==
Gariba was born in Northern Ghana. He attended Ghana College, now Ghana Senior High School (GHANASCO), Tamale. He was awarded a bachelor's degree in political science from the University of Ghana in 1981. In 1982, he further had his MA in Political Science and International Relations and also his Ph.D. in Political Science and International Development from Carleton University, Ottawa, Ontario in 1989. In 2014, he was awarded an honorary Doctor of Laws from Carleton University.

== Politics ==
In 2009, he was the Development Policy Advisor in President Mill's administration. He was later appointed the Ambassador of Ghana to Canada. He is claimed to have worked with NPP, NDC and PNC.

== Death ==
He died on 27 April 2021. John Mahama and Lordina Mahama attended his funeral.
