= Ernest Henry Norgbey =

Ghanaian politician

Hon. Ernest Henry Norgbey MP
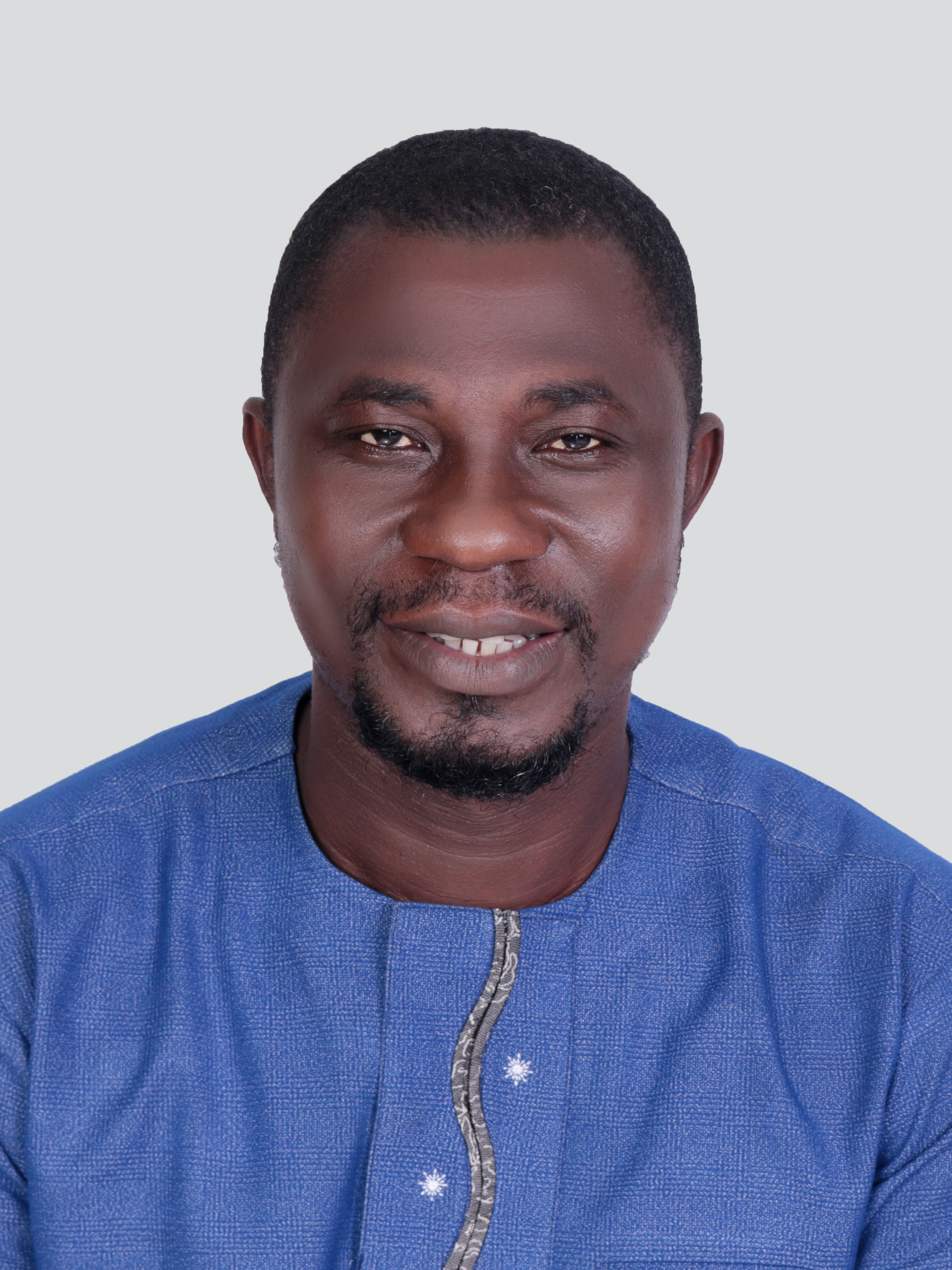

Member of the Ghana Parliament for Ashaiman Constituency
- Incumbent
- Assumed office 2017

Personal details
- Born: 28 December 1980 (age 45) Ho - Ziavi
- Party: National Democratic Congress
- Children: 1
- Education: University of Professional Studies; University of Nottingham; Coventry University

Ernest Henry Norgbey is a Ghanaian politician who has served as Member of Parliament for the Ashaiman constituency in the Greater Accra Region since 2017. He is a member of the National Democratic Congress (NDC).

== Early life and education ==
Norgbey was born in Ho-Ziavi in the Volta Region of Ghana. He studied at the Chartered Institute of Purchasing and Supply, where he received a diploma. He also received a diploma at the International School of Aviation.

In 2003, he graduated with an MSC in Supply Chain Management from Coventry University In 2011, he graduated with a BBA from the University of Professional Studies, Accra. In 2014, he became a chartered member of the Chartered Institute of Purchasing and Supply. In 2015, he acquired a Postgraduate Certificate in Public Procurement Law and Policy at the University of Nottingham, UK.

== Career before politics ==
Norgbey worked as a teacher at Happy Home Basic School in 2006–2009 and later became the procurement officer at the National Disaster Management Organization.

== Politics ==
In 2015, he contested and won the NDC parliamentary primaries for Ashiaman constituency in the Greater Accra Region. He won this parliamentary seat during the 2016 Ghanaian general election.

Before the 2020 elections, he accused the Electoral Commission of Ghana of deliberately removing his and 21,000 others' names from the voters register. Though the commission disputed the claims, Ernerst Norgbey announced after 24 hours that his name along with 14,000 other had been restored into the system.

On Saturday 13 May 2023, Ernest Henry Norgbey contested and won the NDC parliamentary primaries for Ashiaman constituency in the Greater Accra Region with 1,627 votes by beating Tony Afenyo who polled 1,221 votes and David Worwui-Brown who also polled 50 votes.

In Parliament, he has been a member of the Defence and Interior Committee.

== Personal life ==
Norgbey is married with one child. He is a Christian.
