= Samson Asaki Awingobit =

Ghana businessman and politician

- Born: 1979 (age 46–47); Ashaiman, Ghana
- Occupations: Businessman and politician
- Known for: Chairman of People's National Convention

Samson Asaki Awingobit (born in 1979) is a businessman, Ghanaian politician, and is the current National Chairman of the People's National Convention (PNC 2025). He is the current Executive Secretary for Importers and Exporters Association of Ghana (IEAG). Awingobit has been involved in the Ghanaian politics since the year 2008, which he was running for parliamentary and party leadership positions within the PNC. In the year 2024, he was elected as the PNC National Chairman. He has been a vocal commentator on economic and trade issues in Ghana.

== Early years ==
Samson Asaki Awingobit was born in 1979 in the Ashaiman township, Accra, Ghana. He spent his early years living in a small wooden structure with his family in Ashaiman. In 2008, still while he served as a parliamentary candidate, he lived in a kiosk with his wife and son. After working for about 12 years, he built his house and moved in with his family.

== Early career ==
With a background in entrepreneurship and trade, Awingobit is also a businessman. He serves as the Executive Secretary of the Importers and Exporters Association of Ghana (IEAG), this is a position held in various economic discussions. In his role as an Executive Secretary, he advocated for change in interest rates that affects the participation in The African Continental Free Trade Area (AfCFTA), suggesting a reduction to 11% for Ghanaian industries.

In September 2021, Awingobit agreed to the freeze on freight rates by CMA CGM Group, which in effect, affected business costs for shipping companies at Ghana's ports.

He also commented on the Labianca Company exemption case in 2022, stating that the GRA Commissioner-General at the time was aware of the incident. He commented on the effect of credentials of government officials over the economic downturn.

In 2023, Awingobit pledged resistance to any new taxes in the mid-year budget review, speaking on the effect on businesses as a prediction.

In 2024, he commented on the effect of illegal mining (galamsey) on food security, the environment, and exports. He also commented on the blocking of excavator imports to combat illegal mining. Awingobit commented on the issue of smuggled wheat flour which affects local producers.

== Political career ==
=== Early political involvement (2008–2020) ===
Awingobit started his political career as PNC's parliamentary candidate for Ashaiman (Ghana parliament constituency) in 2008. According to some regional executives, he did not participated in party-related activities since then.

In March 2020, at the funeral of the Kusasi Queen Mother, Awingobit commented on the government's US$100 million COVID-19 fund allocation which he related to support for manufacturing locally.

In 2020, he ran for the PNC flagbearership, finishing as the runner-up to David Apasera. According to the publication by Modern Ghana on August 9th 2020, The Greater Accra PNC executives did not work in support of his flagbearership.

=== Flagbearership bids and party leadership (2024) ===
In January 2024, Awingobit declared his intention to contest the PNC flagbearership again.

In August 2024, he joined the contest for PNC National Chairmanship, with nomination forms picked up on August 14. He was elected as the National Chairman on August 31, 2024, with 893 votes.

Following his election, Awingobit urged 60-year-old retirees from the NPP and the NDC to step down for younger leaders.

In December 2024, after PNC's disqualification from elections, he supported John Mahama's post election activities, attributing it to Ghanaians' desire for change. He advised that some individuals be arrested and funds recovered.

In July 2025, as the PNC Chairman, he commented on the inaction by Kusaug MPs following alleged military brutality in Bawku on July 13, demanding justice and stronger representation.
