= Hawa Yakubu =

Ghanaian politician

Hon. Hawa Yakubu Ogede

Member of the Ghana Parliament for Bawku Central
- In office 7 January 2001 – 6 January 2005
- Preceded by: Fati Seidu
- Succeeded by: Mahama Ayariga
- Majority: 874
- In office 7 January 1993 – 6 January 1997
- Preceded by: Constituency merged
- Succeeded by: Fati Seidu

Personal details
- Born: 24 March 1948 Tarkwa, Ghana
- Died: March 20, 2007 (aged 58) London, England
- Party: Independent - 1993–1996; New Patriotic Party - 1996–2007

Hawa Yakubu Ogede (24 March 1948 – 20 March 2007) was a Ghanaian politician. She was a Member of Parliament in the Fourth Republic of Ghana and also served as Minister for Tourism.

== Early life and education ==
Hawa Yakubu was born at Tarkwa in the Western Region of Ghana. She is a native of Pusiga in the Upper East Region. Hawa Yakubu being a member of the Bissa ethnic group, was a founding member of the annual Zekula festival.

Yakubu had her early education at Zebilla Middle School and her secondary education at the Navrongo Secondary School. She had her tertiary education at the Accra Polytechnic (now the Accra Technical University) where she obtained her diploma in Institutional Management.

== Career ==
Prior to entering politics, Yakubu was a |domestic bursar] and a businesswoman. She was a hard working person

== Political career ==
In 1979, Yakubu was elected unopposed to her local council and was the youngest member of the constituent assembly which wrote the constitution of the Ghana's Third Republic. She also served as the Women's Leader for the United National Convention when the party was founded in 1979. Yakubu fled to London and later Nigeria when a military coup occurred in 1981. She lived in voluntary exile until 1991.

In that year, Yakubu returned to Ghana and, in the following year, contested a seat in parliament from the Bawku Central district, which she won despite being an independent candidate. She was elected into the first parliament of the fourth republic of Ghana on 7 January 1993 after she was pronounced winner at the 1992 Ghanaian parliamentary election held on 29 December 1992. She then lost the seat under controversial circumstances and moved to Cotonou, Benin until 2000.

In 2000, she returned to Ghana and won back her seat. In 2001 and 2002, she was appointed to be Minister of Tourism under President John Kufuor. She also served at this time as a Ghanaian representative to the Economic Community of West African States (ECOWAS) parliament. Yakubu lost her parliament seat in 2004.

At the time of her death in 2007, it was reported that she had been suffering from cancer for quite some time and had sought treatment in London and South Africa.

== Death ==
She died in London, England, due to cancer. She is survived by three children, Derek Ayebo from her first marriage and Amanda and Didi Ogede from her second marriage.

Parliament of Ghana
Preceded by ?	Member of Parliament for Bawku Central; 1993 – 1997	Succeeded by Fati Seidu
Preceded by Fati Seidu	Member of Parliament for Bawku Central; 2001 – 2005	Succeeded by Mahama Yariga
Political offices
Preceded by Mike Gizo	Minister for Tourism; 2001 – 2002	Succeeded by Jake Okanka Obetsebi-Lamptey
