= Bright Bakye Yelviel Baligi =

Ghanaian politician

Hon Bright Bakye Yelviel Baligi
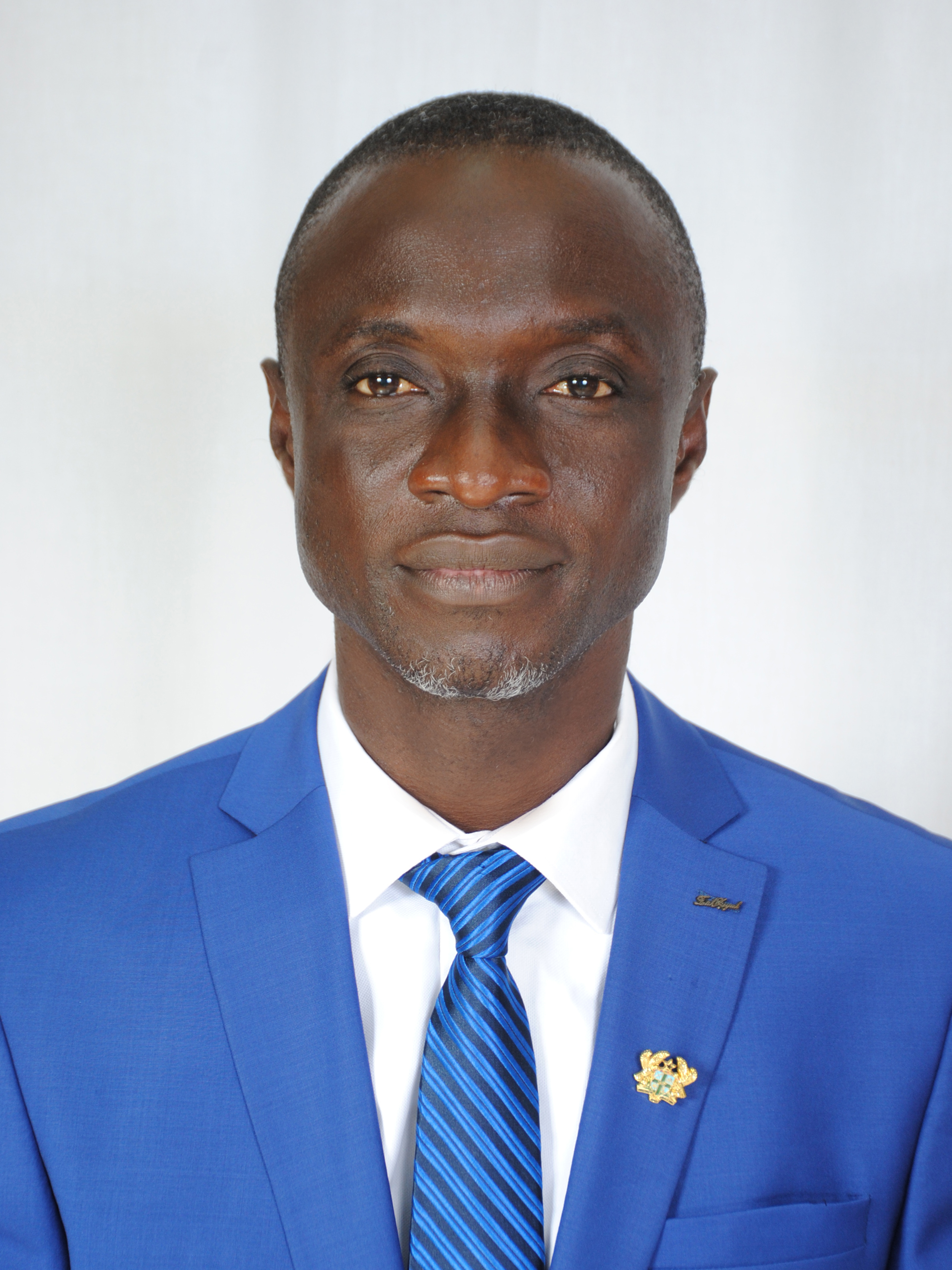

Member of the Ghana Parliament for Lambussie
- Incumbent
- Assumed office 7 January 2021

Personal details
- Born: Anthony Mwinkaara Sumah; 3 May 1977 (age 49) Kpare
- Party: New Patriotic Party
- Occupation: Lecturer
- Committees: House Committee, Constitutional, Legal and Parliamentary Affairs Committee

Bright Bakye Yelviel Baligi (born 3 May 1977) is a Ghanaian politician and member of the New Patriotic Party. He is the member of parliament for the Lambussie Constituency, Upper West Region.

== Early life and education ==
Baligi hails from Kpare. He hold a BSc in Agricultural Technology.

== Personal life ==
Bright Bakye Yelviel Baligi is a Christian
