= Alfred Kwame Agbesi =

Ghanaian politician (1955–2025)

Hon. Alfred Kwame Agbesi

Member of Parliament for Ashaiman Constituency
- In office 7 January 2013 – 6 January 2017
- President: John Mahama
- Succeeded by: Ernest Henry Norgbey

Member of Parliament for Ashaiman Constituency
- In office 7 January 2009 – 6 January 2013
- President: John Atta Mills; John Mahama

Member of Parliament for Adansi Asokwa Constituency
- In office 7 January 2005 – 6 January 2009
- President: John Kufuor
- Preceded by: Emmanuel Kinsford Kwesi Teye

Personal details
- Born: 20 February 1955
- Died: 2 May 2025 (aged 70) Accra, Ghana
- Party: National Democratic Congress
- Education: University of Ghana Ghana School of Law
- Profession: Lawyer

Alfred Kwame Agbesi (20 February 1955 – 2 May 2025) was a Ghanaian lawyer and politician. He belonged to the National Democratic Congress. He was once Member of Parliament for Ashaiman and a Deputy majority leader of Parliament of Ghana under the John Dramani Mahama administration.

== Early life and education ==
Alfred Kwame Agbesi was born on 20 February 1955. He hailed from Agave-Afedume in British Togoland (now in the Volta Region of Ghana). He was educated in Ghana. He held Bachelor of Laws degree from the University of Ghana, Legon in 1979 and BL (GSL) 1981.

== Career ==
Agbesi worked with the judicial service of Ghana as a lawyer before he became a member of parliament for Ashaiman. He was thus a lawyer and Ghanaian politician by profession.

== Political career ==
Alfred Agbesi was the member of Ghana's parliament for Ashaiman Constituency from 2005 up till 2016 when he lost to the current member of Parliament for the Ashaiman constituency Ernest Norgbey in the Primaries of the National Democratic Congress in 2015.

After being elected in 2008 he was chosen as a member of Ghana delegation to the ECOWAS Parliament in Abuja, Nigeria in 2009 and again in 2013 to represent Ghana.

=== 2004 elections ===
Agbesi was elected as the member of parliament for the Ashaiman Constituency for the first time in the 2004 Ghanaian general elections. He was elected with 53,559 votes out of 94,091 total valid votes cast. This was equivalent to 56.9% of the total valid votes cast. He was elected over Hajia Hajara M. Ali of the People's National Convention, Teye Emmanauel Kinsford Kwesi of the New Patriotic Party, Phoyon Isaac Bruce Mensah of the Convention People's Party and Amable Kwame Samuel an independent candidate. These obtained 2.9%, 38.3%, 0.9% and 1.0% respectively of the total valid votes cast. Agbesi was elected on the ticket of the National Democratic Congress. His constituency was a part of the 10 constituencies won by the National Democratic Congress in the Greater Accra region in that elections. In all, the National Democratic Congress won a total 94 parliamentary seats in the 4th parliament of the 4th republic of Ghana.

== Personal life and death ==
Agbesi was married with six children. He was a Christian. Agbesi died at the 37 Military Hospital in Accra, on 2 May 2025, at the age of 70.
