= Alice Teni Boon =

Ghanaian politician

Honourable Alice Teni Boon

Member of the Ghana Parliament for Lambussie
- In office 9 June 1999 – 6 January 2009
- Preceded by: Luke Koo
- Succeeded by: John Duoghr Baloroo

Personal details
- Born: 12 January 1962 (age 64)
- Party: National Democratic Congress
- Spouse: Jacob Bawline Boon
- Education: University of Ghana; University of Westminster; Ghana Institute of Journalism; Pitman Central College London
- Profession: Communications consultant, politician
- Committees: Finance Committee & Mines and Energy Committee(7th Parliament of 4th Republic of Ghana)

Alice Teni Boon is a Ghanaian politician who served as the member of parliament for the Lambussie constituency from 1999 to 2009.

== Early life and education ==
Boon was born on 12 January 1962 and hails from Lambussie in the Upper West Region of Ghana. She attended the University of Ghana and the University of Westminster. She also attended the Ghana Institute of Journalism and Pitman Central College in London.

From these she obtained a Master's in Business Administration and a Master of Arts in Public Communication. Her academic major was in Communication.

== Career ==
Boon is an expert in communication as well as a consultant by profession. She is also a politician with the National Democratic Congress, a Ghanaian political party.

== Politics ==
Alice entered parliament on the ticket of the National Democratic Congress (NDC) on Tuesday 8 June 1999 when she won the by-election on 26 May 1999 following the death of Luke Koo, the then member of parliament for the constituency.

She subsequently won the seat during the December 2000 general election and the December 2004 general election. She however lost the seat to John Duoghr Baloroo of the New Patriotic Party (NPP) in the December 2008 general election. During the December 2012 general election, she was replaced by Edward K. Dery who consequently won the seat for the NDC.

=== 2000 Elections ===
Boon was elected as the member of parliament for the Lambussie constituency in the Upper West region of Ghana in the 2000 Ghanaian general elections. She therefore represented the constituency in the 4th parliament of the 4th republic of Ghana.

She was elected with 7,076 out of the total votes cast. This is equivalent to 60.80% of the total valid votes cast. She was elected over David Mwinfor Deribaa an independent candidate, Kabiri Nmin of the National Reform Party, Ampulling Nicholas of the New Patriotic Party and Bamie Mubashir Ahmed of the United Ghana Movement Party. These obtained 2,472 votes, 1,272 votes, 441 votes, 375 votes and 0 votes respectively.

These were equivalent to 60.80%, 21.20%, 10.90%, 3.80%, 3.20% and 0.00% respectively of the total valid votes cast. Boon was elected on the ticket of the National Democratic Congress. The National Democratic Congress won a total of 7 parliamentary seats in the Upper West Region in that elections.

In all, the party won a minority total of 89 parliamentary representation out of 200 seats in the 3rd parliament of the 4th republic of Ghana.

=== 2004 Elections ===
Boon was elected as the member of parliament for the Lambussie constituency in the 2004 Ghanaian general elections. She therefore represented the constituency in the 4th parliament of the 4th republic of Ghana. She was elected with 6,554 votes out of 12,480 total valid votes cast. This was equivalent to 52.5% of the total valid votes cast.

She was elected over Thomas F. Bitie-Ketting of the People's National Convention, Sebastian Koug Bamile of the New Patriotic Party and Abubakari Alhaji Yahaya of the Convention People's Party.

These obtained 1,265 votes, 4,553 votes and 108 votes respectively of the total valid votes cast. These were equivalent to 10.1%, 36.5% and 0.9% respectively of the total valid votes cast. Boon was elected on the ticket of the National Democratic Congress.

The National Democratic Congress obtained 7 parliamentary seats in that election in the Upper West region of Ghana.

== Personal life ==
Boon is a Christian. She is married to Jacob Bawiine Boon, a lawyer and a former member of parliament for the Lambussie constituency and also a former District Chief Executive of the Jirapa/Lambussie District.

== See also ==
- 1999 by-election
- List of MPs elected in the 2000 Ghanaian parliamentary election
- List of MPs elected in the 2004 Ghanaian parliamentary election
- Lambussie (Ghana parliament constituency)
