= Titus Kofi Beyuo =

Ghanaian politician

Hon. Titus Kofi Beyuo

Member of Parliament for Lambussie
- Incumbent
- Assumed office 7 January 2025

Personal details
- Born: September 14, 1981 (age 44) Ghana
- Party: National Democratic Congress
- Education: University of Ghana; GIMPA; University of Utrecht
- Profession: Medical doctor, Politician

Titus Kofi Beyuo (born 14 September 1981) is a Ghanaian politician and member of the 9th Parliament of the 4th Republic of Ghana representing Lambussie under the flagship of the National Democratic Congress.

== Early years and Education ==
Titus attended his secondary school at Pope John Secondary School and Minor Seminary in 2000. He had his first degree in Bachelor of Science from University of Ghana in the year 2005. In 2009, he attained his Bachelor of Medicine and Science in the same University. He had his Master of Philosophy from the same university in 2013. In 2018, he had a certificate from the Ghana Institute of Public Administration and Management (GIMPA). Furthermore, he attained membership (MGCS) from Ghana College of Physicians and Surgeons in 2015. He also attained a fellowship (FGCS) from West African College of Surgeons in 2018. He then obtained his Doctor of Philosophy at the University of Utrecht, Netherlands, in the year 2022.

== Personal life ==
His hometown is Kucha and he is a Christian by religion.
