= Bawku Central (Ghana parliament constituency) =

- constituency for the Parliament of Ghana
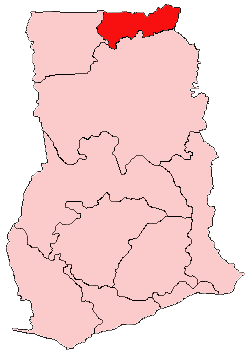
- District: Bawku Municipal District
- Region: Upper East Region of Ghana

Current constituency
- Party: National Democratic Congress
- MP: Mahama Ayariga

Bawku Central is one of the constituencies represented in the Parliament of Ghana. It elects one Member of Parliament (MP) by the first past the post system of election. Bawku Central is located in the Bawku Municipal district of the Upper East Region of Ghana.

== Boundaries ==
The seat is located within the Bawku Municipal District in the Upper East Region of Ghana. Prior to the 2004 parliamentary election, the Pusiga constituency was carved out of the pre-existing Bawku Central constituency in what was then known as the Bawku East District. The current constituency is thus smaller in area than that preceding the 2004 election.

== Members of Parliament ==
The current MP is Mahama Ayariga who was elected in the December 2020 elections. Ayariga was the member of Ghana's parliament for the Bawku Central constituency from 2005 but lost his seat in the 2008 Elections to Adamu Dramani Sakande of the NPP. The seat became vacant when Adamu was convicted and jailed by a court for having stood for the election while being the citizen of another country which is against the Ghana constitution. Ayariga recaptured the seat in the 2012 General Elections. He has been elected as the member of parliament for this constituency in the fourth, sixth, seventh and eighth parliament of the fourth Republic of Ghana.

Adamu Dramani Sakande was jailed for 2 years by the Supreme Court of Ghana for forgery on 27 July 2012. This follows a case brought in the High court by Mr Sumaila Biebel, a cattle dealer in 2009 stating that Dramani did not qualify to be an MP as he held both a British and a Burkinabé passport.

First elected	Member	Party
1992	Hawa Yakubu	Independent
1996	Fati Seidu	National Democratic Congress
2000	Hawa Yakubu	New Patriotic Party
2004	Mahama Ayariga	National Democratic Congress
2008	Adamu Daramani Sakande	New Patriotic Party
2012	Mahama Ayariga	National Democratic Congress

== Elections ==
2008 Ghanaian parliamentary election: Bawku Central Source:Ghana Home Page
Party	Candidate	Votes	%	±%
New Patriotic Party	Adamu Daramani	20,157	53.4	26.7
National Democratic Congress	Mahama Ayariga	17,385	46.1	−2.5
Democratic Freedom Party	Alhaji Imoro Yaro-N-Kano	71	0.2	—
People's National Convention	Amidu Alhaji Mamudu Sisala	54	0.1	−0.8
Convention People's Party	Rodalin Imoru Ayarna	52	0.1	−0.8
Majority		2,772	7.3	−14.6
Turnout				—

2004 Ghanaian parliamentary election: Bawku Central Source:National Electoral Commission, Ghana
Party	Candidate	Votes	%	±%
National Democratic Congress	Mahama Ayariga	18,518	48.6	+1.9
New Patriotic Party	Hawa Yakubu	10,169	26.7	−21.9
Independent	Abubakar Ustarz	8,574	22.5	—
Convention People's Party	Tiaban Kunduma	353	0.9	−0.1
People's National Convention	Amidu Mamadu	333	0.9	−1.8
Independent	Sadat Amadu	161	0.4	—
Majority		8,349	21.9	+20.0
Turnout		38,405	77.3	—

2000 Ghanaian parliamentary election: Bawku Central Source:Adam Carr's Election Archives
Party	Candidate	Votes	%	±%
New Patriotic Party	Hawa Yakubu	22,335	48.6	—
National Democratic Congress	Fati Seidu	21,461	46.7	—
People's National Convention	Abdul K Yussif	1,239	2.7	—
United Ghana Movement	Hadi Melayia	505	1.1	—
Convention People's Party	Yakubu S Kundiima	451	1.0	—
Majority		874	1.9	—

== See also ==
- List of Ghana Parliament constituencies
