= Edward Mahama =

Ghanaian gynaecologist and politician

Edward Nasigrie Mahama

Leader of the PNC
- In office 2016–2020
- Preceded by: Dr. Hassan Ayariga

Personal details
- Born: April 15, 1945 (age 81) Sumniboma, Ghana
- Party: People's National Convention
- Education: University of Ghana
- Occupation: Gynaecologist

Edward Nasigrie Mahama (born 15 April 1945) is a Ghanaian medical doctor and politician. He was a perennial presidential candidate of the People's National Convention, contesting in the 1996, 2000, 2004, 2008 and 2016 General Elections.

== Early life and education ==
Born in the village of Sumniboma (northern Ghana) in 1945, Mahama attended Nalerigu Primary and Middle School from 1953 to 1959. He then attended Secondary School in Tamale from 1961 to 1965. Later that year, he was admitted to the University of Ghana in Legon and graduated in 1972 with a medical degree.

== Medicine ==
Mahama went back to Nalerigu as a medical doctor in September 1973 and four years later, he left Ghana to become an Obstetrics and Gynecology Physician in Chicago, Illinois. During this period, he was also a Clinical Instructor at Northwestern University. In 1990, Mahama was appointed a lecturer at the University of Ghana Medical School and consultant at the Korle Bu Teaching Hospital in Accra. He was elected a fellow of the West African College of Surgeons in 1994.

== Politics ==
In 1996, running as the presidential candidate of the People's National Convention (PNC), he received 3.0% of the vote. In his second attempt at the presidency, in 2000, he won 2.5% of the vote.

In preparation for the 2004 presidential election, the PNC and two other parties – Every Ghanaian Living Everywhere (EGLE) and the Great Consolidated Popular Party (GCPP) – formed an alliance known as the Grand Coalition and chose Mahama as its presidential candidate. He placed third out of four candidates, winning 1.9% of the vote.

Mahama was elected as the candidate for the PNC for the December 7, 2008 presidential elections.

Edward Mahama lost the position of presidential candidate of the PNC to Hassan Ayariga in the run up to the 2012 general election. However, he won the position back from Ayariga for the 2016 election. After the defeat, Ayariga left the PNC to form another party, the All People's Congress (APC).

Edward Mahama is currently Ghana's Ambassador-at-Large.

== Family ==
Mahama is married and the father of four children.

Party political offices
Preceded by Hilla Limann	People's National Convention presidential candidate 1996, 2000, 2004, 2008	Succeeded by Hassan Ayariga
Preceded by Hassan Ayariga	People's National Convention presidential candidate 2016	Succeeded by David Apasera
