= Jacob Iddriss Abdulai =

Ghanaian politician

Hon Jacob Iddriss Abdulai
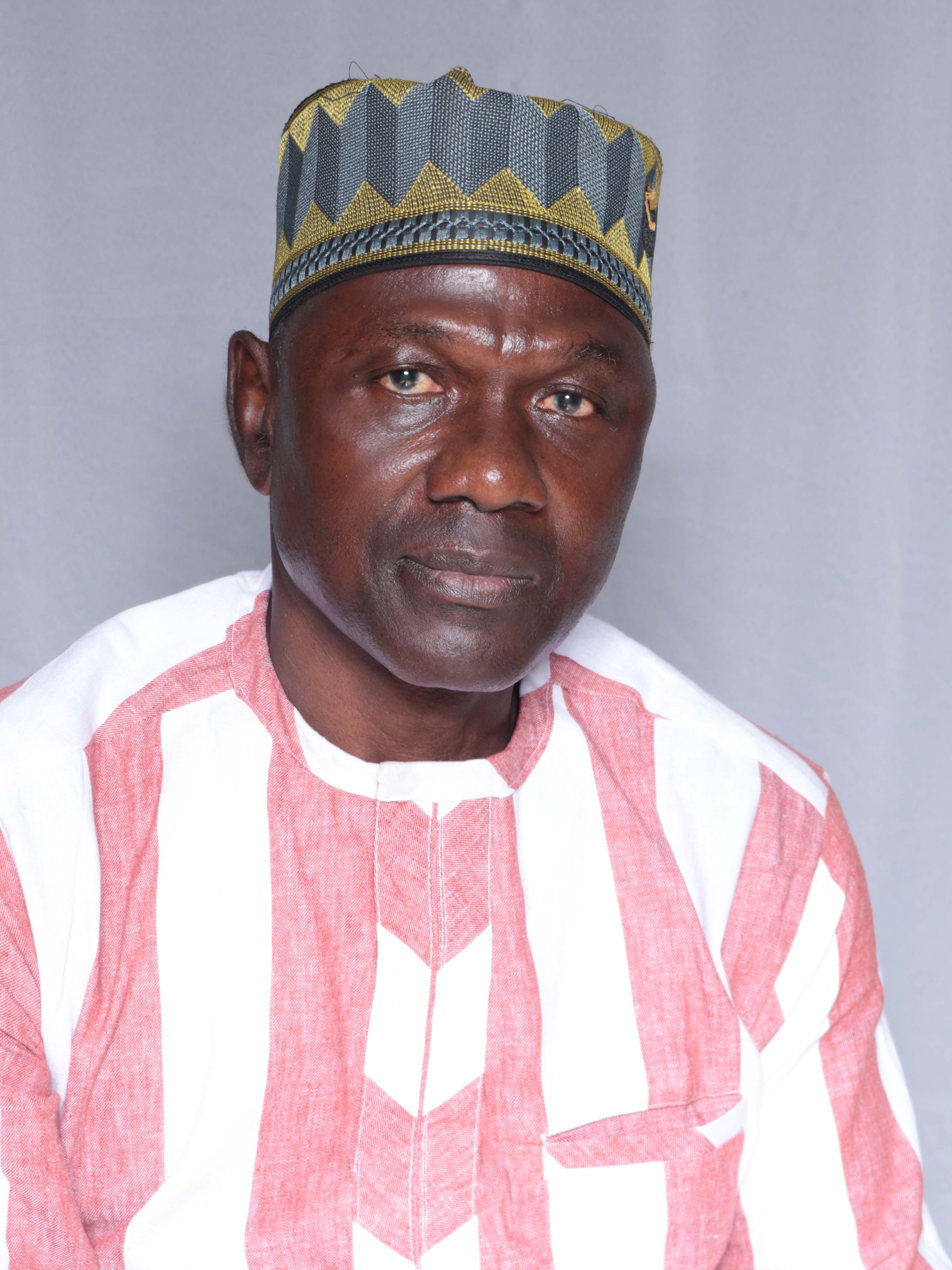

Member of the Ghana Parliament for Savelegu Constituency
- Incumbent
- Assumed office 7 January 2021

Personal details
- Born: Jacob Iddriss Abdulai; 24 February 1957 (age 69) Savelugu
- Party: National Democratic Congress
- Occupation: Politician
- Committees: Government Assurance Committee, Roads and Transport Committee

Jacob Iddriss Abdulai (born 24 February 1957) is a Ghanaian politician and member of the National Democratic Congress. He is the member of parliament for Savelugu Constituency, Northern Region.

== Early life and education ==
Jacob was born on February 24, 1957, and hails from Savelugu. He holds a Survey School Cert, Diploma In Geodetic Engineering, Bsc. Geodetic Engineering and Msc. Road And Transportation Engineering. He has previously worked as an Engineer with the Ghana Highways Authority.

== Politics ==
In 2016 election, Jacob contested as parliamentary candidate on the ticket of the National Democratic Congress for the Savelugu Constituency and lost to the New Patriotic Party's Abdul Samed Muhammed Gunu. He staged a comeback in the 2020 election and this time, he won by slim margin against the incumbent MP and opponent in the previous elections. He won that election by obtaining 19,577 of the total votes while his main opponent and candidate for the NPP got 19,478 votes.

Jacob's opponent alleged election malpractices and challenged the results in law court, but in December 2023, the Tamale High Court upheld his victory as it threw out the petition challenging his election.

Jacob is a member of two committees of the Parliament of Ghana, the Government Assurances and Roads and Transport Committees.

== Personal life ==
Jacob is a Muslim.
