= All People's Congress (Ghana) =

Political party in Ghana

- Logo of the All People's Congress
- Abbreviation: APC
- Leader: Hassan Ayariga
- Chairperson: Hassan Ayariga
- General Secretary: Kweku Frimpong
- Vice Presidential Candidate: Emmanuel Bartels
- Founder: Hassan Ayariga
- Founded: 24 January 2016
- Split from: People's National Convention
- Headquarters: Kwabenya, Accra
- Colours: Green, White, Yellow
- Slogan: All Inclusive Governance
- Parliament: 0 / 275

Election symbol
- Broom

The All People's Congress is a Ghanaian political party formed as a breakaway from the People's National Convention (PNC).

== History ==
It was founded in 2016 by Hassan Ayariga after leaving the People's National Convention, where he lost out to Edward Mahama as the presidential candidate for the December 2016 general election. The party's focus for the election campaign was employment and economics.

== Disqualification ==
Two months before the 2016 Ghanaian general election, Charlotte Osei, chairman of the Electoral Commission of Ghana announced that 13 presidential candidates, including Hassan Ayariga, had been disqualified from standing as presidential candidates in the December elections due to problems with the nomination documents they filed with the commission. These included failure to declare his hometown or constituency of residence on his forms as well as two of the subscribers on his forms having been named on another candidates forms which are in contravention of the electoral laws. The forms were also alleged to contain forged signatures and were to be referred to the Ghana Police Service for investigation. The subscriber duplication involved someone who had also signed papers for his former party, the APC's nominee. Ayariga expressed his frustration at this development.

== Election results ==
=== Presidential elections ===
Election	Candidate	First round		Second round		Result
Election	Candidate	Votes	%	Votes	%	Result
2020	Hassan Ayariga	7,138	0.05%	—		Lost ✗
2024	Hassan Ayariga	17,938	0.15%	—		Lost ✗

=== Parliamentary elections ===
Election	Votes	%	Seats	+/–	Position	Government
2016	2,527	0.02%	0 / 275	New	7th	Extra-parliamentary
2020	1,214	0.01%	0 / 275	0	▼11th	Extra-parliamentary
2024	1,946	0.02%	0 / 276	0	▲10th	Extra-parliamentary

== See also ==
- List of political parties in Ghana
