= Gabby Nsiah Nketiah =

Ghanaian businessman and politician

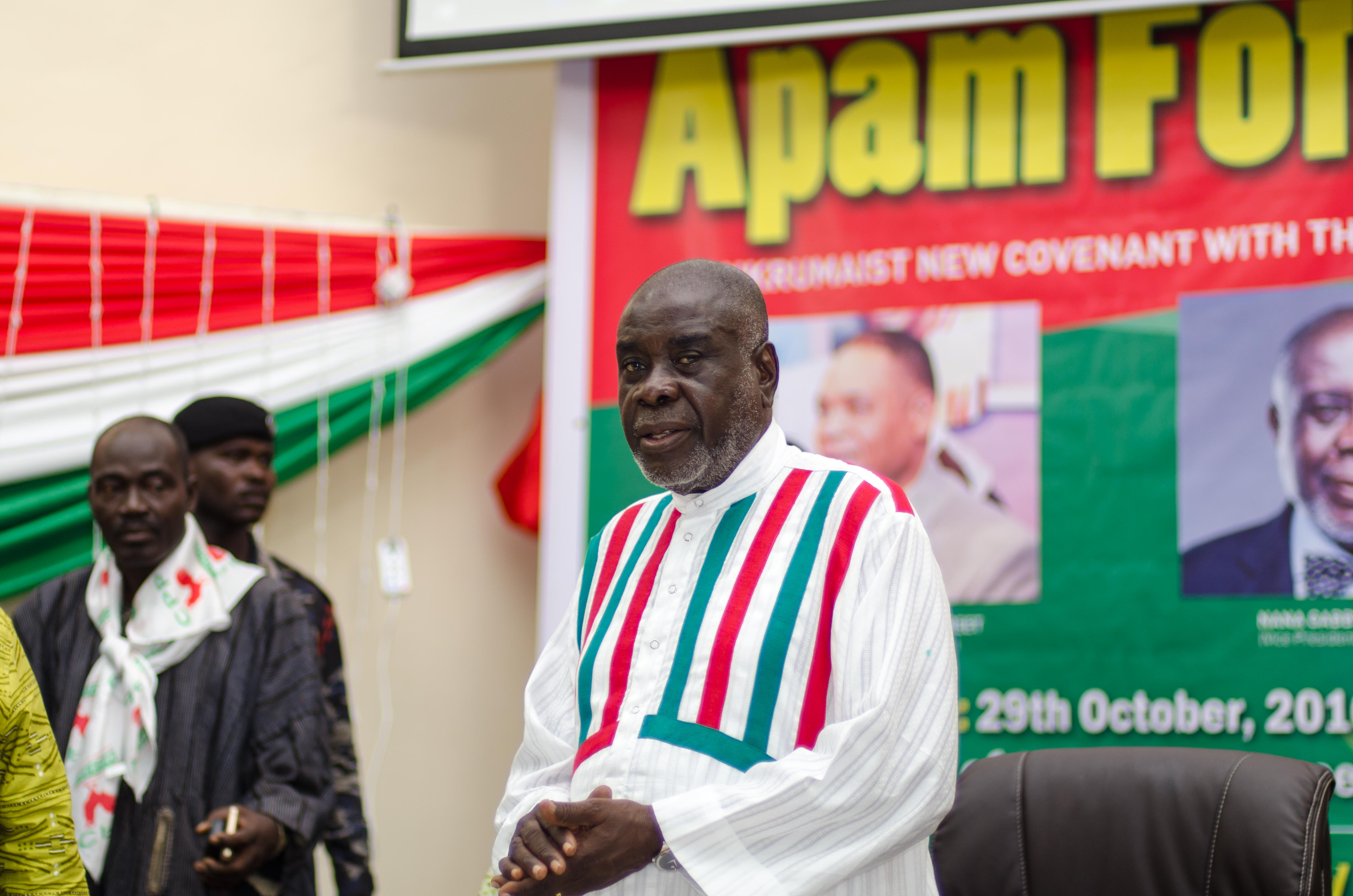
Vice presidential running mate for the Convention People's Party in the 2016 Elections in Ghana

Gabby Nsiah Nketiah (born 1 October 1943) is a Ghanaian businessman, diplomat, musician and politician. He was the vice-presidential candidate for the Convention People's Party in the 2016 general elections in Ghana.

== Personal life ==
He is married to Monica Nsiah Nketiah, and their children are David Adomako, Indira Nsiah Nketiah, Cleopatra Nsiah Nketiah, Gabriel Nsiah Nketiah and Kirpal Nsiah Nketiah.

== Music career ==
In the early 1960s, while serving in the Ghana Armed Forces (GAF), Nketiah pioneered the formation of the "Avengers" band. This initiative sparked a trend, leading to the establishment of dance bands across various army units, significantly impacting the military's cultural landscape.

== Death ==
Nketiah died at the Korle Bu Teaching Hospital on Saturday June 22, 2024, after a short illness.
