= Ashaiman (Ghana parliament constituency) =

Ghana parliament constituency

- constituency for the Parliament of Ghana
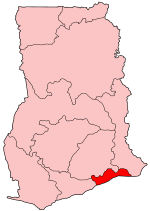
- District: Ashaiman Municipal
- Region: Greater Accra Region of Ghana

Current constituency
- Party: National Democratic Congress
- MP: Ernest Henry Norgbey

Ashaiman is one of the constituencies represented in the Parliament of Ghana. It elects one Member of Parliament (MP) by the first past the post system of election. Ernest Henry Norgbey is the member of parliament for the constituency. The Ashaiman constituency is located in the Tema Municipal District of the Greater Accra Region of Ghana.

== Boundaries ==
The seat is located entirely within the Accra Metropolitan Area of the Greater Accra Region of Ghana.

== Members of Parliament ==
Election	Member	Party
1992	Franklin Winfred K Aheto	National Democratic Congress
2000	Emmanuel Kinsford Kwesi Teye	New Patriotic Party
2004	Alfred Kwame Agbesi	National Democratic Congress

== Elections ==
2008 Ghanaian parliamentary election: Ashaiman Sources:Ghana Home Page
Party	Candidate	Votes	%	±%
National Democratic Congress	Alfred Kwame Agbesi	51,556	60.3	0.4
New Patriotic Party	Francis Bernard Anyinatoe	32,613	38.2	−0.1
People's National Convention	Samson Asaki Awingobit	558	0.7	−2.2
Convention People's Party	Phoyon Isaac Bruce-Mensah	534	0.6	−0.3
Democratic Freedom Party	John Apedo	198	0.2	—
Majority		18,943	22.1	3.5
Turnout				—

2004 Ghanaian parliamentary election: Ashaiman Sources:Electoral Commission of Ghana
Party	Candidate	Votes	%	±%
National Democratic Congress	Alfred Kwame Agbesi	53,559	56.9	—
New Patriotic Party	Emmanuel Kinsford Kwesi Teye	36,044	38.3	—
People's National Convention	Hajara M. Ali Hajia	2,687	2.9	—
Independent	Samuel Kwame Amable	966	1.0	—
Convention People's Party	Phoyon Isaac Bruce-Mensah	835	0.9	—
Majority		17,515	18.6	—
Turnout				—

== See also ==
- List of Ghana Parliament constituencies
