= Savannah Accelerated Development Authority =

Agency overview
- Type: Government
- Parent department: Ministry of Food and Agriculture
- Website: Official website

Savannah Accelerated Development Authority (SADA) is a Government of Ghana agency responsible for coordinating a comprehensive development agenda for the savanna ecological zones comprising the three northernmost regions and stretches of Brong Ahafo and Volta Regions that are contiguous to the Northern region of Ghana. Its mandate is to assist in the development of agriculture and industry in the region to help lessen the disparity between its development and that found elsewhere in the country.

== Description ==
Savannah Accelerated Development Authority was established by an Act of Parliament; SADA Act 805 on 17 September 2010 with its first chief executive officer appointed in October 2011. It has a 5-year Business Plan which begun in 2012 and will end in 2016. Its office and staffing of directors and coordinators began work in March 2013.

SADA will institute projects, programs and policies aimed at stimulating growth and addressing the human and social development needs of the target area. In the 2008 budget, the Government of Ghana mandated the preparation of a long-term strategy to reverse decades of neglect of the northern part of Ghana and to set the pace for sustainable development.

== See also ==
- Ministry of Food and Agriculture
