= Edward Kaale-Ewola Dery =

Ghanaian politician (born 1969)

Edward Kaale-Ewola Dery (born 6 March 1969) is a Ghanaian politician and member of the Seventh Parliament of the Fourth Republic of Ghana representing the Lambussie constituency in the Upper West Region, on the ticket of the National Democratic Congress.

== Early life ==
Dery was born on 6 March 1969. He hails from Kpare in the Upper West region of Ghana.

== Education ==
Dery earned a diploma from University of Professional Studies. He also graduated as a Certified Information Systems Auditor in 2012 in the United States.

== Politics ==
Dery is a member of National Democratic Congress and a member of the Seventh Parliament of the Fourth Republic of Ghana representing the Lambussie constituency in the Upper West Region of Ghana.

=== 2016 election ===
Dery contested the Lambussie constituency parliamentary seat on the ticket of the National Democratic Congress during the 2016 Ghanaian general election and won the election with 8,931 votes representing 58.29% of the total votes. He was elected over Bakye Yelviel-Dong Baligi of the New Patriotic Party, Ernest Sanyare Beinpuo (IND), Mwinfor David Deribaa of the Convention People's Party and Tawiah Kaapeke of the APC. They obtained 6,110 votes, 128 votes, 101 votes and 51 votes respectively, equivalent to 39.88%, 0.84%, 0.66% and 0.33% of the total votes respectively.

==== 2020 election ====
Dery again contested the Lambussie constituency parliamentary seat on the ticket of the National Democratic Congress during the 2020 Ghanaian general election but lost the election to Bakye Yelviel-Dong Baligi of the New Patriotic Party.

== Personal life ==
Dery is a Christian. He is married, with two children.

== Employment ==
- Audit Manager, Joseph Odame and Partners Consult Limited, Accra
- Member of Parliament (7 January 2013–present; 2nd term)
