= Administrative divisions of Ghana =

Divisions of Ghana

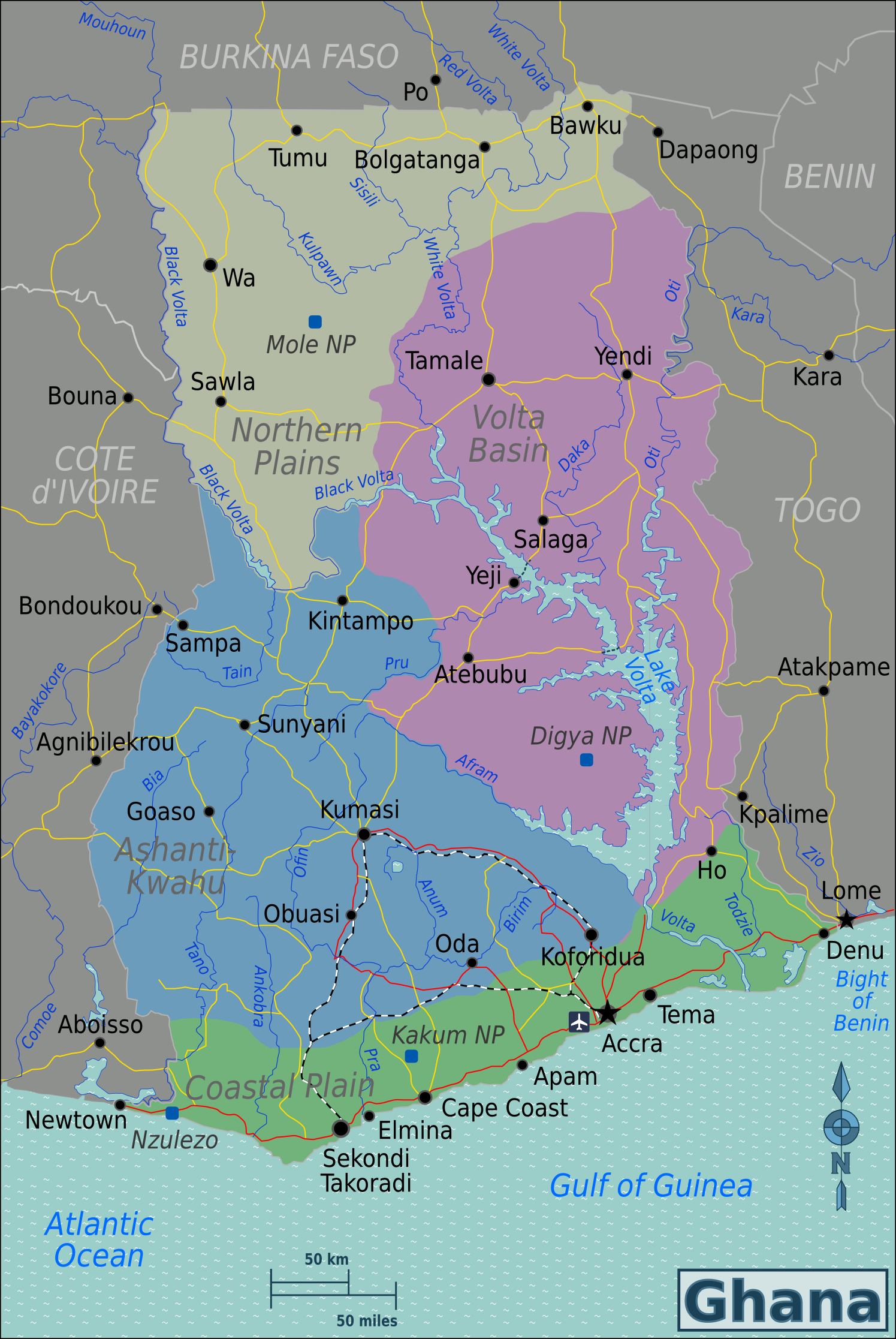
Geographic terrestrial plains of Ghana

The administrative divisions of the Republic of Ghana consist of four geographic terrestrial plains and 16 regions. For local government, there are a total of 261 districts including 146 ordinary districts, 109 municipal districts, and six metropolitan districts.

Various types of councils exist below the district level including 58 town or area councils, 108 zonal councils, and 626 area councils. At a smaller level of local administration, there are over 16,000 unit committees; with each of them containing numerous populated places (i.e.: villages, localities, settlements, communities, etc.).

Electorally, Ghana is divided into 275 constituencies.

== Regions ==
Regions of Ghana from February 2019

Region	Capital
Ahafo	Goaso
Ashanti	Kumasi
Bono	Sunyani
Bono East	Techiman
Central	Cape Coast
Eastern	Koforidua
Greater Accra	Accra
North East	Nalerigu
Northern	Tamale
Oti	Dambai
Savannah	Damongo
Upper East	Bolgatanga
Upper West	Wa
Volta	Ho
Western	Sekondi-Takoradi
Western North	Sefwi Wiawso

== Districts ==
As of 2021, there are 261 metropolitan, municipal and district assemblies (or M.M.D.A.'s) in Ghana; which includes the following population requirements for each type: Ordinary district assemblies must have a population of less than 75,000, while municipal district assemblies must have a population between 75,000 and 95,000, and metropolitan district assemblies must have a population of above 250,000.

== See also ==
- Government of Ghana
