= Mahama Ayariga =

Ghanaian lawyer and politician

Hon. Mahama Ayariga
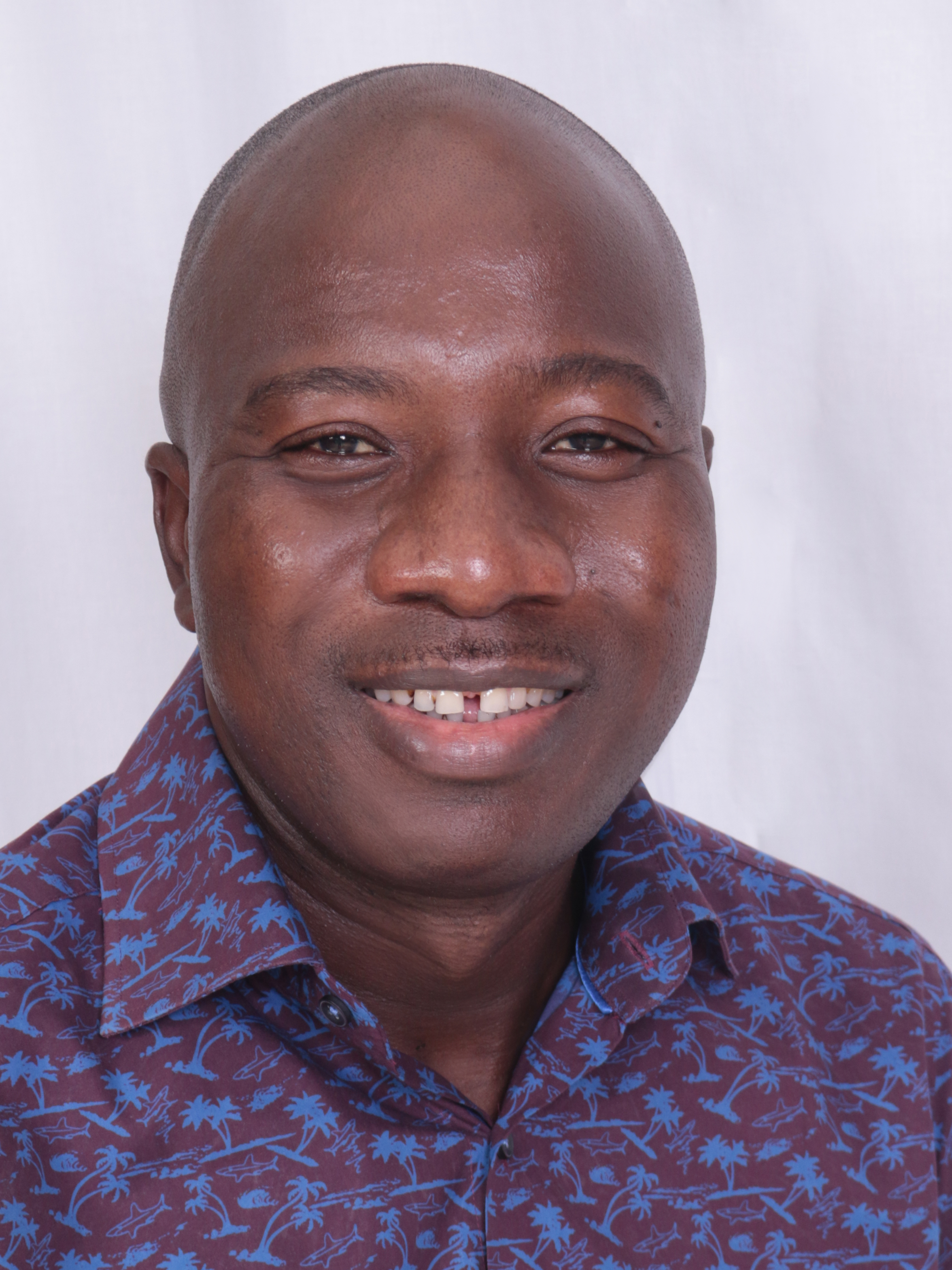

Member of Parliament for Bawku
- Incumbent
- Assumed office 7 January 2013

Minister of Environment, Science, Technology and Innovation
- In office 16 March 2015 – 7 January 2017
- President: John Dramani Mahama
- Succeeded by: Prof. Kwabena Frimpong-Boateng

Minister for Youth and Sports
- In office 16 July 2014 – 14 March 2015
- President: John Dramani Mahama
- Succeeded by: Mustapha Ahmed

Minister for Information
- In office 30 January 2013 – 16 July 2014
- President: John Dramani Mahama
- Succeeded by: (merged with Minister for Communications from 16 July 2014) Edward Omane Boamah

Deputy Minister of Education
- In office 16 February 2011 – 7 January 2013
- President: John Evans Atta Mills; John Dramani Mahama

Deputy Minister of Trade and Industry
- In office 2010–2011
- President: John Evans Atta Mills

Member of Parliament for Bawku
- In office 7 January 2005 – 6 January 2009

Personal details
- Born: 12 May 1974 (age 52) Bawku, Ghana
- Party: National Democratic Congress
- Relations: Frank Abdulai Ayariga (father); Hassan Ayariga (brother)
- Education: University of Ghana; Harvard Law School
- Profession: Lawyer
- Committees: Constitutional, Legal and Parliamentary Affairs Committee, Environment, Science and Technology Committee, Appointments Committee

Mahama Ayariga (born 12 May 1974) is a lawyer and politician in Ghana. He belongs to the National Democratic Congress. He was the Minister of Information and Media Relations and the Minister of Youth and Sports under the John Dramani Mahama administration. He is currently the Member of Parliament representing Bawku Central constituency of the Upper East Region of Ghana in the 4th, 6th, 7th and 8th Parliament of the 4th Republic of Ghana. He is the current majority leader in the parliament of Ghana.

== Early life and education ==
Mahama Ayariga was born on 12 May 1974 in Bawku in the Upper East Region of Ghana. He was educated in Ghana and Nigeria and the United States of America. He attended the Barewa College in Zaria in Kaduna State, Nigeria. He holds a Master of Law (LLM) degree from the Harvard Law School in the United States of America and a Bachelor of Law (LLB) Degree from University of Ghana, Legon. He was the executive director of Legal Resource Centre in Accra.

Ayariga's older brother Hassan Ayariga was the presidential candidate of the People's National Convention (Ghana) for the 2012 General Elections in Ghana.

== Career ==
Ayariga is a lawyer by profession. He started his career as a teaching assistant in natural resources law and international law at the Faculty of Law, University of Ghana. He also co-founded and was the executive director of the Legal Resources Centre, an organization aimed at promoting human rights, community development and social justice.

== Political career ==
=== Member of Parliament ===
Ayariga was the member of Ghana's parliament for the Bawku Central constituency from 2005 but lost his seat in the 2008 Elections to Adamu Dramani Sakande of the NPP. The seat became vacant when Adamu was convicted and jailed by a court for having stood for the election while being the citizen of another country which is against the Ghana constitution. Ayariga recaptured the seat in the 2012 General Elections. He has been elected as the member of parliament for this constituency in the fourth, sixth and seventh parliament of the fourth Republic of Ghana.

=== Minister of state ===
In 2009, when Prof John Evans Atta Mills won the elections, Ayariga became the Presidential Spokesman before he was subsequently appointed Deputy Minister of Trade and Industry. He was subsequently appointed Deputy Minister of Education. Mahama Ayariga was nominated for appointment as Minister for Information by President John Dramani Mahama in January 2013. Mahama Ayariga serves on the Appointments Committee of the Parliament of Ghana.

== Elections ==
Ayariga was elected as the Member of Parliament for Bawku constituency of the Upper East Region of Ghana in the 2004 Ghanaian general elections. He won on the ticket of the National Democratic Congress. His constituency was a part of the 9 parliamentary seats out of 13 seats won by the National Democratic Congress in that election for the Upper East Region. The National Democratic Congress won a minority total of 94 parliamentary seats out of 230 seats. He was elected with 18,518 votes out of 38,108 total valid votes cast. This was equivalent to 48.6% of total valid votes cast. He was elected over Amidu Mamudu Sisala of the Peoples’ National Convention, Hawa Yakubu of the New Patriotic Party, Yussif Taiban Kundima of the Convention People's Party, Sadat Amadu and Abubakar Jibreel Ustarz both independent candidates. These obtained 333, 10,169, 353, 161 and 8,574 votes respectively of total votes cast. These were equivalent to 0.9%, 26.7%, 0.9%, 0.4% and 22.5% respectively of total valid votes cast.

In 2012, he was elected as the member of parliament for the same constituency. He won on the ticket of the National Democratic Congress. He was elected with 24,071 votes out of 43,876 total valid votes cast. This was equivalent to 54.86% of total valid votes cast. He was elected over Awuni Aguuda Joseph of the Peoples’ National Convention, Alhassan Haruna of the New Patriotic Party, Iddrisu Mubarak of the Progressive People's Party and Ibrahim Zaliya of the Convention People's Party. These obtained 303, 19,082, 269 and 151 votes respectively of total votes cast. These were equivalent to 0.69%, 43.49%, 0.61% and 0.34% respectively of total valid votes cast.

== Controversy ==
He accused Hon. Boakye Agyarko, a nominee for the Energy Ministry of paying the minority caucus on the committee bribes for his approval. An AD-HOC committee set up by the speaker investigated and submitted its report to parliament on 29 March 2017. The report claims Mahama Ayariga could not substantiate his accusation against Mr. Agyarko and therefore should unconditionally render apology to the house. In 2019, there have been controversies about him facing a court trial as it is perceived he has done some wrong to be litigated in the High Court though there has been some resistance, the Speaker of Parliament, Prof. Aaron Michael Oquaye on 4 June 2019, ruled that, the Member of Parliament for Bawku Central, Mahama Ayariga, be released to stand trial at the High Court (Financial Court) to begin the necessary proceedings against him. In June 2020, the Speaker of Parliament rejected Mahama Ayariga's challenging the Electoral Commission's decision to make the Ghana card and passports the sole valid identification for registering to vote in the 2020 elections.

== Personal life ==
Ayariga is married. He is a Muslim. His father, Frank Abdulai Ayariga, also served as member of parliament for the Bawku Constituency during the third republic administration of Hilla Limann.

== See also ==
- Frank Abdulai Ayariga
- Hassan Ayariga

Parliament of Ghana
Preceded by Hawa Yakubu	MP for Bawku Central; 2005 – 2009	Succeeded by Adamu Dramani Sakande
Preceded by Adamu Dramani Sakande	MP for Bawku Central; 2013 – present	Incumbent
Political offices
Preceded by	Deputy Minister for Trade and Industry ? – ?	Incumbent
Preceded by	Deputy Minister for Education ? – ?	Incumbent
