= Abdul-Samed Muhamed Gunu =

Ghanaian politician

Abdul-Samed Muhamed Gunu (born 6 April 1966) is a Ghanaian politician and a member of the New Patriotic Party. He served in the Seventh Parliament of the Fourth Republic of Ghana, representing the Savelugu Constituency in the Northern Region.

== Early life and education ==
Gunu hails from Savelugu in the northern region of Ghana. He attended Ghana Senior High School in Tamale, popularly known as GHANASCO. He studied accounting at Tamale Polytechnic in the year 2000 and proceeded to obtain a master's degree in NGO and Rural Development from the University for Development Studies in the year 2010.

== Politics ==
Gunu was a member of the seventh parliament of the fourth Republic of Ghana . In 2016 elections, he became his party's first candidate to win the Savelugu Parliamentary seat with a total of 13,334 votes, representing 34.21% of the total valid votes cast. Gunu served as a Member of Parliament from January 2017 to January 2021. He lost his second term bid in the 2020 Presidential and Parliamentary elections to Jacob Iddriss Abdulai of the National Democratic Congress. Gunu alleged that the election was marred with irregularities and challenged the Parliamentary election results at the Tamale High Court. However, in January 2023, the Court dismissed his petition, declaring his opponent as validly elected. The Court ordered Gunu to pay 40,000 Cedis to the Electoral Commission and another 20,000 Cedis to Jacob Iddriss Abdulai.

In December 2023, Gunu made another attempt to represent his Party as its Candidate for the 2024 Elections. He lost the parliamentary primaries by obtaining just 121 votes as against 532 votes garnered by his main contender, Fathiya Aziz, a presidential staffer.

== Personal life ==
He is a Muslim and married with eight children.
