= 2016 Ghanaian general election =

- 7 December 2016
- Presidential election
- Turnout: 69.25%
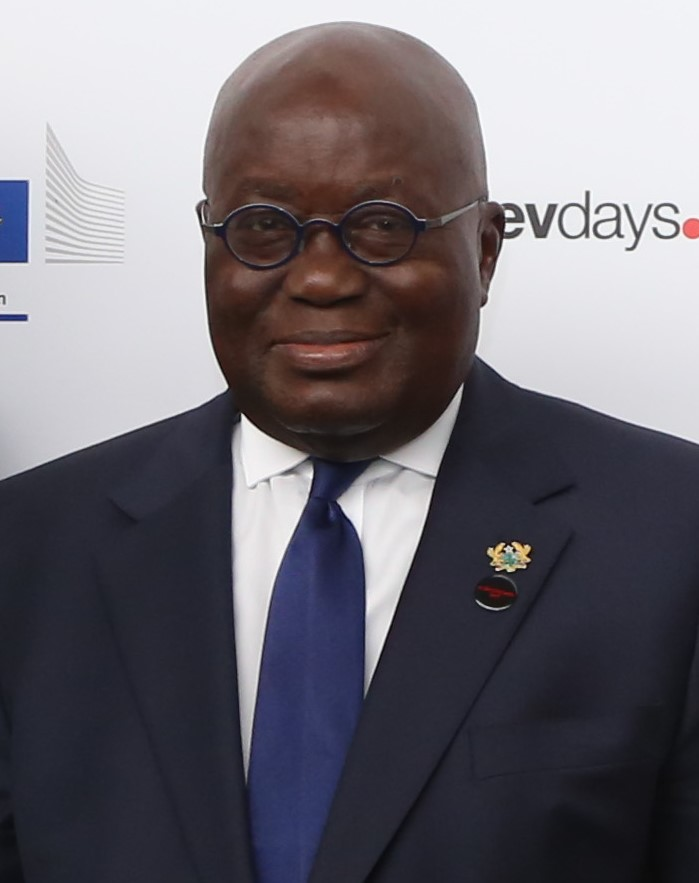

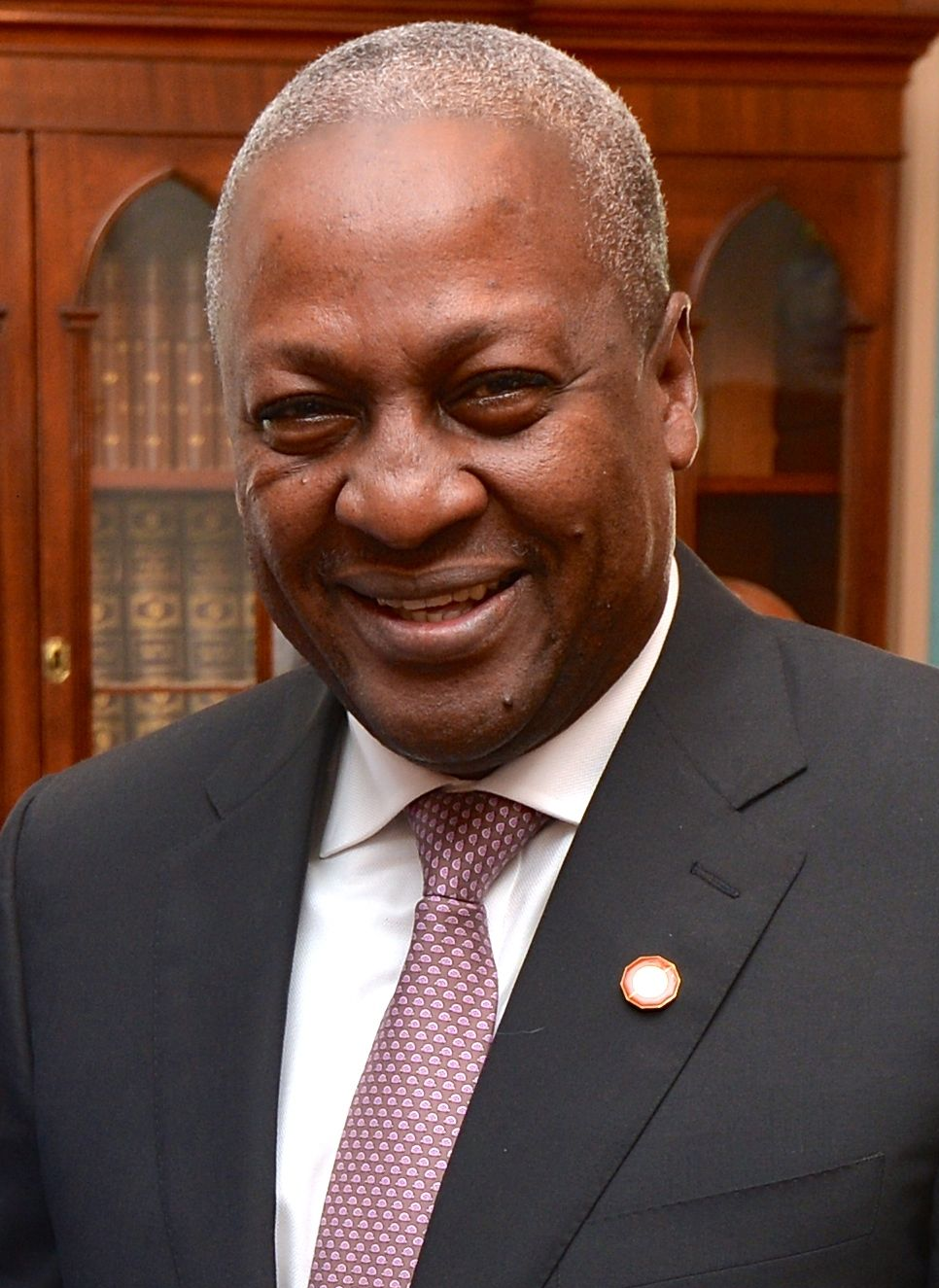
Nominee	Nana Akufo-Addo	John Mahama
Party	NPP	NDC
Running mate	Mahamudu Bawumia	Kwesi Amissah-Arthur
Popular vote	5,755,758	4,771,188
Percentage	53.72%	44.53%
President before election
John Mahama
NDC
President-elect
Nana Akufo-Addo
NPP
- Parliamentary election
- All 275 seats in Parliament; 138 seats needed for a majority
Party	Leader	Vote %	Seats	+/–
NPP	Nana Akufo-Addo	52.48	169	+47
NDC	John Mahama	42.28	106	−42
This lists parties that won seats. See the complete results below.
Speaker before	Speaker after
Edward Adjaho; NDC	Aaron Mike Oquaye; NPP
- Maps
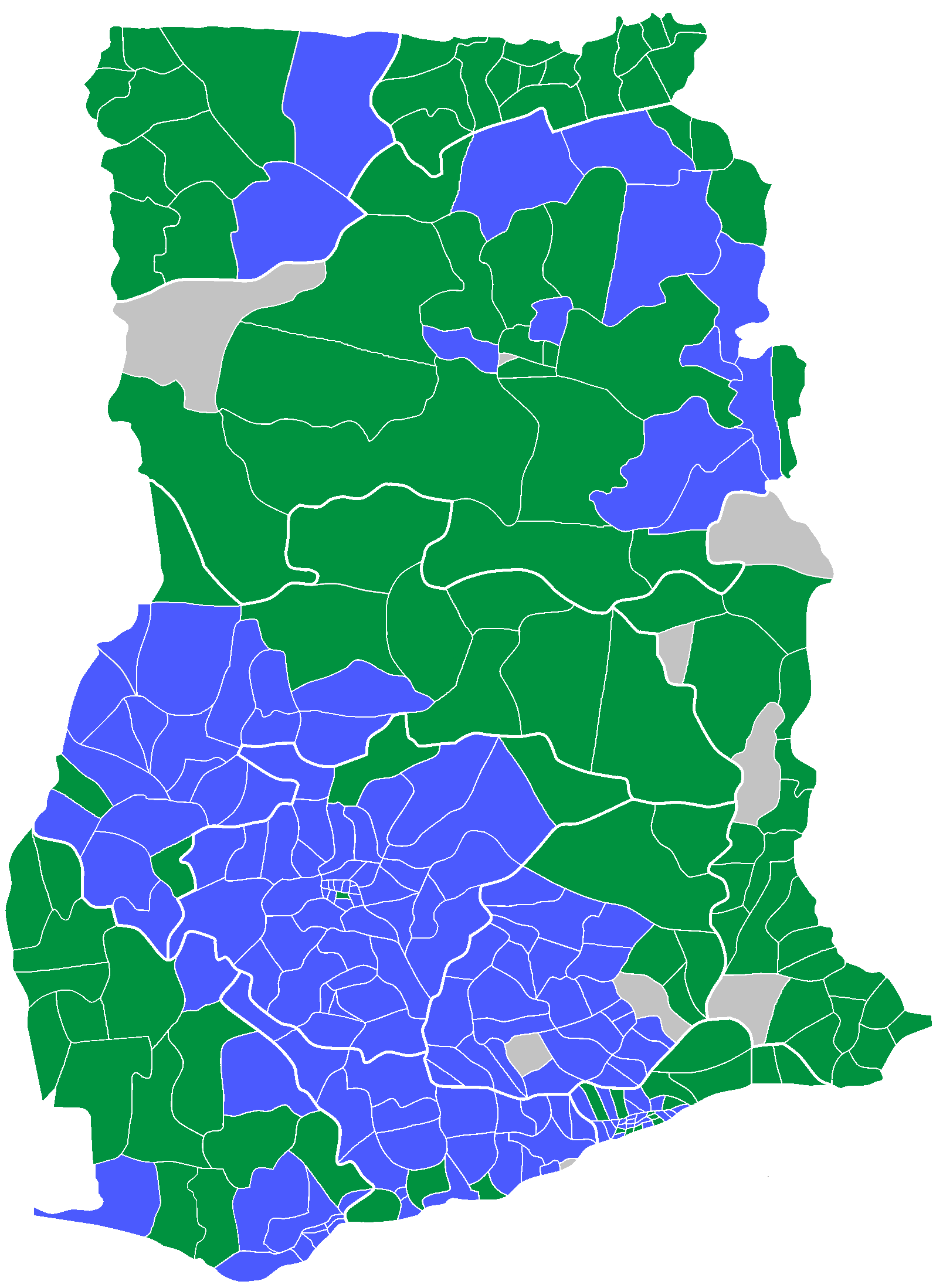

General elections were held in Ghana on 7 December 2016 to elect a President and all 275 Members of Parliament. They had originally been scheduled for 7 November 2016, but the date was later rejected by Parliament. Former foreign minister Nana Akufo-Addo of the opposition New Patriotic Party was elected President on his third attempt, defeating incumbent President John Mahama of the National Democratic Congress.

The election results were announced on 9 December 2016 due to a delay of voting in two areas. At 19:51 local time, Mahama called Akufo-Addo to concede defeat. At 20:45, the Electoral Commission declared that Akufo-Addo had defeated Mahama in a single round. It was the first time in Ghana's history that a sitting president had been defeated for reelection.

== Electoral system ==
The president is elected using the two-round system, whilst the 275 members of Parliament are elected in single-member constituencies using first-past-the-post voting.

Eligible voters must be Ghanaian citizens aged 18 or over, although those declared insane are disenfranchised. Parliamentary candidates must be Ghanaian citizens at least 21 years old, and either be resident in their constituency or have lived there for at least five of the ten years prior to the election.

== Campaign ==
=== Presidential candidates ===
Over 16 people filed with the election commission to run for president. However, 13 presidential candidates were disqualified due to incorrect filing procedures. The disqualified candidates included former first lady Nana Konadu Agyeman Rawlings, the president of the National Democratic Party. There was some controversy due to allegations that the candidates were disqualified for political reasons. The Electoral Commission denied all accusations. After the disqualification, only four presidential candidates remained. However, the presidential candidate of the Progressive People's Party (PPP) Paa Kwesi Nduom took the EC to court over his disqualification. The court finally ruled in his favour, allowing him to join the race. Two other candidates who were disqualified also followed suit, leading to there being seven candidates.

Ivor Greenstreet from the Convention People's Party was the first physically challenged candidate to contest a presidential election.

Party	Presidential Candidate	Running Mate
National Democratic Congress	John Dramani Mahama	Kwesi Amissah-Arthur
Convention People's Party	Ivor Greenstreet	Gabby Nsiah Nketiah
New Patriotic Party	Nana Akufo-Addo	Mahamudu Bawumia
Progressive People's Party	Paa Kwesi Nduom	Brigitte Dzogbenuku
People's National Convention	Edward Mahama	Emmanuel Anyidoho
National Democratic Party	Nana Konadu Agyeman Rawlings	Kojo Mensah Sosu
Independent Candidate	Jacob Osei Yeboah	Daniel Wilson Torto

Incumbent John Mahama was eligible for a second full term since he had ascended to the presidency with only six months remaining in the term of his predecessor and running mate, John Atta Mills. In Ghana, when a vice-president ascends to the presidency with more than half of a presidential term remaining, he is only allowed to run for a single full term in his own right. If more than half of the term has expired, the vice-president is eligible for two full terms.

=== Parliamentary candidates ===
A total of 1,144 candidates contested the 275 seats in Parliament. The NDC and NPP both ran full slates of 275 candidates, whilst the CPP (222 candidates) and PPP (163) were the only two other parties to run in over half the seats. The PNC nominated 64 candidates, the NDP 33, the APC 20, the GCPP 10, the UFP six and the DPP and UPP both had only one candidate. The other 74 candidates were independents.

== Opinion polls ==
=== President ===
Poll source	Date	Sample size	Undecided	Mahama NDC	Akufo-Addo NPP	Nduom PPP	Greenstreet CPP	Other candidates	Notes
Restart International	5 December 2016	2,000		54.7%	43.7%				
Ben Ephson	28 November 2016	N/A		52.4%	45.9%	1.7%			2% margin of error
Ben Ephson	October 2016	N/A		50.8%	47.5%	1.7%			2% margin of error
Goodman AMC	August 2016	2,184	N/A	48%	45%	7%	0%		2.1% margin of error
Goodman AMC	June 2016	1,644	N/A	44%	49%	6%	1%		2.3% margin of error
Goodman AMC	April 2016	1,216	N/A	32%	65%	3%	0%		

== Results ==
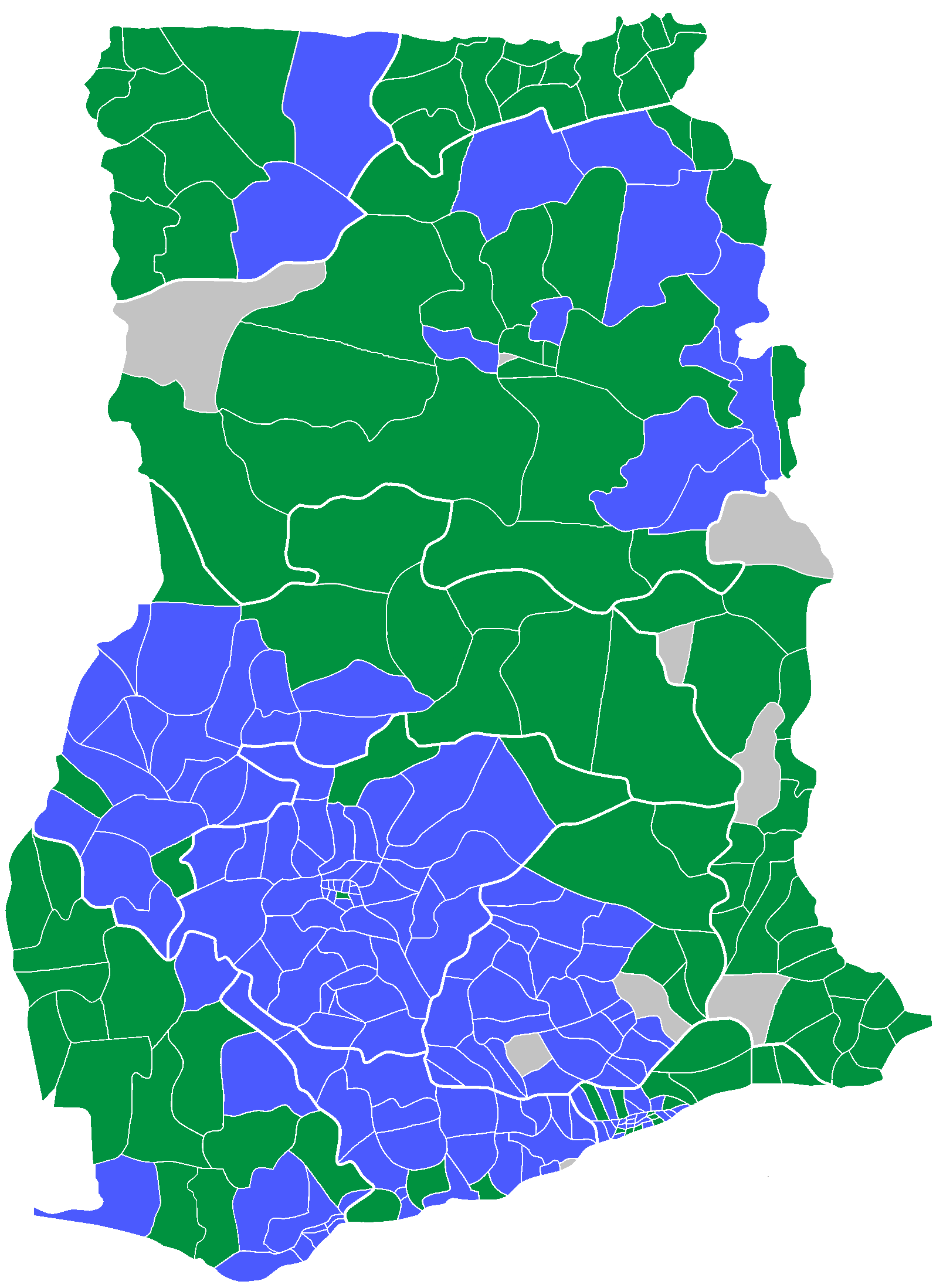
Constituencies won by ■ – Nana Akufo-Addo ■ – John Dramani Mahama

=== President ===
Candidate	Running mate	Party	Votes	%
Nana Akufo-Addo	Mahamudu Bawumia	New Patriotic Party	5,755,758	53.72
John Dramani Mahama	Kwesi Amissah-Arthur	National Democratic Congress	4,771,188	44.53
Paa Kwesi Nduom	Brigitte Dzogbenuku	Progressive People's Party	106,092	0.99
Ivor Greenstreet	Gabby Nsiah Nketiah	Convention People's Party	25,552	0.24
Edward Mahama	Emmanuel Anyidoho	People's National Convention	22,298	0.21
Nana Konadu Agyeman Rawlings	Kojo Mensah Sosu	National Democratic Party	16,935	0.16
Jacob Osei Yeboah	Daniel Wilson Torto	Independent	15,911	0.15
Total			10,713,734	100.00
Valid votes			10,713,734	98.46
Invalid/blank votes			167,349	1.54
Total votes			10,881,083	100.00
Registered voters/turnout			15,712,499	69.25
Source: Electoral Commission Ghana

==== By region ====
Region				
Region	Nana Akufo-Addo NPP		John Dramani Mahama NDC	
Region	Votes	%	Votes	%
Ashanti	1,640,694	75.98	503,497	23.32
Brong-Ahafo	531,147	53.87	422,789	44.91
Central	496,668	53.22	405,262	43.43
Eastern	674,240	63.30	379,675	35.65
Greater Accra	1,062,157	52.42	946,048	46.69
Northern	429,375	41.89	569,853	55.59
Upper East	157,398	34.93	271,796	60.32
Upper West	102,843	35.94	167,032	58.37
Volta	135,077	17.38	629,398	80.97
Western	526,159	52.38	455,838	45.38
Source: Electoral Commission Ghana

=== Parliament ===
Party	Votes	%	Seats	+/–
New Patriotic Party	5,661,248	52.48	169	+47
National Democratic Congress	4,560,491	42.28	106	–42
Progressive People's Party	186,741	1.73	0	0
Convention People's Party	69,346	0.64	0	–1
People's National Convention	42,236	0.39	0	–1
National Democratic Party	19,450	0.18	0	0
All People's Congress	2,527	0.02	0	New
Great Consolidated Popular Party	1,368	0.01	0	0
United Front Party	896	0.01	0	0
Democratic People's Party	867	0.01	0	0
United Progressive Party	430	0.00	0	New
Independents	241,884	2.24	0	–3
Total	10,787,484	100.00	275	0
Valid votes	10,787,484	98.98		
Invalid/blank votes	111,137	1.02		
Total votes	10,898,621	100.00		
Registered voters/turnout	15,639,690	69.69		
Source: Election Passport

== See also ==
- List of MPs elected in the 2016 Ghanaian parliamentary election
