= People's National Convention (Ghana) =

Political party in Ghana

- Leader: Bernard Anbataayela Mornah
- Chairman: Samson Asaki Awingobit
- General Secretary: Awudulai Ishaq
- 1st Vice Chairman: Martin Anafo
- National Organiser: Abas Nuhu
- National youth Organiser: Mark Ewusi Arkoh
- National Women's Organiser: Esther Osei Danso
- National treasure: Emmanuel Akazabre
- Founder: Hilla Limann
- Founded: 27 July 1992
- Headquarters: Arts Centre, Accra
- Ideology: Nkrumaism; Socialism; Pan-Africanism
- Colors: Red, green and white
- Slogan: Ɛyɛ kubɛ Service with honesty
- Parliament: 0 / 275

Election symbol
- Palm tree

Party flag

The People's National Convention is a political party in Ghana. After constitutional rule was restored back in Ghana in 1992 the party was formed by former President Hilla Limann based on ideals from the People's National Party which he led in the 1979 elections and won.

== Electoral performance ==
=== 1992 Elections ===
The PNC has contested all national elections since the inception of the fourth republic apart from the 1992 parliamentary election, which was boycotted along with other opposition parties.

=== 2004 Elections ===
At the elections held on 7 December 2004, the party was part of the Grand Coalition, which won four out of 230 seats. Edward Mahama, candidate of the Grand Coalition, won 1.9% of the vote at the presidential elections.

=== 2008 Elections ===
At the December 2008 elections, the party won two seats in Parliament. For the fourth time in a row, Edward Mahama was the presidential candidate. He received 0.8% of the vote.

=== 2012 Elections ===
Hassan Ayariga was elected in 2011 by the party to stand in the 2012 presidential election. Ayariga received 0.22% of the vote.

=== 2016 Elections ===
The party elected new officials in 2015, with Edward Mahama becoming its presidential candidate and General Secretary Bernard Mornah becoming the chairman. The new National Treasurer is now Akane Adams who is taken over from his predecessor David Apasera, a former member of Parliament for Bolga Central. Hassan Ayariga who led the party in the 2012 elections quit the party after losing to Edward Mahama and decided to start his own party All People's Congress.

=== 2024 election ===
Bernard Mornah was nominated to be the presidential candidate for the PNC. He was duly registered as the candidate for the party but was disqualified by the Electoral Commission from contesting the position of President.

== Election results ==
=== Presidential elections ===
Election	Candidate	First round		Second round		Result
Election	Candidate	Votes	%	Votes	%	Result
1992	Hilla Limann	266,728	6.7%	—		Lost ✗
1996	Edward Mahama	211,136	3.0%	—		Lost ✗
2000	Edward Mahama	189,659	2.5%	—		Lost ✗
2004	Edward Mahama	165,375	1.9%	—		Lost ✗
2008	Edward Mahama	73,494	0.9%	—		Lost ✗
2012	Hassan Ayariga	24,617	0.22%	—		Lost ✗
2016	Edward Mahama	22,214	0.21%	—		Lost ✗
2020	David Apasera	10,882	0.08%	—		Lost ✗

=== Parliamentary elections ===
Election	Votes	%	Seats	+/–	Position	Result
1996	226,643	3.3%	1 / 200	New	▲4th	Opposition
2000	224,657	3.4%	3 / 200	▲2	▲3rd	Opposition
2004	186,226	2.1%	4 / 200	▲1	3rd	Opposition
2008	117,732	1.4%	2 / 200	▼2	▼4th	Opposition
2012	72,618	0.66%	1 / 200	▼1	▼5th	Opposition
2016	42,236	0.39%	0 / 200	▼1	5th	Extra-parliamentary
2020	29,211	0.22%	0 / 200	0	▲4th	Extra-parliamentary
2024	8,501	0.07%	0 / 200	0	▲3rd	Extra-parliamentary
