= Kofi Asare =

Ghanaian politician (1954–2017)

Hon. Kofi Asare

Member of Parliament Elect for Akwatia Constituency
- Preceded by: Kinston Akomeng Kissi
- Succeeded by: Baba Jamal Ahmed
- In office 7 January 2009 – 6 January 2013

Personal details
- Born: 12 December 1954 Akyem-Wenchi, Eastern Region
- Died: 21 February 2017 (aged 62)
- Party: New Patriotic Party
- Children: 4
- Education: University of London
- Profession: Medical Doctor

Kofi Asare was a Ghanaian medical doctor and politician. He was the Regional Director of Ghana Health Service in Central Region, Cape Coast. He also served as the Member of Parliament for the Akwatia constituency in the Eastern Region.

== Early life and education ==
Asare was born on December 12, 1954, at Akyem-Wenchi in Eastern Region. He obtained a Master of Science degree in Public Health at the University of London in 1993.

== Politics ==
Asare was a member of the Fifth Parliament of the Fourth Republic of Ghana. Running on the New Patriotic Party (NPP) ticket in the 2008 general elections, Asare defeated Ahmed Mohammed Baba-Jamal of the National Democratic Congress and three others to win the Akwatia parliamentary seat. The one-term MP polled 17,900 votes to defeat Mr Baba-Jamal who polled 15,860 in the elections. Asare lost the seat four years later in the 2012 Ghanaian General elections to Mr Baba Jamal after he was defeated in the NPP primaries by Madam Mercy Adu-Gyamfi.

== Personal life ==
Asare was a Presbyterian, married with four children.

== Death ==
He died in a car accident on the Nkawkaw-Accra highway on 21 February 2017 at the age of 62.
