= Hausa Ajami =

Arabic script for Hausa

Hausa Ajami Baƙaƙen larabci بَࢼَࢼٜىٰࢽْ لعَرَبْثِی بَقَقٜیٰنْ لعَرَبْثِي
- Script type: Abjad
- Period: c. 16 c. to the present
- Direction: Right-to-left
- Languages: Hausa

Related scripts
- Parent systems: Proto-Sinaitic: Phoenician; Aramaic; Nabataean; Arabic; Hausa Ajami

Hausa Ajami script is an Arabic script derivative for writing the Hausa language. Ajami is a name commonly given to alphabets derived from Arabic script for the use of various African languages, from Swahili to Hausa, Fulfulde, and Wolof.

Hausa ajami is an alphabet where vowel sounds are written using a mixture of combining marks and letters. Unlike Semitic languages such as Arabic that build words on consonant patterns and so normally hide vowel diacritics in the Arabic script, it can be difficult to read Hausa text without the full vowel information, and therefore Hausa retains all vowel diacritics in the text.

In Niger and Nigeria, there exist two general orthographic traditions, each derived from two Quranic orthographic practices. One of these is based on the Quran recitation and inscription of the 8th century religious scholar Hafs ibn Sulayman, the other based on the Quran recitation and inscription of another 8th Century scholar, Warsh. Hafs tradition is the most popular across the Muslim world, and especially in Egypt, the Levant, and the Arabian Peninsula. Warsh tradition is the second most popular tradition across the Muslim world, and has been especially popular in North Africa, West Africa, and Andalusia. In Niger and Nigeria, Warsh is the orthographic convention preferred by local Sufi schools and scholars (including Tijaniyyah and Qadiriyya schools), whereas Hafs is the orthographic convention preferred by Sunni schools and scholars, including the Salafi Izala Society. While technically such distinction between Sufis and Sunnis does not theologically exist, this is a good approximation of the sociolinguistic situation.

While Hafs is generally always written in Naskh, Warsh is written either in Naskh, or in Maghrebi script, following North African traditions, and in a local calligraphic tradition.

From Nigerian independence up until 2007, the Hausa text on Nigerian naira banknotes were written in Warsh script. Prior to independence, British West African pound banknotes included Hausa text written in Hafs script.

== Name ==
The name 'Ajami' came to be used in such a way for the adoption of Arabic script to write a non-Arabic language in Africa. Originally, 'Ajami' referred to non-Arab language in Africa, as it did elsewhere in the Muslim world too, with Persian, Turkish, Malay, Spanish, etc. being referred to as 'Ajami'. Thus, in Northern Nigeria for example, languages such as Hausa and Fulfulde where referred to as 'Ajami languages'. Thus by extension, texts written in such languages were referred to as 'Ajami', simply meaning "foreign", and to be distinguished from texts written in Arabic. But, it was in colonial Northern Nigeria that the earlier notion of 'Ajami language' (Hausa, Fulfulde) was misinterpreted and transformed into 'Ajami script'.

It was within the context of this development that Mervyn Hiskett states that 'It [Hausa] is now written for official and scholastic purposes in the Roman script (with the addition of three special letters), but the older Arabic script (known as ajami) is still extensively used for private correspondence and religious tracts'.

Over time, this misrepresentation by European Christian missionaries, colonial officials, and Africologists, was adopted by native Hausa-speaking scholars as well. For example, famed Hausa linguist, Ibrahim Yaro Yahaya, uses 'Ajami' in such a way.

== History ==
Hausa Ajamī, the use of Arabic alphabet for non-Arabic language writing, has been developed as a form of discourse by Islamic clerics in Hausa city states since the large-scale introduction of Islam in the region through Malian cleric merchants in the 14th century. Although not widely spread, it nevertheless provided those fluent in its script with a literacy device that enabled them to exchange written communication, without necessarily being fluent in the Arabic language. The etymology of the word itself denotes a non-native Arab.

The use of Arabic script to write local languages of West Africa, including Hausa, started by the Islamic clerics in Hausa city states since the large-scale arrival of Islam in the region through Malian cleric merchants in the 14th century. Although not initially widely used, it nevertheless provided those fluent in its script with a literacy device that enabled them to exchange written communication, without necessarily being fluent in the Arabic. However, for many centuries, Arabic was the literary language of Hausa city-states, as it was seen as the more prestigious means of communication. In fact, for centuries, it was the semi-nomadic Fulfulde community of Northern Nigeria that wrote its native language in 'Ajami script' than the urban-rural Hausa community.

Pre-colonial Hausa writings in Arabic script have been described as mostly Islamic literature, usually in verse as opposed to 'essentially un-Islamic' oral prose, as well as some historical chronicles, folktales, official and private correspondence. But nevertheless, the development of Hausa Ajami orthography was both successful and marginalized by the predominance of Arabic. And thus, pre-colonial Hausa was never standardized, never diverged into a single set of conventions across different literatures. Another thing that can be concludied is that, geographically speaking, there were two poles of attraction in Hausa literature. One variety of Hausa Ajami may be described as Western or Sokoto-centred and close to the written traditions of the Central Niger region. Another variety, based in Kano, which looks like an offshoot of the venerable centuries-old tradition of Borno (Kanuri language) Ajami. Both were reflected not just in their specific conventions of transcription, but also in their respective styles of handwriting. This divergencep ersisted through the 19th and the 20th century, with the development of the two orthographic traditions, Warsh and Hafs.

British and German colonization of West Africa, and specifically encroachment of Christian missionaries, coinciding with the Fula jihads and the literary boom brought by the consolidation of the Sokoto Caliphate, resulted in the start of a 'golden age of Ajami', during which Arabic-script Hausa writings were 'flourishing in the 19th century and continuing into the 20th', prior to the decision of the British colonial authorities to romanize the Hausa language in 1930. On the one hand, Islamic scholars and local rulers relied ever so greatly on Arabic-script Hausa to communicate and to express literature. On the other, the bureaucratic needs of the time, compelled mid-level colonial administrators to rely on Ajami Hausa. And thirdly, missionaries thought that using Ajami to write and communicate in the local language would best facilitate the spread of their work and would best connect them with the Hausa populous.

Despite the disillusionment of bureaucrats, both colonial and post-independence natives, and despite the spread of Latin alphabet through secular education, Christian missionaries have remained interested in Ajami script as one of the ways to communicate in Hausa. Throughout the 20th and the 21st century, various translated Christian literature have been produced in Ajami, including a 2020 Bible translation into Ajami-script Hausa.

== Alphabet ==
As Hausa Ajami script was never recognized and regulated officially, there has never been a top down imposition of a unified convention. Standardization of letters in Ajami has happened over time and in various stages, in synch with neighbouring Ajami traditions, as well as external factors.

For example, vowels in Hausa Ajami script, including representation of vowel [e], and differentiation of short versus long vowels, were one of the first aspects to be unified and standardized. Consonants on the other hand, especially consonant letters for representing sounds that don't exist in Arabic, took longer to become standardized. Some new letters were even coined in the late 19th and early 20th century, and because of the direct influence of the Boko alphabet (Latin alphabet). For example, whereas previously in writing, sounds [b] and [ɓ] may have usually been written with a single character ba 'ب', it was the innovation of introducing the separate letter in Latin alphabet that created an impetus for scholars writing in Ajami script, to innovate and introduce a separate Ajami letter for the distinct sound as well.

=== Letters ===
Below is the list of letters of Hausa Ajami, in both Warsh and Hafs traditions. Beige highlight marks letters that are only used for writing of loan words of Arabic or European origin. Green highlight marks letters that are innovations of Hausa orthography and are not used in Arabic language.

Hausa Ajami (Warsh Convention)
Letter (Naskh)	Letter (Hausawi/Kanuri)	Latin Equivalent	IPA	Unicode
ا	ا	‌- A a	[∅]/[ʔ]/[aː]	U+0627
ب	ب	‌B b	[b]	U+0628
ݑ	ݑ	‌Ɓ ɓ	[ɓ]	U+0751
ت	ت	‌T t	[t]	U+062A
ث	ث	‌C c	[t͡ʃ]	U+062B
ج	ج	‌J j	[d͡ʒ]	U+062C
ح	ح	‌H h	[h]	U+062D
خ	خ	‌H h (Kh kh)	[h]	U+062E
د	د	‌D d	[d]	U+062F
ذ	ذ	‌Z z	[z]	U+0630
ر	ر	‌R r	[ɽ]/[ɾ]	U+0631
ز	ز	‌Z z	[z]	U+0632
س	س	‌S s	[s]	U+0633
ش	ش	‌Sh sh ( (Nigeria) ) Ch ch( (Niger) )	[ʃ]	U+0634
ص	ص	‌S s	[s]	U+0635
ض	ض	‌L l	[l]	U+0636
ط	ط	‌Ɗ ɗ	[ɗ]	U+0637
ظ	ظ	Z z	[z]	U+0638
ڟ	ڟ	‌Ts ts	[t͡s]/[sʼ]	U+069F
ع	ع	‌ʼ	[∅]/[ʔ]	U+0639
غ	غ	‌G g	[ɡ]	U+063A
ڠ	ࣃ	‌Gw gw Gy gy	[ɡʷ]/[ɡʲ]	U+08C3 (U+06A0)
ࢻـ ࢻ	ࢻـ ࢻ	‌F f	[ɸ]/[f]	U+088B
ڥ	ڥ	P p	[p]	U+06A5
ࢼـ ࢼ	ࢼـ ࢼ	‌Ƙ ƙ	[ƙ]	U+08BC
ڨ	ࣄـ ࣄ	‌Ƙw ƙw Ƙy ƙy	[ƙʷ]/[ƙʲ]	U+08C4 (U+06A8)
ک	ک	‌K k	[k]	U+06A9
ݣ	ݣ	‌Kw kw Ky ky	[kʷ]/[kʲ]	U+0763
ل	ل	‌L l	[l]	U+0644
م	م	‌M m	[m]	U+0645
ࢽـ ࢽ	ࢽـ ࢽ	‌N n	[n]	U+08BD
هـ ه	هـ ه	‌H h	[h]	U+0647
و	و	‌W w O o U u	[w] ([oː][uː])	U+0648
ی	ی	‌Y y I i	[j] ([iː])	U+06CC
ىٰ	ىٰ	‌E e	[eː]	U+0649 plus U+0670
ؿـ ؿ	ؿـ ؿ	‌ˈy ( (Nigeria) ) Ƴ ƴ( (Niger) )	[ˀj]/[ʄ]	U+063F

Hausa Ajami (Hafs Convention)
Letter (Naskh)	Latin Equivalent	IPA	Unicode
ا	‌- A a	[∅]/[ʔ]/[aː]	U+0627
ب	‌B b	[b]	U+0628
ٻ	‌Ɓ ɓ	[ɓ]	U+067B
ت	‌T t	[t]	U+062A
ث	‌C c	[t͡ʃ]	U+062B
ج	‌J j	[d͡ʒ]	U+062C
ح	‌H h	[h]	U+062D
خ	‌H h (Kh kh)	[h]	U+062E
د	‌D d	[d]	U+062F
ذ	‌Z z	[z]	U+0630
ر	‌R r	[ɽ]/[ɾ]	U+0631
ز	‌Z z	[z]	U+0632
س	‌S s	[s]	U+0633
ش	‌Sh sh ( (Nigeria) ) Ch ch( (Niger) )	[ʃ]	U+0634
ص	‌S s	[s]	U+0635
ض	‌L l	[l]	U+0636
ط	‌Ɗ ɗ	[ɗ]	U+0637
ظ	Z z	[z]	U+0638
ڟ	‌Ts ts	[t͡s]/[sʼ]	U+069F
ع	‌ʼ	[∅]/[ʔ]	U+0639
غ	‌G g	[ɡ]	U+063A
ڠ	‌Gw gw Gy gy	[ɡʷ]/[ɡʲ]	U+06A0
ف	‌F f	[ɸ]/[f]	U+0641
ڥ	P p	[p]	U+06A5
ق	‌Ƙ ƙ	[ƙ]	U+0642
ڨ	‌Ƙw ƙw Ƙy ƙy	[ƙʷ]/[ƙʲ]	U+06A8
ك	‌K k	[k]	U+0643
ڭ	‌Kw kw Ky ky	[kʷ]/[kʲ]	U+06AD
ل	‌L l	[l]	U+0644
م	‌M m	[m]	U+0645
ن	‌N n	[n]	U+0646
هـ ه	‌H h	[h]	U+0647
و	‌W w O o U u	[w] ([oː][uː])	U+0648
ي	‌Y y I i	[j] ([iː])	U+064A
ىٰ	‌E e	[eː]	U+0649 plus U+0670
ۑـ ۑ	‌ˈy ( (Nigeria) ) Ƴ ƴ( (Niger) )	[ˀj]/[ʄ]	U+06D1

=== Vowels ===
Hausa has five basic vowels, each with a short and lengthened correspondence. There also two additional diphthongs. These are [a], [e], [i], [o], [u] and their lengthened counterparts. It does need to be noted that vowels [o] and [e] are almost always in the long form, and rarely in the short form.

In normal daily Latin orthography, short and long vowels are not distinguished. Vowel lengths are thus only shown in Latin phonetic or phonemic transcriptions. However, in Ajami script, they are always written down. However, in spoken pronunciation, the contrast between vowel lengths does matter, and a difference in vowel length does change the meaning of a word. Vowel lengthening must be observed if the speaker wants to convey the proper meaning in Hausa. Failure to observe it may make his utterance meaningless. At best, such a failure may suggest to the Hausa listener that the subject is either a novice in the language or is a victim of speech defect. Thus, in this regard, Hausa is therefore more accurately written in Ajami than in Latin script.

Hausa is also a tonal language. Each of its five vowels may have low tone, high tone or falling tone. But tones are omitted and not written down, neither in normal daily Latin orthography nor in Ajami script.

Whereas in Arabic, there are 3 diacritics corresponding to the vowels [a], [u], [i]; Hausa has 5 basic vowels. Vowels are written in an identical fashion in both Warsh-derived and Hafs-derived traditions of Hausa Ajami.

In Hausa, vowel [a] is shown as it would be in Arabic, with a fatha diacritic '◌َ'. A long vowel [aː] is indicated by writing an alif succeeding the letter and diacritic 'ـَا'.

In Hausa Ajami orthography, there is no distinguishing between [o] and [u]. They are both shown with damma diacritic '◌ُ'. Some languages in West Africa, especially in Western Sahel, do have a distinction, where the vowel [o] is marked with an inverted damma, but this is not the case in Hausa. Long vowels [oː] and [uː] are indicated by writing a waw succeeding the letter and diacritic 'ـُو'. There were some attempts at innovating a convention to show the vowel [o] in Hausa Ajami in the 19th and 20th centuries, but those did not catch on. In Hausa, the vowel [o] is almost always in its lengthened form. In a final position, the long vowel [oː] is distinguished from the long vowel [uː], by writing an additional alif + sukun diacritic 'ـُواْ'. The 2020 Hausa Bible translation uses alif + sukun diacritic in medial positions as well. Some other manuscripts place a sukun over the waw 'ـُوْ' which is written optionally.

In Hausa, vowels [i] and [e] are distinguished, vowel [i] shown with a kasra diacritic '◌ِ', while [e] is shown with a subscript dot diacritic, known as imāla. As mentioned before, Hausa Ajami orthography draws from the Warsh Quran recitation traditions. In Warsh, there are instnaces where, based on Old Arabic, the vowel [a] is raised and moved to the front, and is pronounced approximately as an [e]. This has been marked in Warsh Quran transcription, with an imala diacritic ◌ٜ.

A long vowel [iː] is indicated by writing an ya succeeding the letter and diacritic 'ـِیـ ـِی'. Vowel [e] is considered a combined [a+i] vowel in Warsh Quranic recitation tradition. Thus a long vowel [eː] is indicated by a combined dotless ya + superscript alif 'ــٜىٰـ ـٜىٰ'.

Vowels at the beginning of a word (or in the middle of a word, but at the beginning of a syllable) require a letter to act as carrier of the diacritic, and in Hausa, this carrier letter has a glottal sound [ʔ]. While the expected letter for this role is alif 'ا', in Hausa, in some manuscripts and for some vowels, the letter ayn 'ع' is also used. Table below illustrates word-initial vowels with alif as its carrier.

Vowel at the beginning of a word
A	E	I	O	U
Short Vowels
أَ	اٜ	إِ	أُ	أُ
أَ	اٜ	إِ	أُ	أُ
Long Vowels
آ	اٜىٰـ / اٜىٰ	إِیـ / إِی	أُوْ	أُو
آ	اٜىٰـ / اٜىٰ	إِیـ / إِی	أُوْ	أُو

Below table shows word-medial vowels in Hausa.

Vowel at the middle of a word
a	e	i	o	u
Short Vowels
◌َ	◌ٜ	◌ِ	◌ُ	◌ُ
◌َ	◌ٜ	◌ِ	◌ُ	◌ُ
Long Vowels
◌َا / ـَا	◌ٜىٰـ / ـٜىٰـ	◌ِیـ / ـِیـ	◌ُوْ / ـُوْ	◌ُو / ـُو
◌َا / ـَا	◌ٜىٰـ / ـٜىٰـ	◌ِیـ / ـِیـ	◌ُوْ / ـُوْ	◌ُو / ـُو

Below table shows word-final vowels in Hausa.

Vowel at the end of a word
a	e	i	o	u
Short Vowels
◌َ	◌ٜ	◌ِ	◌ُ	◌ُ
◌َ	◌ٜ	◌ِ	◌ُ	◌ُ
Long Vowels
◌َا / ـَا	◌ٜىٰ / ـٜىٰ	◌ِی / ـِی	◌ُواْ / ـُواْ	◌ُو / ـُو
◌َا / ـَا	◌ٜىٰ / ـٜىٰ	◌ِی / ـِی	◌ُواْ / ـُواْ	◌ُو / ـُو

=== Diphthong ===
There are two diphthongs in Hausa, represented in Latin by au and ai. As per Hausa phonotactics, neither vowel in a diphthong is a long vowel. These diphthongs are written with the letters waw and ya respectively, with sukun or zero-vowel diacritic on top:

Latin	Ajami	Example	
Latin	Ajami	Latin	Ajami
-au-	◌َوْ / ـَوْ	Hausa	هَوْسَا
-au-	◌َوْ / ـَوْ	Hausa	هَوْسَا
-ai-	◌َیْـ / ـَیْـ	Taimako	تَیْمَکُواْ
-ai-	◌َیْـ / ـَیْـ	Taimako	تَیْمَکُواْ

=== Palatalization and labialization ===
There are three letters in Hausa that can be subject to palatalization (secondary articulation of a 'y' [j] sound) or labialization (secondary articulation of a [w] sound). These are 'G g / غ', 'K k / ک', and '‌Ƙ ƙ / ࢼ'. In Boko alphabet, digraphs, combining these letters with either 'y' or 'w' are used. In Ajami, new letters, with 3 dots, have been created for this purpose. Palatalization and labialization are distinguished by the diacritic on top of these unique letters, fatha diacritic '◌َ' and damma diacritic '◌ُ' respectively, and by whether these letters are followed by a waw or by a y. In Hausa, in most but not all cases, these palatized and labialized sounds are followed by an [a] vowel. In Ajami, thus, the subsequent [a] diacritic is dropped. Thus, if these letters are to be followed by a different vowel other than [a], the diacritic is placed on the follow-up letter.

gya	ڠَیـ	ࣃَیـ	gwa	ڠُو	ࣃُو
ƙya	ڨَیـ	ࣄَیـ	ƙwa	ڨُو	ࣄُو
kya	ݣَیـ	ݣَیـ	kwa	ݣُو	ݣُو

=== Punctuation ===
Most Hausa Ajami punctuation is similar to Arabic, Persian, and other languages that use Arabic script, including the Arabic comma '،' and question mark '؟'.

The only distinction is, for a period, Hausa Ajami use the Quranic triple dot '؞' as opposed to a single dot.

== Text samples ==
Article 1 of the Universal Declaration of Human Rights:

Translation
All human beings are born free and equal in dignity and rights. They are endowed with reason and conscience and should act towards one another in a spirit of brotherhood.
Latin	Su dai 'yan-adam, ana haifuwarsu ne duka 'yantattu, kuma kowannensu na da mutunci da hakkoki daidai da na kowa. Suna da hankali da tunani, saboda haka duk abin da za su aikata wa juna, ya kamata su yi shi a cikin 'yan-uwanci.
Ajami (Naskh) (Hafs)	سُو دَيْ ۑَنْ أَدَمْ، أَنَ حَيْفُوَرْسُ نٜىٰ دُكَ ۑَنْتَتُّ، كُمَ كُووَنٜىٰسُ نَا دَ مُتُنْثِ دَ حَكُوْكِي دَيْدَيْ دَ نَا كُوْوَا؞ سُنَ دَ هَنْكَلِي دَ تُنَانِ، سَبُوْدَ حَكَا دُكْ أَبِنْ دَ زَا سُو أَّيْكَتَ وَ جُونَ، يَا كَمَاتَ سُيِ شِ أَ ثِكِنْ ۑَنْ أُوَانْثِ؞
Ajami (Naskh) (Warsh)	سُو دَیْ ؿَنْ أَدَمْ ، أَنَ حَيْڢُوَرْسُ نٜىٰ دُکَ ؿَنْتَتُّ، کُمَ کُووَنٜىٰسُ نَا دَ مُتُنْثِ دَ حَکُوْکِی دَیْدَیْ دَ نَا کُوْوَا؞ سُنَ دَ هَنْکَلِی دَ تُنَانِ سَبُوْدَ حَکَا دُکْ أَبِنْ دَ زَا سُو أَیْکَتَ وَ جُونَ، یَا کَمَاتَ سُیِ شِ أَ ثِکِنْ ؿَنْ أُوَانْثِ؞
Ajami (Hausa Calligraphy) (Warsh)	سُو دَیْ ؿَنْ أّدَمْ، أّنَ حَيْڢُوَرْسُ نٜىٰ دُکَ ؿَنْتَتُّ، کُمَ کُووَنٜىٰسُ نَا دَ مُتُنْثِ دَ حَکُوْکِی دَیْدَیْ دَ نَا کُوْوَا؞ سُنَ دَ هَنْکَلِی دَ تُنَانِ سَبُوْدَ حَکَا دُکْ أَبِنْ دَ زَا سُو أَیْکَتَ وَ جُونَ، یَا کَمَاتَ سُیِ شِ أَ ثِکِنْ ؿَنْ أُوَانْثِ؞
