= Yahaya Seidu =

Ghanaian politician

Hon. Yahaya Seidu

MP for Ayawaso East constituency
- In office 7 January 1993 – 7 January 1997
- President: Jerry John Rawlings
- Succeeded by: Farouk Braimah

Personal details
- Born: 25 January 1945 (age 81)
- Party: National Democratic Congress
- Occupation: Politician
- Profession: Self Employed

Yahaya Seidu (born 1945) is a Ghanaian politician. He served as a Member of parliament for Ayawaso East constituency in Greater Accra Region of Ghana.

== Early life ==
Yahaya Seidu was born on 25 January 1945, and was a member of parliament for the first parliament of the fourth republic representing the Ayawaso East constituency in the Greater Accra Region of Ghana.

== Career ==
Yahaya Seidu was self employed before entering the parliament in 1993 as a member of the first parliament of the fourth republic of Ghana.

== Politics ==
Yahaya Seidu was working on his own before getting into the parliament during the 1992 Ghanaian parliamentary election on the ticket of the National Democratic Congress as a member of the first parliament of the fourth republic of Ghana.

He lost the seat to Farouk Braimah of National Democratic Congress in 1996 Ghanaian general election who won the seat with 45,605 votes representing 42.70% of the share against his opponents; Yussif Kwame Nkrumah of the New Patriotic Party who had 21,841 votes which represent 20.50% of the total votes cast, Amadu Ibrahim Jebkle of People's National Convention also polled 9,669 votes representing 9.10% of the total votes cast, Abdiel Godly Baba Ali an Independent candidate polled 3,575 which represent 3.40% of the total valid votes, Ahmed Nii Nortey of the National Convention Party also polled 3,397 representing 3.20% and Alhaji Ibrahim Futa of the Convention People's Party polling 1,766 representing 1.70% of the total valid votes.

Braimah was the member of the second parliament for the fourth republic of Ghana for the Ayawaso East Constituency on the ticket of the National Democratic Congress.

== Personal life ==
He is a Muslim.
