= Baba Jamal =

Ghanaian politician

Hon. Baba Jamal

Member of the Ghana Parliament for Ayawaso East
- Preceded by: Naser Toure Mahama
- Majority: National Democratic Congress (Ghana)

Member of Ghana Parliament Akwatia
- In office 7 January 2013 – 6 January 2017
- President: John Mahama
- Preceded by: Kofi Asare
- Succeeded by: Mercy Adu-Gyamfi

Ghana High Commissioner in Nigeria
- President: John Mahama
- Preceded by: Rashid Bawa
- Succeeded by: Baba Sadiq Abdulai Abu

Personal details
- Born: Mohammed Baba Jamal Ahmed; 7 May 1969 (age 57) Akwatia, Ghana
- Party: National Democratic Congress
- Children: 5
- Education: University of Ghana
- Occupation: Lawyer
- Profession: Manager director

Mohammed Baba Jamal Ahmed (born 7 May 1969) is a Ghanaian politician and a member of the National Democratic Congress (Ghana). He was a member of the 6th Parliament for Akwatia Constituency. He served as the deputy minister-designate for Local Government and Rural Development under the John Mahama administration.

== Early life and education ==
Ahmed was born in 1969 at Akwatia in the Eastern region of Ghana. He holds an MPhil in International Politics and a degree in law from the University of Ghana.

== Career ==
Ahmed worked as the managing director of Meeme Business venture in Akwatia. And also served as the deputy general secretary of the National Democratic Congress. He was called to the Bar in 2015.

== Politics ==
On 7 December 2012, Ahmed won the parliamentary seat for Akwatia constituency for the first time, on the ticket of the National Democratic Congress in the 2012 Ghanaian General Elections obtaining 50.44% of the total valid votes cast.

He lost the seat to Mercy Ama Sey in the 2016 General Elections after he polled 15,905 votes while Mercy Ama Sey garnered 21,433 of the total valid votes cast.

== Personal life. ==
Ahmed is a Muslim. He is married with five children.
