= Nima market =

Nima market known locally as Kasoa Mamudu is a major commercial market in Nima in the Greater Accra Region of Ghana. It is open everyday but the main market day is Wednesday when fresh produce comes to the market from local farms and villages all over the country.
