= Ayawaso East =

Ghana parliament constituency

- constituency for the Parliament of Ghana
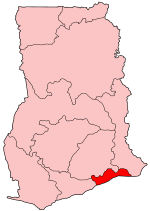
- District: Accra Metropolitan Area
- Region: Greater Accra Region of Ghana

Current constituency
- MP: Baba Jamal

Ayawaso East is one of the constituencies represented in the Parliament of Ghana. It elects one Member of Parliament (MP) by the first past the post system of election. The Ayawaso East constituency is located in the Accra Metropolitan Area of the Greater Accra Region of Ghana. It covers suburbs such as Nima, Maamobi, Accra New Town and adjoining communities.

== Boundaries ==
The seat is located entirely within the Accra Metropolitan Area of the Greater Accra Region of Ghana.

== Members of Parliament ==
First elected	Member	Party
Ayawaso
1969	Ibrahim Cudjoe Quaye	Progress Party
1979	Mohammed Farl	People's National Party
Ayawaso East
1992	Yahaya Seidu	National Democratic Congress
1996	Farouk Braimah	National Democratic Congress
2000	Mustapha Ahmed	National Democratic Congress
2012	Naser Toure Mahama	National Democratic Congress
2026	Baba Jamal	National Democratic Congress

== Elections ==
2026 By-election: Ayawaso East
Party	Candidate	Votes	%	±%
NDC	Baba Jamal	10,884	64.30	−6.55
NPP	Baba Ali Yussif	4,009	23.68	−18.01
Independent	Umar Sanda Mohammed	1,885	11.14	—
Independent	David Akonor	107	0.63	—
Liberal Party of Ghana	Ibrahim Iddrisu	43	0.25	—
Majority		6,875	40.62	−30.23
Turnout		—	—	—
Registered electors		—		—

2024 Ghanaian general election: Ayawaso East
Party	Candidate	Votes	%	±%
NDC	Naser Toure Mahama	22,139	70.85	
NPP	Zak Rahman	9,110	29.15	
Majority		13,029	+41.70	
Turnout		32,005		—
Registered electors				

2020 Ghanaian general election: Ayawaso East
Party	Candidate	Votes	%	±%
NDC	Naser Toure Mahama	23,583	61.18	
NPP	Peter Mireku Kwame Antwi	14,966	38.82	
Majority		8,617	22.36	
Turnout				—
Registered electors				

2016 Ghanaian general election: Ayawaso East
Party	Candidate	Votes	%	±%
NDC	Naser Toure Mahama	23,407	62.10	
NPP	Peter Mireku Kwame Antwi	13,599	36.08	
PPP	Mohammed Ibrahim Bilal	438	1.16	
CPP	Abdul Ganiyu Shaibu	174	0.46	
People's National Convention	Alhassan Abubakari	72	0.19	
Majority		9,808	26.02	
Turnout		37,878	67.5	—
Registered electors		56,105		

2012 Ghanaian general election: Ayawaso East
Party	Candidate	Votes	%	±%
NDC	Naser Toure Mahama	26,647	65.44	
NPP	Mohammed Baba	13,887	34.10	
CPP	Adoley Addo	47	0.12	
People's National Convention	Alhassan Abubakar Zeba	43	0.11	
Independent	Philip S. Y. Aheto	40	0.10	
PPP	Alhassan A Kamagtey	34	0.08	
NDP	Mohammed Aminu L Dauda	22	0.05	
Majority		12,760	+31.34	
Turnout		41,045	76.69	—
Registered electors		53,521		

2008 Ghanaian parliamentary election: Ayawaso East
Party	Candidate	Votes	%	±%
NDC	Mustapha Ahmed	44,655	57.16	+1.06
NPP	Mohammed Salisu Baba	26,020	33.31	−5.89
Independent	Mohammed Amin Lamptey	3,652	0.0	—
CPP	Amin Abdul Karim Larry	1,754	—	—
People's National Convention	Haruna Bukari Dabre	747	0.76	−3.74
DFP	Bernard Anvuur Billy	593	—	—
Independent	Daniel Danquah	314	—	—
New Vision	Samuel Kwesi Gyasi	0	0.0	—
Majority		42,053	84.6	+67.7
Turnout		85,411	73.9	−11.64
Registered electors		115,454		—

2004 Ghanaian general election: Ayawaso East
Party	Candidate	Votes	%	±%
NDC	Mustapha Ahmed	49,354	56.1	
NPP	Dadda Braimah B	34,453	39.2	
People's National Convention	Abdiel Godly Babaaali	4,095	4.7	
Majority		14,901	16.9	
Turnout		88,606	85.54	—
Registered electors		103,582		

2000 Ghanaian general election: Ayawaso East
Party	Candidate	Votes	%	±%
NDC	Mustapha Ahmed	29,579	44.77	−8.35
NPP	Kofi Wayo	29,026	43.93	+18.49
People's National Convention	Hajia Damata Sulemana	5,775	8.74	−2.52
National Reform Party	Damata Sulemana	960	1.45	—
CPP	Ibrahim Futa	727	1.10	—
United Ghana Movement	Bismark Abdallah Agbagli	0	0.00	—
Majority		553	0.84	−26.54
Turnout		66,492	56.46	−24.00
Registered electors		117,759		

1996 Ghanaian parliamentary election: Ayawaso East
Party	Candidate	Votes	%	±%
NDC	Farouk Braimah	45,605	53.12	
NPP	Yussif Kwame Nkrumah	21,841	25.44	
People's National Convention	Amadu Ibrahim Jebkle	9,669	11.26	
Independent	Abdiel Godly Baba Ali	3,575	4.16	
NCP	Ahmed Nii Nortey	3,397	3.96	
People's Convention Party	Ibrahim Futa	1,766	2.06	
Majority		23,764	27.68	
Turnout		85,853	80.46	—
Registered electors		106,698		

The 1992 parliamentary election was boycotted by the opposition parties.

1992 Ghanaian parliamentary election: Ayawaso East
Party	Candidate	Votes	%	±%
NDC	Yahaya Seidu			
Majority				
Turnout		16,287		—
Registered electors		95,933		

== See also ==
- List of Ghana Parliament constituencies
