= Henry Boakye =

Ghanaian politician

Hon Henry Yiadom Boakye
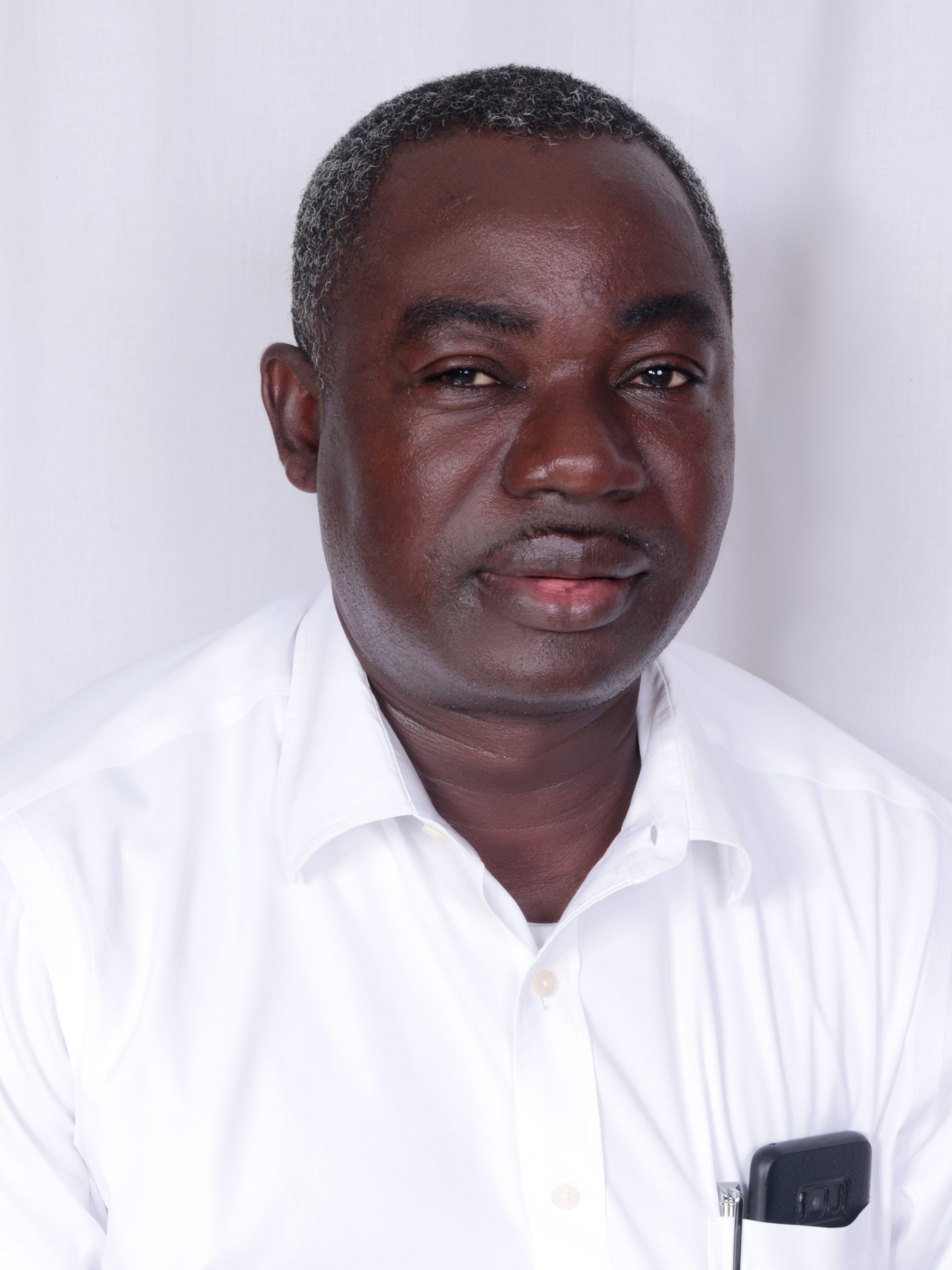

Member of Parliament for Former Member Parliament Akwatia (Ghana parliament constituency)
- In office 7 January 2021 – 6 January 2025
- Preceded by: Mercy Adu-Gyamfi
- Succeeded by: Ernest Kumi

Personal details
- Born: Henry Yiadom Boakye; 12 May 1969 (age 57) Akwatia
- Party: National Democratic Congress
- Occupation: Politician
- Committees: Youth, Sports and Culture Committee, Privileges Committee

Henry Yiadom Boakye (born 12 May 1969) is a Ghanaian politician who served as the Member of Parliament for the Akwatia Constituency in the Seventh Parliament of Ghana.

== Early life and education ==
Boakye was born and hails from Akwatia in the Eastern Region of Ghana. He obtained his Diploma in Engineering in 1989.

== Career ==
Boakye is the Founder and chief executive officer of Okoyo Foundation. He is also working now as the Member of Parliament (MP) for Akwatia Constituency in the Eastern Region of Ghana on the ticket of the National Democratic Congress.

== Political life ==
Boakye contested and won the NDC parliamentary primaries for Akwatia Constituency in the Eastern Region of Ghana. Henry Yiadom Boakye won again in the 2020 Ghanaian general elections on the ticket of the National Democratic Congress with 19,899 votes (51.5%) to join the Eighth (8th) Parliament of the Fourth Republic of Ghana against Ernest Kumi of the New Patriotic Party who had 18,742 votes (48.5).

=== Committees ===
Boakye is a member of the Youth, Sports and Culture Committee. He is also a member of the Privileges Committee of the Eighth (8th) Parliament of the Fourth Republic of Ghana.

== Personal life ==
Boakye is a Christian.
