= Ernest Kumi =

Ghanaian politician (1984–2025)

Hon. Ernest Yaw Kumi MP

Member of Parliament for Akwatia
- In office 7 January 2025 – 7 July 2025
- Preceded by: Henry Yiadom Boakye
- Succeeded by: Bernard Baidoo
- President: John Dramani Mahama
- Vice President: Jane Naana Opoku-Agyemang

Personal details
- Born: 5 December 1984 Ghana
- Died: 7 July 2025 (aged 40) Ghana
- Party: New Patriotic Party
- Education: Regional Maritime University; University of Professional Studies; Mountcrest University College; Ghana Armed Forces Command and Staff College
- Occupation: Politician
- Profession: Public administrator, legal practitioner
- Committees: Lands and Natural Resources Committee; House Committee

Ernest Yaw Kumi (5 December 1984 – 7 July 2025) was a Ghanaian politician who represented the Akwatia constituency in Parliament from January until his death in July 2025. A member of the New Patriotic Party (NPP), he won the closely contested December 2024 election.

== Early life and education ==
Kumi was born in 1984 in Akyem Wenchi in Ghana. He studied at the Regional Maritime University and earned a Bachelor of Science in Ports and Shipping Administration in 2009. He later pursued a Master of Business Administration in Corporate Governance at the University of Professional Studies in 2014. In 2019, he obtained a Bachelor of Laws (LLB) from Mountcrest University College. He also completed a Master of Science in Defence and International Politics from the Ghana Armed Forces Command and Staff College in 2022.

== Career ==
=== Politics ===
Kumi contested and won the Akwatia seat in December 2024, defeating incumbent Henry Yiadom Boakye of the National Democratic Congress (NDC) with approximately 19,269 votes to Boakye's 17,206.

==== Legal challenge ====
Kumi briefly faced a High Court injunction in January 2025 that barred him from being sworn in. He was subsequently convicted of contempt in February 2025, and a bench warrant was issued. His party appealed, and the Supreme Court overturned the ruling in a 4–1 decision in June 2025, restoring his parliamentary status and barring further sentencing.

== Death ==
Kumi died after a brief illness on 7 July 2025, at the age of 40.
