= Naser Toure Mahama =

Ghanaian politician (1965–2026)

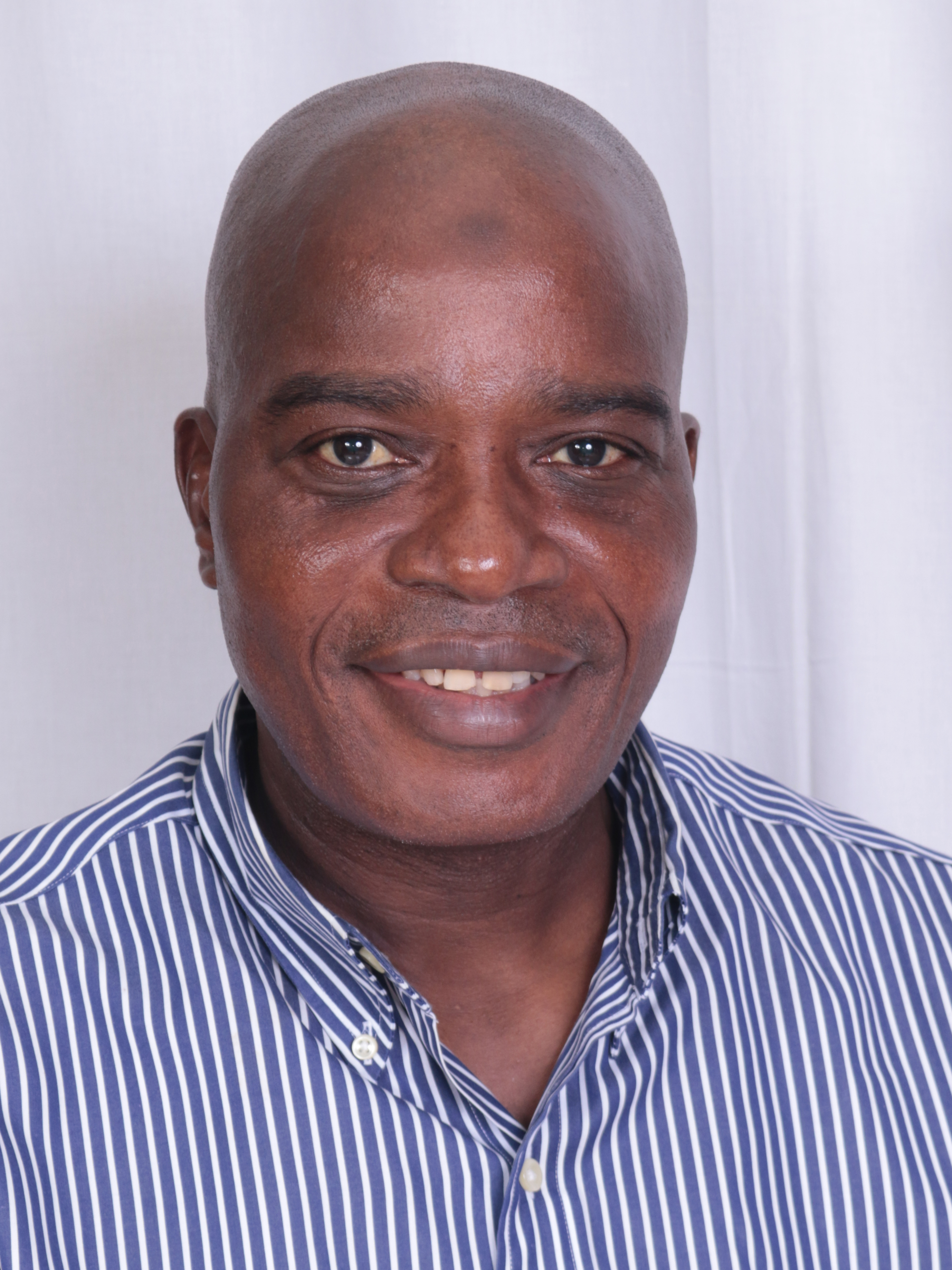

Member of the Ghana Parliament for Ayawaso East
- In office 2012 – 4 January 2026

Personal details
- Born: 17 March 1965 Nima, Accra, Ghana
- Died: 4 January 2026 (aged 60) Accra, Ghana
- Party: National Democratic Congress
- Children: 2
- Education: Central University, GIMPA
- Occupation: Politician
- Profession: Businessman

Naser Toure Mahama (17 March 1965 – 4 January 2026) was a Ghanaian politician who was a member of the Seventh Parliament of the Fourth Republic of Ghana, representing the Ayawaso East Constituency in the Greater Accra Region on the ticket of the National Democratic Congress. He was a member of the 9th parliament of the Republic of Ghana.

== Early life and education ==
Mahama was born on 17 March 1965. He hailed from Nima, a town in the Greater Accra Region of Ghana. He went to the West Africa Senior High School. He entered Central University College, Ghana and obtained his Bachelor of Science degree in marketing in 1987. He obtained his Diploma in Governance from Ghana Institute of Management and Public Administration (GIMPA) and Master of Business Administration (MBA) from Doshisha University.

== Politics ==
Mahama was a member of the National Democratic Congress (NDC). In 2012, he contested the Ayawaso East seat on the ticket of the NDC sixth parliament of the fourth republic and won.

Mahama won the Parliamentary seat for Ayawaso East in the 2024 general election with a total of 22,139 (70.85%).

== Employment ==
- Managing director, Aminasei Oil Company, Accra(1993–2011)
- OTA Forex Bureau, Accra (2001–2003)
- Member of Parliament (7 January 2013–20??; 2nd term)
- Varied profession

== Personal life and death ==
Mahama was a Muslim. He was married to Hajia Amina Adam with two children.

Mahama died in Accra on 4 January 2026, at the age of 60.
