= Bernard Baidoo =

Ghanaian politician

Bernard Bediako Baidoo

Member of the Ghana Parliament for Akwatia
- Incumbent
- Assumed office September 2025
- Preceded by: Ernest Kumi
- Majority: 2,964

Personal details
- Party: National Democratic Congress
- Profession: Lawyer

Bernard Bediako Baidoo is a Ghanaian lawyer and politician. He is the Member of Parliament for Akwatia in the Eastern Region of Ghana.

== Politics ==
Prior to becoming the MP for Akwatia, Baidoo was the secretary for the National Democratic Congress (NDC) in the region. He was on the legal team of the NDC which challenged the result of the 2024 Ghanaian general election in Akwatia constituency.

Following the death of Ernest Kumi of the New Patriotic Party (NPP) on 7 July 2025, the seat became vacant. The Electoral Commission of Ghana conducted a by-election on 2 September 2025 and Baidoo contested and won the seat for the NDC.
