= Akwatia (Ghana parliament constituency) =

Constituency in the Eastern region of Ghana

- constituency for the Parliament of Ghana
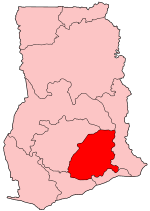
- District: Denkyembour District
- Region: Eastern Region of Ghana

Current constituency
- Party: National Democratic Congress
- MP: Bernard Baidoo

Akwatia is one of the constituencies represented in the Parliament of Ghana. It elects one Member of Parliament (MP) by the first past the post system of election. Akwatia is located in the Denkyembour district of the Eastern Region of Ghana.

== Boundaries ==
The constituency is located within the Denkyembour District of the Eastern Region of Ghana.

== Members of Parliament ==
First elected	Member	Party
1992	Gilbert Kwasi Agyei	National Democratic Congress
1996	Mohammed Erzuah Siam	National Democratic Congress
2000	Kinston Akomeng Kissi	New Patriotic Party
2008	Kofi Asare	New Patriotic Party
2012	Baba Jamal	National Democratic Congress
2016	Mercy Adu-Gyamfi	New Patriotic Party
2020	Henry Boakye	National Democratic Congress
2024	Ernest Kumi	New Patriotic Party
2025	Bernard Baidoo	National Democratic Congress

== Elections ==
A by-election was held on 2 September 2025 following the death of the incumbent MP, Ernest Kumi of the NPP. The seat was won by Bernard Baidoo of the NDC. The NPP thus lost this seat.

2025 by-election: Akwatia
Party	Candidate	Votes	%	±%
NDC	Bernard Baidoo	18,199	54.30	+17.13
NPP	Solomon Asumadu	15,235	45.46	−7.37
Liberal Party of Ghana	Patrick Owusu	82	0.24	—
Majority		2,964	8.84	+3.24
Turnout		33,819		—
Registered electors				—

The result of the 2024 election in this constituency was contested. In February 2025, Kumi defied an interim injunction by the Koforidua High Court barring him from being sworn-in as MP for Akwatia and was found to be in contempt of the court. A warrant was issued for his arrest. This conviction was overturned by the Supreme Court of Ghana in June 2025. Kumi however died suddenly in July 2025.

2024 Ghanaian general election: Akwatia
Party	Candidate	Votes	%	±%
NPP	Ernest Yaw Kumi	19,269	52.83	+4.33
NDC	Henry Yiadom Boakye	17,206	47.17	−4.33
Majority		2,063	5.66	+2.66
Turnout		36,769		—
Registered electors				

2020 Ghanaian general election: Akwatia
Party	Candidate	Votes	%	±%
NDC	Henry Yiadom Boakye	19,899	51.50	+6.05
NPP	Ernest Yaw Kumi	18,742	48.50	−8.71
Majority		1,157	3.00	−8.76
Turnout				—
Registered electors				

2016 Ghanaian general election: Akwatia
Party	Candidate	Votes	%	±%
NPP	Mercy Adu-Gyamfi	21,433	57.21	+7.92
NDC	Mohammed Baba Jamal Ahmed	15,905	45.45	−5.26
CPP	Joyce Sakyi	127	0.34	
Majority		5,528	11.76	
Turnout				—
Registered electors				

2012 Ghanaian general election: Akwatia
Party	Candidate	Votes	%	±%
NDC	Baba Jamal Mohammed Ahmed	20,308	50.71	
NPP	Kofi Asare	19,737	49.29	
PPP	Felix Seth Larbi			
Majority				
Turnout				—
Registered electors				

The 2008 parliamentary election was rerun in 6 polling stations on 18 August 2009. It was won by the NPP candidate.

2008 Ghanaian parliamentary election: Akwatia
Party	Candidate	Votes	%	±%
NPP	Kofi Asare	17,900	50.13	−2.07
NDC	Baba Jamal Mohammed Ahmed	15,860	44.42	−2.68
Independent	Samuel Abrokwa	1,835	5.14	—
CPP	Samuel Agyei	109	0.31	−0.19
Majority		2,040	5.71	+0.61
Turnout		35,758	72.67	−17.53
Registered electors		49,203		—

2004 Ghanaian general election: Akwatia
Party	Candidate	Votes	%	±%
NPP	Kinston Akomeng Kissi	19,386	52.2	+3.3
NDC	Baba Jamal Mohammed Ahmed	17,484	47.1	+1.35
CPP	Samuel Agyei	185	0.5	−0.46
EGLE	Eric Totimeh Nomotey	80	0.2	—
Majority		1,902	5.1	−1.05
Turnout		37,557	90.2	+26.61
Registered electors		41,635		—

2000 Ghanaian general election: Akwatia
Party	Candidate	Votes	%	±%
NPP	Kinston Akomeng Kissi	13,805	48.90	+15.79
NDC	Ahmed Jamal Mohammed	12,069	45.75	−11.46
Independent	Mary Adwoa Buabeng	1,524	5.40	—
National Reform Party	Christian Addo	397	1.41	—
CPP	Samuel K. Agyei	272	0.96	—
People's National Convention	Kwame Kwarkoh Dickson	162	0.57	−3.32
Majority		1,736	6.15	−17.94
Turnout		28,289	63.59	−28.8
Registered electors		44,488		—

1996 Ghanaian general election: Akwatia
Party	Candidate	Votes	%	±%
NDC	Mohammed Erzuah Siam	22,140	57.21	
NPP	Francis A.Y. Agyare-Bray	12,815	33.11	
People's National Convention	Ernest Kwame Ampofo	2,240	5.79	
NCP	Joseph Kofi Asiedu	1,506	3.89	
Majority		9,325	24.09	
Turnout		38,701	92.39	—
Registered electors		41,888		—

The 1992 parliamentary election was boycotted by the opposition parties following the presidential election held a few days earlier.

1992 Ghanaian parliamentary election: Akwatia
Party	Candidate	Votes	%	±%
NDC	Gilbert Kwasi Agyei	9,576		
Majority				
Turnout		9,783		—
Registered electors		31,122		—

== See also ==
- List of Ghana Parliament constituencies
