= Mustapha Ahmed =

Ghanaian politician (1960–2024)

Hon. Mustapha Ahmed

Member of Parliament for Ayawaso East Constituency
- In office 7 January 2009 – 6 January 2013
- President: John Atta Mills; John Mahama
- Succeeded by: Naser Toure Mahama

Member of Parliament for Ayawaso East Constituency
- In office 7 January 2005 – 6 January 2009
- President: John Kufuor

Member of Parliament for Ayawaso East Constituency
- In office 7 January 2001 – 6 January 2005
- President: John Kufuor

Personal details
- Born: 8 June 1960 Bawku, Ghana
- Died: 7 February 2024 (aged 63) Accra, Ghana
- Party: National Democratic Congress
- Education: University of Ghana Medical School
- Profession: Dental Surgeon

Mustapha Ahmed (8 June 1960 – 7 February 2024) was a Ghanaian politician who was a member of the Sixth Parliament of the Fourth Republic of Ghana, representing the Ayawaso North Constituency in the Greater Accra Region on the ticket of the National Democratic Congress.

== Early life and education ==
Ahmed was born on 8 June 1960 in Bawku in the Upper East Region. He hailed from Bawku, a town in the Upper East Region of Ghana. He graduated from University of Ghana Medical School and Dentistry and obtained his bachelor's degree's in Dental Surgery in 1983.

== Career ==
Ahmed was a dental surgeon by profession. He was also a Ghanaian politician.

== Politics ==
Ahmed was a member of the National Democratic Congress (NDC). He became member of the Third Parliament of the Fourth Republic of Ghana representing the Ayawaso East Constituency in January 2001 after winning his poll in the 2000 Ghanaian general election. He was member of the Fourth and Fifth Parliament following his re-election in the 2004 and 2008 Ghanaian general election respectively.

=== 2004 Election ===
Ahmed was elected in the 2004 Ghanaian general elections as the member of parliament for the Ayawaso East constituency in the fourth parliament of the fourth republic of Ghana from 7 January 2005 to 6 January 2009. He was elected with 49,354 votes out of 87,902 total valid votes cast. This was equivalent to 56.1% of the total valid votes cast. He was elected over Abdiel Godly Babaaali of the People's National Convention and Daddah Braimah B. of the New Patriotic Party. These obtained 4,095 votes and 34,453 votes respectively of the total valid votes cast. These were equivalent to 4.7% and 39.2% respectively of the total valid votes cast. Ahmed was elected on the ticket of the National Democratic Congress. His constituency was a part of the 10 constituencies won by the National Democratic Congress in the Greater Accra region in that elections. In all, the National Democratic Congress won a total 128 parliamentary seats in the fourth parliament of the fourth republic of Ghana.

=== 2008 Elections ===
Ahmed was re-elected in the 2008 Ghanaian general elections as the member of parliament for the Ayawaso East constituency in the 5th parliament of the 4th republic of Ghana from 7 January 2009 to 6 January 2013. He was elected with 44,655 votes out of 78,120 total valid votes cast. This was equivalent to 57.16% of the total valid votes cast. He was elected over Mohammed Salisu Baba of the New Patriotic Party, Alhaji Mohammed Muftao of the People's National Convention, Bernard Anvuur Billy of the Democratic Freedom Party, Amin Abdul Karim Larry of the Convention People's Party; and Ahaji Haruna Bubakari Dabre, Daniel Danquah, Mohammed Amin Lamptey and Samuel Kwesi Gyasi – all independent candidates. These obtained 33.31%, 0.98%, 0.76%, 2.25%, 0.0%, 0.4%, 4.67% and 0.49% respectively of the total valid votes cast. Ahmed was re-elected on the ticket of the National Democratic Congress. His constituency was a part of the 18 constituencies won by the National Democratic Congress in the Greater Accra region in those elections. In all, the National Democratic Congress won a total 114 parliamentary seats in the 4th parliament of the 4th republic of Ghana.

== Personal life and death ==
Ahmed was Muslim. He was married with four children. Ahmed died after an illness on 7 February 2024, at the age of 63.
