= Boko alphabet =

Variant of the Latin alphabet

Boko (or bookoo) is a Latin-script alphabet used to write the Hausa language. The first boko alphabet was devised by Europeans in the early 19th century, and developed in the early 20th century by the British and French colonial authorities. It was made the official Hausa alphabet in 1930. Since the 1950s boko has been the main alphabet for Hausa. Arabic script (ajami) is now only used in Islamic schools and for Islamic literature. Since the 1980s, Nigerian boko has been based on the Pan-Nigerian alphabet.

The word boko also refers to non-Islamic (usually western) education ('yan boko = "modern school") or secularism. The word is often described as being a borrowing from English book. However, in 2013, leading Hausa expert Paul Newman published "The Etymology of Hausa Boko", in which he presents the view that boko is in fact a native word meaning "sham, fraud", a reference to "Western learning and writing" being seen as deceitful in comparison to traditional Quranic scholarship.

Boko alphabet
| Letter | A a | B b | Ɓ ɓ | C c | D d | Ɗ ɗ | E e | F f | G g | H h | I i | J j | K k | Ƙ ƙ | L l | M m | N n | O o | R r | S s | Sh sh | T t | Ts ts | U u | W w | Y y | (Ƴ ƴ) | Z z | ʼ |
| IPA | /a/ | /b/ | /ɓ/ | /tʃ/ | /d/ | /ɗ/ | /e/ | /ɸ/ | /ɡ/ | /h/ | /i/ | /(d)ʒ/ | /k/ | /kʼ/ | /l/ | /m/ | /n/ | /o/ | /r/, /ɽ/ | /s/ | /ʃ/ | /t/ | /(t)sʼ/ | /u/ | /w/ | /j/ | /ˀj/ | /z/ | /ʔ/ |

There are some differences in boko used in Niger and Nigeria due to different pronunciations in the French and English languages. The letter ⟨ƴ⟩ is used only in Niger; in Nigeria it is written ⟨ʼy⟩.

Tone, vowel length, and the distinction between /r/ and /ɽ/ (which does not exist for all speakers) are not marked in writing. So, for example, /daɡa/ "from" and /daːɡaː/ "battle" are both written daga.

== See also ==
- Ajami (Arabic alphabet) for Hausa language
- Boko Haram, terrorist group which considers Western education sinful (haram)

== Bibliography ==
- Coulmas, Florian (1999). The Blackwell encyclopedia of writing systems. Wiley-Blackwell. p. 196. ISBN 0-631-21481-X.
- Austin, Peter K. (2008). One Thousand Languages: Living, Endangered, and Lost. University of California Press. p. 64. ISBN 978-0-520-25560-9.
