= Kinston Akomeng Kissi =

Ghanaian politician

Kiston Akomea Kissi

MP for Akwatia
- In office 7 January 2001 – 6 January 2009
- President: John Agyekum Kufour

Personal details
- Born: 4 July 1957 (age 68) Akwatia, Eastern Region
- Party: New Patriotic Party
- Occupation: Politician
- Profession: Farmer

Kiston Akomea Kissi (born 4 July 1957) is a Ghanaian politician and a member of the Third Parliament of the Fourth Republic representing the Akwatia Constituency in the Eastern Region of Ghana.

== Early life and education ==
Kissi was born on 4 July 1957 at Akwatia in the Eastern Region of Ghana.

== Politics ==
Kissi was first elected into Parliament on the ticket of the New Patriotic Party during the December 2000 Ghanaian General elections. He contested with other persons from various political parties but he was chosen over them. Baba Jamal Mohammed Ahmed of the National Democratic Congress had 12,069 of the votes which is equivalent to 42.80%. Mary Adwoa Buabeng an independent candidate emerged third with a total votes of 1,524 which is 5.40%. The National Reform Party's representative Christian Addo polled 397 votes. Samuel Adjei of the Convention People's Party polled 272 which is equivalent to 1.00%. Kwame Kwarkoh Dickson had 162 which is comparable to 0.60% on the ticket of the People's National Convention. He polled 13,805 votes out of the 28,229 valid votes cast, representing 48.90%. In the 2004 elections, he polled 19,386 votes out of the 37,135 valid votes cast, representing 52.20%.

== Career ==
Kissi is a farmer and a former member of Parliament for the Akwatia constituency in the Eastern Region of Ghana. He is also known as a businessman. He was also the board chairman of the Precious Minerals Marketing Company (PMMC) in Ghana.

== Personal life ==
Kissi is a Christian.
