= Mercy Adu-Gyamfi =

Former Ghanaian Parliamentarian

Hon. Mercy Adu Gyamfi Former MP
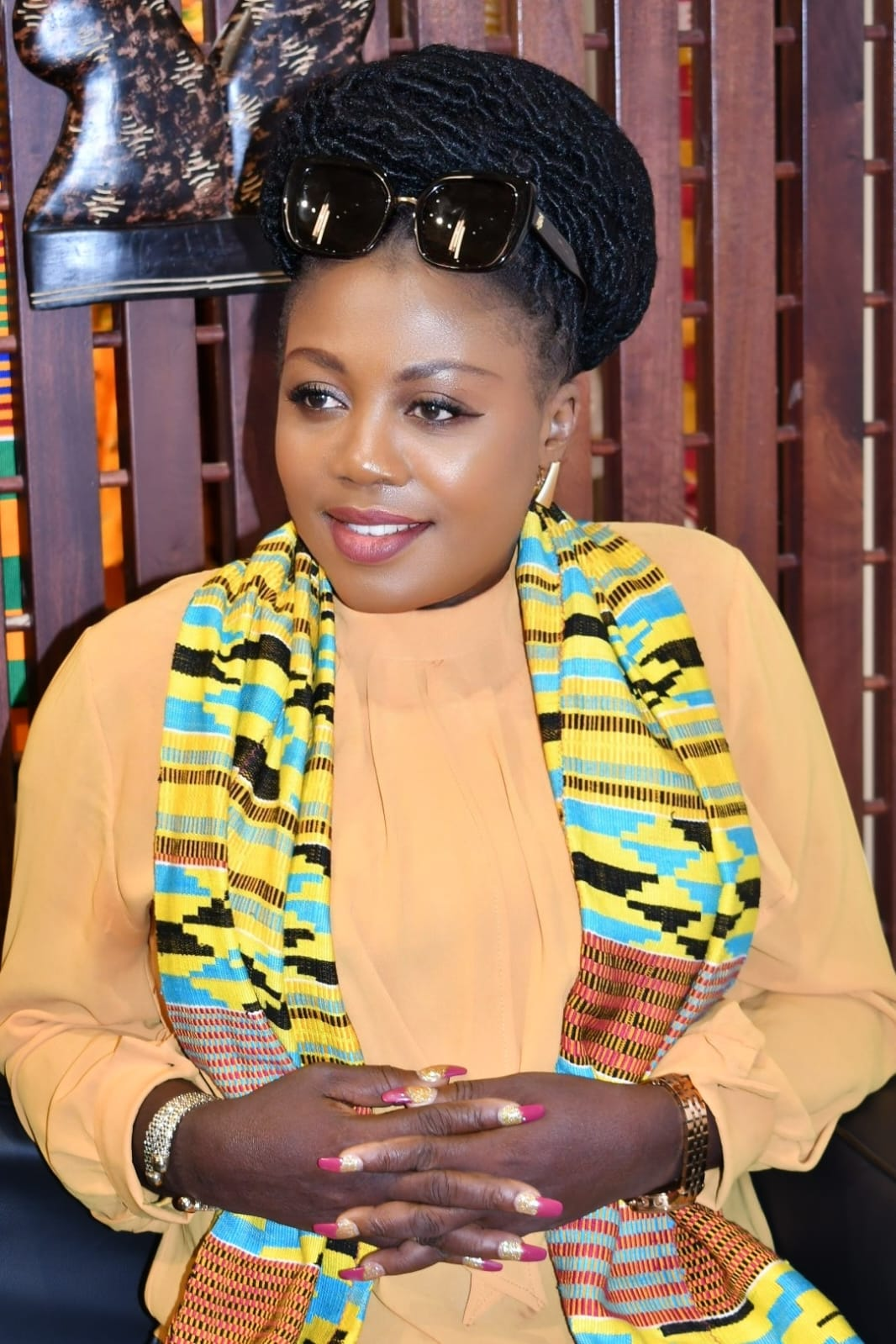

Member of the Ghana Parliament for Akwatia Constituency
- In office January 2017 – January 2021
- Preceded by: Baba Jamal
- Succeeded by: Henry Boakye
- President: Nana Akuffo-Addo

Personal details
- Born: 1 May 1971 (age 55) Akwatia, Ghana
- Party: New Patriotic Party
- Spouse: Yes
- Children: Six
- Education: Presby Middle School, Akwatia, Ghana
- Occupation: Business Person
- Profession: Business Person
- Nickname: Ama Sey

Mercy Adu Gyamfi (born 1 May 1971) is a Ghanaian Parliamentarian, a member of the New Patriotic Party, the majority group in parliament, and a member of the Seventh Parliament of the Fourth Republic of Ghana. She is married with six kids.

== Early life ==
Mercy Adu-Gyamfi comes from Akwatia, in the Eastern Region, of Ghana, and was born on 1 May 1971.

== Education ==
Mrs. Mercy Adu-Gyamfi attended Presby Middle School in Akwatia and in the year 1988, she obtained the Middle School Leaving Certificate. (MSLC).

== Career ==
She is a businesswoman and a hairdresser by profession. She became a member of Ghana's parliament in December 2016, when she won the seat of Akwatia constituency in the Eastern Region. She was a managing director, of Amasey Pharmacy, in Kade, in the Eastern Region. She is a member of some committees in Parliament, she serves on the Committee on Employment and Social Welfare House Committee. She obtained 21,433 votes out of the 37,716 valid votes cast, equivalent to 57,21% over her opponents Baba Jamal Mohammed Ahmed and Joice Sakei.

== Personal life ==
Mercy Adu Gyamfi is married and has six children. She is a Christian and a member of the Church Of Pentecost.
