= Farouk Braimah =

Ghanaian politician

Hon. Farouk Braimah

Member of Parliament for Ayawaso East Constituency
- In office 7 January 1997 – 6 January 2001

Personal details
- Born: 1944
- Died: March 2006 (aged 61–62) 37 Military Hospital, Accra
- Party: National Democratic Congress
- Profession: Politician

Farouk Braimah is a Ghanaian politician and a member of the second Parliament of the fourth Republic of Ghana for the Ayawaso East constituency.

== Early life and education ==
Braimah was 61 years as of 6 March 2006. He was a Ghanaian Politician and a member of parliament for the second parliament of the fourth republic of Ghana for Ayawaso East Constituency. He holds a PH D in Political science. He was also a Deputy Minister for environment, science and technology, Ghana. He was a Strategist by profession.

== Politics ==
Braimah was elected as a member of parliament of the second parliament for the fourth republic of Ghana for the Ayawaso East Constituency on the ticket of the National Democratic Congress during the 1996 Ghanaian general elections. During the 1996 Ghanaian general elections he polled 45,605 votes representing 42.70% of the total valid votes against his opponents; Yussif Kwame Nkrumah of the New Patriotic Party who had 21,841 votes which represent 20.50% of the total votes cast, Amadu Ibrahim Jebkle of People's National Convention also polled 9,669 votes representing 9.10% of the total votes cast, Abdiel Godly Baba Ali an Independent candidate polled 3,575 which represent 3.40% of the total valid votes, Ahmed Nii Nortey of the National Convention Party also polled 3,397 representing 3.20% and Alhaji Ibrahim Futa of the Convention People's Party polling 1,766 representing 1.70% of the total valid votes.

== Death ==
Braimah died in March 2006 at the 37 Military Hospital, Accra.
