= Nima, Accra =

Town in Accra, Ghana

Coordinates: 5°35′N 0°12′W

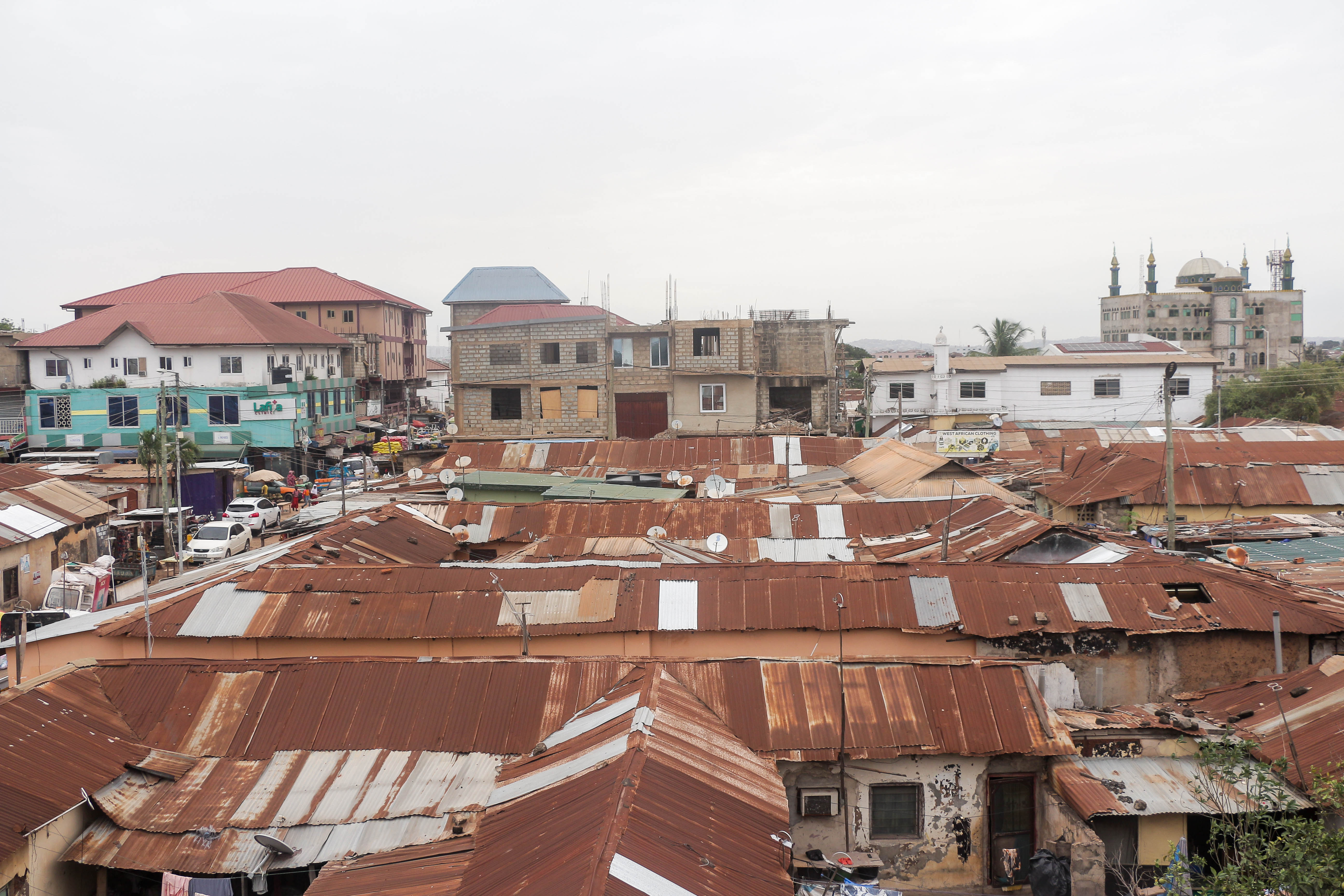
Roofs of Nima

Nima is a Zongo town in the Greater Accra Region of Ghana. The town is popular because of its market – the Nima market.

== Etymology ==
Nima has its etymology from the Ga Language. It means the "city of the King". Nii means King in the Ga language, while the word city in the same language is mann. Alternatively, Nima may be a reference to the Arabic word Ni'ma, which means blessings.

== History ==
Nima is the largest and one of the oldest Zongo communities in Ghana with origins as far back as 1836. One of the popular origin stories is that the area was acquired from the Osus by the Odoi Kwaos with intentions to farm. Some time later, though, it is believed the Odoi Kwaos offered the land to Malam Amadu Futa to be used as a settlement. The Futa family are, therefore, considered to be the founders of Nima. The settlement is often referred to as one-half of the twin community, Mamobi-Nima, though it is mostly used to refer to the two adjoining towns.

== Culture ==
Nima is a Muslim-dominated area. Like most Zongo communities, though, it exhibits great diversity in religion and ethnicity (dominated by the Dogon people of Mali, also known as Kaado or kardo). One of the largest churches, The Church of Pentecost, is located along the main highway.

Cultural practices such as tea drinking is really popular in the Nima community. Locally brewed herbal tea called "ataya" is the go-to beverage for folks within the community.

== Economy ==
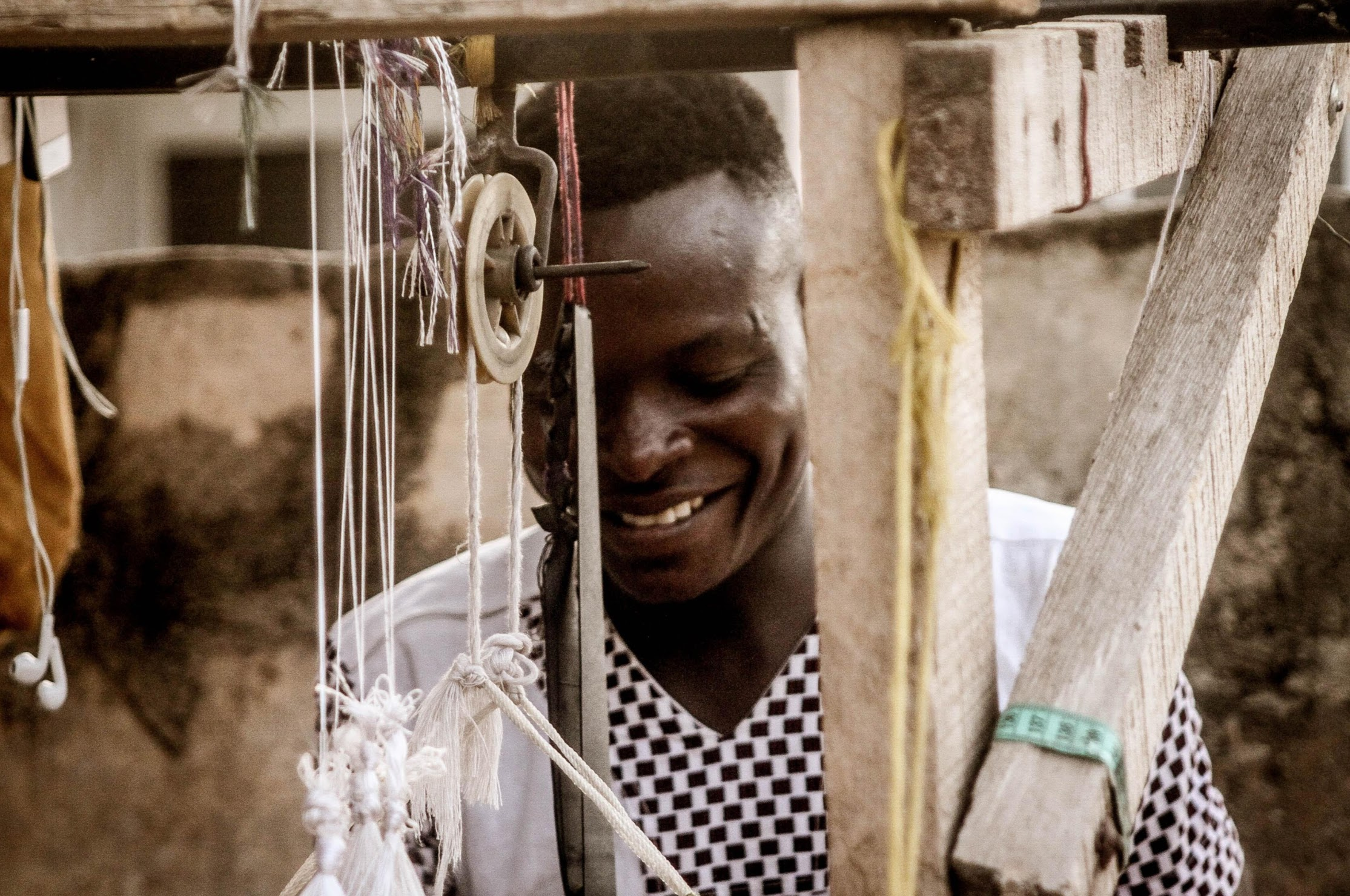
A weaver at Nima.

Nima developed as a settlement for traders from the northern regions of Ghana and from neighbouring countries such as Togo and Burkina Faso. It is a major trading hub. The Nima Market, known locally as Kasoa Mamudu, is one of the largest and busiest markets in Accra; it's located along the Al-Waleed Bin Talal Highway. Wednesdays are market days, and the market trades in cereals, grains, vegetables, spices, and livestock. Some vendors deal in traditional medicines. The market offers fowl with unique or single coloring for special rites. Forex traders and black market sellers operate near the market.

Another market dealing mostly in vegetables is located two kilometres (1 mi) away in the twin town of Mamobi.

== Shooting ==
On 18 January 2022, a violent clash took place between two rival groups at Nima and Mamobi. Members of the gangs attacked with guns, cutlasses, and clubs. Some seven people were arrested by the Ghana Police Service. GHS20,000 bounty were placed on the heads of the two gang leaders: Kumordzi and Bombom and were declared wanted. Farouk Daudi was arrested for his involvement in the clash.

== Notables ==
- Mohammed Kudus
