= Roads in Ghana =

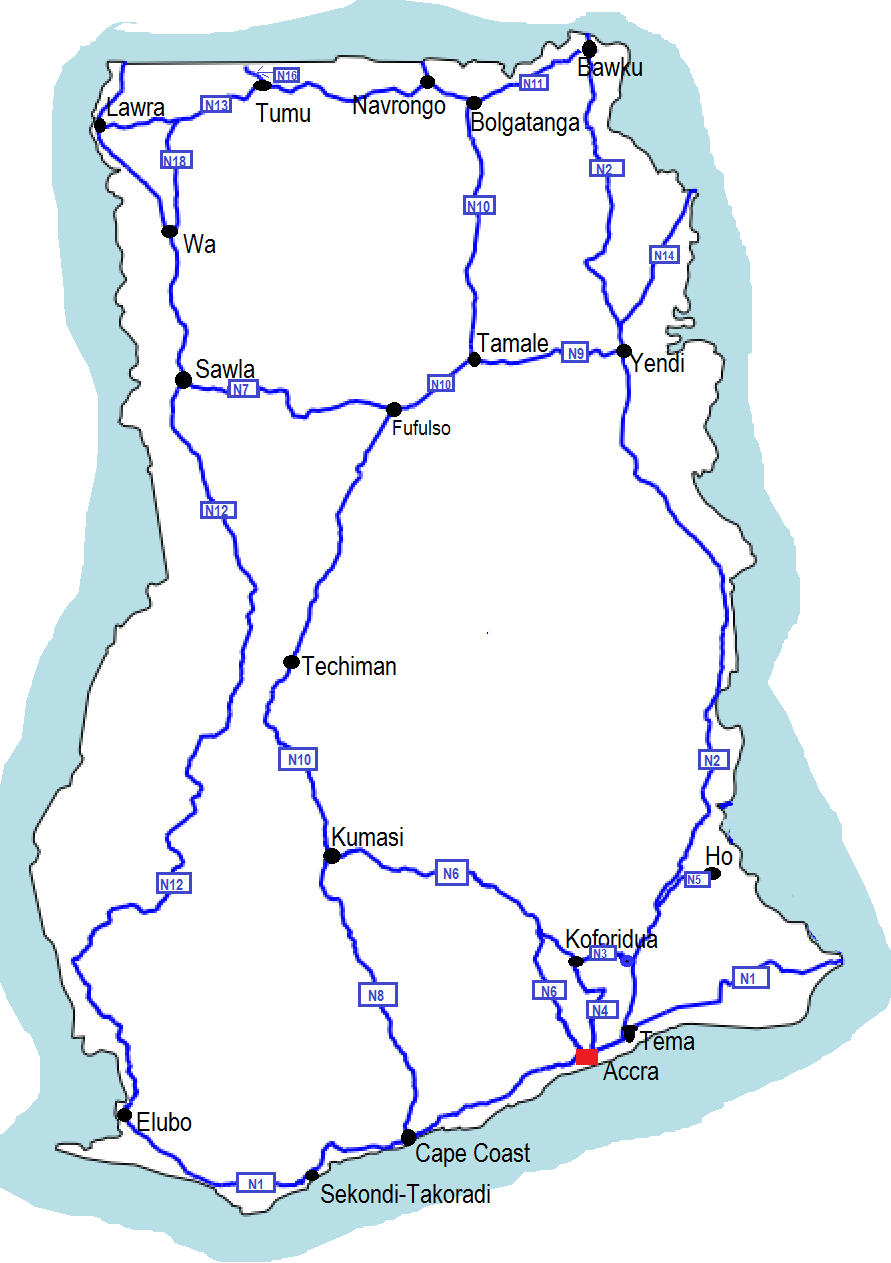
National highway network

Roads in Ghana form a network of varied quality and capacity. Responsibility for the road network differs between trunk and non-trunk routes. Trunk roads, which are the most important roads, are administered by the Ghana Highway Authority, which was established in 1974 to develop the trunk road network. Ghana has a total road network of 94,203 km of which 27% is paved with 73% unpaved.

The Department of Feeder Roads is responsible for the construction and maintenance of feeder roads in Ghana, while responsibility for urban roads lies with the Department of Urban Roads. In the 18th and 19th centuries, the Ashanti Empire constructed a complex network of roads to link Kumasi with their territories in modern Ghana. For John Thornton, these roads improved transportation across the region by the 19th century.

Road distances are shown in kilometers and Ghana speed limits are indicated in kilometers per hour (km/h). Generally, speed limits range from 30 to 50 km/h (20 to 30 mph) in urban areas, 80 km/h (50 mph) on Regional and Inter-Regional highways (R and IR routes), 90 km/h (55 mph) on National highways (N routes) and 100 km/h (60 mph) on motorways.

== Classification ==
Trunk roads in Ghana are classified as N for National routes, R for Regional routes, and IR for Inter-Regional routes. Each road is given a number which is combined with the prefix, for example N1, R40 and IR11, although their informal or traditional names may still be used or heard occasionally: for instance the Accra - Kumasi Road (now part of the N6).

=== National routes ===
National routes in Ghana are a class of roads and highways that form the trunk routes between major urban centers. Together, they form the backbone of the road system. This category of roads is designated with the letter N followed by a number indicating the specific route. Odd-numbered routes run east to west, while even-numbered routes run north to south.

==== List of routes ====
AS Ashanti Region, BA Brong-Ahafo Region, CR Central Region, ER Eastern Region, GR Greater Accra Region, NR Northern Region, UE Upper East Region, UW Upper West Region, VR Volta Region, WR Western Region

Number	Route	Length (km)	Length (mi)
N1	Elubo (N12) - Mpataba (R19) - Esiama (R88) - Abra (R86) - Agona (R84) - Sekondi-Takoradi - Cape Coast (R82) - Yamoransa (N8) - Saltpond (R80) - Mankessim (IR1) - Apam Junction (R62) - Ojobi Junction (R17) - Winneba (IR2) - Nyanyano (R15) - Accra (N6) - Tetteh Quarshie Interchange, Accra (N4), Dawhenya (R13) - Sege (R18) - Kase (R11) - Dabala (R16) - Akatsi (R12, R14) - Denu (R11) - Aflao	540	340
N2	Tema (N1) - Asikuma - Kpong (N3) - Adomi (N5) - Have-Etoe (R26) - Fume (R28) - Golokwati (IR7) - Hohoe (R10) - Jasikan (R23) - Kadjebi (R25) - Nkwanta (R27) - Nakpayili (R202) - Bimbila (R29) - Pusuga (N9) - Yendi (R201, R204) - Sakpeigu (N14) - Gushiegu (R107, R110) - Nyakpanduri (IR11) - Bawku (N11) - Kulungugu	640	400
N3	Kpong (N2) - Somanya (R30) - Oterkpalu (IR3) - Koforidua (R42)	40	25
N4	Accra (N1) - Adenta (R40) - Mamfe (R22) - Koforidua (R42) - Asokore (R41) - Bunso (N6, R32)	110	68
N5	Adome (N2) - Juapong - Ho (R10, R26, R55)	40	25
N6	Accra (N1) - Nsawam (IR1) - Suhum (R41) - Apedwa (R60) - Bunso (N4) - Anyinam (R61) - Nkawkaw (IR3) - Juaso (IR2) - Konongo (R76) - Bomfa (R87) - Ejisu (R104) - Kumasi (IR4, IR5, N10, R108, R52)	250	160
N7	Sawla (N12) - Larabanga - Fufulsu (N10)	140	87
N8	Yamoransa (N1) - Dunkwa - Fomena - Bekwai - Kumasi (N6, N10)	170	110
N9	Tamale (N10) - Jimle - Yendi (N2)	100	62
N10	Kumasi (N6, N8)- Techiman - Tamale (N9) - Bolgatanga (N11) - Paga	610	380
N11	Bolgatanga (N10) - Zebilla - Bawku (N2) - Bimpiela	100	62
N12	Elubo (N1) - Enchi - Sunyani - Bamboi - Wa - Lawra - Hamile	670	420
N13	Lawra - Tumu - Navrongo	180	110
N14	Sakpeigu - Cheperoni - Yawgu	120	75
N16	Tumu - Kapulima	20	12
N18	Wa - Han	79	49

=== Inter-regional routes ===
Inter-Regional routes, designated with the prefix IR, connect major settlements and regional capitals across regional borders. Running east to west are odd-numbered routes, while north-south routes are even-numbered.

==== List of routes ====
AS Ashanti Region, BA Brong-Ahafo Region, CR Central Region, ER Eastern Region, GR Greater Accra Region, NR Northern Region, UE Upper East Region, UW Upper West Region, VR Volta Region, WR Western Region

Number	Route
IR1	Aburi, ER - Mankessim, CR
IR2	Winneba, CR - Juaso, AS
IR3	Obuasi, AS - Oterkpalu, ER
IR4	Kumasi, AS - Chambuligu, NR
IR5	Osei Kojokrom, WR - Abuakwa, AS
IR6	Agona, WR - Ayanfuri, CR
IR7	Kame, VR - Nkonsia, ER
IR8	Dunkwa, CR - Kyeremaso, BA
IR9	Prang, BA - Berekum, BA
IR10	Busunu, NR - Chuchuliga, UE
IR11	Yawgu, NR - Pala, UW
IR12	Elubo, WR - Hamile, UWR

=== Regional routes ===
Regional routes are a mix of primary and secondary routes that link major settlements and serve as feeder roads to the National route network. Major regional routes are designated with the letter R followed by a two-digit number, while Minor regional routes are designated with the letter R followed by a three-digit number.

Designation as a Regional route does not imply that a road is maintained by a regional authority; some parts of the Regional route network are maintained by the Ghana Highway Authority, and parts in cities and towns may be ordinary streets maintained by the Department of Urban Roads and the Department of Feeder Roads. Regional routes vary in quality and size from dirt roads to multi-lane paved highways.

==== Major regional routes ====
Major regional routes are the second category of road in the Ghana trunk road network. They serve as feeder roads to the national route network, and are the primary trunk roads in areas where there is no national route.

===== List of routes =====
AS Ashanti Region, BA Brong-Ahafo Region, CR Central Region, ER Eastern Region, GR Greater Accra Region, NR Northern Region, UE Upper East Region, UW Upper West Region, VR Volta Region, WR Western Region

Number	Route
R10	Denu, VR – Ho, VR
R11	Kasseh, VR – Denu, VR
R12	Akatsi, VR – Akanu, VR
R13	Akplabanya, GR - Dodowa, GR
R14	Akatsi, VR – Ziope, VR
R15	Nyanyano, CR – Bawjiase, CR
R16	Srogbe, VR – Dabala, VR
R17	Ojobi, CR – Senya-Beraku, CT
R18	Akplabanya - Battor
R19	Mpataba, WR – Jewi Wharf, WR
R20	Ashaiman - Dodowa
R21	Atimpoku, ER – Akosombo, ER
R22	Doryum - Mamfe
R23	Jasikan, VR – Worawora, VR
R24	Frankadua, VR – Adidome, VR
R25	Kadjebi, VR – Apesokubi, VR
R26	Have, VR – Borae, VR
R27	Nkwanta, WR – Dambai, NR
R28	Fume, VR – Sogakope, VR
R29	Zabzugu, NR - Salaga, NR
R30	Adukrom, WR – Konongo-Odumase, AS
R31	Seems not to exist
R32	Begoro, ER – Dominase, ER
R33	Seems not to exist
R34	Begoro - Agogo
R35	Seems not to exist
R36	New Edubiase, AS – Saponso, AS
R37	Seems not to exist
R38	Agyenkwaso, AS - Gyadem, AS
R39	Seems not to exist
R40	Accra, GR - Somanya, ER
R41	Effiduase - Assinmanso
R42	Mamfe, ER – Nkurakan, ER
R43	Juansa, AS – Offinso, AS
R44	Agogo, AS – Jema, BA
R45	Aframso, AS – Sekyedumase, AS
R46	Seems not to exist
R47	Kwadwokrom, BA – Nkoranza, BA
R48	Seems not to exist
R49	Kpandae, NR – Salaga, NR
R50	Ho, VR – Dzelukope, VR
R52	Kumasi, AS – New Offinso, AS
R54	Ohiyeanisa, WR – Drobo, BA
R60	Apedwa, ER – Bunso, ER
R61	Anyinam, ER – Kade, ER
R62	Apam, CR – Kade, ER
R63	Tepa, BA – Goase, BA
R64	Adaiso, ER – Obogu, AS
R65	Mankraso, AS – Tepa, AS
R66	Bechem, BA – Akumadan, AS
R68	Berekum, BA – Nkawkaw, BA
R70	Golokwati, VR – Hohoe, VR
R71	Techiman, BA – Buoku, BA
R72	Ekyiaenfokrom, ER – New Kyease, ER
R74	Surukrom, AS – Kwame Danso, BA
R76	Konongo, AS – Atebubu, BA
R80	Saltpond, CR – Abura Dunkwa, CR
R81	Assin Foso, CR – Insu, WR
R82	Cape Coast, CR – Twifo Praso, CR
R83	Asubua, CR – Dunkwa, CR
R84	Discove, WR – Agona, WR
R85	Busuta, WR – Busua, WR
R86	Princess Town, WR – Abra, WR
R87	Bomfa, AS – Bekwai, AS
R88	Esiama, WR – Anibil, WR
R90	Tamale, NR – Karaga, NR
R91	Nanton, NR – Kunbungu, NR
R92	Tamale, NR – Mankarigu, NR
R93	Wenchi, BA – Sampa, WR
R94	Menji, BA – Banda Nkwanta, NR

==== Minor regional routes ====
Minor Regional Routes are the third category of road in the Ghana trunk road network. They serve as feeder roads connecting smaller towns to the national and major regional route network.

===== List of routes =====
AS Ashanti Region, BA Brong-Ahafo Region, CR Central Region, ER Eastern Region, GR Greater Accra Region, NR Northern Region, UE Upper East Region, UW Upper West Region, VR Volta Region, WR Western Region

Number	Route
R100	Atobiase, WR – Nyenase, CR
R101	Essamam, WR – Tarkwa, WR
R103	Obuasi, AS – Apowa, WR
R104	Bekwai, AS – Kumawu, AS
R105	Awiankwanta, AS – Adumasa, AS
R106	Kumasi, AS – Abono, AS
R107	Gushiegu, NR – Pigu, NR
R108	Manso Nkwanta, AS – Toase, AS
R109	Tamale, NR – Daboya, NR
R110	Gushiegu, NR – Nalerigu, NR
R113	Naga, UE – Wiagayisoaso, UE
R114	Bolgatanga, UE – Feo, UE
R116	Wulugu, NR – Navrongo, UE
R121	Tarkwa, WR – Akyemfo, WR
R122	Samreboi, WR – Asankragwa, WR
R123	Bawdie, WR – Enchi, WR
R124	Asankragwa, WR – Humjibre, WR
R125	Diaso, WR – Juabeso, WR
R126	Dadieso, WR – Buako, WR
R127	Asawinso, WR – Sefwi Bekwai, WR
R128	Hwidiem, BA – Atroni, BA
R129	Kramokrom, WR – New Debiso, WR
R131	Tumu, UW – Hamile, UW
R132	Nadowli, UW – Nandom, UW
R158	Winkogo, UE – Nangodi, UE
R180	Yala, UW – Wahabu, UW
R181	Sanadema, UE – Fian, UW
R182	Walembele, UW – Tumu, UW
R184	Hian, UW – Gbal, UW
R201	Tatali, NR – Tamale, NR
R202	Ketekrachi, VR – Nakpayili, NR
R204	Yendi, NR – Chereponi, NR

== Signage ==
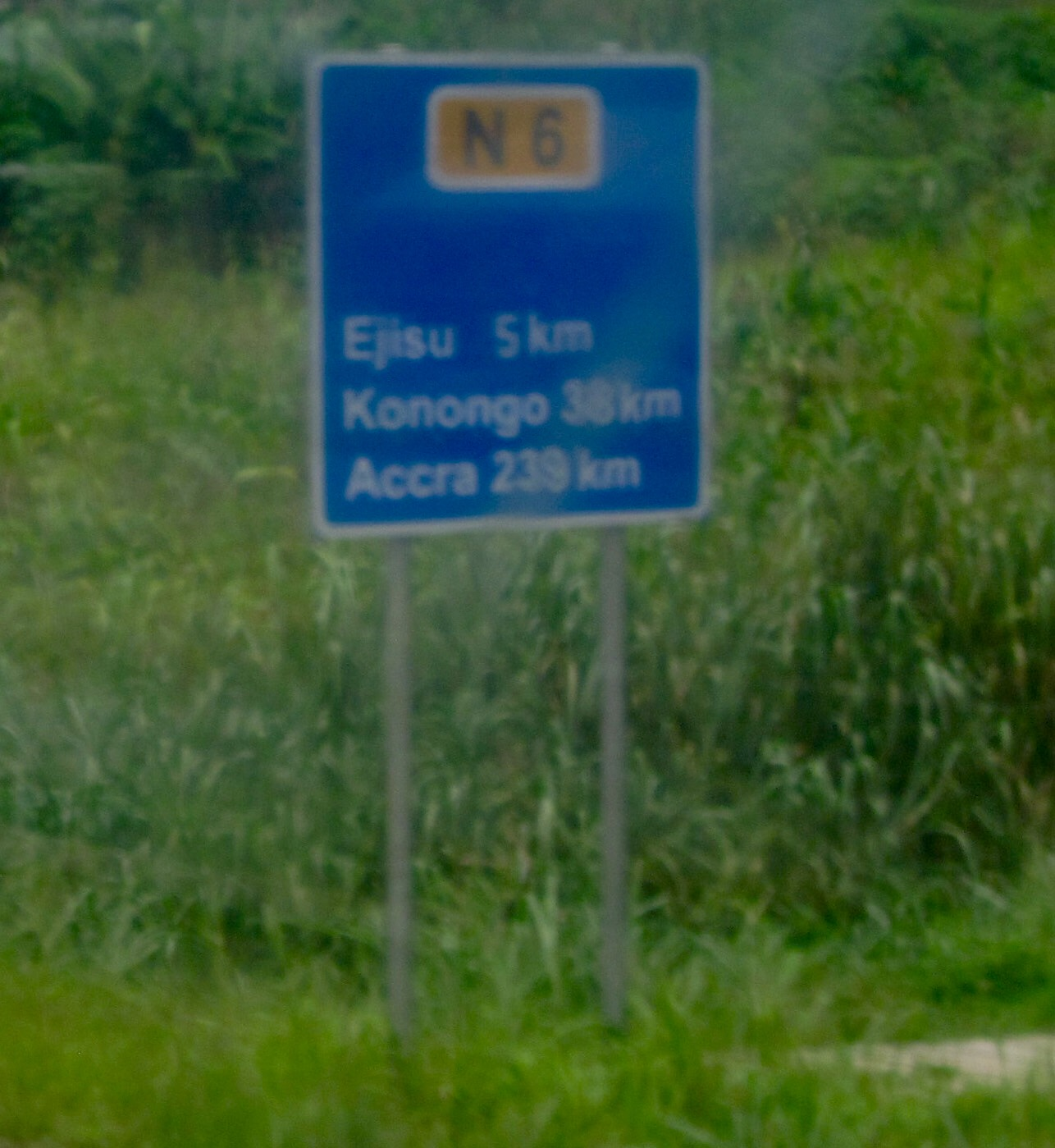
N6 route marker

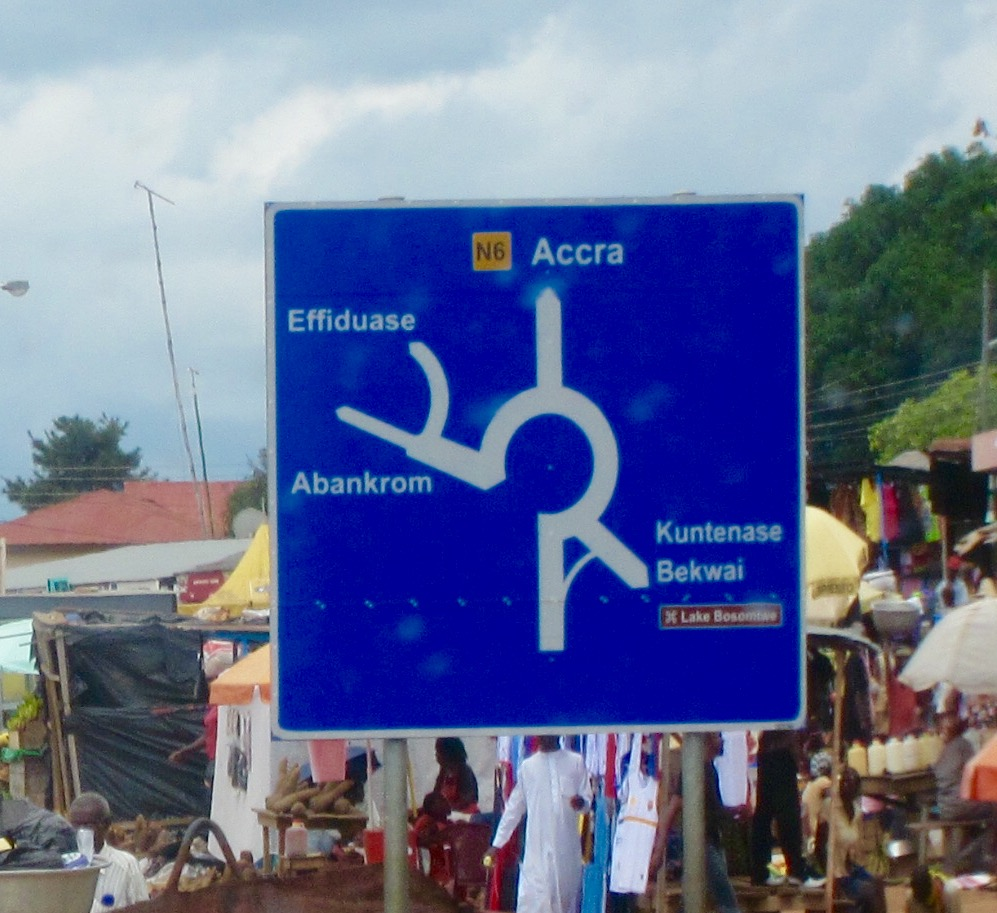
A typical directional sign on a highway in Ghana

Signage on the Ghana network conforms broadly to international norms. All length distances are shown in kilometers, speed is in kilometers per hour, whilst height and width restrictions are shown in meters. Signs may be of an informative, warning or instructional nature. Instructional signs are generally circular, warnings are triangular, and informative signs are rectangular or square. Informative signs, which include directional signs, use white text on a blue background.

== See also ==
- List of road interchanges in Ghana
