= N4 road (Ghana) =

National highway in Ghana

National Highway 4

Route information
- Maintained by Ghana Highways Authority
- Length: 68.35 mi (110.00 km)

Major junctions
- South end: N1 at Tetteh Quarshie Interchange, Accra
- R40 at Adenta; R22 at Mamfe; R42 at Koforidua; R41 near Asokore
- North end: N6 R60 at Bunso

Location
- Country: Ghana
- Regions: Greater Accra, Eastern Region

Highway system
- Ghana Road Network
← N3	→ N5

The N4 or National Highway 4 is a national highway in Ghana that begins at the Tetteh Quarshie Interchange in Accra and runs through Adenta, Koforidua, and Asokore to join the N6, which continues to Kumasi. It serves as an alternate route from Accra to Kumasi, with a total distance of 110 kilometers (68 miles). The route runs through the Greater Accra and Eastern regions of Ghana.

== Route ==
Major towns and cities along the route of the N4 include Madina, Adenta, Aburi, Mamfe, Koforidua, Asokore, and Bunso.

=== Greater Accra Region ===
The N4 begins at the Tetteh Quarshie Interchange in Accra and travels north, running by the University of Ghana at Legon. Continuing north to Madina, the N4 intersects with the R40 near the Madina Police Station and veers slightly northwest toward Oyarifa before entering the Eastern Region. Six footbridges designed for pedestrians to cross the highway between Madina and Adenta were abandoned leading to many deaths and injuries. After a taxi cab hit and killed a female student of the West African Senior High School in front of her school, demonstrations erupted which prompted the Ghana government and the Ministry of Roads and Highways to finally complete them.

=== Eastern Region ===
In the Eastern Region, the N4 continues north to Aburi, where it intersects with the IR1 near the Aburi Botanical Gardens. The route continues north intersecting with the R22 at Mamfe, then turns west through Saforo and Kwamoso before veering northwest at Adawso toward Koforidua. At Koforidua, the N4 intersects with the R42 near the Koforidua Technical University and continues north to Asokore, where it intersects with the R41. From Asokore, the N4 turns northwest through New Tafo before terminating at Bunso, where it intersects with the R60 and N6, which continues north to Kumasi

== See also ==
- Ghana Road Network
- Madina-Adenta footbridges
