= N2 road (Ghana) =

National highway in Ghana

National Highway 2

Route information
- Maintained by Ghana Highways Authority
- Length: 397.68 mi (640.00 km)

Major junctions
- South end: N1 at Tema; 5°41′13.8″N 0°0′52.5″W
- N3 at Kpong; N5 at Adomi; R26 at Have-Etoe; R28 at Fume; IR7 at Golokwati; R10 at Hohoe; R23 at Jasikan; R25 at Kadjebi; R27 at Nkwanta; R202 at Nakpayili; R29 at Bimbila; N9, R201, 204 at Yendi; N14 at Sakpeigu; R107, 1103 at Gushiegu; IR11 at Nakpanduri; N11 at Bawku
- North end: Kulungugu11°9′26.1″N 0°12′7.7″W

Location
- Country: Ghana
- Regions: Greater Accra, Eastern, Volta, Oti, Northern, North East, Upper East
- Major cities: Hohoe, Nkwanta, Bimbila, Gushegu, Nakpanduri, Bawku

Highway system
- Ghana Road Network
← N1	→ N3

The N2 or National Highway 2 is a national highway in Ghana that begins at the Tema Motorway interchange at Tema and runs through Hohoe, Nkwanta, Yendi, and Bawku to the border with Burkina Faso at Kulungugu. It is the main north-south highway in the eastern corridor of the country, with a total distance of 640 kilometres (400 mi). The route runs through the Greater Accra, Eastern, Volta, Oti, Northern, North East Region and Upper East regions of Ghana.

The route links the N1 to the N10.

== Route ==
Major towns and cities along the route of the N2 include Tema, Kpong, Atimpoku, Ho, Hohoe, Nkwanta, Bimbila, Gushiegu, Nakpanduri, Yendi, Bawku.

=== Greater Accra Region ===
The N2 begins at the Tema Motorway interchange where it intersects the N1 as the continuation of the Harbour Road which travels from the Tema Harbour northwards. There has been major upgrade works completed in 2020 converting the roundabout at the end of the Accra-Tema motorway to improve the traffic flow at this very busy junction of the N1 and N2. The N1 forms part of the Trans-Africa Highway. It then proceeds north through the town of Afienya and runs by the western side of the Shai Hills Resource Reserve before entering the Eastern region.

=== Eastern Region ===
In the Eastern region, the route runs north through Kpong where it shares a junction with the N3 and then on to Atimpoku and Senchi before it traverses the Volta Lake via the Adomi Bridge. It then continues through the Adomi village before entering the Volta Region.

=== Volta Region ===
In the Volta Region, the N2 runs through Adomi, where it intersects with the N5 before continuing north. The route briefly crosses back into the Eastern region before re-entering the Volta Region after Asikuma. The N2 continues through Peki, Kpeve and Have-Etoe, where it intersects with the R26. It then turns slightly northeast through Fume, where it intersects with the R28, then runs north through Golokwati to intersect with the IR7. Continuing north, the N2 travels through Hohoe, intersecting the R10 before entering the Oti Region.

=== Oti Region ===
From Jasikan, the N2 intersects with the R23, then on to Kadjebi, where it intersects the R25, and Nkwanta, where it intersects with the R27, before veering northwest to Domanko, where it exits into the Northern region.

=== Northern Region ===
In the Northern Region, the N2 runs north through Nakpayili, where it intersects with the R202, continues northeast through Bimbila, where it intersects with the R29. The route continues northwest to Pusuga before continuing north to Yendi, where it intersects with the N9. The N2 intersects with the R201 and R204 at Yendi as well. From Yendi, the N2 continues north to Sakpeigu, where it intersects with the N14, and runs north through Gushiegu, where it intersects with the R107 and R110.

=== North East Region ===
The N2 heads north out of the Northern Region to Nakpanduri in the North East Region, where it intersects with the IR11 before entering the Upper East region.

=== Upper East Region ===
In the Upper East Region, the N2 runs north through Garu and Bawku, where it intersects with the N11 before continuing on to Kulungugu on the border with Burkina Faso.

== See also ==
- Ghana Road Network
