= N7 road (Ghana) =

National highway in Ghana

National Highway 7

Route information
- Maintained by Ghana Highways Authority
- Length: 140 km (87 mi)

Major junctions
- West end: N12 at Sawla
- East end: N10 at Fufulso

Location
- Country: Ghana

Highway system
- Ghana Road Network
← N6	→ N8

The N7 or National Highway 7 is a national highway in Ghana that begins at Sawla where it intersects N12 and runs east through Larabanga to Fufulso where it also intersects N10 in the Savannah Region. It is also named the Fufulso-Damongo-Sawla Road after the settlements the road crosses. Its construction commenced in 2012.

== See also ==
- Ghana Road Network
