= N6 road (Ghana) =

National highway in Ghana

National Highway 6

Route information
- Maintained by Ghana Highways Authority
- Length: 155.34 mi (250.00 km)

Major junctions
- South end: N1 at Accra
- IR1 at Nsawam; R41 at Suhum; R60 at Apedwa; N4 at Bunso; R61 at Anyinam; IR3 at Nkawkaw; IR2 at Juaso; R76 at Konongo; R87 at Bomfa; R104 at Ejisu
- North end: N10 IR4 IR5 R108 R52 at Kumasi

Location
- Country: Ghana
- Regions: Greater Accra, Eastern Region, Ashanti Region
- Major cities: Accra, Amasaman, Nsawam, Suhum, Apedwa, Bunso, Anyinam, Nkawkaw, Juaso, Konongo, Bomfa, Ejisu, Kumasi

Highway system
- Ghana Road Network
← N5	→ N7

The N6 or National Highway 6 is a national highway in Ghana that begins at the Nsawam road junction off the N1 in Accra and runs through Nsawam, Nkawkaw, and Ejisu to Kumasi, where it meets the N4. At Kumasi, the N6 intersects with the N10, R52, R108, and IR5.

The route, which spans a distance of 250 kilometers (160 miles), serves as an alternate to the N4 from Accra to Kumasi and runs through the Greater Accra, Eastern, and Ashanti regions of Ghana.

== Route ==
Major towns and cities along the route of the N6 include Accra, Amasaman, Nsawam, Suhum, Apedwa, Bunso, Nkawkaw, Juaso, Konongo, Bomfa, Ejisu, Kumasi.

=== Greater Accra Region ===
The N6 begins at the Nasawam Road at the intersection with the N1 in Accra and travels north through Ofankor and Pokuase before entering the Eastern Region.

=== Eastern Region ===
In the Eastern Region, the N6 runs north through Nsawam, where it intersects with the IR1. The route continues north intersecting with the R41 at Suhum and the R60 at Apedwa before joining the N4 at Bunso. From Bunso, the N6 runs northwest through Anyinam, where it intersects with the R61 and continues on to Nkawkaw, where it intersects with the IR3 before entering the Ashanti Region.

=== Ashanti Region ===
The N6 runs west through Breku to Juaso, where it intersects with the IR2 and continues to Konongo. At Konongo, the N6 intersects with the R76, runs west to intersect with the R87 at Bomfa, and continues through Ejisu where it intersects with the R104. The route runs near the Kwame Nkrumah University of Science and Technology campus before entering the city of Kumasi, where it intersects with the N10, IR4, IR5, R108, and R52.

== See also ==
- Ghana Road Network
