= R14 road (Ghana) =

Regional road in Ghana

Regional Highway 14

Route information
- Maintained by Ghana Highways Authority

Major junctions
- South end: N1 at Akatsi; 6°6′24.7″N 0°49′28.6″E
- R12 at Akatsi
- North end: R10 at Ziope; 6°25′5″N 0°44′33.8″E

Location
- Country: Ghana

Highway system
- Ghana Road Network
← R13	→ R15

The R14 or Regional Highway is a highway which runs entirely within the Volta Region of Ghana, linking the Akatsi South District and the Agotime Ziope District. It is also known as the Akatsi-Ziope road.

== Akatsi South District ==
The R14 starts as a junction off the N1 national highway where it branches off on its northern side before bending northwest through the town of Akatsi. It intersects the R12 within Akatsi before heading northwest out of town. It continues through Kopeyia Village and then Wute.

== Agotime Ziope District ==
The R14 continues north into the Agotime Ziope District travelling through Kadzinkor town before arriving at Ziope where it meets the R10 regional highway from Ho to Denu.

== See also ==
- Ghana Road Network
