= R94 road (Ghana) =

Road in Ghana

Regional Highway 94

Route information
- Maintained by Ghana Highways Authority

Major junctions
- South end: Menji
- North end: N12 at Banda Nkwanta

Location
- Country: Ghana

Highway system
- Ghana Road Network

The R94 or Regional Highway 94 is a highway in Ghana that begins at Menji in the Bono Region and ends at Banda Nkwanta in the Savannah Region.

== See also ==
- Ghana Road Network
