= R40 road (Ghana) =

Regional road in Ghana

Regional Highway 40

Route information
- Maintained by Ghana Highways Authority

Major junctions
- South end: N4 at Adenta
- R13 at Dodowa
- North end: N2 at Kpong

Location
- Country: Ghana
- Major cities: Dodowa, Somanya

Highway system
- Ghana Road Network
← R38	→ R42

The R40 Regional Highway is a highway that begins at Adenta in the Greater Accra Region and runs through Dodowa and Somanya to Kpong in the Eastern Region. It is also known as the Accra - Dodowa Road.

== Route ==
The highway spans two regions: Greater Accra and the Eastern Region. It is also known as the Adenta Trom Road.

=== Greater Accra Region ===
The R40 begins in Adenta, branching off the N4 as the Accra-Dodowa Road. This section is known as the Adenta-Trom section. It heads through Frafraha and Ashieke to Amrahia, where a toll booth is located. It then continues through Oyibi and Bawaleshi to Dodowa, where the R13 (Afienya-Dodowa Road section) branches off from the R40 to the east.

=== Both regions ===
After Dodowa, it courses through the Eastern Region to Ayikuma, just over the border, then back into Greater Accra. It then goes to Amanfro before leaving the region once more.

=== Eastern Region ===
The road continues through Agomeda, Ogome, Somanya and Odumase Krobo to Kpong where it ends by meeting the N2.

== See also ==
- Ghana Road Network
