= R158 road (Ghana) =

Minor regional road in Upper East Region, Ghana

Regional Highway 158

Route information
- Maintained by Ghana Highways Authority

Major junctions
- West end: N10 at Winkogo
- North end: N11 at Nangodi

Location
- Country: Ghana

Highway system
- Ghana Road Network

The R158 or Regional Highway 158 is a minor regional highway in the Upper East Region of Ghana that begins at Winkogo and ends at Nangodi, by-passing Bolgatanga.

== See also ==
- Ghana Road Network
