= R10 road (Ghana) =

Highway in Ghana

Regional Highway 10

Route information
- Maintained by Ghana Highways Authority
- Length: 99 km (62 mi)

Major junctions
- South end: N1 at Denu (Tokor)
- R12 at Dzodze; R14 at Ziope
- North end: R28 at Ho

Location
- Country: Ghana
- Towns: Ave-Dakpa, Kpetoe

Highway system
- Ghana Road Network
← IR11	→ R11

The R10 Regional Highway is a highway in the Volta Region of Ghana. It begins at Tokor, on the northern edge of Denu and runs north through Dzodze, Ave Xevi, Ave Dakpa Agotime-Ziope and Agortime-Kpetoe ending at the regional capital of Ho. It is also known as the Ho - Denu road. It is an important link from Ho, the capital of the Volta Region which borders Togo and Denu near Aflao which is the main border crossing in the south between Ghana and Togo. The total length is about ninety-nine (99) kilometres.

== Route ==
=== Ketu South Municipal District ===
From the southern end, the road begins at a junction on the N1 at Tokor in the Ketu South Municipal District of the Volta Region. It continues via Kpoglu close to the international border with Togo, leaving the district.

=== Ketu North District ===
The R10 then heads northwest through Penyi in the Ketu North Municipal District to Dzodze its capital before leaving the district. The R12 from Akatsi to Akanu intersects the R10 at Dzodze.

=== Akatsi North District ===
The R10 then traverses the Akatsi North District, passing through Ave-Xevi, Ave-Afiadenyingba and Ave-Dakpa, the capital. It then follows the Ghana-Togo border in a north-westerly direction out of the district.

=== Agotime Ziope District ===
The R10 on entering the Agotime Ziope District goes through Ziope before turning northwards, hugging the Ghana-Togo border until Kpetoe which is the district capital. The R14 Akatsi-Ziope Road intersects the R10 at Ziope.

=== Ho Municipal District ===
The R10 then heads west, away from the border ending at Ho where it meets the Ho-Adidome Road, which is a section of the R28 from Fume to Sogakope.

== Maintenance ==
The R10 Ho-Dzodze-Denu road was one of those earmarked for major works by the Ghana government in 2020. Local citizens had in the past expressed displeasure at the level of maintenance of the Ho-Denu road and other projects.

== See also ==
- Ghana Road Network

== External source ==
- Ghana Highways Authority - Volta Region Road Network
