= R16 road (Ghana) =

Highway in the Volta Region of Ghana

Regional Highway 16

Route information
- Maintained by Ghana Highways Authority
- Length: 36 km (22 mi)

Major junctions
- South end: R11 at Srogbe
- North end: N1 at Dabala junction

Location
- Country: Ghana
- Towns: Dabala

Highway system
- Ghana Road Network
← R15	→ R17

The R16 Regional Highway is a highway located in the Volta Region of Ghana. It runs in a northerly direction from Srogbe, in the Anloga District of the Volta Region ending at the Dabala junction on the National Highway 1 (N1). The N1 is part of the Trans-African Highway network (Route 7).

== Route ==
The highway runs from south to north, starting at Srogbe and passing through Lolito and Dabala before ending at the Dabala junction.

The highway begins at Srogbe where it meets the R11 Regional Highway which runs from the west through Atorkor and eastwards through Whuti and onwards through Anloga, the district capital. It proceeds in a north westerly direction through Alakple-Kome junction. It continues through a number of villages including Agortoe and Agbatsivi. It then continues into the South Tongu District.

The road continues through Nyinuto in the district and further north west through Kpodui and Lolito. After Lolito, it turns east into Dabala, known for its market. It then proceeds northwards to meet the N1 highway, meeting it at Dabala junction at the section between Sogakope in the west and Akatsi. The N1 continues east on through Denu and Aflao to the border with Togo.

=== Maintenance ===
The R16 from Dabala junction to Srogbe continuing with the R11 to Keta was resurfaced during the era of the Rawlings government.

== See also ==
- Ghana Road Network

== External source ==
- Ghana Highways Authority - Volta Region Road Network
- Dabala junction on Afrilocal.net
