= IR2 road (Ghana) =

Road in Ghana

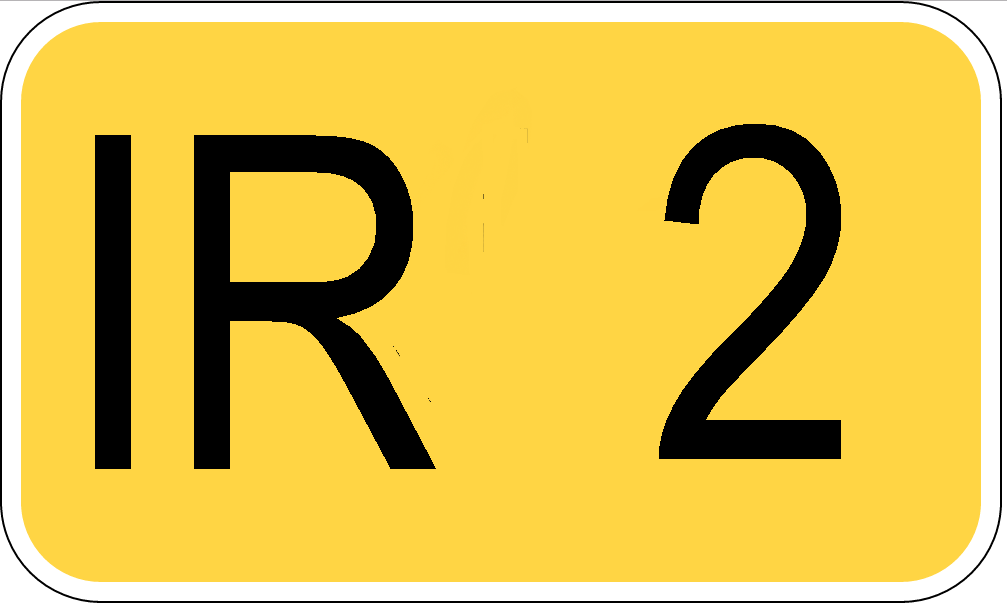
Inter-Regional Highway 2
- /0/queryThe property query is required; /0/idsThe property ids is required; /0Failed to match at least one schema; /0/titleThe property title is required; /0/serviceDoes not have a value in the enumeration ["page"]; /0Failed to match exactly one schema; /0/geometriesThe property geometries is required; /0/typeDoes not have a value in the enumeration ["GeometryCollection"]; /0/typeDoes not have a value in the enumeration ["MultiPolygon"]; /0/typeDoes not have a value in the enumeration ["Point"]; /0/typeDoes not have a value in the enumeration ["MultiPoint"]; /0/typeDoes not have a value in the enumeration ["LineString"]; /0/typeDoes not have a value in the enumeration ["MultiLineString"]; /0/typeDoes not have a value in the enumeration ["Polygon"]; /0/coordinatesThe property coordinates is required; /0/geometryThe property geometry is required; /0/typeDoes not have a value in the enumeration ["Feature"]; /0/featuresThe property features is required; /0/typeDoes not have a value in the enumeration ["FeatureCollection"]

Route information
- Maintained by Ghana Highways Authority

Major junctions
- South end: N1 at Winneba
- North end: N6 at Juaso

Location
- Country: Ghana

Highway system
- Ghana Road Network

The IR2 or Inter-Regional Highway 2 is a highway in Ghana that begins at Winneba and ends at Juaso.

== See also ==
- Ghana Road Network
