= R28 road (Ghana) =

Regional road in Ghana

Regional Highway 28

Route information
- Maintained by Ghana Highways Authority
- Length: 117 km (73 mi)

Major junctions
- South end: N1 at Sogakope; 5°59′56″N 0°35′42.5″E
- R24 at Adidome; R10 at Ho
- North end: N2 at Fume; 6°52′27.7″N 0°25′18.3″E

Location
- Country: Ghana

Highway system
- Ghana Road Network
← R27	→ R29

The R28 Regional Highway is a highway in the Volta Region of Ghana. It starts in the south from Sogakope through Ho the regional capital to Fume at its northern end. The total length is one hundred and seventeen (117) kilometres.

== Route ==
=== South Tongu District ===
The R28 Regional Highway starts in the South Tongu District as a junction off the N1 Highway which is part of the Trans–West African Coastal Highway through West Africa from Dakar in Senegal to Lagos in Nigeria. In Ghana, it runs from Elubo on the western border with the Côte d'Ivoire to Aflao on the eastern border with Togo. The R28 has three main sections. They are the Adidome-Sogakope Road, the Ho-Adidome road and the Fume-Ho road. After leaving the N1, it travels north through Dendo to Yorkutikpo where it turns westwards.

=== Central Tongu District ===
The R28 enters the Central Tongu District from the east and heads on to Mafi-Adidome, the district capital where it meets the Ho-Adidome road. Just off this junction is the junction of the R24 Regional Highway from Frankadua to Adidome with the Ho-Adidome road. The R28 then heads northwards on the Ho-Adidome road. It continues through Kpedzeglo and Mafi-Asiekpe.

=== Adaklu District ===
From Asiekpe, it continues north through Adaklu Ahunda Boso, Adaklu Ahunda Kpodzi and Adaklu Kpetsu. It then continues in a semi-circle round the western side ending at north of the Adaklu mountain at Tsrefe in an easterly direction. It then turns left at its junction with the Adaklu-Waya road and heads north towards Ho.

=== Ho Municipal District ===
Entering Ho, the regional capital from the south, the R28 courses right through it, exiting at its northwestern edge past Klefe and Ziavi, suburbs of Ho. It then continues through Taviefe to Matse. At Matse, it turns west before bending northwards.

=== Ho West District ===
The road continues north into the Ho West District where it passes through Dzolo Gbogame and then on to Dzolokpuita, the capital. It then continues through Vane and Biakpa. It runs past the western side of Amedzofe where it meets the N2 Highway at Fume.

== Maintenance ==
There have been concerns about the maintenance of this road. The road had been under contract for design and reconstruction by Messrs Frandesco West African Limited in 1996 under the Rawlings government. The works was stopped in 2001 and the contract terminated. The aggrieved company went to court. Richard Anane Adabor, Minister for Roads and Highways in the Kufuor government assured the Parliament of Ghana when questioned that work be restarted quickly.

== Fauna ==
Some birds found in the region covered by the R28 include the Common hooded vulture (Necrosyrtes monachus), the Harrier Hawk (Polyboroides radiatus), the Finch (Serinus mozambicus) and the Woodland kingfisher (Halcyon senegalensis). Some reptiles found here include the Nile monitor (Varanus niloticus) and the Agama lizard (Agama agama).

== See also ==
- Ghana Road Network

== External source ==
- Ghana Highways Authority - Volta Region Road Network
