= R12 road (Ghana) =

Regional road in Ghana

Regional Highway 12

Route information
- Maintained by Ghana Highways Authority
- Length: 30 km (19 mi)

Major junctions
- West end: N1 at Akatsi
- R14 at Akatsi; R10 at Dzodze
- East end: Akanu

Location
- Country: Ghana

Highway system
- Ghana Road Network
| ← R11 | → R13 |

The R12 Regional Highway is a highway in the Volta Region of Ghana. It starts from Akatsi in the west to Akanu on the border with Togo. It is 30 kilometres in length.

== Akatsi South District ==
The R12 starts at a junction complex with the N1 national highway at Akatsi, the capital of the Akatsi South District. It also intersects the R14 regional highway within Akatsi as it heads east. It runs past Lagbo and continues into the Ketu North Municipal District.

== Ketu North Municipal District ==
The R12 continues into the Ketu North Municipal District where it passes through Tadzewu before reaching the district capital, Dzodze. AT Dzodze, the R10 regional highway from Denu to Ho intersects it from south to north. The R12 runs for a short distance southwards along the R10 before continuing east to Akanu on the border with Togo. It continues across the border into Togo and carries on from Noepe to Agouenyive.

== See also ==
- Ghana Road Network

== External references ==
- R12 on OpenStreetMap
