= IR3 road (Ghana) =

Road in Ghana

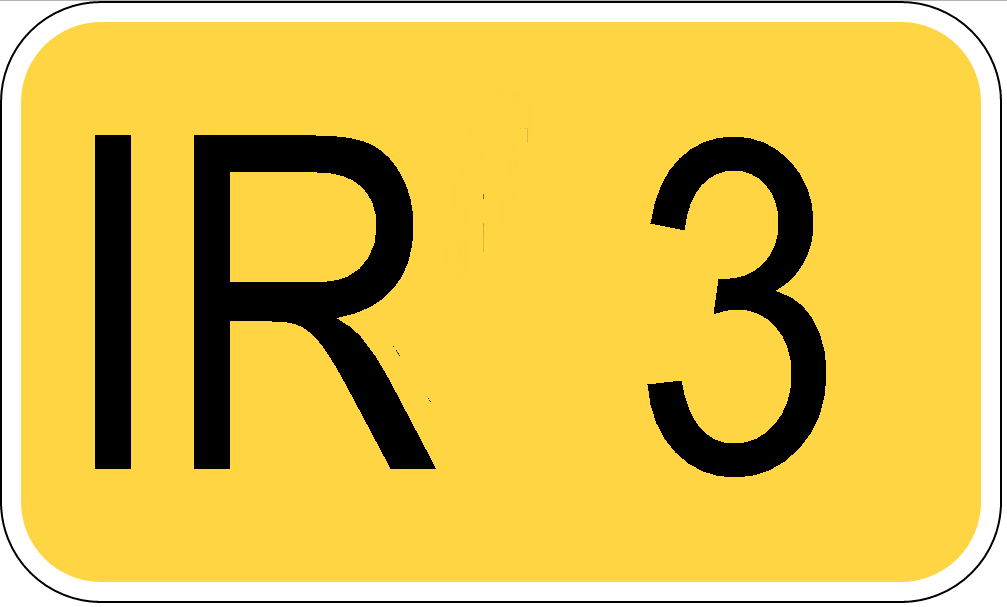
Inter-Regional Highway 3

Route information
- Maintained by Ghana Highways Authority

Major junctions
- West end: N10 at Obuasi
- East end: N3 at Oterkpalu

Location
- Country: Ghana

Highway system
- Ghana Road Network

The IR3 or Inter-Regional Highway 3 is a highway in Ghana that begins at Obuasi and ends at Oterkpalu in the Eastern Region.

== See also ==
- Ghana Road Network
