= N5 road (Ghana) =

National Highway 5

Route information
- Maintained by Ghana Highways Authority
- Length: 24.85 mi (39.99 km)

Major junctions
- West end: N2 at Adomi
- East end: R10 R26 R55 at Ho

Location
- Country: Ghana

Highway system
- Ghana Road Network
← N4	→ N6

The N5 or National Highway 5 is a national highway in Ghana that begins at Adomi in the Eastern region and runs east to Ho, where it intersects with the R26, which travels north to reconnect with the N2. At Ho, the N5 also intersects with the R10 and R55. The N5 spans a distance of 40 kilometers (25 miles).

== Route ==
Major towns and cities along the route of the N5 include Juapong, Sokode-Etoe, and Ho.

== See also ==
- Ghana Road Network
