= IR6 road (Ghana) =

Road in Ghana

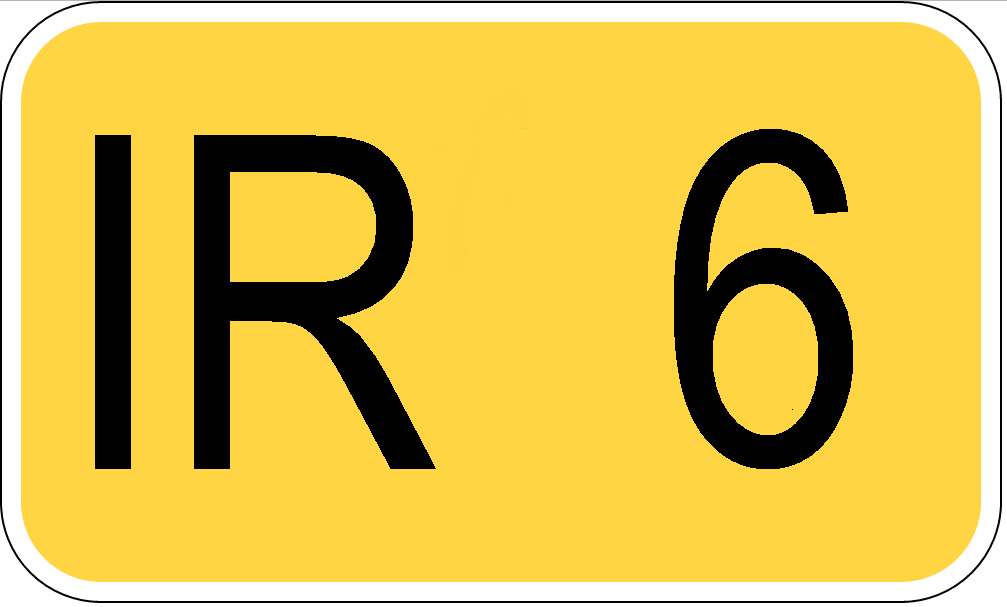
Inter-Regional Highway 6

Route information
- Maintained by Ghana Highways Authority

Major junctions
- West end: Agona
- East end: Ayanfuri

Location
- Country: Ghana

Highway system
- Ghana Road Network

The IR6 or Inter-Regional Highway 6 is a highway in Ghana that begins at Agona Junction in the Western Region and ends in Ayanfuri.

== See also ==
- Ghana Road Network
