= N18 road (Ghana) =

Road in Ghana

National Highway 18

Route information
- Maintained by Ghana Highways Authority

Major junctions
- South end: N12 at Wa
- North end: N13 at Han

Location
- Country: Ghana

Highway system
- Ghana Road Network

The N18 or National Highway 18 is a national highway in Ghana that begins at Wa and ends at Han both in Upper West Region.

== See also ==
- Ghana Road Network
