= IR1 road (Ghana) =

Road in Ghana

Inter-Regional Highway 1

Route information
- Maintained by Ghana Highways Authority
- Length: 88.23 mi (141.99 km)

Major junctions
- West end: N1 at Mankessim
- R62 at Ajumako; IR2 at Agona Swedru; R15 near Bawjiase; R64 at Adaiso; N6 at Nsawam
- East end: N4 at Aburi

Location
- Country: Ghana
- Major cities: Esiam

Highway system
- Ghana Road Network
← N15	→ IR2

The IR1 or Inter-Regional Highway 1 is a highway in Ghana that begins at Mankessim in the Central Region and runs through Agona Swedru and Nsawam to Aburi. It runs parallel to the N1 between the Central and Eastern regions, and has a total distance of 142 kilometers (88.23 miles). The route runs through the Central, Greater Accra and Eastern regions of Ghana.

The IR1 links the N1 in the Central region to the N6 in Eastern region.

== Route ==
Major towns and cities along the route of the IR1 include Mankessim, Agona Swedru, Nsawam, and Aburi.

=== Central Region ===
The IR1 begins as the Mankessim-Ajumako road in Mankessim, where it connects with the N1. It heads northwards from the N1. Shortly after it leaves the N1, it intersects the R80. It continues through Esiam to Ajumako. It then continues northeast to Bobikuma. The highway then proceeds eastwards to Agona Swedru where it has an intersection with the R62 which is in a north-south direction. It then turns northeast heading through Kwanyako and Bawjiasi before leaving the Central Region after Nsuobri.

=== Greater Accra Region ===
The IR1 has a short route through the Greater Accra Region. It enters from Nsuobri, heading northwards through Danso before leaving the region.

=== Eastern Region ===
From Danso in the Greater Accra Region, the IR1 continues northeast into the Eastern Region to Adeiso. It turns east through Nsawam where it intersects the N6 and then goes on to Aburi where it meets the N4 near the Aburi Botanical Gardens.

== See also ==
- Ghana Road Network
