= Madina-Adenta footbridges =

Bridges in Ghana

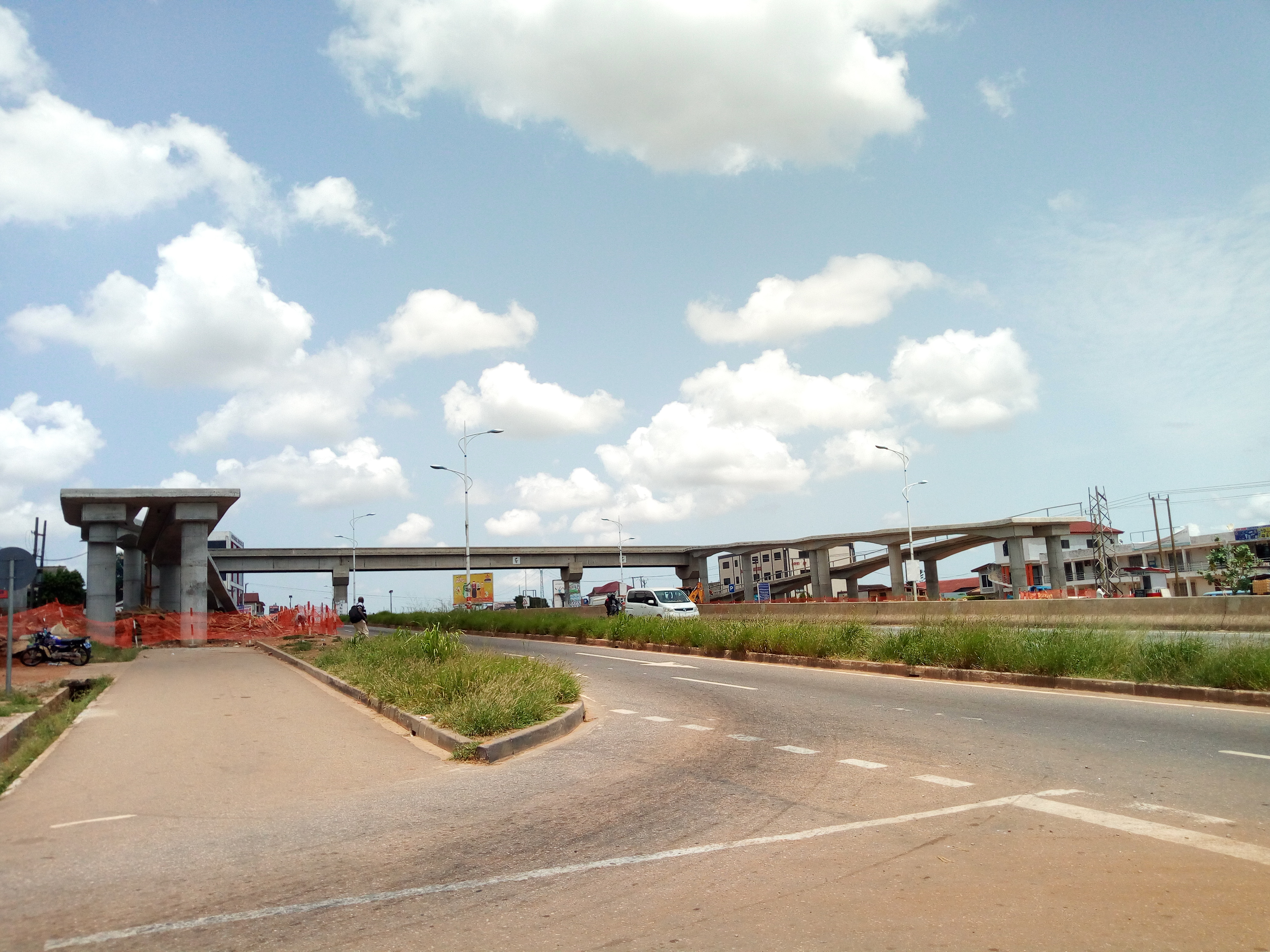
Access to footbridge at Firestone under construction

The Madina-Adenta footbridges are pedestrian bridges located along the N4 highway between Madina and Adenta in the Greater Accra region of Ghana.

== Deaths, accidents and demonstrations on the N4 highway ==
In 2018, there were a number of public demonstrations by local residents due to the high number of accidents and deaths of pedestrians around Adenta. The immediate trigger for the demonstrations was the death of a female student of the West African Senior High School (WASHS) (formerly West African Secondary School) who was killed in front of the school after being hit by a taxi cab. It was reported by the police that there had been about 24 people had been killed and another 164 injured due to the lack of access to footbridges across the motorway. Residents contest this figure and alleged that the real figure over the preceding 12 months was 195 people killed. This had led to school children and others having to negotiate the six lanes highway where cars were often driven over the speed limit. In response to the demonstrations, the Ministry of Roads and Highways responded that work on the six footbridges which had been left uncompleted for years will begin within a week. The Ministry of Interior had also requested the Ghana Police Service that it deploys members of its Motor Traffic Unit to help improve road safety. The head of the West Africa Senior High School located close to the N4 highway at Adenta disclosed that in 2018 alone, six students of the school had been hit by vehicles on the road. President Nana Akufo-Addo blamed the lack of footbridges for pedestrians to cross the highway on decades of neglect, lack of continuity when there is change of government in Ghana, a culture of improper maintenance and high rate of irresponsibility among Ghanaians.

== Footbridges ==
A total of six footbridges had been designed for the highway when it was constructed. They had however been abandoned since the completion of the roads. Heading from south to north, these are located at the Atomic Junction, Madina Zongo Junction, Redco Flats, the Ritz Junction, Seventh Day Adventist (SDA) junction and at the West African Senior High School. The first to be completed was the one at the SDA junction. Following the completion of the footbridges, there have been complaints about how long it takes to cross the roads and also their length. This has led to increased incidence of jaywalkers. The police have made arrests in the interest of road safety. The authorities conceded by announcing that although the design was to promote accessibility for all, they will introduce staircases at some of the footbridges.

== See also ==
- N4 road (Ghana)
