= IR5 road (Ghana) =

Road in Ghana

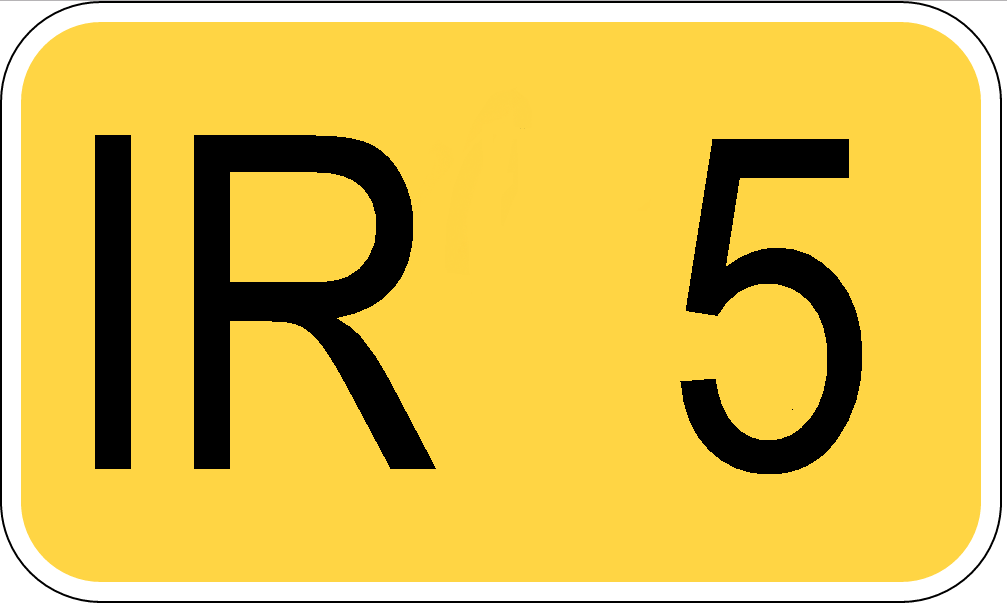
Inter-Regional Highway 5
- /0/queryThe property query is required; /0/idsThe property ids is required; /0Failed to match at least one schema; /0/titleThe property title is required; /0/serviceDoes not have a value in the enumeration ["page"]; /0Failed to match exactly one schema; /0/geometriesThe property geometries is required; /0/typeDoes not have a value in the enumeration ["GeometryCollection"]; /0/typeDoes not have a value in the enumeration ["MultiPolygon"]; /0/typeDoes not have a value in the enumeration ["Point"]; /0/typeDoes not have a value in the enumeration ["MultiPoint"]; /0/typeDoes not have a value in the enumeration ["LineString"]; /0/typeDoes not have a value in the enumeration ["MultiLineString"]; /0/typeDoes not have a value in the enumeration ["Polygon"]; /0/coordinatesThe property coordinates is required; /0/geometryThe property geometry is required; /0/typeDoes not have a value in the enumeration ["Feature"]; /0/featuresThe property features is required; /0/typeDoes not have a value in the enumeration ["FeatureCollection"]

Route information
- Maintained by Ghana Highways Authority

Major junctions
- West end: Osei Kojokrom
- East end: N10 at Abuakwa

Location
- Country: Ghana

Highway system
- Ghana Road Network

The IR5 or Inter-Regional Highway 5 is a highway in Ghana that begins at Osei Kojokrom in the Western Region and ends in Abuakwa.

== See also ==
- Ghana Road Network
