= N11 road (Ghana) =

Road in Ghana

National Highway 11

Route information
- Maintained by Ghana Highways Authority
- Length: 110.8 km (68.8 mi)

Major junctions
- West end: N10 at Bolgatanga
- East end: N2 at Bawku

Location
- Country: Ghana

Highway system
- Ghana Road Network
← N10	→ N12

The N11 or National Highway 11 is a national highway in Ghana that begins at Bolgatanga in the Upper East Region (N10) and runs east to Bawku, where it intersects with the N2. The N11 is 110.8 km long.

== Route ==
Major towns and cities along the route of the N11 include Bolgatanga, Zuarungu, Zebilla and Bawku.

== See also ==
- Ghana Road Network
