= R28 =

R28 may refer to:

== Roads ==
- R28 road (Ghana)
- R-28 regional road (Montenegro)
- R28 (South Africa)

== Other uses ==
- R28 (New York City Subway car)
- HMS Verulam (R28), a destroyer of the Royal Navy
- R28: Very toxic if swallowed, a risk phrase
- Renault R28, a Formula One racing car
