= IR4 road (Ghana) =

Road in Ghana

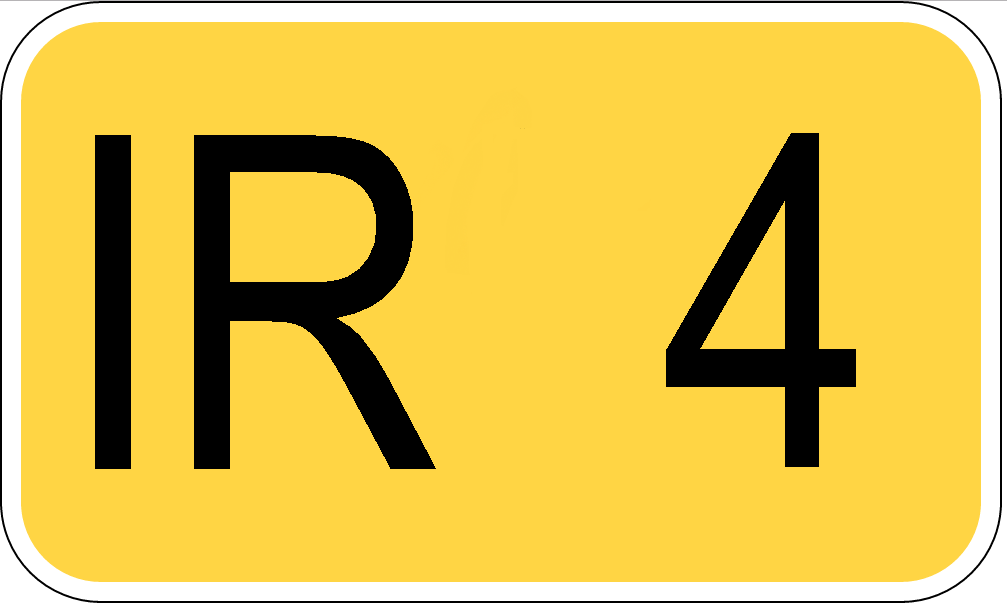
Inter-Regional Highway 4

Route information
- Maintained by Ghana Highways Authority

Major junctions
- South end: N10 at Kumasi
- North end: N9 at Chambuligu

Location
- Country: Ghana

Highway system
- Ghana Road Network

The IR4 or Inter-Regional Highway 4 is a highway in Ghana that begins at Kumasi and ends in Chambuligu in the Northern Region.

== See also ==
- Ghana Road Network
