= R40 =

R40, R-40, or similar, may refer to:

== Roads ==
- R40 road (Belgium)
- R40 road (Ghana)
- R40 (South Africa)

== Other uses ==
- R-40 (missile), a Soviet air-to-air missile
- R40 (New York City Subway car)
- Chloromethane, a refrigerant
- R40: Limited evidence of a carcinogenic effect, a risk phrase
- R40 Live Tour, a 2015 tour by Canadian rock band Rush
- R40 series of preferred numbers
- Renault R40, a French tank
- Rover 75, an executive car
- Samsung Sens R40, a laptop
- Toyota TownAce (R40), a Japanese van
- R40, a Ferris wheel designed by Ronald Bussink
