= N3 road (Ghana) =

Road in Ghana

National Highway 3

Route information
- Maintained by Ghana Highways Authority
- Length: 25 mi (40 km)

Major junctions
- East end: N2 at Kpong
- R30 near Somanya; IR3 at Oterkpalu
- West end: R42 at Koforidua

Location
- Country: Ghana
- Major cities: Kpong, Oterkpalu, Koforidua

Highway system
- Ghana Road Network
← N2	→ N4

The N3 or National Highway 3 is a national highway in Ghana that begins at Kpong and runs west through Oterkpalu to Koforidua. It is a link between the N2 and N4 in the Eastern region of the country, with a total distance of 40 kilometers (25 miles).

== Route ==
Major towns and cities along the route of the N3 include Kpong, Suhum, Oterkpalu, and Koforidua. The N3 runs parallel to the Lolo River.

The N3 runs southwest from Kpong, intersecting with the R30 near Somanya before veering north to Oterkpalu, where it intersects with the IR3. From Oterkpalu, the route turns south toward Koforidua, where it intersects with the R42.

== See also ==
- Ghana Road Network
