= N12 road (Ghana) =

Highway in Ghana

National Highway 12

Route information
- Maintained by Ghana Highways Authority
- Length: 670 km (420 mi)

Major junctions
- South end: B102 in Côte d'Ivoire
- N1 at Elubo; R123 at Enchi; R63 at Goaso; R93 at Wenchi; N7 at Sawla; N18 at Wa; R132 at Nadowli; N13 at Lawra; R132 at Nandom; R131 at Hamile
- North end: N20 in Burkina Faso

Location
- Country: Ghana

Highway system
- Ghana Road Network
← N11	→ N13

The N12 or National Highway 12 is a national highway in Ghana that begins at the Ghana - Côte d'Ivoire border in the Western Region of Ghana and travels generally north to Hamile on the Ghana - Burkina Faso border. Its total length is 670 kilometres.

== Route ==
Major towns and cities along the route of the N12 include Enchi, Goaso, Mim, Sunyani, Wenchi, Bamboi, Sawla, Wa and Lawra.

=== Western Region ===
The N12 starts at Elubo, Jomoro District, where it forms a junction with N1 highway which forms part of the West African Highway. It heads northwards passing to the west of the Nini Suhien National Park and Ankasa Conservation Area before heading past the east side of the Jema Asemkrom Forest Reserve. It continues northwards out of the region.

=== Western North Region ===
The N12 forms a junction with the R123 road just before it arrives at Enchi in the Aowin District of the Western North Region. It continues in a north westerly direction passing through Dadieso. After Putsi, it travels eastward, passing through Helehele, Nkwanta to Buaku. It then turns northwards and heads out of the region.

=== Ahafo Region ===
After entering the Ahafo Region, the N12 passes through Sankore and meets the Goaso-Bibiani road. At this junction, it turns northwards, going through Nobekaw and then through Kukuom, the capital of the Asunafo South District. It enters the Asunafo North Municipal District, passing through Goaso the capital of Ahafo Region until Mim, where it has a junction with the Goaso Amasu road. It then heads in a north-easterly direction as the Sunyani-Mim road.

=== Bono Region ===
The Sunyani-Mim road continues until Sunyani in the Sunyani Municipal District, which is also the capital of the Bono Region. The N12 leaves the eastern side of Sunyani as the Sunyan-Wenchi road, goes through Yawhima and then bends northwards to arrive at Wenchi in the Wenchi Municipal District. It then continues northwards as the Wa-Bole road. It continues until Langoro where it crosses the Black Volta river into the Savannah Region.

=== Savannah Region ===
In the Savannah Region, it starts off by passing through Bamboi in the Bole District, heading north west to Bole before turning north to Sawla, capital of the Sawla-Tuna-Kalba district. At Sawla, it has a junction with the N7 highway which travels through Larabanga and Damongo to Fulfoso as well as the Sawla-Kalba road. It then continues through Tuna and finally Ga before leaving the region.

=== Upper West Region ===
The N12 enters Tanina in the Upper West Region before heading northwards to Wa, the capital of both the Wa Municipal District and the Upper West Region. The N18 highway from Wa to Heng branches off at Wa heading north. The N12 continues north west to Nadowli, capital of the Nadowli Kaleo district. It maintains the northwesterly course to Lawra, capital of the Lawra Municipal district. The R132 branches north from Nadowli to Nandom, capital of the Nandom Municipal District. The N13 highway heads east from Lawra through Tumu to Navrongo. It then heads in a north easterly direction to Nandom. The N12 itself then turns north to Hamile in the Jirapa/Lambussie District where the R131 heads east to Tumu. The N12 continues to the border with Burkina Faso.

== Maintenance ==
The Black Volta bridge was closed in September 2018 for repairs as some defects were noticed at the time. In September 2020, work started on the section between Elubo and Enchi, a total of 71.25 kilometres which is expected to be completed after 42 months in 2024.

== See also ==
- Ghana Road Network
