= R106 road (Ghana) =

Regional road in Ashanti Region, Ghana

Regional Highway 106

Route information
- Maintained by Ghana Highways Authority

Major junctions
- South end: Abono
- North end: Kumasi

Location
- Country: Ghana

Highway system
- Ghana Road Network

The R106 or Regional Highway 106 is a regional highway in the Ashanti Region of Ghana that begins at Abono around the Lake Bosomtwe and terminates in Kumasi

== See also ==
- Ghana Road Network
