= Tokor =

- Village
- Location in Ghana
- Coordinates: 6°6′46″N 1°7′58″E
- Country: Ghana
- Region: Volta Region
- District: Ketu South Municipal
- Elevation: 64 m (210 ft)
- Time zone: GMT
  - Summer (DST): GMT

Tokor is a village located on the south-eastern corner of the Volta Region of Ghana, near the Ghana-Togo border. It lies at the intersection of the N1 and R10 roads. The administrative office of Ketu South Municipal district is situated at Tokor.
