= Constance Edjeani-Afenu =

Ghanaian brigadier general (1959/1960 – 2022)

Constance Ama Emefa Edjeani-Afenu
- Born: March 5, 1960; Vane Avatime, Volta Region, Ghana
- Died: January 24, 2022 (aged 61); 37 Military Hospital, Accra, Ghana
- Education: Ghana Institute of Management and Public Administration (BSc); Ghana Institute of Journalism (Dip)
- Occupation: Military officer
- Known for: First female Major General of the Ghana Armed Forces (posthumous); UNMIL (Liberia); MINURSO (Western Sahara)
- Spouse: Fred Afenu
- Children: 3
- Awards: African Union Gender Champion (2017)

Constance Ama Emefa Edjeani-Afenu (5 March 1960 ― 24 January 2022; née Edjeani) was the first female brigadier general of the Ghana Armed Forces and, posthumously, the first female major general.

She was deployed to several United Nations peacekeeping missions, including missions in Lebanon, Liberia and the Democratic Republic of the Congo. She also served as the Deputy Military Adviser to Ghana's permanent Mission in New York City.

== Early life ==
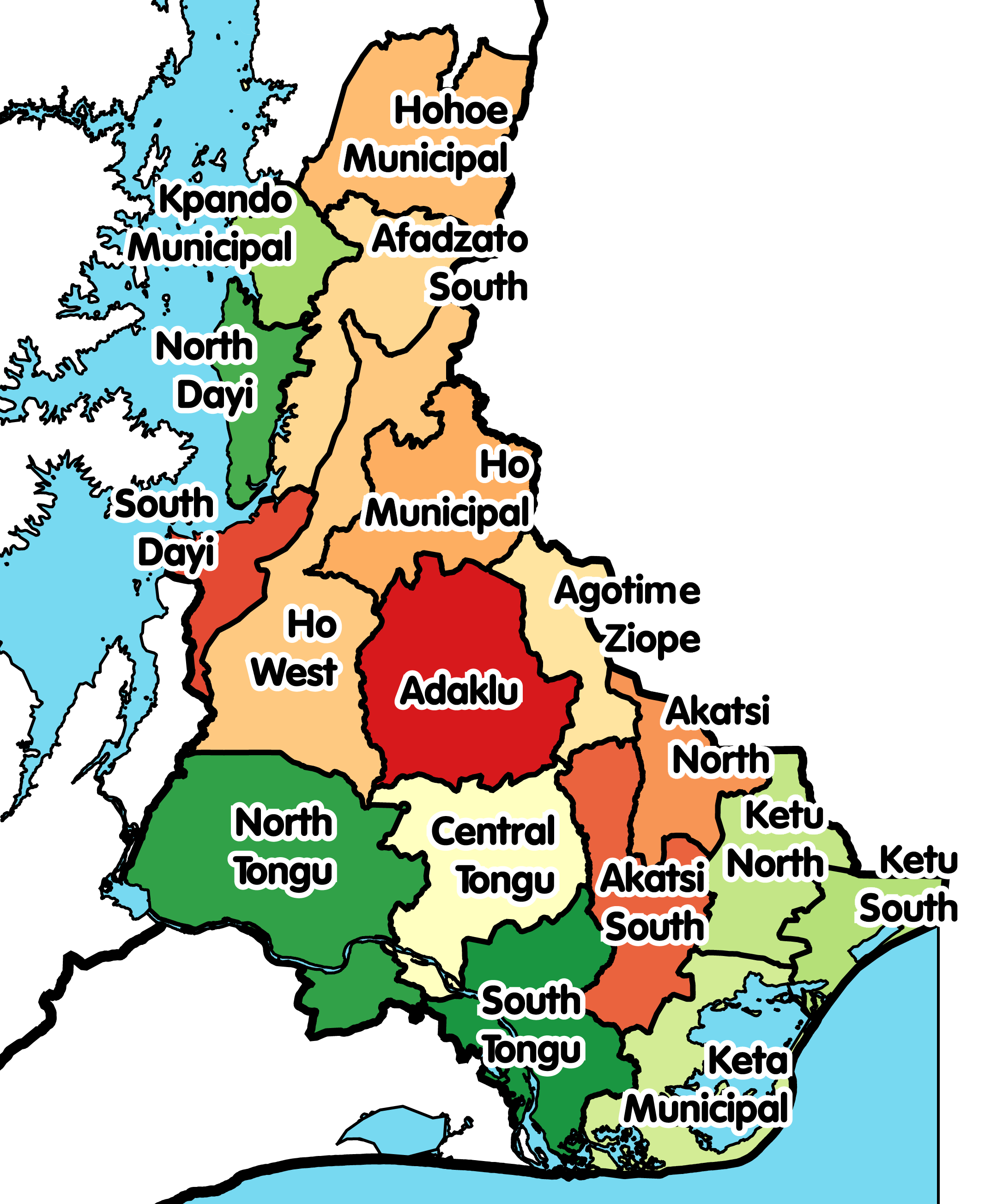
Volta Region of Ghana

Constance Ama Emefa Edjeani-Afenu was born on 5 March 1960 at Vane Avatime, Volta Region, and raised in Ho, the capital of the Volta Region of Ghana. She was the sixth-born of ten siblings, and her younger sister is Ghanaian actress, Akofa Edjeani. Her father served in the military, and two of her siblings also pursued military careers, though they predeceased her. Her mother was Mrs. Alice Grette Kwawu-Edzeani.

Edjeani-Afenu attended Kamina Barracks Primary School and Armed Forces Experimental School in Kumasi before completing her O- and A-levels at Wesley Girl's Senior High School in Cape Coast.

== Education ==
Edjeani-Afenu holds a Bachelor of Science in accounting from the Ghana Institute of Management and Public Administration (GIMPA). She obtained a Post Graduate Diploma in Management Practice from the Paris Graduate School of Management, and completed a Diploma in Public Relations and Advertising at the Ghana Institute of Journalism (GIJ).

She has earned several professional certifications, including a Certificate in Public Administration, a Certificate in Budgeting and Financial Management, and a Certificate in Wealth Creation from the Swiss eLearning Institute.

== Career ==
Edjeani-Afenu entered the Ghanaian Armed Forces in 1978, at age 18 and dedicated 41 years of her life to military service. She was one of only two female students in her intake, and the other woman left the course after a few weeks. Edjeani-Afenu was commissioned on 25 April 1980 as a Second Lieutenant after 18 months of training at Ghana Military Academy. In the early 1990s, she was at the Junior Division of the Armed Forces Command and Staff College, She later joined the Forces Pay Regiment as a commanding officer in 1999.

In February 1999, the then Major Edjeani-Afenu was appointed the Commanding Officer of the Forces Pay Office, making her the first female Commanding Officer of a Unit in the Ghana Armed Forces.

She was appointed to serve as the Deputy Military Adviser of the Permanent Mission in the New York from 2013 to 2016. It was also the first time a woman had occupied that position.

As part of Ghana Battalion, she was deployed to UNIFIL in 1994 and 1998, MONUSCO in 2007, and UNMIL in 2009.

On 7 March 2016, Edjeani-Afenu was promoted to the rank of Brigadier General, the highest position ever occupied by a female in the Armed Forces.

The UN appointed her as the Deputy Force Commander in MINURSO in September 2019, where she was stationed in Western Sahara.

Edjeani's career is of particular significance to the Ghanaian people and the African community because her achievements represent the efforts of African countries to be more inclusive and representative with their military staffing. In 2018, the Department for Peacekeeping Operations (DPKO) and Department for Field Support (DFS) published its first 'Policy on Gender Responsive United Nations Peacekeeping Operations', outlining a mandatory requirement for all uniformed and civilian personnel to ensure UN and African Union peacekeeping operations consider women and men's concerns and experiences equally throughout all levels of service. Edjeani's service was an example of the fruit of these combined efforts. Because of these initiatives, she became a part of the 17 percent of women serving in the Ghana Armed Forces across all ranks and services (up from 10 percent in 2006) and the 12.5 percent of the GAF's deployed women peacekeepers.

== Achievements ==
During Edjeani-Afenu's training, she was appointed Cadet Sergeant, a position previously only held by male recruits. She earned the Determination and Perseverance Trophy in her graduating class, Ghana Armed Forces.

In February 1999, Major-General Edjeani-Afenu was appointed the Commanding Officer of the Forces Pay Office, making her the first female Commanding Officer of a Unit in the Ghana Armed Forces.

In March 2017, she was promoted to Brigadier-General in the Armed Forces. This made her the first female to get this rank in GAF.

She was named the African Union (A.U.) Gender champion for 2017 by the president of Ghana, Nana Akufo-Addo. She received the "First Lady's Award" on International Women's Day in 2019 from Rebecca Akufo-Addo.

She was posthumously promoted to the rank of major general, with the approval of the president of Ghana, becoming the first Ghanaian female to attain this position.

== The memoir: The Lady in Boots ==
On 6 September 2023, Edjeani-Afenu's memoir titled Lady in Boots was published (ISBN 9789988361426). It was specifically launched during an event at Burma Hall in Burma Camp, Accra. This memoir contains a detailed recitation of her life, family, time in the military, and serving God. Throughout the 326 pages, she recounts the expectation of females in the Ghana Armed Forces (GAF) and the consideration of gender mainstreaming.

During the book launch event, the current Ghana Ambassador to Egypt, Lieutenant General Obed Boamah Akwa, acknowledged the uniqueness of the launch was due to the personality of Edjeani-Afenu. He continued to state that Edjeani-Afenu's ability to achieve so much in her lifetime indicated her dedication and purpose. Brigadier General Anita Asmah pointed to her military insight and contributions made to gender mainstreaming in the GAF. She described how a chapter of the book is dedicated to "gender contemporary issues" and the practices that could be used to combat it, such as holding a lecture on gender equality and mainstreaming within the United Nation (UN) and the GAF.

== Personal life and death ==
Edjeani married Fred Afenu, an army officer; they had three children.

She died in 37 Military Hospital on 24 January 2022, after a brief illness.
