= Telephone numbers in Ghana =

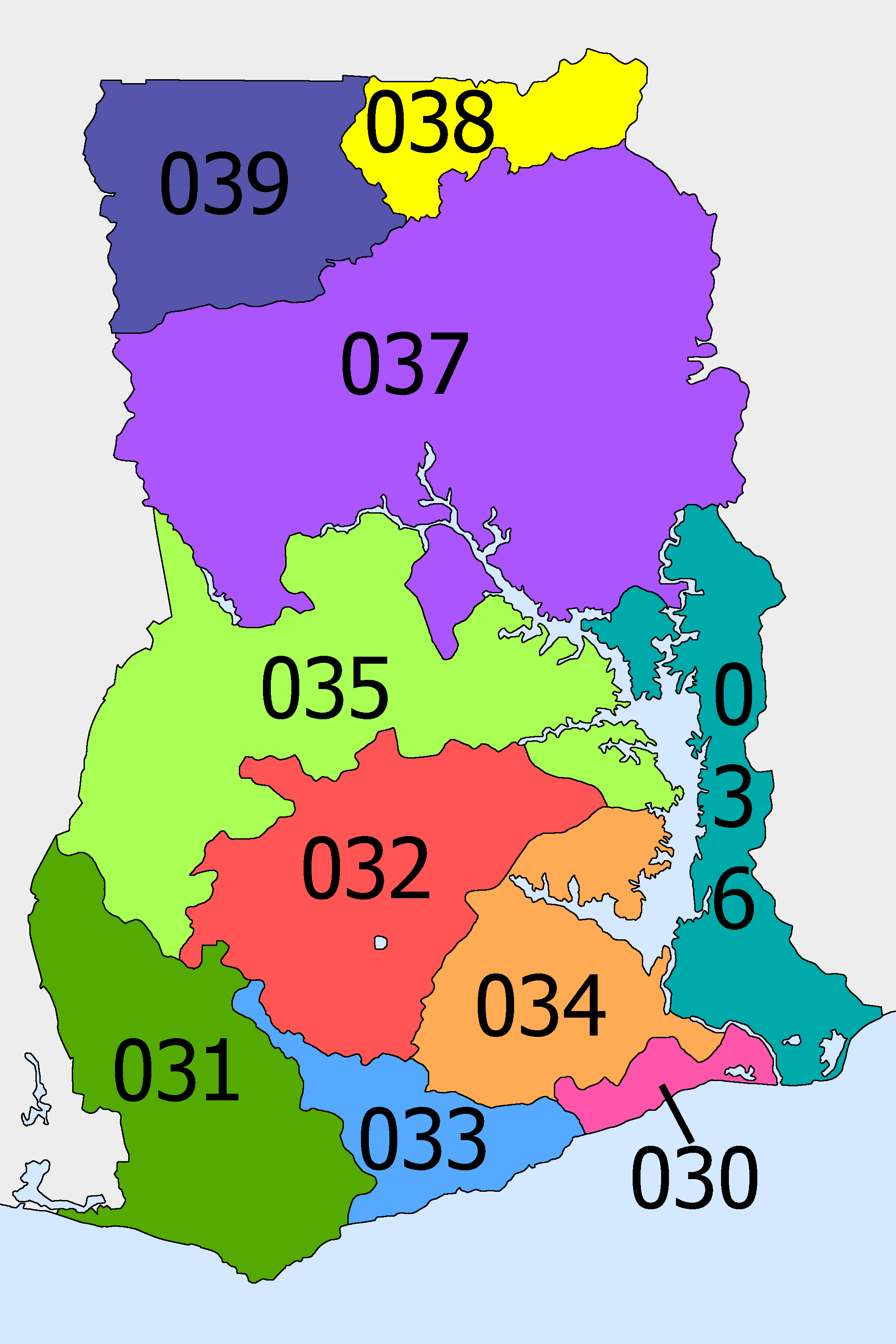
- Regional codes
- Country: Ghana
- Continent: Africa
- Regulator: National Communications Authority
- Numbering plan type: Closed
- NSN length: 9
- Format: 3X XXX XXXX
- Country code: 233
- International access: 00
- Long-distance: 0

The telephone numbering plan of Ghana is administered by the National Communications Authority, which holds responsibility for telecommunications.

Since 1 May 2010, all fixed-line numbers and mobile telephone numbers have nine digits, comprising one digit for the area code and eight digits for the local directory number. It is customary to also include the trunk prefix 0 before the national telephone number in listings.

== Fixed-line numbering plan ==
Region	Old numbering plan	Current numbering plan
Ashanti
Kumasi	051 XXXXX	032 20XXXXX
Konongo	0531 XXXXX	032 21XXXXX
Ashanti Mampong	0561 XXXXX	032 22XXXXX
Ejura	0565 XXXXX	032 23XXXXX
Bekwai	0572 XXXXX	032 24XXXXX
Obuasi	0582 XXXXX	032 25XXXXX
Brong Ahafo
Sunyani	061 XXXXX	035 20XXXXX
Bechem	0632 XXXXX	035 21XXXXX
Berekum	0642 XXXXX	035 22XXXXX
Dormaa Ahenkro	0648 XXXXX	035 23XXXXX
Wenchi	0652 XXXXX	035 24XXXXX
Techiman	0653 XXXXX	035 25XXXXX
Atebubu	0567 XXXXX	035 26XXXXX
Yeji	0568 XXXXX	035 27XXXXX
Central
Swedru	041 XXXXX	033 20XXXXX
Cape Coast	042 XXXXX	033 21XXXXX
Dunkwa	0372 XXXXX	033 22XXXXX
Winneba	0432 XXXXX	033 23XXXXX
Eastern
Koforidua	081 XXXXX	034 20XXXXX
Nsawam	0832 XXXXX	034 21XXXXX
Nkawkaw	0842 XXXXX	034 31XXXXX
Mpraeso	0846 XXXXX	034 23XXXXX
Donkorkrom	0848 XXXXX	034 24XXXXX
Suhum	0858 XXXXX	034 25XXXXX
Asamankese	0863 XXXXX	034 26XXXXX
Akuapim Mampong	0872 XXXXX	034 27XXXXX
Aburi	0876 XXXXX	034 28XXXXX
Akim Oda	0882 XXXXX	034 292XXXX
Akosombo	0251 XXXXX	034 30XXXXX
Greater Accra
Accra	021 XXXXXX	030 2XXXXXX
Tema	022 XXXXXX	030 3XXXXXX
Ada	0968 XXXXX	030 35XXXXX
Northern
Tamale	071 XXXXX	037 20XXXXX
Walewale	0715 XXXXX	037 21XXXXX
Buipe	0716 XXXXX	037 22XXXXX
Damongo	0717 XXXXX	037 23XXXXX
Yendi	0744 XXXXX	037 24XXXXX
Bole	0746 XXXXX	037 25XXXXX
Salaga	0752 XXXXX	037 26XXXXX
Upper East
Bolgatanga	072 XXXXX	038 20XXXXX
Navrongo	0742 XXXXX	038 21XXXXX
Bawku	0743 XXXXX	038 22XXXXX
Upper West
Wa	0756 XXXXX	039 20XXXXX
Volta
Ho	091 XXXXX	036 20XXXXX
Amedzofe	0931 XXXXX	036 21XXXXX
Hohoe	0935 XXXXX	036 27XXXXX
Kpandu	0936 XXXXX	036 23XXXXX
Kete-Krachi	0953 XXXXX	036 24XXXXX
Denu/Aflao	0962 XXXXX	036 25XXXXX
Keta/Akatsi	0966 XXXXX	036 26XXXXX
Western
Takoradi	031 xxxxx	031 20XXXXX
Axim	0342 XXXXX	031 21XXXXX
Elubo	0345 XXXXX	031 22XXXXX
Tarkwa	0362 XXXXX	031 23XXXXX
Asankragwa	0392 XXXXX	031 24XXXXX
Samreboi	0394 XXXXX	031 25XXXXX
Enchi	0395 XXXXX	031 26XXXXX

== Mobile numbering plan ==
Due to the unreliability of fixed-line infrastructure in Ghana, mobile phones are more widely used. Competition among the various mobile carriers has spurred growth with a subscriber penetration rate of 98% in 2010. The poor call quality of mobile phones, however, means that more people hold more than one mobile phone, usually with two or more different carriers.

The various mobile carriers in Ghana have each been assigned a network code.

Mobile carrier	Network code(s)
Globacom	023
MTN	024, 025, 053, 054, 055, 059
AirtelTigo	027, 057, 026, 056
Expresso	028
Vodafone	020, 050

== Emergency numbers ==
Institution	Emergency code
Emergency service	112
Police	112, 191, 18555
Fire service	112, 192
Ambulance	112, 193

== See also ==
- Telecommunications in Ghana
