= Banda Nkwanta =

Town in Savannah Region, Ghana

Coordinates: 8°21′03″N 2°08′11″W

Banda Nkwanta is a small town in the Savannah Region of Ghana, located at the intersection of the R94 road and the N12 highway. It is known for the Banda Nkwanta Mosque.
