= Sakpeigu =

Small community in Northern region, Ghana

Coordinates: 9°32′57″N 0°01′29″W

Sakpeigu is a small community along the N2 road in the Northern Region of Ghana. The southern terminus of the N14 road begins at Sakpeigu, where it intersects the N2 road.
