= Han, Ghana =

Town in Upper West Region, Ghana

Coordinates: 10°41′24″N 2°26′37″W

Han is a town located in the Upper West Region of Ghana. It lies at the intersection of the N18 and N13 highways. Han is directly connected to Wa via the N18 highway.
