= Sawla Senior High School =

Co-educational boarding school in Salwa, Ghana

Coordinates: 9.2584°N 2.3934°W

Sawla Senior High School is a co-educational second cycle boarding school located at Sawla, in the Sawla-Tuna-Kalba district of the Savannah Region of Ghana.

In 2019, a teacher at the school raped a student. In February 2020, his employment was terminated after he admitted to sexual misconduct with multiple female students. He was convicted and sentenced to 15 years in prison in 2022. In 2022, the school had the lowest performance across the Savannah Region in the West African Senior School Certificate Examinations. The same year, a fire burnt a hostel which accommodated students at the school, burning personal belongings. After a former headmistress requested aid online, the school received relief items and monetary donations from people in Germany.
