= Winkogo =

Town in Upper East Region, Ghana

Coordinates: 10°43′24″N 0°52′06″W

Winkogo is a town in the Upper East Region of Ghana. The Ghana Football Association Upper East Regional office and the Winkogo Technical Centre are located here. Winkogo is located along the N10 and R158 roads, where R158 begins and connects Winkogo to Nangodi.
