= Tarkwa–Bogoso–Ayamfuri Road =

Road in Ghana

The Tarkwa–Bogoso–Ayanfuri Road is a 94.4-kilometre (58.7 mi) road that is being constructed by the Government of Ghana to link the three mining towns of Tarkwa, Bogoso and Ayanfuri.
