= N14 road (Ghana) =

Road in Ghana

National Highway 14

Route information
- Maintained by Ghana Highways Authority

Major junctions
- South end: Sakpiegu
- North end: Yawgu

Location
- Country: Ghana

Highway system
- Ghana Road Network
| ← N13 |

The N14 or National Highway 14 is a national highway in Ghana that begins at Sakpeigu in the Northern Region, passes through Chereponi and terminates at Yawgu.

== See also ==
- Ghana Road Network
