= N13 road (Ghana) =

Road in Ghana

National Highway 13

Route information
- Maintained by Ghana Highways Authority

Major junctions
- West end: N12 at Lawra
- East end: N10 at Navrongo

Location
- Country: Ghana

Highway system
- Ghana Road Network
← N12	→ N14

The N13 or National Highway 13 is a national highway in Ghana that begins at Lawra in the Upper West Region, passes through Tumu and terminates at Navrongo in the Upper East Region.

== See also ==
- Ghana Road Network
