= Vane, Avatime =

Town in the Volta Region, Ghana

Coordinates: 6°49′N 0°25′E

Avatime Vane is the capital of the Avatime Traditional Area of Ghana. It is located on the Eastern section of the Akwapim-Togo mountain range. Vane is located on the main Ho-Fume road and is the first settlement located on highlands North East of Dzolokpuita (about 5 km South). The Paramount Chief of Avatime, known as the Osie, resides in Vane.

== Location ==
Vane Lies 1,049 ft ( 319meters) on the contour above sea level, located in the Eastern section of the Akwapim-Togo mountain range, an ancient volcanic mountain formation that rises from the lower Volta basin and runs in a North-Easterly direction into Togo. The town rests on several hills, all of which sit in a major valley shielded to the East by the Gayi Escarpment- an ancient granite rock formation with very steep slopes and heights reaching up to 1,200 ft above sea level.

== Climate ==
Like the other settlements which form the Avatime Traditional area (Amedzofe, Biakpa, Dzogbefeme, Gbadzeme, Fume, and Dzokpe), Vane enjoys a serene and invigorating microclimate. The weather is typical of the Avatime Traditional Area, with mild breezes and cloud covers interspersed with sunny skies. The rains normally start from the Eastern section of town (Nyanui) and are carried Westward by the winds. Avatime Vane's rainfall pattern largely falls within that of the forest belt of Ghana's. The rainy season starts in May/June and ends in Oct/November whilst the Dry Season begins in November and ends in April.

== Schools ==
The town has Primary, Junior, and Senior High Schools. The antecedents to the present day school system in Vane date back to the advent of the German Missionaries in the late 19th and early 20th Centuries who established Mission schools to prepare the people in line with the overall objectives of colonial education. Today, the school system in Avatime Vane consists of over 1,000 pupils from class 1 to SHS 3.

== History and culture ==
In the mid-1980s, the Rako Tree planting project was commenced giving rise to the planting of many tree seedlings. Today, Avatime can best be described as a "Garden Town" due to the green belt of trees which dot its natural topography.

The chiefs and people of Avatim together with their kinsmen from the Avatime Traditional Area celebrate the AMU or Rice Festival through the week leading to, and on the first weekend in the month of November every year. This festival is celebrated in lieu of the agricultural activities forming the major economic activity of the people and rice cultivated as a staple. Rice cultivated in Avatime Vane and its environs is genetically different from the most prevalent rice varieties cultivated in Ghana. It is the peculiarity of this rice to Avatime that, gave rise to the Amu (Rice) Festival.

Avatime Vane, being a town nestled between a series of mountainous peaks which culminated into the second highest peak in Ghana, is strategically positioned to be developed into a tourist hot bed. The development of a cable car network to link the various peaks will open up the magic of lush vegetative expanses never to be accessed from the ground to millions of tourists. This expanses are also interspersed with settlements and roads built along the contours of the mountain range forming a beauty of natural and human interdependence. A varied species of birds and butterflies not seen anywhere in the tropics can be viewed and photographed from the air.

== Hiking ==
Hiking is another tourist activity that is unique to Avatime Vane. Although the terrain will not allow for biking, the traditional hunting and farming trails lead to magnificent caves and rock formation sites, creeks and waterfalls. This trails enables all to study the vegetative strata from the ground although in most instances, you can only see up to the canopy formed by the first layer of trees although the forests are three layered. Bird watching is also possible from the ground although better from the air.
