= Akplabanya =

Community in Greater Accra Region

- Town
- Location of Akplabanya in Greater Accra Region
- Coordinates: 5°47′22″N 0°21′20″E
- Country: Ghana
- Region: Greater Accra Region
- District: Ada West District

Population
  - Total: —
- Time zone: GMT
  - Summer (DST): GMT

Akplabanya is a fishing community in the Ada West District in the Greater Accra Region of Ghana. The Akplabanya lagoon is located in the community.
