= Ministry of Roads and Highways (Ghana) =

Government ministry of Ghana

Coordinates: 5.553075°N 0.201264°W

Ministry of Roads and Highways, Ghana

Agency overview
- Formed: 1997
- Jurisdiction: Ghana
- Headquarters: Ghana
- Minister responsible: Hon. Kwame Governs Agbodza
- Child agencies: Ghana Highways Authority; Department of Urban Roads; Department of Feeder Roads; Ghana Road Fund Secretariat
- Website: Official website

The Ministry of Roads and Highways (MRH) is an agency of the Government of Ghana responsible for formulating policies, coordinating sector performance, monitoring and evaluating road infrastructure, development, financing, road construction and road maintenance in Ghana.

== Structure ==
MRH is made up of 8 Directorates and 5 Units. In addition, the Ghana Road Fund Secretariat and the Koforidua Training Center (KTC) are under the Ministry. 2 Departments and 1 Authority under the Ministry.

MRH STRUCTURE
DIRECTORATES	UNITS	AGENCIES	DEPARTMENTS	AUTHORITIES
Administration	Legal	Ghana Road Fund Secretariat	Department of Feeder Roads	Ghana Highway Authority
Policy & Planning	Public Relations	Koforidua Training Center (KTC)	Department of Urban Roads	
Public Private Partnerships	Protocol			
Human Resource Management and Development	Client Service			
Monitoring & Evaluation	Internal Audit			
Procurement				
Finance				
Research, Statistics & Information Management				

The Department of Feeder Roads is responsible for the road construction and road maintenance of feeder roads in Ghana, and the Department of Urban Roads is responsible for the road construction and road maintenance of urban roads in Ghana. Ghana Highways Authority; in charge of the trunk roads in Ghana.

- Department of Urban Roads
- Department of Feeder Roads
- Ghana Road Fund Secretariat; in charge of the management of the day-to-day activities of the Road Fund under the direction of the secretary of the Road Fund Board.

== Vision ==
The vision of the Ministry of Roads and Highways is to provide and maintain an integrated, cost-effective, safe and sustainable road transport network responsive to the needs of users, supporting growth and poverty reduction.

== Mission ==
The mission of the ministry is to formulate the requisite policies, monitor and evaluate programmes and projects to ensure the provision of affordable, integrated, safe, responsive and sustainable road transport network that will meet the economic, social and environmental needs as well as national and international standards.
