= Apedwa =

Town in Eastern Region, Ghana

Coordinates: 6°08′N 0°30′W

- Urban area
- Nickname: Apcity
- Motto: Land with peace
- Location within Ghana
- Country: Ghana
- Region: Eastern Region
- District: East Akim District
- Time zone: GMT
  - Summer (DST): GMT

Apedwa is a town in the East Akim District of the Eastern Region of Ghana.
