= Bunso =

Bunso: The youngest
- Directed by: Ditsi Carolino
- Produced by: Ditsi Carolino
- Cinematography: Sadhana Buxani; Ditsi Carolino
- Edited by: Emile Guertin
- Music by: Gary Granada
- Release date: February 22, 2005 (Pelikula at Lipunan Film Festival)
- Running time: 64 minutes
- Country: Philippines
- Languages: Filipino; English

Bunso (The Youngest) is a documentary by Filipino filmmakers Ditsi Carolino and Nana Buxani.

== Plot ==
Three boys, Tony, 13, Diosel, and Bunso, 11, are struggling to survive in a crowded Cebu Provincial Detention and Rehabilitation Center in Cebu, alongside adult rapists and murderers. The two street-smart boys paint a picture of the world of children caught between extreme poverty and the law.

== Release ==
Bunso was shown in December 2004 on a limited screening. In November 2004, it had its offshore world premiere at the International Documentary Film Festival Amsterdam in the Netherlands where it was shown as part of the non-competition Reflecting Images section.

== Awards ==
Ditsi Carolino received the Best Director award for the documentary film Bunso (The Youngest) at the OneWorld 2005 documentary films festival held in Prague, Czech Republic.

- Best Director—One World Film Festival, Prague
- Grand Prix—EBS International Documentary Festival, Seoul
- Youth Jury Prize—Perspektive - Filmfestival der Menschenrechte, Nuremberg
- Best Short Film, Gawad Urian
