= Ayanfuri =

- Town
- Location in Ghana
- Coordinates: 5.964302°N 1.895235°W
- Country: Ghana
- Region: Central Region
- Elevation: 249 ft (76 m)

Ayanfuri is a mining town in the Central Region of Ghana. The town is the termination town on the 94.4-kilometre (58.7 mi) Tarkwa-Bogoso-Ayamfuri road.
