= Yamoransa =

Coordinates: 5°10′N 1°12′W

- Urban area
- Location within Ghana
- Country: Ghana
- Region: Central Region
- Time zone: GMT
  - Summer (DST): GMT

Yamoransa is a small town near Cape Coast in the Central Region of Ghana It lies along the main international road that connects Kumasi-Cape Coast or (Burkina Faso-Ivory Coast) and Accra-Cape Coast or (Togo-Ivory Coast). It is a developing community with different economic activities. Notable of these is the kenkey (a food prepared from corn) and bread trades by most of the women of the community mostly around their main Lorry Station. The community has about 5 private and 3 public basic schools with 1 Private Senior High School and 1 Vocational School. Yamoransa Kojokrom enstools Chief and Sumankwahene of Nkusukum Area, Nana Mensah III on the 19th February 2022
