= Menji, Ghana =

Town in Bono region, Ghana

Coordinates: 7°55′34″N 2°22′55″W

Menji is a town located in the Tain District of Bono Region, Ghana.
