= Dabala =

Coordinates: 5°59′N 0°41′E

- Interactive map of Dabala
- Country: Ghana
- Region: Volta Region

Dabala is a town in the Volta Region of Ghana. The town is known for the Dabala Secondary Technical School. The school is a second cycle institution.
