= Tetteh Quarshie Interchange =

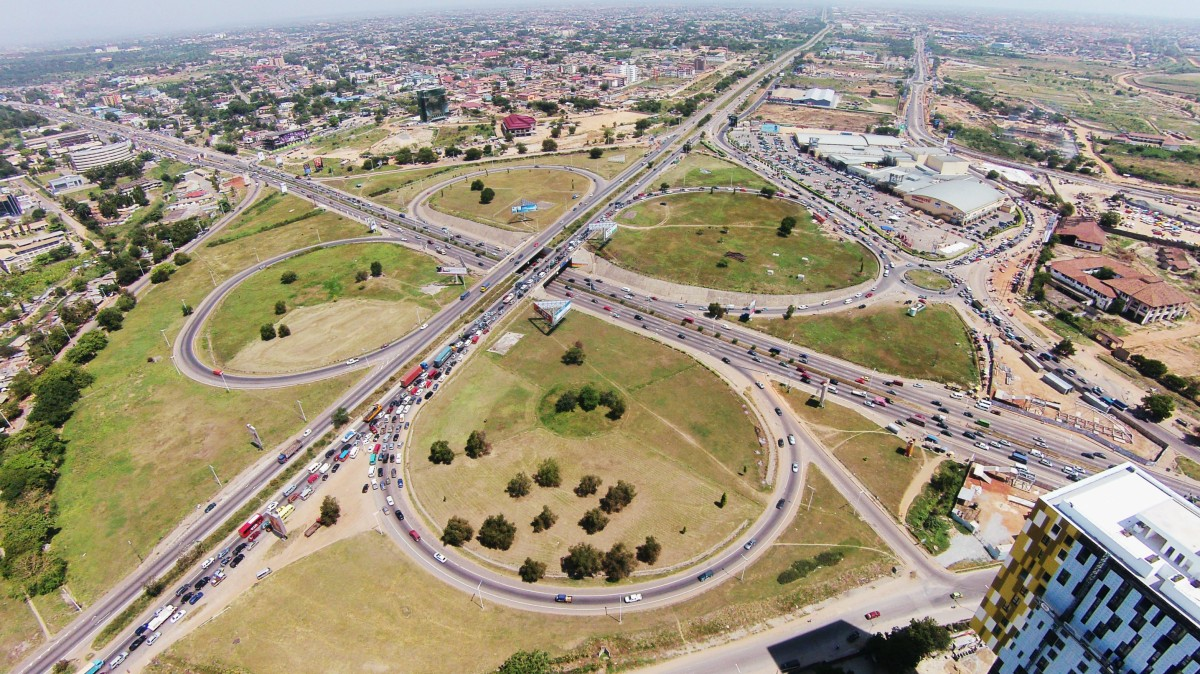
- drone view
- Interactive map of Tetteh Quarshie Interchange

Location
- Accra, Ghana
- Coordinates: 5°37′22″N 0°10′34″W
- Roads at junction: Tema Motorway; Liberation Road; Legon East Road

Construction
- Type: Cloverleaf interchange
- Constructed: January 2003
- Opened: 27 February 2005

The Tetteh Quarshie Interchange is a cloverleaf interchange carrying a six-lane motorway that links the Liberation Road from 37 Military Hospital to the Pantang junction through Madina in Accra, Ghana. The interchange was commissioned for vehicular use on 27 February 2005 by then president of Ghana, John Agyekum Kufuor.

== History ==
In 2003, the Government of Ghana initiated the expansion of the then Akuafo Circle. The circle was the largest roundabout in Ghana. The sod cutting for the project was done by John Kufuor on 17 January 2003. The project was to restructure it into an interchange to handle the huge vehicular traffic. The contract for the project was won by Messrs. SONITRA-RCCN Joint Ventures. The interchange was open to vehicular traffic on 27 February 2005 and was completed on 5 May 2005. The interchange was the second to have been built in Ghana, after the Sankara Interchange (now Ako Adjei Interchange).

== Financing ==
The interchange cost 8 million cedis (5 million dollars). It was funded by the African Development Bank.

== Architecture of the interchange ==
The interchange includes a bridge on the motorways, three-lane dual carriageway. Four loops and four slip boards to ease the movement onto the flyover.

== Linkages ==
The interchange is linked to several road networks. The various roads the feed to the interchange bring vehicular traffic from all over Accra. The roads that link to the interchange are the Liberation Road, which brings vehicles from Legon to Accra.
