= N1 road (Ghana) =

Road in Ghana

National Highway 1

Route information
- Part of Trans-African Highway Route 7
- Maintained by Ghana Highways Authority
- Length: 335.54 mi (540.00 km)

Major junctions
- West end: N12 at Elubo; 5°17′23.7″N 2°47′05.6″W
- R19 at Mpataba; R88 at Esiama; R86 at Abra; R84 at Agona; R82 at Cape Coast; N8 at Yamoransa; R80 at Saltpond; IR1 at Mankessim; R62 at Apam Junction; R17 at Ojobi Junction; IR2 at Winneba; R15 at Nyanyano; N6 at Mallam, Accra; N4 at Tetteh Quarshie Interchange, Accra; N2 at Tema; R13 at Dawhenya; R18 at Sege; R11 at Kase; R16 at Dabala; R12 / R14 at Akatsi; R10 / R11 at Denu
- East end: Aflao06°06′47.3″N 01°11′57.8″E

Location
- Country: Ghana
- Major cities: Sekondi-Takoradi, Cape Coast, Winneba, Accra, Tema, Sogakope

Highway system
- Ghana Road Network
← R204	→ N2

The N1 or National Highway 1 is a national highway in Ghana that begins at the border with Ivory Coast at Elubo and runs through Sekondi-Takoradi, Cape Coast, Winneba, Accra and Tema to the border with Togo at Aflao. It is the main highway along the coast of the country, with a total distance of 540 kilometers (335.5 miles). The route runs through the Western, Central, Greater Accra and Volta regions of Ghana.

The route, which forms part of the Trans-African Highway network (Route 7), links the A100 road in Ivory Coast to the N2 in Togo, completing the stretch of the Dakar - Lagos route.

== Route ==
Major towns and cities along the route of the N1 include Elubo, Sekondi-Takoradi, Cape Coast, Yamoransa, Winneba, Kasoa, Accra, Tema, Dawhenya, Aveyime-Battor, Kase, Dabala, Akatsi, Denu, Sogakope, and Aflao.

=== Western Region ===
The N1 begins at the border with Ivory Coast at Elubo and proceeds southeast through the town of Esiama, where the road splits and the N1 continues east to Apemenyim. The route veers south at Agona, where it intersects with the R84 before continuing on through downtown Sekondi-Takoradi. At the Market Circle, the N1 continues north along the Cape Coast - Takoradi road to Nkwanta, where it crosses into the Central Region.

=== Central Region ===
In the Central Region, the N1 turns back toward the coast through Elmina. At Cape Coast, the route veers north toward Yamoransa, where it splits into two separate routes - the northbound N8 and the eastbound N1 along the coast. The N1 meets the R80 at Mankessim, where it continues east to the R62 junction at Winneba. After Winneba, the N1 continues east through Kasoa, entering the Greater Accra Region at Ngleshi-Amanfro.

=== Greater Accra Region ===
From Ngleshi-Amanfro, the N1 continues east through Mallam in Accra, where it turns north and continues as a six-lane motorway for 14 km (8.7 mi) as the George Walker Bush Motorway. At Nsawam road, it meets the N6, which runs north toward Kumasi. The N1 continues east toward the Tetteh Quarshie Interchange, where it intersects with the northbound N4 and continues as a four-lane motorway for 19 km (12 mi) as the Kwame Nkrumah Motorway. At the Motorway Roundabout, the N1 splits into two - the northbound N2 and eastbound N1. It then continues northeast through Kasseh, where it veers sharply north through Kpotame Tefleh and crosses the Volta River into the Volta Region.

=== Volta Region ===
In the Volta Region, the N1 continues begins at Sogakope and continues east until Akatsi, where it turns south toward the coast through Afife and Klikor-Agbozume. At Tokor, the N1 branches south into Denu and continues to the border town of Aflao, where it crosses into Togo as the Togolese N2 route.

== See also ==
- Ghana Road Network
