= Larabanga =

Town in Savannah Region, Ghana

Larabanga لارابانجا
- Town
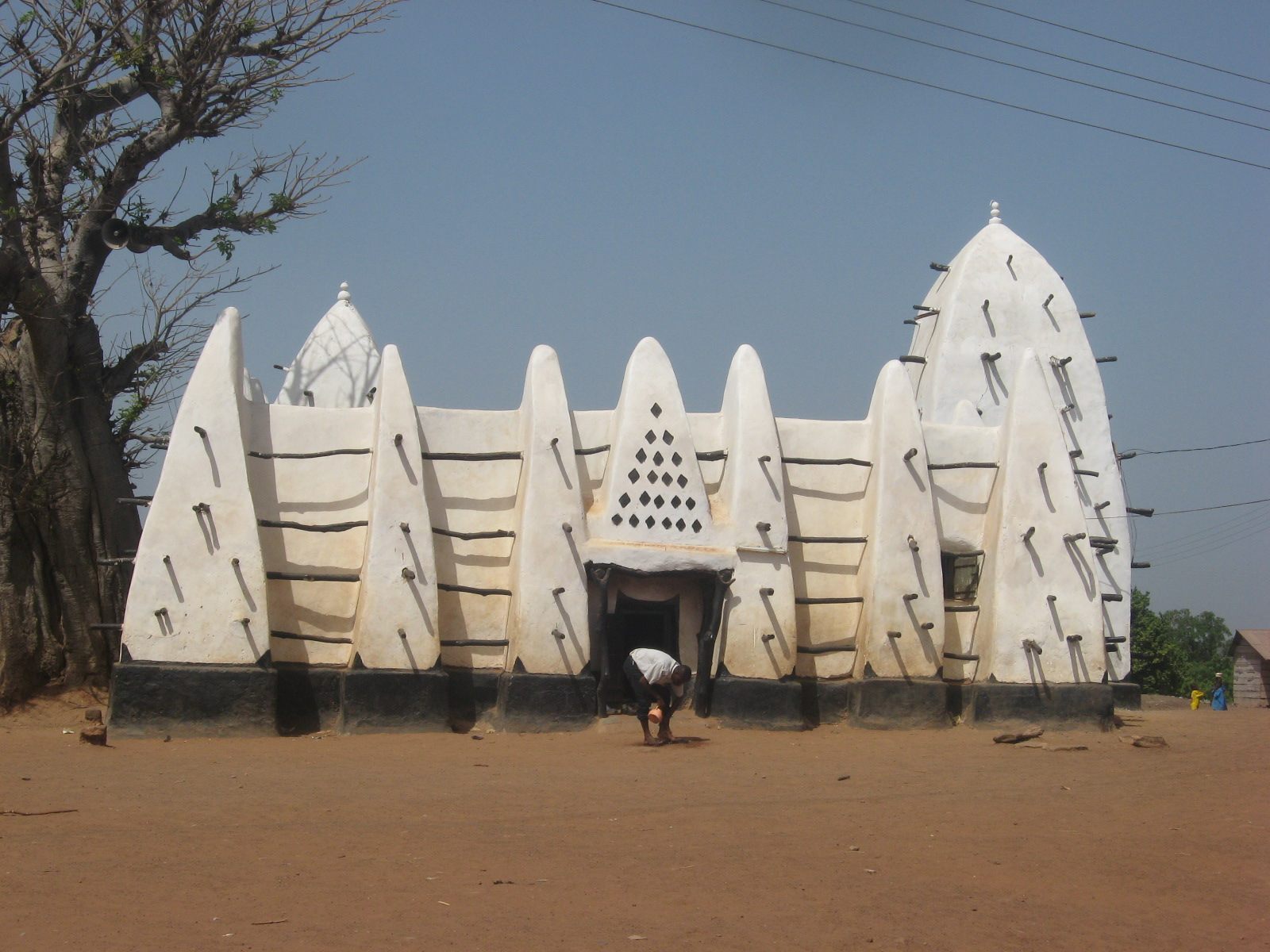
- Larabanga Mosque

- Location in Ghana
- Coordinates: 9°13′N 1°51′W
- Country: Ghana
- Region: Savannah Region
- District: West Gonja District
- Time zone: GMT
  - Summer (DST): GMT

Larabanga (Arabic: لارابانجا) is a town in West Gonja district, a district in the Savannah Region of Ghana. It is known for its whitewashed adobe Sahelian mosque and it is called Larabanga Mosque, said to date from 1421, and which, having been built at the height of the trans-Saharan trade, is reputed to be Ghana's oldest mosque and houses a copy of the Qur'an almost as old. The Larabanga Mosque is also referred to as 'Mecca of West Africa'

The Town is also known for its Mystic Stone, for its patterned vernacular architecture, and as the entrance to the Mole National Park.

== Mystic Stone ==
According to popular lore, while under British rule in the 1950s, a road was being built at Larabanga by officials who found a mysterious stone in their way. The contractors paving the road removed the stone three times, only to find that it had moved back to its original location the next day. The decision was then made to change the direction of the road. The stone became known as the Mystic Stone or Wish Stone, and is a local tourist attraction and site of worship believed to have healing properties.

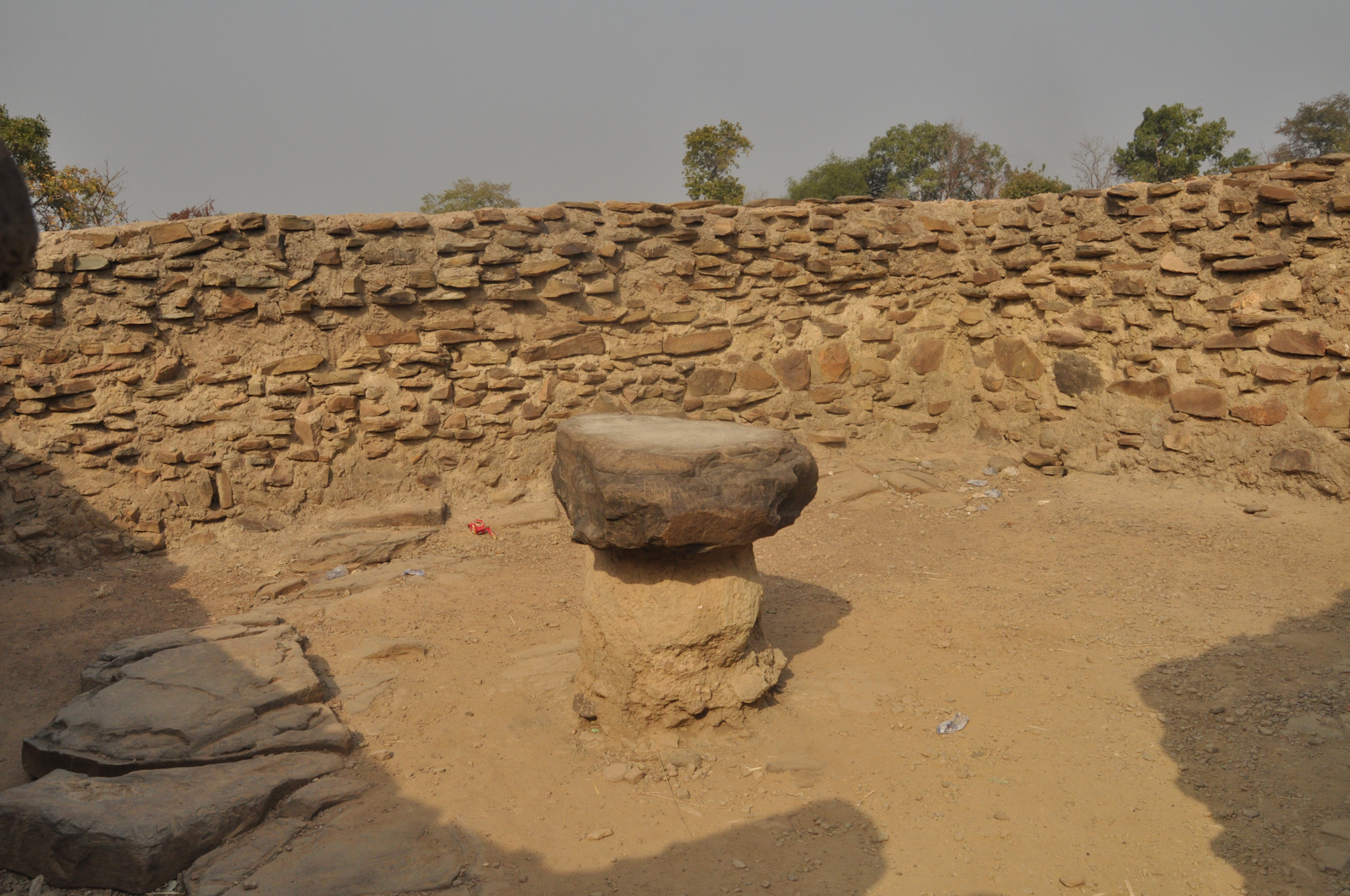
Mystic Stone near Larabanga Mosque
