= Sawla, Ghana =

Sawla
- District Capital
- Location of Sawla in Savannah Region
- Coordinates: 9°17′N 2°25′W
- Country: Ghana
- Region: Savannah Region
- District: Sawla-Tuna-Kalba District

Government
- Elevation: 331 m (1,086 ft)

Population (2017)
  - Total: 10,555
- Time zone: GMT
  - Summer (DST): GMT

Sawla is a small town in the Savannah Region of Ghana. It is also the capital of Sawla-Tuna-Kalba district.

== Transport ==
=== Train ===
Sawla is on the route of a proposed railway to Hamile.

== Education ==
- Sawla Senior High School

== Climate ==
Climate data for Sawla, Ghana
Month	Jan	Feb	Mar	Apr	May	Jun	Jul	Aug	Sep	Oct	Nov	Dec	Year
Mean daily maximum °C (°F)	38 (100)	39 (102)	40 (104)	39 (102)	36 (97)	34 (93)	31 (88)	29 (84)	30 (86)	33 (91)	36 (97)	37 (99)	35 (95)
Mean daily minimum °C (°F)	20 (68)	23 (73)	26 (79)	26 (79)	24 (75)	23 (73)	22 (72)	22 (72)	22 (72)	23 (73)	23 (73)	22 (72)	23 (73)
Average precipitation mm (inches)	0 (0)	25 (1.0)	49 (1.9)	88 (3.5)	123 (4.8)	140 (5.5)	206 (8.1)	365 (14.4)	306 (12.0)	140 (5.5)	16 (0.6)	1 (0.0)	1,459 (57.3)
Average precipitation days	0	1	2	4	4	7	11	15	16	8	1	0	69
Average relative humidity (%)	17	27	43	52	62	71	78	83	84	73	50	23	55
Mean monthly sunshine hours	371	337	365	353	354	320	275	258	279	350	358	371	3,991
Average ultraviolet index	8	8	8	7	7	6	6	6	6	7	8	7	7
