= Elubo =

Town in Western Region, Ghana

- Town
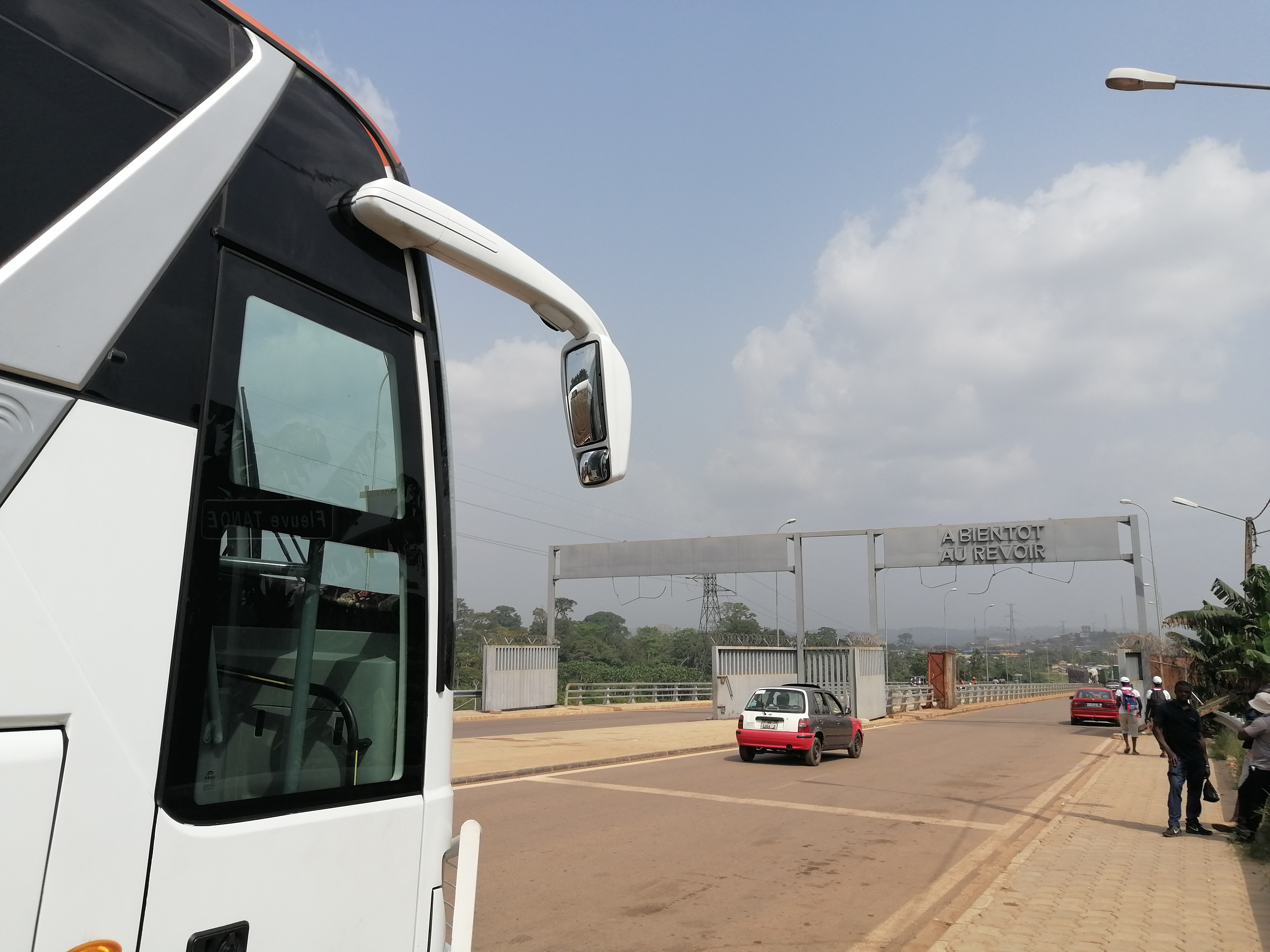
- Vehicles driving by the Ghana–Ivory Coast border

- Location of Elubo in Western Region
- Coordinates: 05°17′00″N 02°46′00″W
- Country: Ghana
- Region: Western Region
- District: Jomoro District
- Elevation: 46 ft (14 m)

Population
  - Ethnicity: Akan; Nzema; Fantis; Ewe
  - Religions: Christian; Islamic; Traditionalist
- Time zone: GMT
  - Summer (DST): GMT
- Postal code: WJ
- Area code: 031 22
- climate: Am
- Website: jma.gov.gh

Elubo is a town in the Jomoro district, a district in the Western Region of Ghana, and is located near the border with the Ivory Coast. The 2021 census indicates that Elubo has a settlement population of 23,952 people. The current Omanhene of Elubo is Nana Kesse Panyin III.

== Administration ==
The town has a mayor–council form of government. The mayor (executive chief) is appointed by the president of Ghana and approved by the town council, the Jomoro Municipal Assembly. The current mayor of Elubo and the district as a whole is Louisa Iris Arde.

== Demographics ==
The town, along with the district as a whole, are predominantly religious making up 92% of the population with the largest religions being Christianity (84.1), Islam (7.3%), and traditional religions (1.2%). The largest ethnic groups who resided in the town are the Akan, Nzema, and Ewe.

== Economy ==
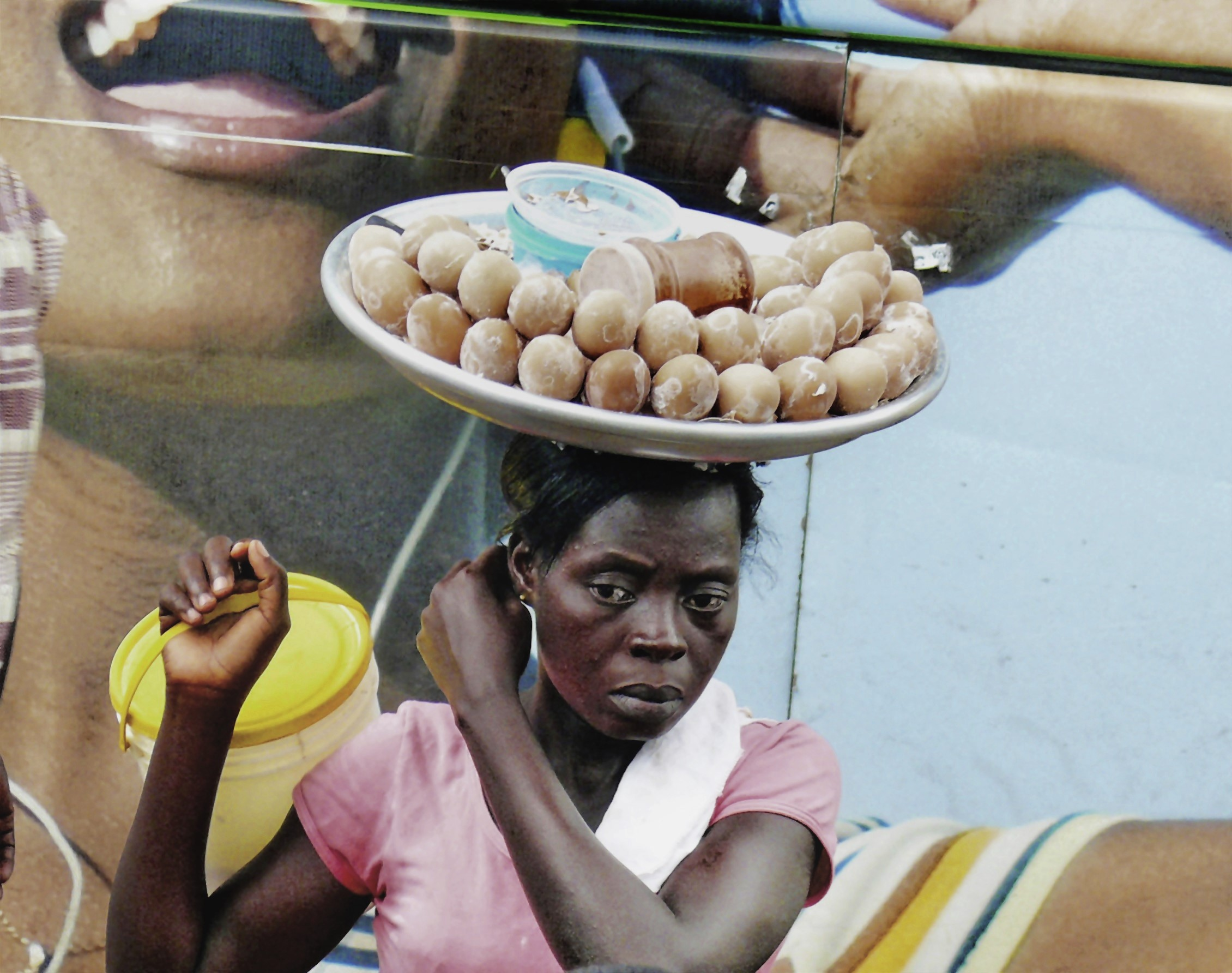
A trader selling eggs near the Ghanaian-Ivorian border

The biggest economic sector of the town is agriculture, employing most of the labour force. Other major economic sectors include trade and commerce. Some of the residents depends on the traffic between the border crossing to make a living.

== Culture ==
The Omanhene, or paramount chief, of Elubo is Nana Kesse Panyin III.

== Geography ==
=== Location ===
Elubo is a town located in the Jomoro Municipal District, which has a total land area of 1,495 km^{2} (577 sq mi). The district bordered the Aowin municipal district to the north, the Wassa Amenfi West Municipal District towards the northeast, Ivory Coast to the west, the Gulf of Guinea to the south and the Ellembelle District towards the east. The town is located near the border and is home to a border crossing.

At the crossing of the border with Ivory Coast, the prominent types of transportation include: trucks, canoes (through the Tano River), state-owned buses, and privatively-owned trucks.

=== Climate ===
The town has a Tropical monsoon climate (Köppen climate classification: Am), experiencing two rainy seasons with a high amount of annual rainfall. The monthly mean maximum temperature ranges around 26 °C (79 °F) while the relative humidity peaks at 90% in the night and drops to around 75% during the afternoon.

== Healthcare ==
The town is home to a port health unit, a facility under the Port Health Directorate (division of the Ghana Health Service) which helps to handle public health emergencies at Ghana's land border crossings.

== See also ==
- Ghana–Ivory Coast border
