= Adenta =

- district Capital
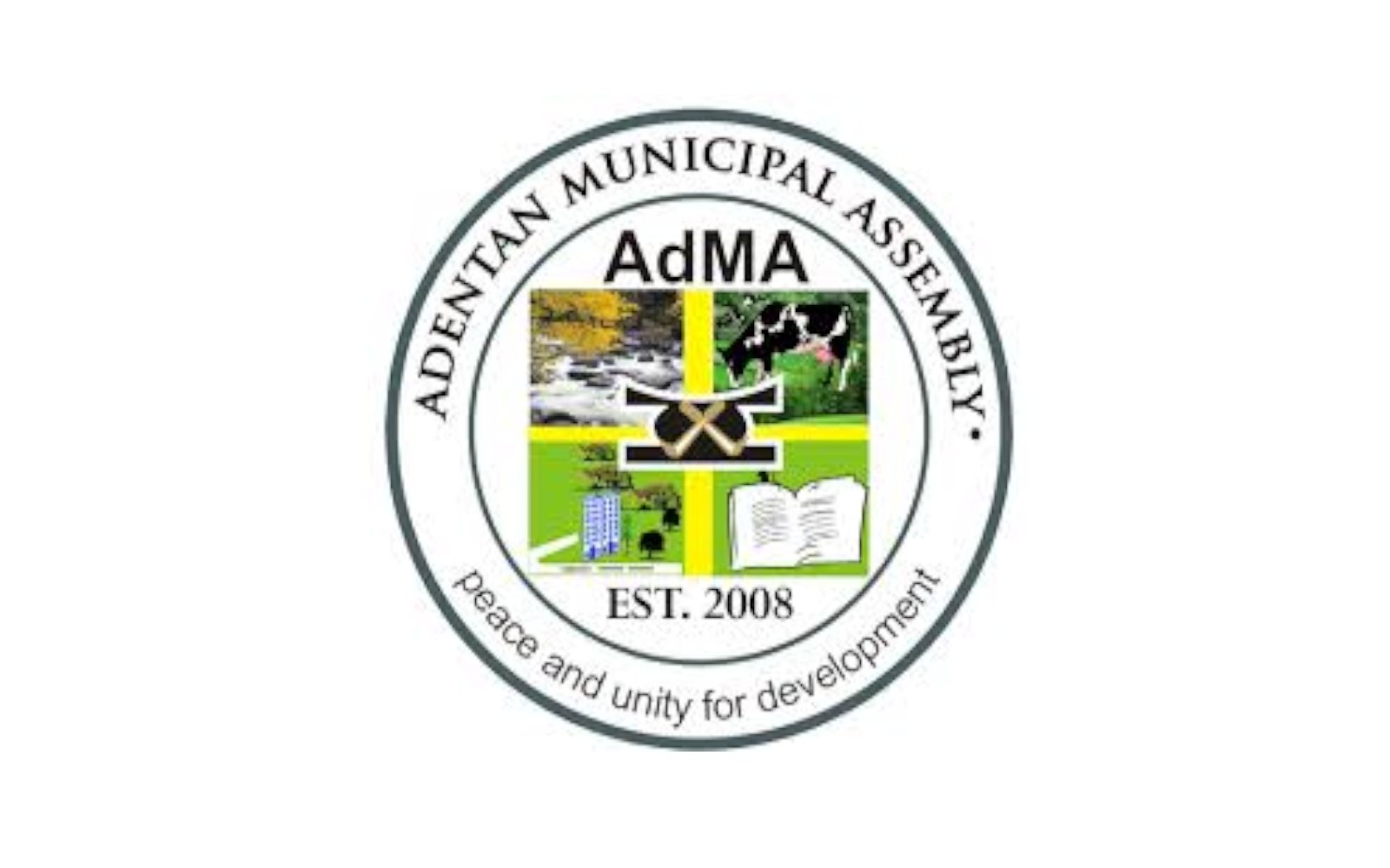
- Flag

- Location in Ghana
- Coordinates: 5°42′25″N 0°10′15″W
- Country: Ghana
- Region: Greater Accra Region
- District: Adenta Municipal District

Adenta is a small town and is the capital of Adenta Municipal district, a district in the Greater Accra Region of Ghana. The town is known for the West Africa Secondary School. The school is a second cycle institution. It is also known for the SSNIT (Social Security and National Insurance Trust) Housing. It is located on the Accra - Aburi Highway after Madina.
