= Kpong =

Coordinates: 6°10′N 0°04′E

- Urban area
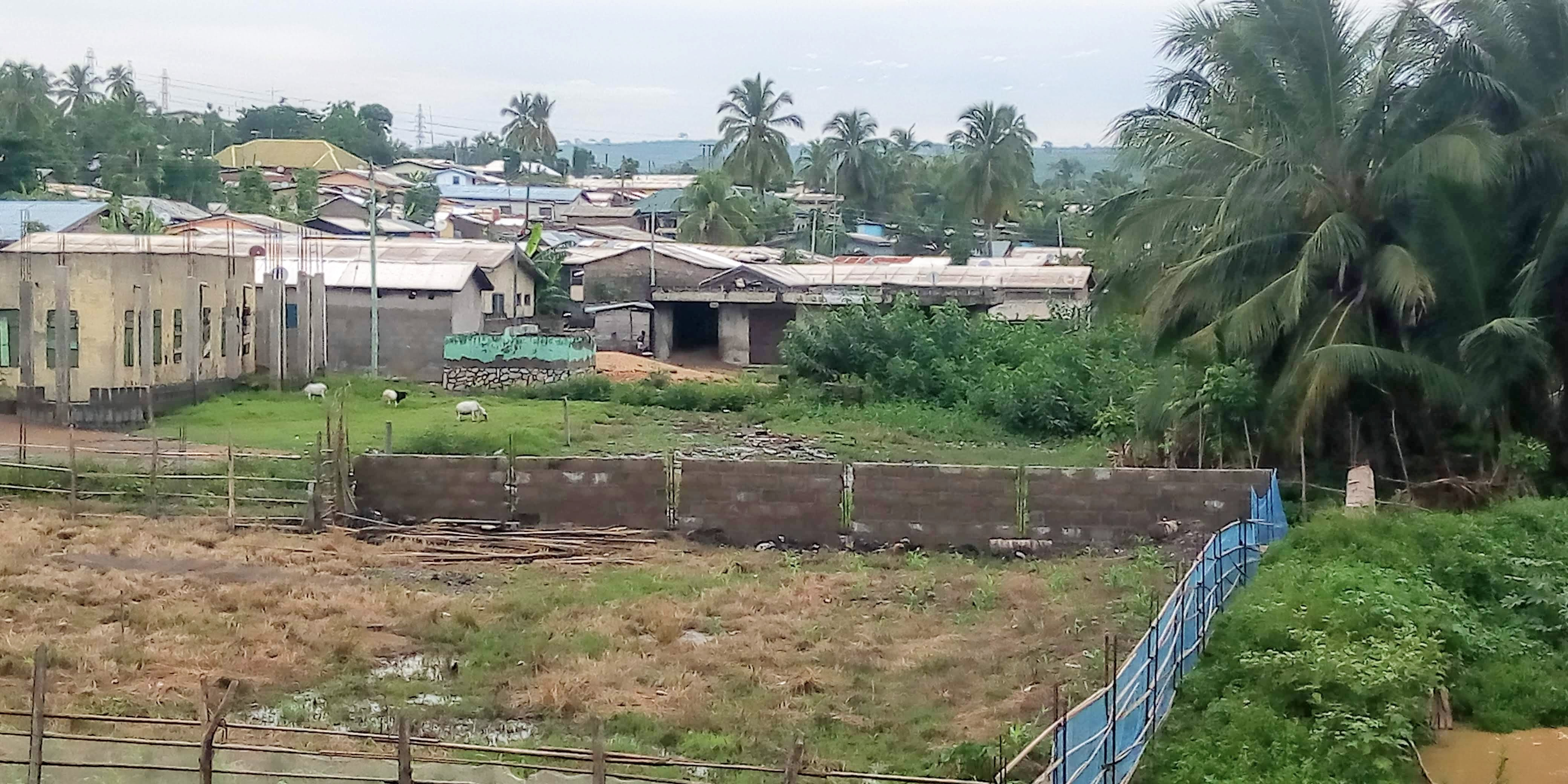
- Houses in Kpong

- Location within Ghana
- Country: Ghana
- Region: Eastern Region
- District: Lower Manya Krobo District
- Time zone: GMT
  - Summer (DST): GMT

Kpong is a town in the Lower Manya Krobo District of the Eastern Region of Ghana and particularly noted for the Kpong Dam
