= Fume, Ghana =

Town in Volta Region, Ghana

Fume
- Town
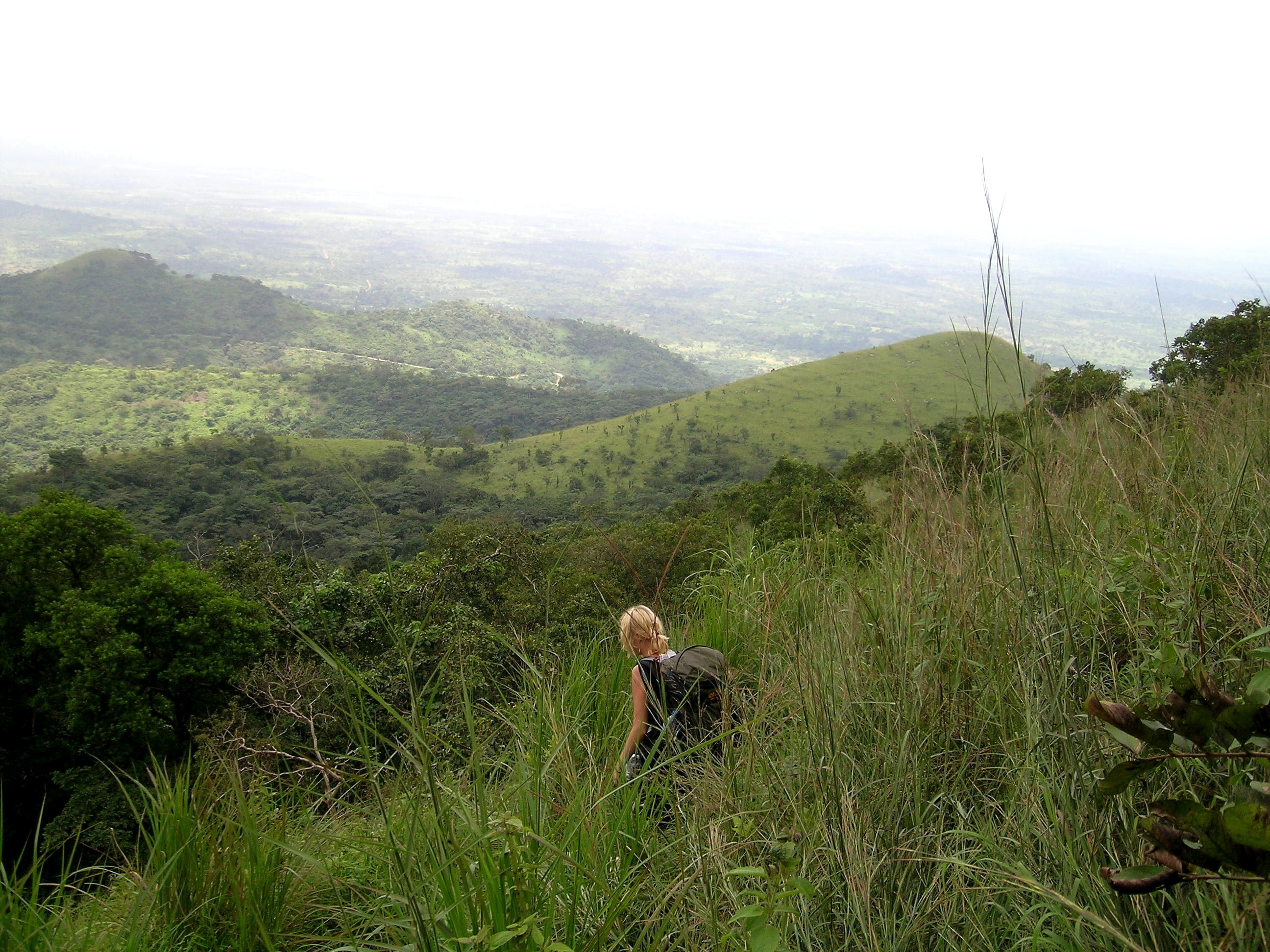
- Hill country near Fume

- Location of Fume in Volta Region
- Coordinates: 06°52′19.78″N 00°25′4.19″E
- Country: Ghana
- Region: Volta Region
- District: Ho West District
- Time zone: UTC0 (GMT)

Fume-Avatime (also known as Avatime-Fume) is a town in the Ho West District in the Volta Region of Ghana. The town is located on the Eastern Corridor highway. It is one of the seven communities of Avatime which celebrate the Amu Festival. The Kulungu Waterfall is located at Fume.
