= N10 road (Ghana) =

National highway in Ghana

National Highway 10

Route information
- Maintained by Ghana Highways Authority
- Length: 578 km (359 mi)

Major junctions
- South end: N6 N8 at Kumasi
- North end: N11 at Bolgatanga, N13 at Navrongo

Location
- Country: Ghana

Highway system
- Ghana Road Network
← N9	→ N11

The N10 or National Highway 10 is a national highway in Ghana that begins at Kumasi and runs north to Burkina Faso, where it turns into the N5 of Burkina Faso. This makes it to one of the most important economical connections to Burkina Faso. At Tamale the N10 intersects with N9. At Bolgatanga the N10 intersects with N11. The N10 spans a distance of 578 kilometers.

== Route ==
Major towns and cities along the route of the N10 include Kumasi, Techiman, Tamale, Bolgatanga, Navrongo and Paga.

== See also ==
- Ghana Road Network
