= Denu =

Denu Adafienu Denu
- District capital
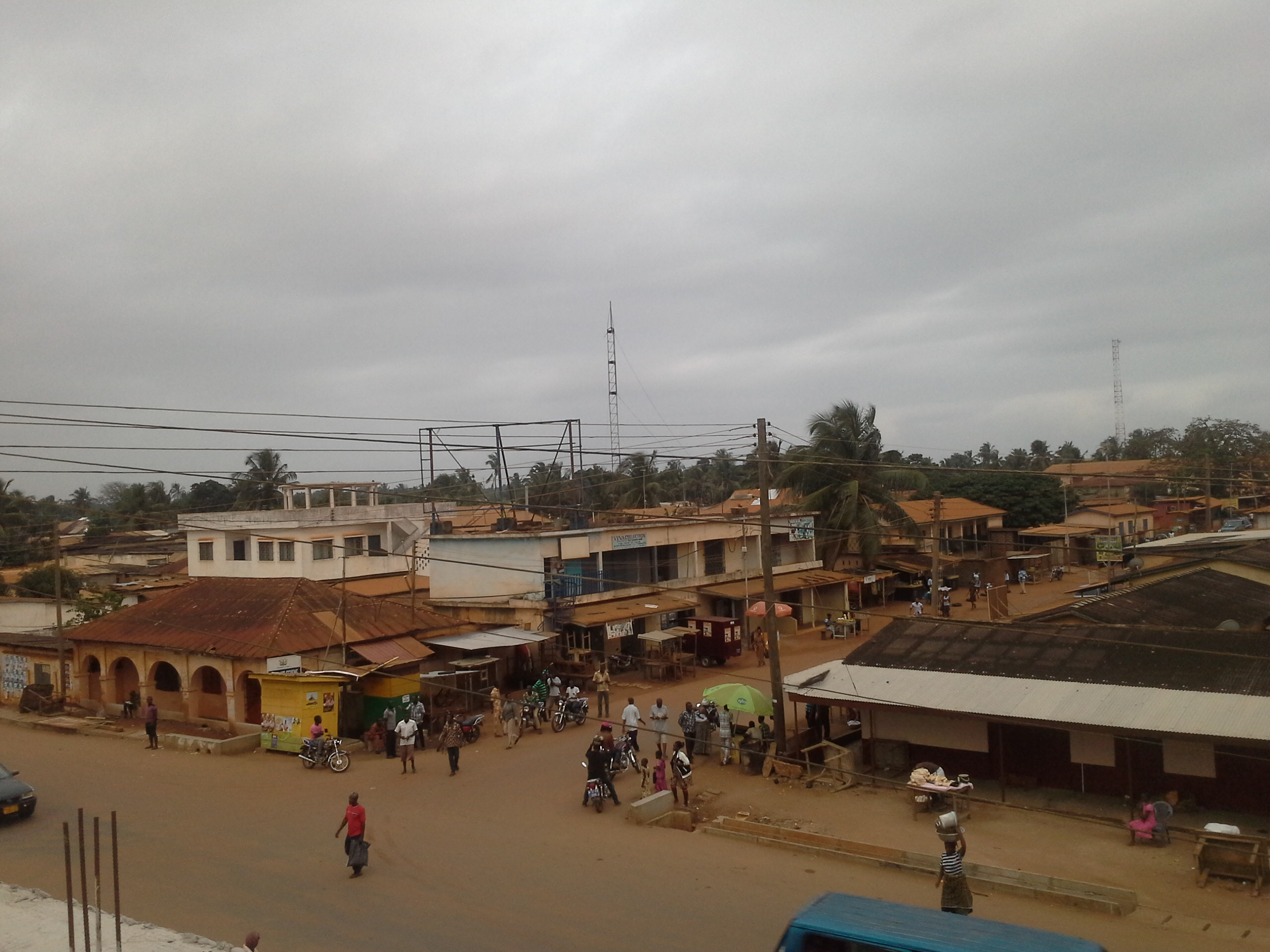
- Aerial view of Denu junction

- Location of Denu in Ghana
- Coordinates: 06°06′04″N 01°08′52″E
- Country: Ghana
- Region: Volta Region
- District: Ketu South Municipal
- Elevation: 8 m (26 ft)
- Time zone: GMT
  - Summer (DST): GMT
- Area code: +233 36 25

Denu is a small town which is the capital of Ketu South Municipal, a district on the south-eastern corner of the Volta Region of Ghana, next to Aflao the border town with Togo. The name Denu literally means by the boundary. The town is sandwiched between the sea and lagoon on its south and north respectively.

== See also ==
- Ketu South (Ghana parliament constituency)
