= Ghana Highways Authority =

Ghana Highway Authority
Agency overview
- Formed: 1974
- Preceding agency: Public Works Department
- Headquarters: Accra
- Parent agency: Ministry of Roads and Highways

The Ghana Highway Authority (GHA) was established as a corporate body by GHA Degree 1974 (NRCD 298). NRCD 298 was repealed by the GHA Act 1997 (Act 540), which, however, continued the Authority in existence with responsibility for the administration, control, development, and maintenance of the trunk road network in Ghana. This totals 13,367 km (8,306 mi) of highways and related facilities which make up about 33% of Ghana's total road network of 40,186 km (24,970 mi) as of 2013.

== Departments ==
All the Divisions of the Authority are grouped under three main Departments, namely:

- Administration Department
- Development Department
- Maintenance Department

== Administration Department ==
This Department embraces 7 Divisions, namely:

- Finance
- Human Resource
- Legal Service
- Training & Development
- Public Affairs
- MIS Division

There is an Internal Audit Division, that is directly responsible to the Chief Executive but which for administration purposes, reports to the Deputy Chief Executive (Administration).

== Development Department ==
This Department embraces 7 Divisions, namely:

- Road Safety and Environment
- Planning
- Materials
- Contracts
- Quantity Surveying
- Survey and Design
- Bridges

The Head of this Department is the Deputy Chief Executive for Development.

== Maintenance Department ==
This Department embraces:

- Road Maintenance
- Regional Offices (10 in all, one in each region)
- Plant and Equipment

== See also ==
- Ghana Road Network
