= Maluwe Mosque =

Mosque in Savannah Region, Ghana

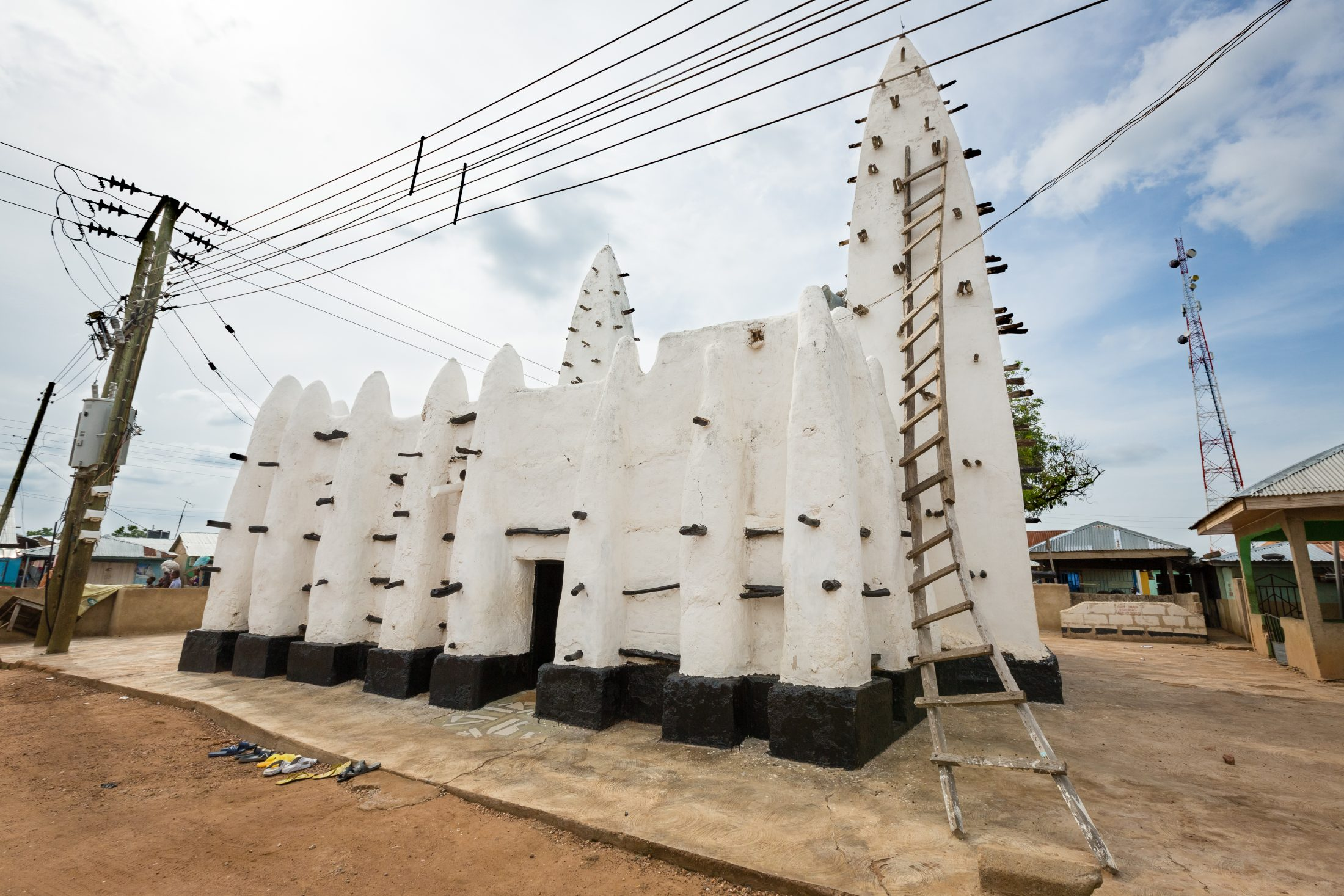

- Location within Ghana

Religion
- Affiliation: Islam
- Ecclesiastical or organizational status: Mosque
- Status: Active

Location
- Location: West Gonja, Savannah
- Country: Ghana
- Interactive map of Maluwe Mosque
- Coordinates: 8°40′10″N 2°17′29″W

Architecture
- Type: Mosque

Specifications
- Minaret: 2
- Materials: Adobe

The Maluwe Mosque is a mosque located on the Bole road in the West Gonja District in the Savannah region of Ghana. Maluwe is a small village east of Bui National Park.

== Overview ==
According to an imam of the mosque, it was built by a Muslim missionary from Mali. He built five adobe mosques as he passed through the region along the way.

The Maluwe Mosque was built with adobe in the Sudano-Sahelian style and has two pyramid-like minarets that are also taller than Bole Mosque but does not reach the heights of Banda Nkwanta Mosque. The mosque has larger parapets than the Larabanga Mosque. It also has two buttresses on the west side which are thicker and box-shaped.

== See also ==
- Islam in Ghana
- List of mosques in Ghana
