= Ghana's material cultural heritage =

Museums and monuments in Ghana

The monuments list is taken from the Ghana Museums and Monuments Board, according to their description "legal custodian of Ghana's material cultural heritage (movable and immovable heritage)" GMMB classifies the monuments:

The ID used on this page in reference to the Regions of Ghana are based on the ISO Regional ID standards.

== A. Western Region ==
ID	Description	Region	Original function	Built	Location	Address	Comment	Coordinates	Image
GH-WP-001	Fort Apollonia	Western	Fort	1765 and 1771	Beyin			4°45′00″N 2°01′00″W	Upload Photo
GH-WP-002	Fort Saint Anthony	Western	Fort	1515; expanded in 1642 and 1872 by Dutch	Axim			4°52′02″N 2°14′23″W	Upload Photo
GH-WP-003	Fort Groß Friedrichsburg	Western	Fort	1683	Princestown		article only in german	4°47′28″N 2°08′02″W	Upload Photo
GH-WP-004	Fort Dorothea	Western	Fort	1684–1687; 1698–1711; April 1712–1717	Akwida			4°45′00″N 2°01′00″W	Upload Photo Upload Photo
GH-AA-005	Museum of Nzema Culture and History	Western	Museum		Fort Apollonia				Upload Photo Upload Photo
GH-WP-005	Fort Metal Cross	Western	Fort	1683	Dixcove			4°47′27″N 1°57′01″W	Upload Photo
GH-WP-006	Fort Batenstein	Western	Fort	Between 1595 and 1600	Butre			4°49′18″N 1°55′16″W	Upload Photo
GH-WP-007	Fort Orange	Western	Fort	1690	Sekondi			4°56′09″N 1°42′26″W	Upload Photo
GH-WP-008	Fort St. Sebastian	Western	Fort	1590	Shama			5°01′45″N 1°37′16″W	Upload Photo
GH-WP-00P	Nzulezu Stilt Settlement	Western	Settlement		Lake Tadane				Upload Photo Upload Photo

== B. Central Region ==
ID	Description	Region	Original function	Built	Location	Address	Comment	Coordinates	Image
GH-CP-001	Fort Komenda	Central	Fort	1957	British Komenda				Upload Photo
GH-CP-002	Fort Vredenburg	Central	Fort		Dutch Komenda				Upload Photo
GH-CP-003	Castle of St. George's	Central	Castle	1482	Elmina		Also known as Elmina Castle	5°05′00″N 1°21′00″W	Upload Photo
GH-AA-003	Cape Coast Castle Museum	Central Region	Museum		Cape Coast		Museum is located within the castle. Photography not allowed there	5°06′12″N 1°14′33″W	Upload Photo
GH-AA-004	Elmina Castle Museum	Central Region	Museum		Elmina			5°05′00″N 1°21′00″W	Upload Photo
GH-CP-004	Fort St. Jago	Central	Fort	1555 and 1558	Elmina			5°05′00″N 1°21′00″W	Upload Photo
GH-CP-005	Fort Goede Hoop a.k.a. Fort Good Hope	Central	Fort	1705	Senya Beraku			5°23′15″N 0°29′23″W	Upload Photo
CE-GH-CP-006	Fort Lijdzaamheid a.k.a. Patience, Leydsaemheyt	Central	Fort	1697	Apam			5°17′36″N 0°44′32″W	Upload Photo
GH-CP-007	Fort Amsterdam (Ghana)	Central	Fort	1631, fort rebuilt by the English in 1645	Abandzi			5°12′09″N 1°05′25″W	Upload Photo
GH-CP-008	The Little Fort	Central	Fort		Anomabu			5°11′12″N 1°06′32″W	Upload Photo
GH-CP-009	Fort William (Ghana) a.k.a. Anomabu Castle	Central	Fort	1640	Anomabu			5°10′00″N 1°07′00″W	Upload Photo
GH-CP-010	Fort Nassau	Central	Fort	1612	Moree			5°08′00″N 1°12′00″W	Upload Photo
GH-CP-011	Fort Fredericksburg	Central	Fort		Amanful			4°52′00″N 1°47′00″W	Upload Photo
GH-CP-012	Cape Coast Castle	Central	Castle	1653	Cape Coast			5°06′18″N 1°14′50″W	Upload Photo
GH-CP-013	Fort McCarthy	Central	Castle	1822	Cape Coast			5°06′N 1°15′W	Upload Photo
GH-CP-014	Fort Victoria	Central	Fort	1712	Cape Coast				Upload Photo
GH-CP-015	Fort William (Lighthouse)	Central	Fort	1753	Cape Coast			5°06′N 1°15′W	Upload Photo
GH-CP-016	Fort Royal	Central	Fort		Cape Coast			5°06′N 1°15′W	Upload Photo Upload Photo
GH-CP-017	Statue of George Ekem Ferguson	Central	Statue		Anomabo, Near Fort Williams				Upload Photo Upload Photo

== C. Greater Accra Region ==
ID	Description	Region	Original function	Built	Location	Address	Comment	Coordinates	Image
GH-AA-001	National Museum	Greater Accra	Museum	1957	Barnes Road, Accra			5°33′24″N 0°12′28″W	Upload Photo
GH-AA-002	Museum of Science & Technology	Greater Accra	Museum	1963	Barnes Road, Accra.		Ghana Museum of Science and Technology		Upload Photo
GH-AA-003	Ussher Fort	Greater Accra	Fort	1649	Ussher Town, Accra				Upload Photo
GH-AA-004	James Fort	Greater Accra	Fort	1673	John Evans Atta Mills High Street, Accra		James Fort Ghana		Upload Photo
GH-AA-05	Christiansborg Castle a.k.a. Osu Castle	Greater Accra	Fort	1659	Osu, Accra				Upload Photo
GH-AA-06	Fort Augustaborg	Greater Accra	Fort	1787	Teshie				Upload Photo
GH-AA-07	Museum of Archaeology	Greater Accra	Museum		University of Ghana, Department of Archeology, Accra				Upload Photo
GH-EP-08	Fort Vernon	Greater Accra	Fort	1742	Prampram			5°43′29″N 0°07′00″E	Upload Photo
GH-EP-09	Holy Trinity Church Accra	Greater Accra	Church	1894	Accra High street				Upload Photo
GH-EP-10	Grave ruins of Seagent Adjetey	Accra	Grave		La		Located at the La cluster of school field		Upload Photo Upload Photo

== E. Volta Region ==
ID	Description	Region	Original function	Built	Location	Address	Comment	Coordinates	Image
GH-TV-001	Fort Prinzenstein	Volta	Fort	1734	Keta			5°54′39″N 0°59′31″E	Upload Photo
GH-TV-002	Volta Regional Museum	Volta	Museum	1973	Ho				Upload Photo

== F. Ashanti Region ==
ID	Description	Region	Original function	Built	Location	Address	Comment	Coordinates	Image
GH-AH-001	Fort Kumasi	Ashanti	Fort	1820	Kumasi				Upload Photo
GH-AH-002	Kumasi Military Museum	Ashanti	Museum		Kumasi				Upload Photo
GH-AH-003	Yaw Tano Shrine a.k.a. Tano Yaw Shrine	Ashanti	Shrine		Ejisu-Besease		at Besease, about 20.8 km on the Kumasi-Accra road.	5°33′26″N 1°11′45″W	Upload Photo
GH-AH-004	Akwasi Sima Shrine a.k.a. Kwasi Kuma Shrine	Ashanti	Shrine		Adarkwa Jachie		about 16 km on the Kumasi-Ejisu road.	6°43′25″N 1°30′41″W	Upload Photo Upload Photo
GH-AH-005	Tano Abenamu Subunu Shrine	Ashanti	Shrine		Abirem (Alternative Spelling: Abirim)		Abirem is about 12.8 km from Kumasi on the Antoa Road, Coord of Antoa Road	6°42′30″N 1°36′20″W	Upload Photo
GH-AH-006	Tano Kwadwo Shrine	Ashanti	Shrine		Saaman		Saaman is about 12.6 km north-east of Kumasi, on the former Odumakoma Tempong road that led toNorthern Ghana.	6°46′15″N 1°32′33″W	Upload Photo
GH-AH-007	Atuo Kosua Shrine	Ashanti	Shrine		Adwinase (Alternative Spelling: Edwenase)		Off the Ejisu-Onwi road.	6°41′19″N 1°26′05″W	Upload Photo
GH-AH-008	Kentinkrono Shrine	Ashanti	Shrine		Kentinkrono		At Kentinkrono, about 20.8km on the Kumasi-Ejisu road.	6°41′36″N 1°33′10″W	Upload Photo
GH-AH-009	Tano Odomankoma Shrine	Ashanti	Shrine		Bogwiase (Alternative Spelling: Bodwease)		foot of the rocky Mampong scarp, about 10 km from Effiduase, in the Sekyere West District.	6°55′04″N 1°20′16″W	Upload Photo Upload Photo
GH-AH-010	Asawase Shrine a.k.a. Tano Banie Shrine	Ashanti	Shrine		Asawase near Ejisu		to the south of Ejisu, about 10 km on the second-class road linking Ejisu and Apromase.	6°41′10″N 1°29′19″W	Upload Photo Upload Photo
GH-AH-011	Asenemaso Shrine	Ashanti	Shrine		Asenemaso		Kumasi-Sunyani road, at a distance of about 15 km from Kejetia.	6°42′16″N 1°43′13″W	Upload Photo Upload Photo

== G. Northern Region ==
ID	Description	Region	Original function	Built	Location	Address	Comment	Coordinates	Image
GH-NP-001	Larabanga Mosque	Northern Region	Mosque	14th Century	Laribanga				Upload Photo
GH-NP-002	Bole Mosque	Northern Region	Mosque				Bole Mosque is in West Gonja District, in the Northern Region.		Upload Photo Upload Photo
GH-NP-003	Babatu's grave	Northern Region	Old Grave		Yendi		Babatu was a notorious slave raider from Niger. There are remains of his grave and some equipment he and his army used in capturing slaves on Grunsi land.		Upload Photo
GH-NP-004	The German cemetery	Northern Region	Cemetery		Yendi		German cemetery popularly called "German grave” contains graves of German and Dutch soldiers who died in their colonization efforts in a war with Dagombas.		Upload Photo
GH-NP-005	Naa Dataa Tua	Northern Region	Cemetery		Yendi		Na Dataa Tua is a site is a place where men who had affairs with the Ya-Na's wives were beheaded. At the site are a sacrificial stone and a baobab tree, at the base of which the victims were beheaded.		Upload Photo Upload Photo
GH-NP-006	Tamale Central Mosque	Northern Region	Mosque		Tamale		The oldest mosque in the Capital of the northern region..		Upload Photo Upload Photo
GH-NP-007	Dakpema tomb	Northern Region	Cemetery		Tamale		The ancient cave where mortal remains of Dakpemas (kings of Tamale kingdom) are kept..		Upload Photo Upload Photo
GH-NP-008	Laribanga Mystery Stone	Northern Region	Mystic stone		Tamale		Larabanga Mystery Stone During the British times, in Ghana there was a road that was laid near the Larabanga Mosque, a stone was removed during the process to make way for the road. The next day, the stone was found again on the same place it was displaced from..		Upload Photo Upload Photo

== H. Upper East ==
ID	Description	Region	Original function	Built	Location	Address	Comment	Coordinates	Image
GH-UE-001	Upper East Regional Museum	Upper East	Museum		Bolgatanga				Upload Photo
GH-UE-002	Old Navrongo Catholic Cathedral Building	Upper East	Church	1920	Navrongo				Upload Photo
GH-UE-003	Pikworo Slave camp	Upper East	Slave camp	1704	Paga				Upload Photo

== hI. Upper West ==
ID	Description	Region	Original function	Built	Location	Address	Comment	Coordinates	Image
GH-UW-001	Gwollu Defence Wall	Upper West	Monument		Gwollu		Gwollu is 70 km north of Wa, in the Upper West Region of Ghana		Upload Photo Upload Photo
GH-UW-003	Wa Naa's Palace	Upper West	Palace		Wa				Upload Photo
GH-UW-003	Wechiau Mosque	Upper West	Mosque		Wechiau				Upload Photo Upload Photo
GH-UW-004	Dondoli Mosque	Upper West	Mosque		Wa		This 19th Century mosque is in Wa, the capital of the Upper West Region.		Upload Photo Upload Photo

=== Archeological Sites ===
The Museum of Archeology, University of Ghana is listed on the QMMB site.
