= List of mosques in Ghana =

This is a list of mosques in Ghana.

Name	Image	Location	Year (CE)	Remarks
Larabanga Mosque		Larabanga, West Gonja	1421	The oldest mosque in Ghana; made of adobe; pyramidal minarets in the Sudano-Sahelian style
Bole Mosque		Bole, West Gonja	17th century	Built in the Sudano-Sahelian style; collapsed in 2023; rebuilt in 2024
Nakore Mosque		Nakore, Wa, Upper West	17th century	Built in the Sudano-Sahelian style
Banda Nkwanta Mosque		Banda Nkwanta, West Gonja	18th century	Made of adobe; pyramidal minarets in the Sudano-Sahelian style
Dondoli Mosque		Wa, Upper West	19th century	In partial ruins; built in the Sudano-Sahelian style
Wuriyanga Mosque		Upper East	19th century	Built in a mix of the Sudano-Sahelian and Djenne styles
Dakrupe Mosque		Dakrupe, Savannah	19th century	Demolished in 2010
Kumasi Central Mosque		Kumasi, Ashanti	1950s	Extensively renovated and expanded in 2023
Madina Mosque		La Nkwantanang Madina, Greater Accra	1959	Also includes a madrasa
Abossey Okai Central Mosque		Abossey Okai, Greater Accra	1970s	
Ghana National Mosque		Accra	2021	The national mosque with a capacity for 15,000 worshipers, the largest mosque in Ghana; principally funded by the Turkish Government
Maluwe Mosque		West Gonja, Savannah		Built in the Sudano-Sahelian style
Sunyani Central Mosque		Sunyani, Bono		
Wechiau Mosque		Wechiau, Upper West		Built in a mix of the Sudano-Sahelian and Djenne styles
Masjid Al-Noor (Tamale)		Wayamba, Northern Region	2026	Built to honour the legacy of Sheikh Adam Issah, father of Mohammed Amin Adam.

== See also ==
- Islam in Ghana
- List of mosques in Africa
