= Dakrupe Mosque =

Mosque in Savannah Region, Ghana

Religion
- Affiliation: Islam (former)
- Ecclesiastical or organizational status: Mosque (19th century–2010)
- Status: Demolished (2010)

Location
- Location: Dakrupe, Savannah
- Country: Ghana
- Interactive map of Dakrupe Mosque

Architecture
- Type: Mosque
- Established: 19th century
- Demolished: 2010

The Dakrupe Mosque was a mosque located in the village of Dakrupe, in the Savannah region of Ghana. Built in the 19th century in the Sudano-Sahelian architectural style, the mosque was demolished in 2010.

== Overview ==
It is claimed the mosque was built in the 19th century and was named after the surrounding neighborhood, that is located between Bole and Larabanga. Situated close to the Larabanga Mosque, the Dakrupe Mosque was similar in style, but smaller in size. It was torn down in 2010 to make room for a larger modern building.

== See also ==
- Islam in Ghana
- List of mosques in Ghana
