= Wuriyanga Mosque =

Mosque in Upper East Region, Ghana

Religion
- Affiliation: Islam
- Ecclesiastical or organizational status: Mosque
- Status: Active

Location
- Location: Upper East
- Country: Ghana
- Interactive map of Wuriyanga Mosque
- Coordinates: 10.8923°N 0.0681°W

Architecture
- Type: Mosque
- Style: Sudano-Sahelian; Djenne
- Established: 19th century

Specifications
- Minaret: 1 (pyramid shape)
- Materials: Adobe

The Wuriyanga Mosque is a mosque in the Upper East region of Ghana. It is located southeast of Bawku and beyond Garu.

== Overview ==
The mosque is believed to have been built in the 19th century. It was claimed the founders of the mosque of Wuriyanga were Mossi Muslims who migrated from the west around the Bobo-Dioulasso area in Burkina Faso. The kusasis named the place 'widiyang' meaning a female horse but have been corrupted to woriyanga. The Mossi of the village built their first mosque which was similar to the style of their homeland.

Made from adobe, the mosque has no exterior buttresses and has only one tower. Like other mosques in northern and Savannah regions of Ghana, the Wuriyanga Mosque is built in the traditional Sudano-Sahelian architectural style with hints of Djenne influence, using local materials and construction techniques. The weight and flat roof of the mosque are supported by very thick load-bearing walls and many columns on the interior. The building is rectangular in shape.

== See also ==
- Islam in Ghana
- List of mosques in Ghana
