= Wechiau Mosque =

Mosque in Upper West Region, Ghana

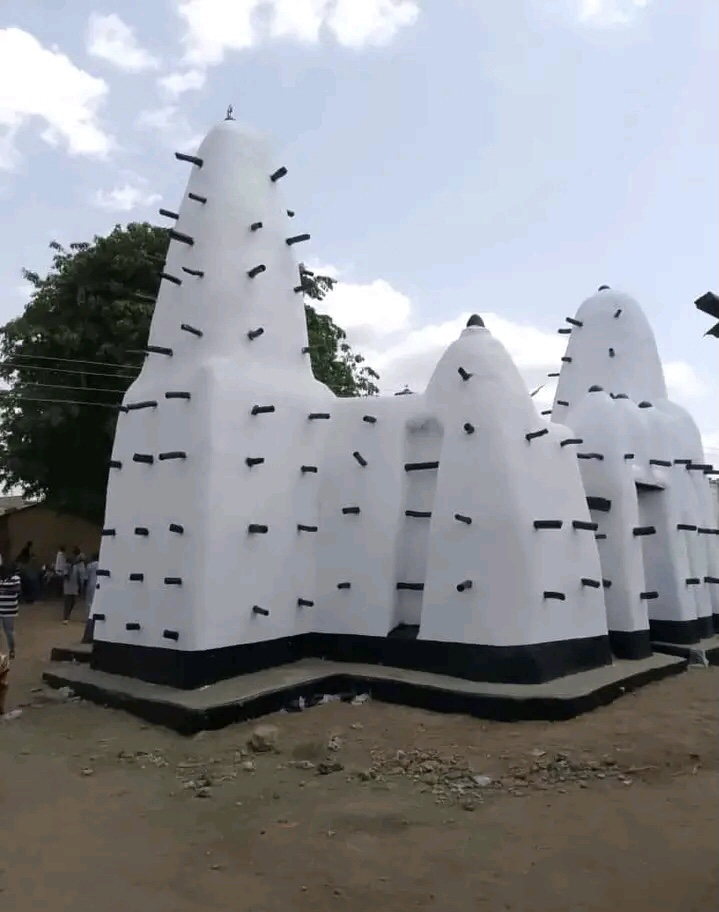

Religion
- Affiliation: Islam
- Ecclesiastical or organizational status: Mosque
- Status: Active

Location
- Location: Upper West
- Country: Ghana
- Interactive map of Wechiau Mosque
- Coordinates: 9°49′50″N 2°41′02″W

Architecture
- Type: Mosque
- Style: Sudano-Sahelian; Djenne

Specifications
- Minarets: 2 (pyramid shape; one extant)
- Materials: Adobe

The Wechiau Mosque is a mosque located in the village of Wechiau in the Upper West region of Ghana.

== Overview ==
The mosque was built in a mix of the Sudano-Sahelian and Djenne architectural styles and has similar features to the Larabanga Mosque. It used to have buttresses similar to Sudanic mosques, but only one tower left. The interior had columns that were small and spaced out to support the flat mud roof.

== See also ==
- Islam in Ghana
- List of mosques in Ghana
