= Nakore Mosque =

Mosque in Upper West Region, Ghana

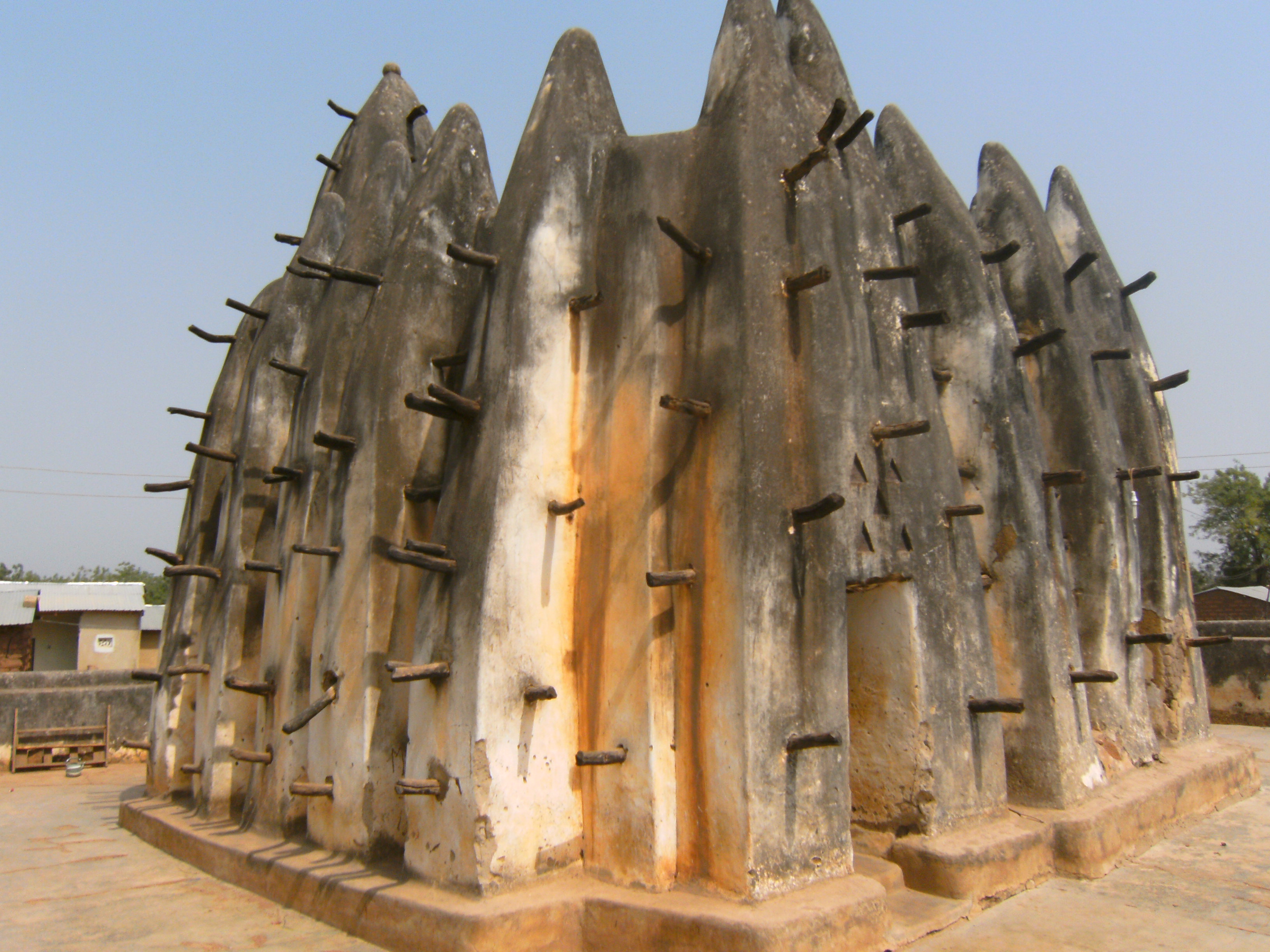

- Location in Ghana

Religion
- Affiliation: Sunni Islam
- Ecclesiastical or organizational status: Mosque
- Status: Active

Location
- Location: Wa Municipal, Upper West
- Country: Ghana
- Interactive map of Nakore Mosque
- Coordinates: 10°3′37″N 2°30′36″W

Architecture
- Type: Mosque
- Style: Sudano-Sahelian
- Completed: c. 17th century

Specifications
- Minaret: 2 (pyramid shape)
- Materials: Adobe

The Nakore Mosque is a small mosque located in the village of Nakore, southwest of Wa, in the Upper West region of Ghana. The mosque was built in the Sudano-Sahelian architectural style.

== Overview ==
According to historians, it was built in the earliest 17th century, when the Mande warriors followed the old Songhai trade routes south into what is currently Ghana. Islam took root as they settled around these north–south routes from Bobo-Diouslasso through Wa to Kumasi.

It is made of timber-frame structures that support the flat roof which is of mud construction. Timbers were reinforced to protrude externally and were used as scaffolding during plastering and construction. It also has a series irregularly shaped buttresses with pinnacles projecting which is above the parapet. It also has two towers that stand taller than the buttresses. One of these towers face east and contains a small prayer room. The entrances have triangular recesses which are above.

== See also ==
- Islam in Ghana
- List of mosques in Ghana
