= Hayatte Ndiaye =

Chadian architect

- Born: Hayatte Abderahim Ndiaye
- Occupation: Architect
- Organization: Hayatt Architecture
- Known for: First female architect of Chad; President of the National Order of Architects of Chad

Hayatte Abderahim Ndiaye is a Chadian architect. She is recognized as the first female architect in Chad and served as president of the Ordre National des Architectes du Tchad (ONAT) from 2019 to 2022. She is also the founder of the architecture firm Hayatt Architecture. She has been involved in promoting sustainable architecture adapted to the climatic and environmental realities of the Sahel.

In 2023, she became the first Chadian architect elected to the council of the Union Internationale des Architectes (UIA).

== Early life and education ==
Ndiaye studied architecture at the Institut supérieur d'architecture Victor Horta in Brussels, Belgium. After completing her studies, she returned to Chad to practice architecture and contribute to the development of the profession in the country.

She later founded the architectural firm Hayatt Architecture, based in N'Djamena.

== Career ==
Ndiaye has worked for more than a decade in architecture and urban planning. Her work has earned international acknowledgment, and she continues to promote Sahelian architecture on global platforms such as then “Habitat Durable au Sahel”.

In April 2018, she initiated the first Sustainable Habitat Day in the Sahel, an event that brought together professionals and stakeholders to discuss environmentally adapted housing solutions.Beyond her architectural practice, she leads the Association of Women Daring to Succeed and Fight for Equity (FORCE), reflecting her commitment to advancing women’s empowerment in her community.

=== President of the National Order of Architects of Chad ===
On 6 July 2019, Ndiaye was elected president of the Ordre National des Architectes du Tchad (ONAT), becoming the first woman to hold the position. She had accumulated more than 13 years of professional experience prior to her election.

During her leadership, the organization worked to strengthen the architectural profession in Chad and to promote collaboration with regional and international institutions. Under her presidency, ONAT celebrated its tenth anniversary in 2022 and hosted meetings with representatives of national architectural orders from several African countries.

=== International activities ===
In July 2023, Ndiaye was elected as a member of the council of the Union Internationale des Architectes (UIA) during the organization's general assembly in Copenhagen, Denmark. Her election marked the first time a Chadian architect had joined the council of the international body.

She has also participated in international discussions and forums on urban development and sustainable architecture in Africa.

== Recognition ==
Ndiaye has been recognized among other African women architects for her contributions to sustainable architecture and the promotion of Sahelian architectural practices. On January 26, 2024, she was appointed as Advisor to the Prime Minister of Chad on Territorial Planning, Housing, and Urban Development.

== See also ==
- African Architecture
- Women in architecture
