= Sunyani Central Mosque =

Mosque in Bono Region, Ghana

- Location within Ghana

Religion
- Affiliation: Islam
- Ecclesiastical or organizational status: Mosque
- Status: Active

Location
- Location: Sunyani, Bono Region
- Country: Ghana
- Interactive map of Sunyani Central Mosque
- Coordinates: 7°20′14.4683″N 2°19′36.9016″W

Architecture
- Type: Mosque

The Sunyani Central Mosque is a mosque located in the Sunyani district in the Bono region of Ghana.

On 18 October 2024, a swarm of bees attacked hundreds of Muslim congregants during their usual Friday prayers.

== See also ==
- Islam in Ghana
- List of mosques in Ghana
