= Madina Mosque (Accra) =

Mosque in La-Nkwantanang-Madina, Ghana

Madina Central Mosque
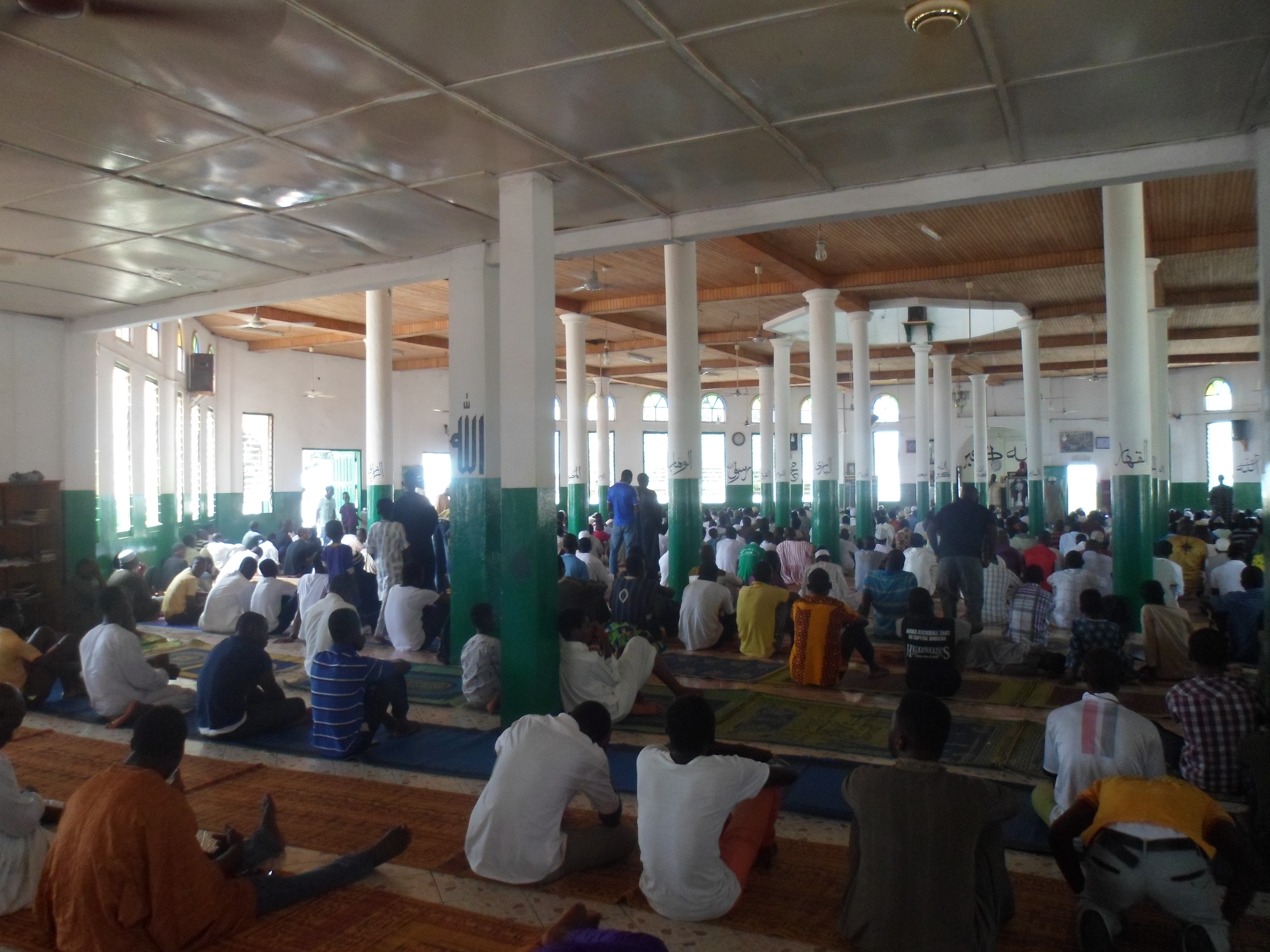
- Mosque interior

- Location within Ghana

Religion
- Affiliation: Islam
- Ecclesiastical or organizational status: Mosque
- Status: Active

Location
- Location: La-Nkwantanang-Madina, Greater Accra Region
- Country: Ghana
- Interactive map of Madina Central Mosque
- Coordinates: 5°40′45″N 0°9′50″W

Architecture
- Type: Mosque
- Completed: 1959

The Madina Central Mosque, also known as the Madina Mosque, is a mosque located in the La Nkwantanang Madina Municipal Assembly in the Greater Accra Region of Ghana. It is the main mosque in the district that congregates worshipers for the Friday Jumu'ah prayers.

Established after 1959, Madina Mosque houses two schools; a basic secondary school offering secular education and a madrasa that specializes in Qur'anic studies. Alms-giving is a common scene in the vicinity of the mosque and researchers have often used the location in their case studies to try to understand the phenomenon of beggary in Ghana.

== See also ==
- Islam in Ghana
- List of mosques in Ghana
