= Banda Nkwanta Mosque =

Mosque in Savannah Region, Ghana

Religion
- Affiliation: Islam
- Ecclesiastical or organisational status: Mosque
- Status: Active

Location
- Location: Banda Nkwanta
- Country: Ghana
- Interactive map of Banda Nkwanta Mosque

Architecture
- Type: Mosque
- Style: Sudano-Sahelian
- Completed: 18th century

Specifications
- Minaret: 2 (pyramid shape)
- Minaret height: 13 m (42 ft)
- Materials: Adobe

The Banda Nkwanta Mosque is a mosque located in Banda Nkwanta in the Savannah region of Ghana.

== Overview ==
The mosque was built in the 18th century by Muslims who migrated south from Sudan. According to historians, the Muslims first entered Africa through Egypt in the 10th century CE and spread throughout the west and south during the gold trade and trans-Saharan slave routes.

It was built with adobe in the Sudano-Sahelian architectural style. The mosque is very tall and it is said to have the tallest minarets among the adobe mosques in Ghana. The eastern tower of the mosque is approximately 13 metres (42 ft) high. It also has higher parapets. It is rectangular in shape with timber-frame structures and pillars which gives support to the roof. It has two pyramidal minarets and a number of buttresses. It has pinnacles which stick out above the parapet.

== See also ==
- Islam in Ghana
- List of mosques in Ghana
