= Kumasi Central Mosque =

Mosque in Kumasi, Ghana

- Location within Ghana

Religion
- Affiliation: Islam
- Ecclesiastical or organizational status: Mosque
- Status: Active

Location
- Location: Kumasi, Ashanti Region
- Country: Ghana
- Interactive map of Kumasi Central Mosque
- Coordinates: 6°40′N 1°37′W

Architecture
- Type: Mosque
- Funded by: Mahamudu Bawumia (2023)
- Established: 1950s (original); 2023 (renovations)

Specifications
- Capacity: 7,000 worshipers
- Dome: 2
- Minaret: 4

The Kumasi Central Mosque is a mosque in Kumasi, the capital city of the Ashanti Region in Ghana. It is the largest mosque in the Ashanti Region and became the second largest in Ghana in 2023 after undergoing a major renovation that was solely financed by the Vice President of Ghana, Mahamudu Bawumia.

== History ==
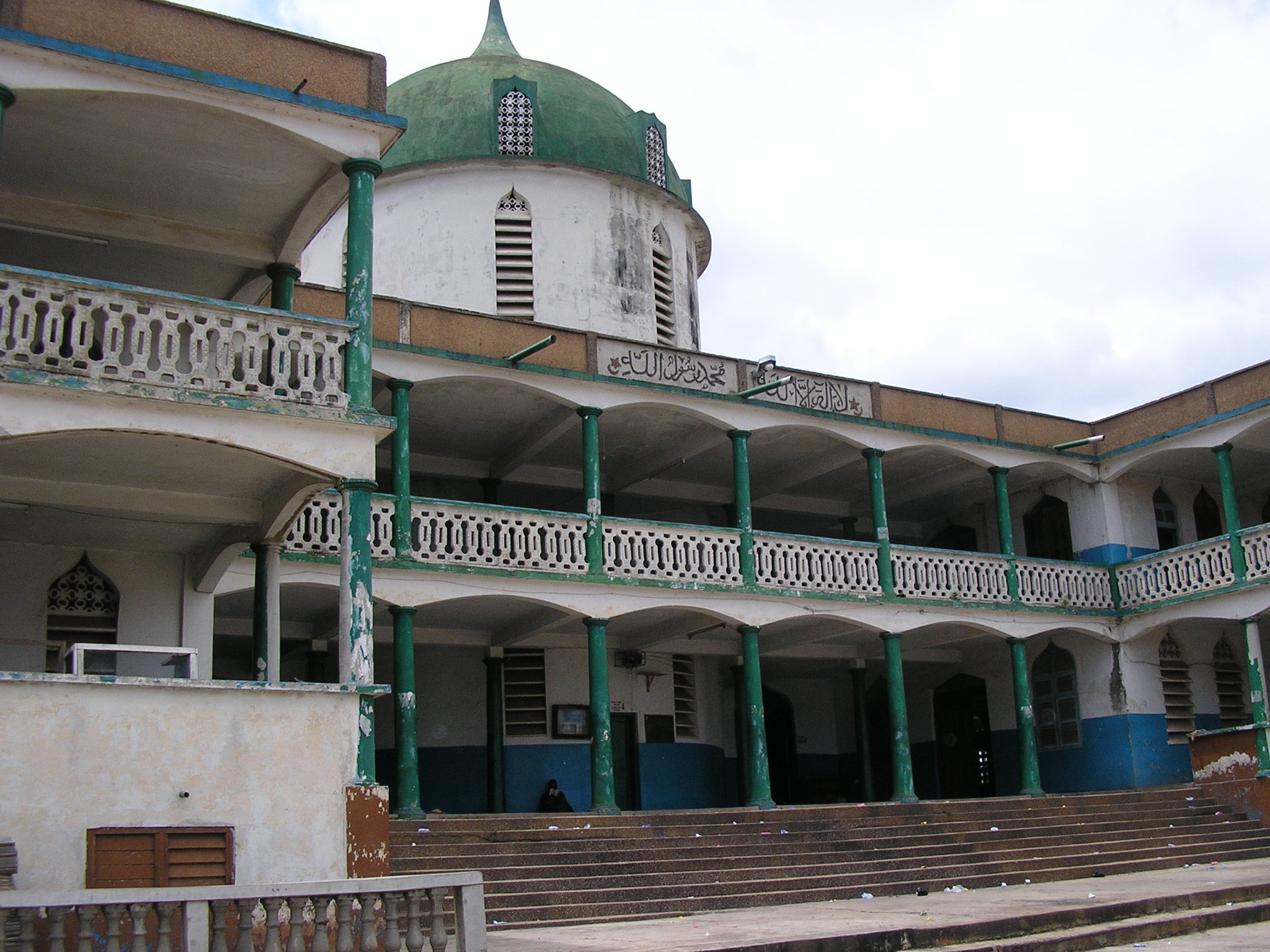
The mosque in 2008, before renovations

The Kumasi Central Mosque was established in the early 1950s to cater to the growing Muslim population in the Ashanti Region. The mosque has undergone several renovations over the years to accommodate the increasing number of worshippers.

In 2020, Vice President Bawumia pledged to renovate the Kumasi Central Mosque after settling 56 years of accumulated lease arrears. The renovation project was aimed at improving the facilities at the mosque and making it more accessible to worshippers. The project was completed in early 2023 and the mosque was officially commissioned by the Vice President on 3 March 2023. The commissioning event was attended by notable figures such as the Asantehene, Otumfuo Nana Osei Tutu II, National Chief Imam, Sheikh Osman Nuhu Sharubutu, government officials, diplomats, regional Imams, Zongo Chiefs, and prominent Christian and Muslim religious leaders. The renovation increased capacity to 7,000 worshipers, a wudu with capacity for 100 worshipers, thirty underground washrooms, 500-seat conference hall, two-bedroom apartments, and eleven furnished offices, in addition to other electrical fittings.

== Architecture ==
The mosque has a unique architectural style that blends traditional Ghanaian and Islamic influences. The mosque is a rectangular building with a flat roof and a central dome and four minarets. The facade of the mosque features intricate geometric patterns and calligraphic inscriptions that are typical of Islamic architecture. The interior of the mosque is decorated with colorful mosaics and calligraphic inscriptions.

== See also ==
- Islam in Ghana
- List of mosques in Ghana
