= Larabanga Mystic Stone =

Mystical stone

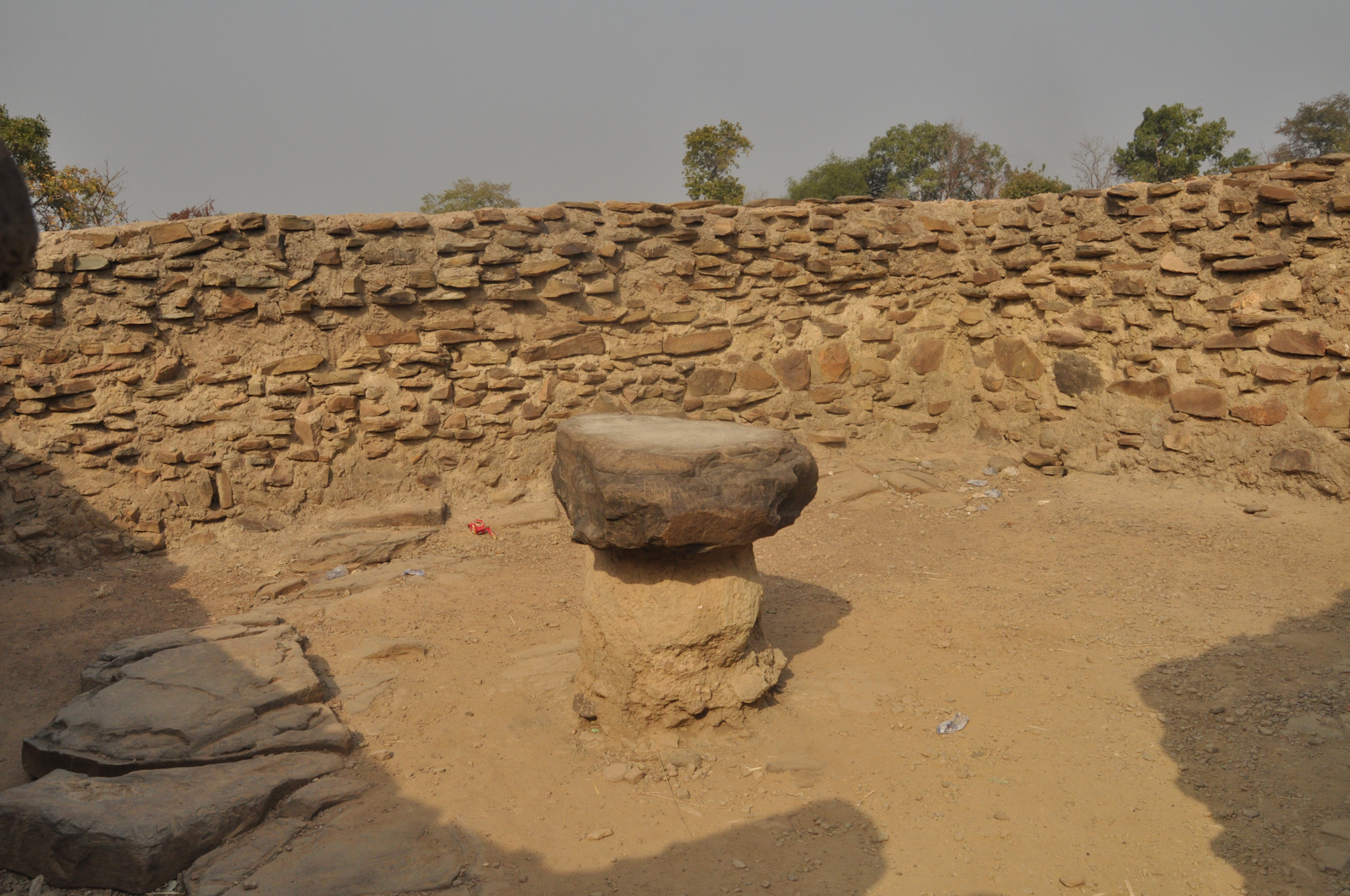
Mystic Stone near Larabanga Mosque Ghana

The Larabanga Mystic Stone is located on the outskirts of Larabanga in the West Gonja District of the Savannah region in Ghana.

The stone is not just an object of interest, it holds immense cultural and spiritual significance for the people of the region, embodying centuries of history, mysticism, and religious symbolism. Located near the famous Larabanga Mosque, one of the oldest mosques in Ghana, the Mystic Stone serves as a reminder of the rich heritage that the village and the nation Ghana hold dear.

== History ==
Larabanga is a community known to be a site of myths and mystical happenings. The stone is known to return to its original place of rest after several attempts of moving it to a different location. In the 1950s, some British road constructors were compelled to redirect a major road after 3 attempts to remove the stone. Since all efforts proved futile in moving it from its original location, the legendary rock was left at its place of rest and it is now conserved as a tourist site by the natives to spread its history and also to generate revenue to the community.

== See also ==
- Larabanga
