= Dondoli Mosque =

Mosque in Upper West Region, Ghana

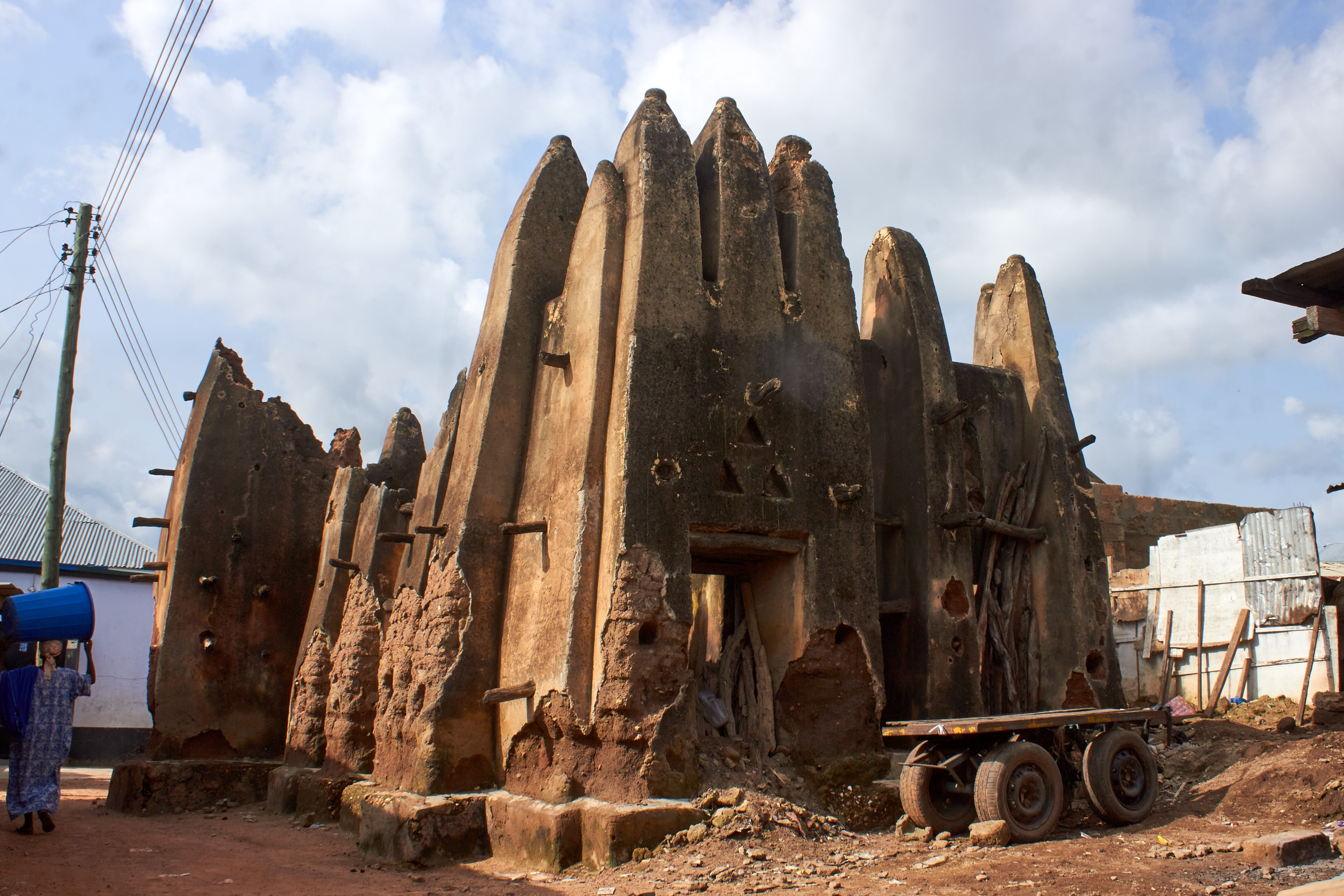
- The mosque in partial ruins

Religion
- Affiliation: Islam
- Ecclesiastical or organizational status: Mosque
- Status: Active (in partial ruins)

Location
- Location: Wa, Upper West
- Country: Ghana
- Interactive map of Dondoli Mosque
- Coordinates: 10°04′07″N 2°29′45″W

Architecture
- Type: Mosque
- Style: Sudano-Sahelian
- Founder: Karimafa
- Established: 19th century

The Dondoli Mosque is a mosque located in the village of Dondoli in Wa in the Upper West region in Ghana. Built in the 19th century in the Sudano-Sahelian architectural style, the mosque is in partial ruins.

== History ==
It was claimed a man called Karimafa who migrated from Mali to Wa built the mosque. The mosque used to be called Karimafa Mosque, after the founder, and was built in the 19th century. Most communities in the Northern part of Ghana are Muslim. In about the 10th century CE, Islam was said to enter Africa. It moved from Egypt to the Western and Southern parts along the gold trade routes.

In Ghana, Islamic traders, Mande warriors and other missionaries used these trade routes. Sometimes these routes were marked by the incursions by the Berber Dynasty. This played a major role for the spread of Islam in that area. Mosques were constructed to serve as resting points for some of these Islamic traders.

Like other mosques in Northern and Savannah Regions of Ghana, Dondoli Mosque is built in the traditional Sudanic-Sahelian architectural style, using local materials and construction techniques.

== See also ==
- Islam in Ghana
- List of mosques in Ghana
