= Bole Mosque =

Mosque in Savannah Region, Ghana

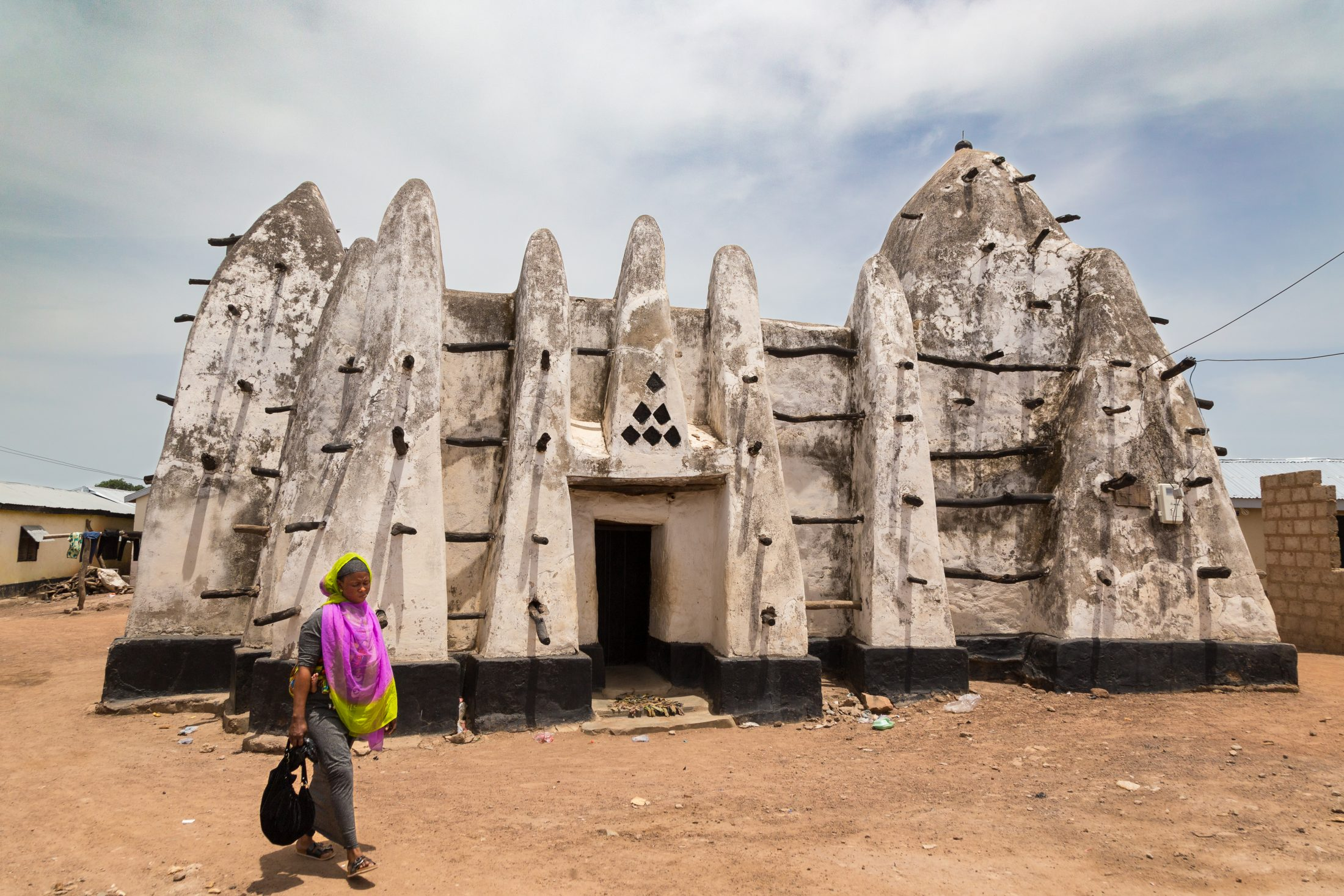
- The mosque in 2020, prior to its 2023 collapse

- Location within Ghana

Religion
- Affiliation: Islam
- Ecclesiastical or organisational status: Mosque
- Status: Active

Location
- Location: Bole, West Gonja District, Savannah
- Country: Ghana
- Interactive map of Bole Mosque
- Coordinates: 9°1′42.43″N 2°29′16.45″W

Architecture
- Type: Mosque
- Style: Sudano-Sahelian
- Completed: c.17th century

Specifications
- Minaret: Several (pyramid shape)
- Materials: Adobe

The Bole Mosque is a mosque located in the center of Bole in the West Gonja District, in the Savannah region of Ghana. The mosque collapsed in 2023; and was restored in the following year.

== History ==
The date of the mosque's construction is unknown, yet is dated from the 17th century; it was perhaps rebuilt in the early 20th century, after the destruction of the town by Samori Toure. It is also claimed in the oral traditions that it was constructed in the 18th century. The state of the Gonjas was claimed to have emerged in the mid 16th century which is in the Savannah region. It extends to the tropical forest to the north in current Ghana. Oral tradition claims its origin goes back to the arrivals of the Mande conquerors who originated from the area of Djenne because of the gold trade and took control of it.

Due to torrential rain in September 2023 the structure, which was already infected with termites, collapsed. It was rebuilt in early 2024, using traditional materials.

== Features ==
It is made of adobe in the Sudano-Sahelian architectural style with sticks and mud. It also has wooden poles found between the buttresses but do not function as structural support to the building. They are used as scaffolding for maintaining the painting and plaster at times. It has short towers.

== See also ==
- Islam in Ghana
- List of mosques in Ghana
