= Chief Imam of Ghana =

Highest Muslim religious authority in Ghana

Chief Imam of Ghana (also referred to as National Chief Imam or Grand Mufti of Ghana, "or simply" Chief Imam) is a de facto title for the highest Muslim religious authority in Ghana.

== Role ==
Not necessarily leader of any Islamic sect, holder of the office represents the Ghanaian Muslim community in national affairs, build bridges between the country's many faiths and "support development programmes that sensitize people to their social responsibilities".

== Succession controversies ==
There have been calls for Government of Ghana to give constitutional backing to the Chief Imam's office; as of January 2016, no major initiative has begun to look into the process.

== List of incumbents ==
- Osman Nuhu Sharubutu 1993—present

== See also ==
- Anbariya Sunni Community
