= Ghana National Mosque =

Mosque in Accra, Ghana

- Location within Ghana

Religion
- Affiliation: Sunni Islam
- Ecclesiastical or organizational status: National mosque
- Status: Active

Location
- Location: Accra
- Country: Ghana
- Interactive map of Ghana National Mosque
- Coordinates: 5°35′26.5″N 0°11′22.5″W

Architecture
- Type: Mosque
- Style: Ottoman Revival
- Funded by: Turkish Hudai Foundation; Turkish Government
- Groundbreaking: 2012
- Completed: 2021
- Construction cost: US$10 million

Specifications
- Capacity: 15,000 worshipers
- Domes: 1 (main); Many (others)
- Minaret: 4
- Minaret height: 65 m (213 ft)
- Site area: 17 ha (42 acres)
- Materials: Carrara marble; stained glass

The Ghana National Mosque is a mosque and Islamic complex in Accra, the capital city of Ghana; and has served as the national mosque for the country since 2021. With capacity for 15,000 worshipers, it is the second largest mosque in West Africa.

Built at a cost of US$10 million, the mosque was funded by the Turkish Hudai Foundation in Accra with the support of the Turkish Government. Located at Kanda (Kawukudi) in Accra, the complex includes a residence for the imam, a madrasa and a library.

== History ==
The construction began in 2012. Osman Nuhu Sharubutu, in a speech at the official opening, claimed Jerry John Rawlings and others helped in the securing of the land for the realization of the project for Muslims in Ghana. In 1995, Rawlings gave out the land to replace a mosque he destroyed for the building of Rawlings Park in Accra. The project was started by the Muslim Community in Ghana and was abandoned close to 10 years because of lack of funds.

The mosque was officially opened on 16 July 2021 by Nana Akufo-Addo. Also present were president Mohammed Bazoum and former president Mahamadou Issoufou of Niger, Mahamudu Bawumia, Fuat Oktay, Ali Erbas, and Osman Nuhu Sharubutu.

== Architecture ==
The mosque is built in an Ottoman Revival style with four signature minarets that are approximately 65 metres (213 ft) high, that can be seen from many parts of Accra. It is claimed to be a replica of the Blue Mosque. It is made of Carrara marble exterior fittings. The upper levels of the interior of the mosque are dominated by blue paints, with stained glass windows with designs. The inner decorations are made of hand-drawn calligraphic verses of the Qur'an. The floors are covered with carpets. The mosque has a mihrab made from sculptured marbles, with a stalactite niche and a double inscriptive panel above it. The exterior feature is arranged with cascade of domes around the main dome.

The mosque has capacity for 15,000 worshipers and is located on a 17-hectare (42-acre) site. It has an office complex for the National Chief Imam, project managers and others; a morgue, a library, a school, dormitories, workers and guests residences; and a fitted clinic with laboratories and a pharmacy.

== Gallery ==
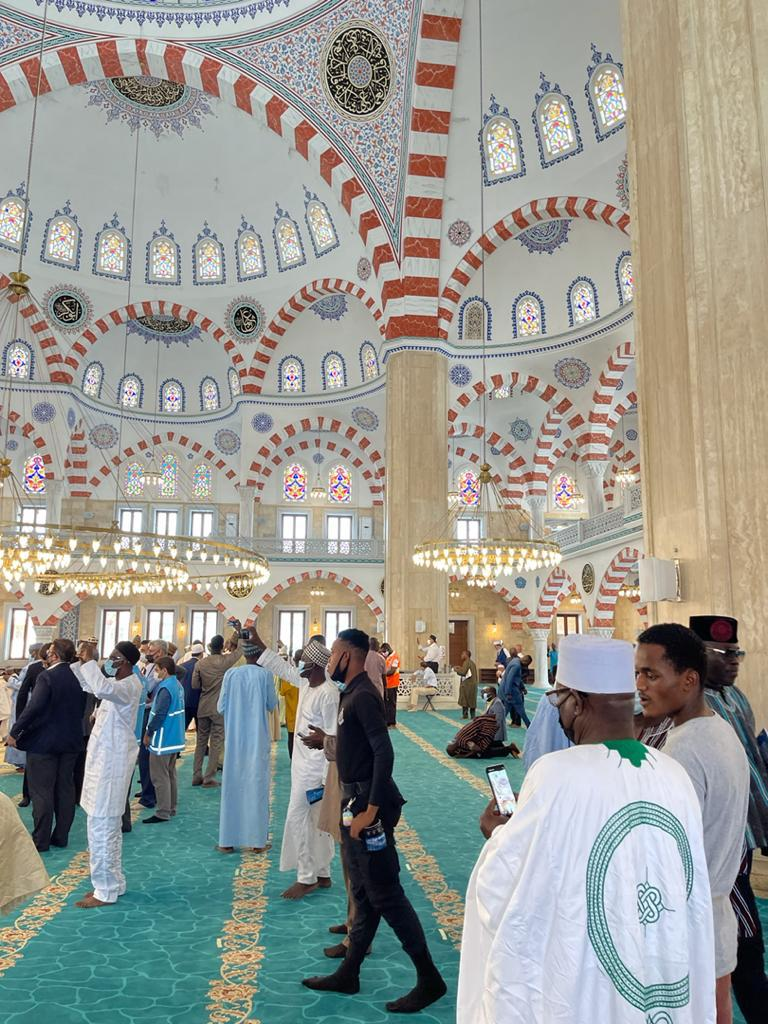
During the commissioning of the mosque

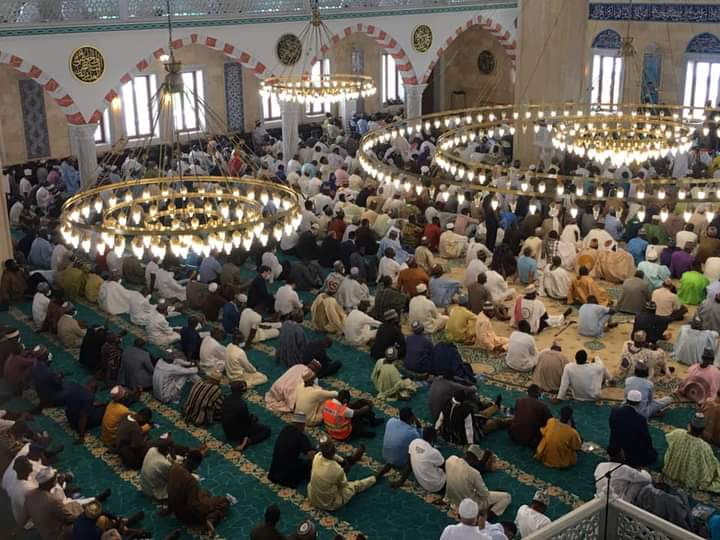
The first Jumuah prayers in the mosque after the commissioning of the mosque

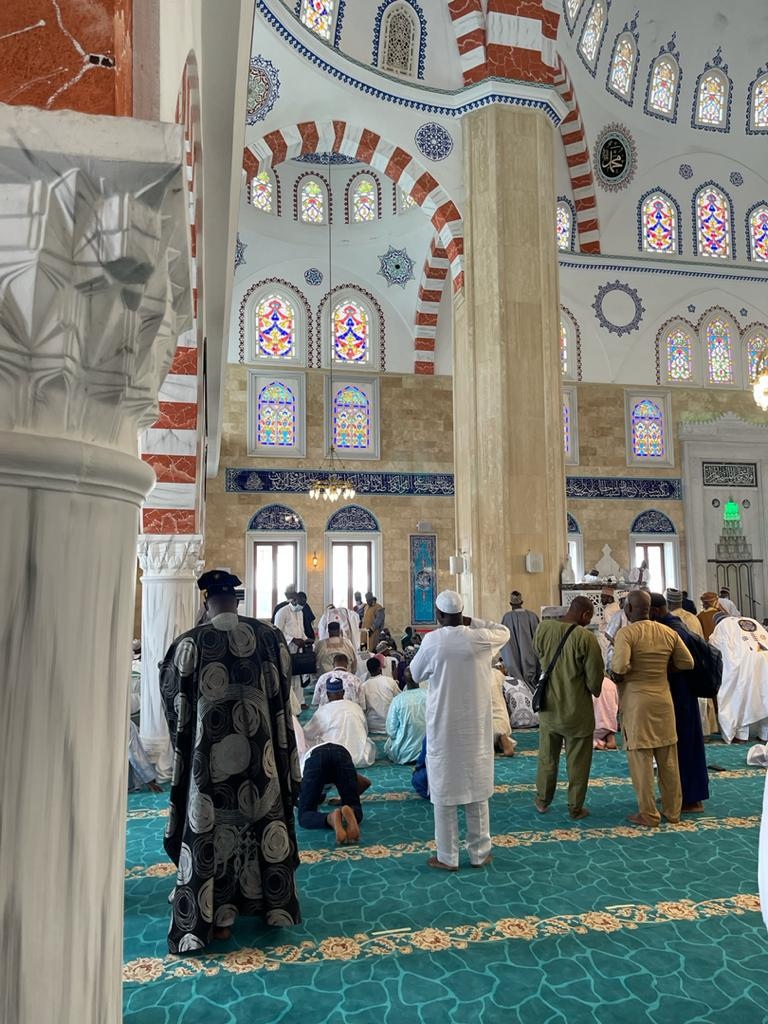
The interior view of the mosque

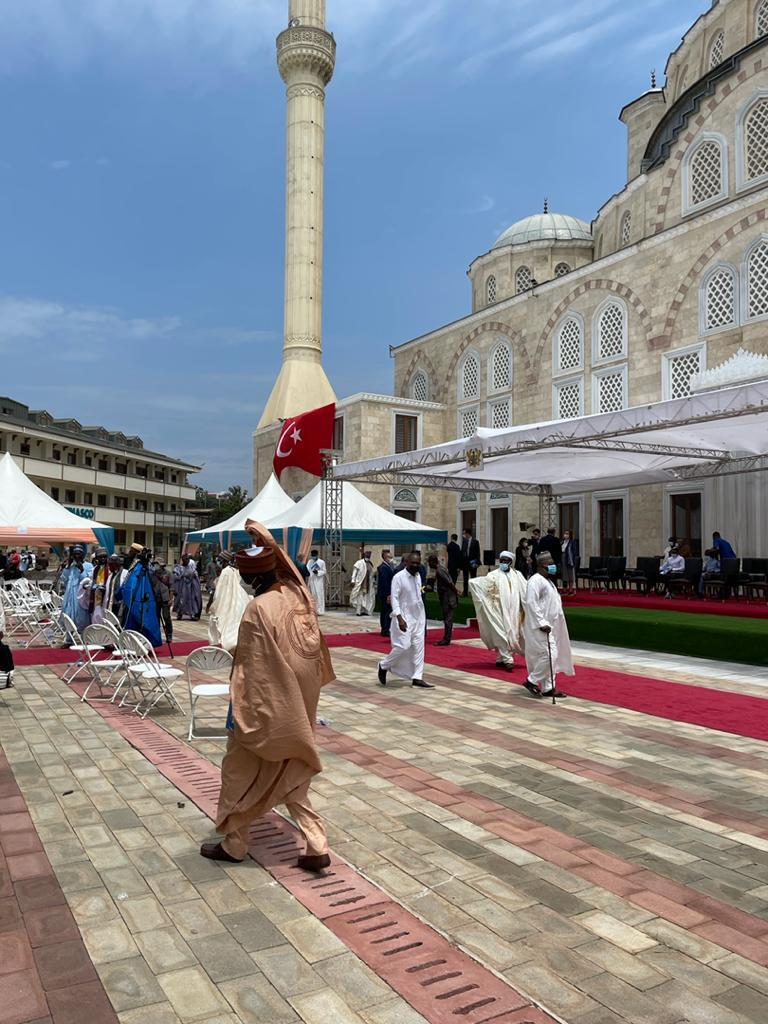
The exterior view of the mosque

== See also ==
- Islam in Ghana
- List of mosques in Ghana
