= Ghana Museums and Monuments Board =

Agency overview
- Formed: 5 March 1957
- Jurisdiction: Ghana
- Website: https://www.gmmb.gov.gh

The Ghana Museums and Monuments Board (GMMB) is the government organisation responsible for the preservation of Ghana's material cultural heritage. It was founded on 5 March 1957, soon after Ghana became independent, by a merger of the National Museum and the Monuments and Relics Commission by Ordinance 20.

== History ==
The origins of the GMMB can be traced back to the establishment of an ethnographic museum at Achimota College (now the Achimota School) in 1929. Following the establishment of the University of Ghana (then known as the University of the Gold Coast) in 1948, the museum was transferred to the university's archaeology department.

In 1952, the British colonial government established an "Interim Council of the National Museum of the Gold Coast". The council later merged with the Monuments and Relics Commission to create the modern GMMB.

== Projects ==
=== Museum of the Nzema Culture and History ===
In 1989 the GMMB signed an agreement with the Italian Ethnological Mission to Ghana (IEMG) which had been reformed under the leadership of Italo Signorini after a period of almost fifteen years of inactivity.
