= Larabanga Mosque =

Mosque in Savannah Region, Ghana

- مسجد لارابانجا
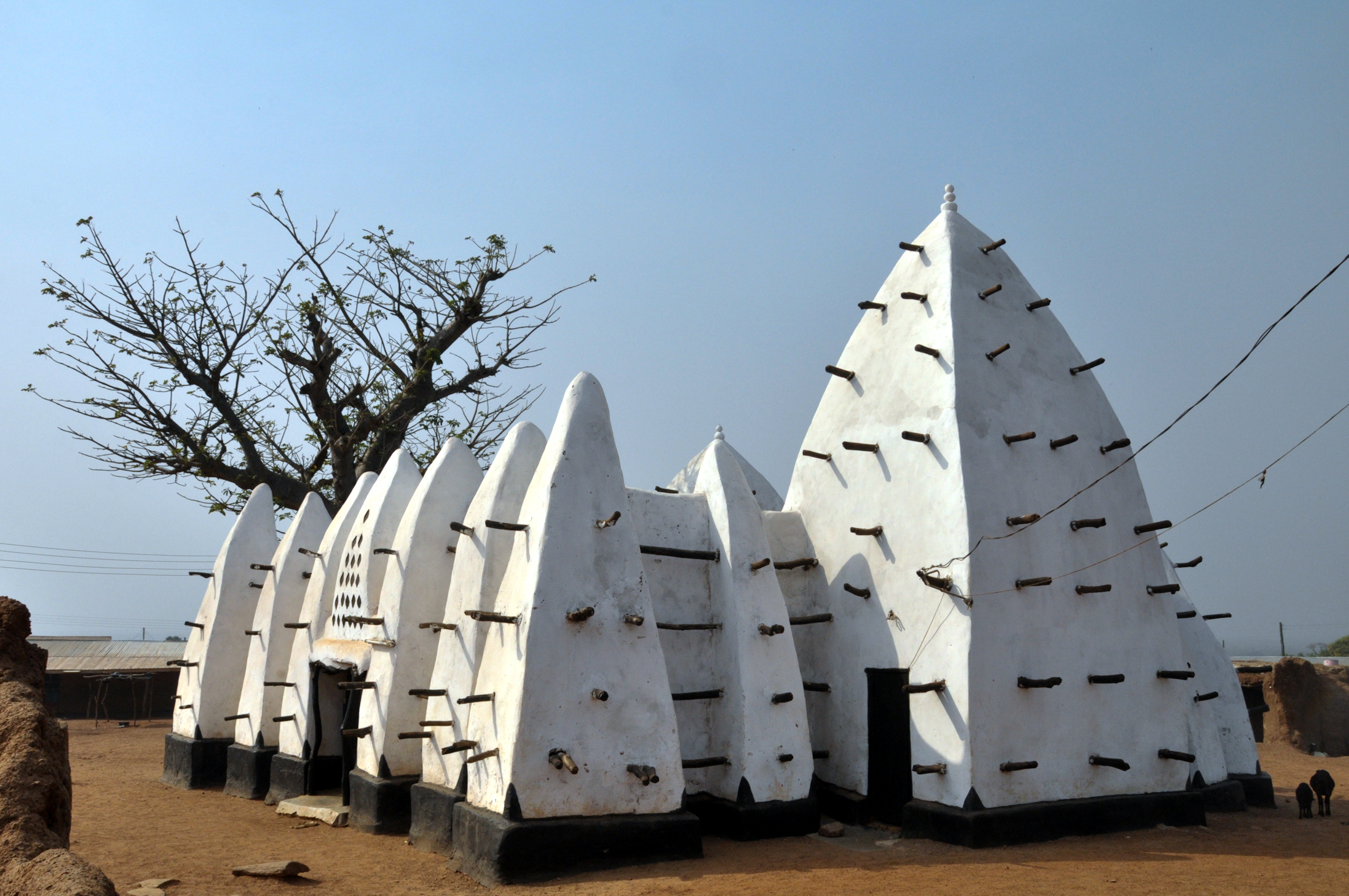

- Location within Ghana

Religion
- Affiliation: Sunni Islam
- Ecclesiastical or organizational status: Mosque
- Status: Active

Location
- Location: Larabanga, West Gonja
- Country: Ghana
- Interactive map of Larabanga Mosque
- Coordinates: 9°13′13″N 1°51′36″W

Architecture
- Architect: Ayuba
- Type: Mosque
- Style: Sudanese architecture
- Completed: 1421 CE

Specifications
- Length: 8 m (26 ft)
- Width: 8 m (26 ft)
- Dome: 1
- Minaret: 2 (pyramid shape)
- Materials: Adobe

The Larabanga Mosque (Arabic: مسجد لارابانجا, romanized: Masjid Lārābānjā) is a mosque built in the Sudanese architectural style in the village of Larabanga, Savanna Region of Ghana. It is the oldest mosque in the country and one of the oldest in West Africa, and has been referred to as the "Mecca of West Africa". The mosque has undergone restoration several times since it was founded in 1421 CE; most recently in 2023. The World Monuments Fund (WMF) has contributed substantially to its restoration and lists it as one of the 100 Most Endangered Sites. The restoration works have revived the knowledge of adobe maintenance.

The mosque has an old Quran, believed by the locals to have been given as a gift from heaven in 1650 to Yidan Barimah Bramah, the Imam at the time, as a result of his prayers. The mosque, built using West African adobe, has two tall towers in pyramidal shape, one for the mihrab which faces towards Mecca forming the facade on the east and the other as a minaret in the northeast corner. These are buttressed by twelve bulbous shaped structures, which are fitted with timber elements.

== Location ==
The mosque is located in the Islamic town of Larabanga, close to Damongo in the West Gonja District of the Savannah Region of Ghana. The town is situated about 15 kilometres (9.3 mi) north of Damongo, and 4 kilometres (2.5 mi) south of the Mole National Park entrance.

== History ==
According to a legend, in 1421 an Islamic trader named Ayuba had a dream while staying here, near a "mystic stone", instructing him to build a mosque. Strangely, when he awoke, he found that the foundations were already in place and he proceeded to construct the mosque until it was completed. There is a belief that he left instructions that he should be buried close to the mosque, when he dies, and after three days, the baobab which would shoot up on his grave was to be preserved for generations. The baobab tree next to the mosque today is reputed to mark the site of Ayuba's grave. The townsfolk of Larabanga supposedly depend on the leaves and stem of this baobab tree for healing of ailments.

Unlike mosques situated in urban settings in West Africa, the Larabanga Mosque is comparatively small. Rural mosques, like Larabanga's, were usually conceived by a single marabout and loosely based on styles seen elsewhere such as in the Great Mosque of Djenné. In order to achieve a physical resemblance to the architecture used elsewhere, the Larabanga Mosque had to incorporate large buttresses in order to compensate for the poorer quality of building materials. Larabanga is one of eight ancient and highly revered mosques in Ghana and is also the oldest. It is a place of pilgrimage and is considered the Mecca of West Africa.

In the 1970s, a mixture of sand and cement was applied to the external faces of the mosque with the intention of protecting the mosque from wind and rain damage. However, this treatment resulted in substantial damage to the building as moisture became trapped in the walls built of adobe and started a deterioration process of the structure, with termites infesting the wooden supports under humid conditions. This resulted in part of the mosque collapsing and during the repair work it caused some distortions of the structural elements and the exterior of the mosque.

Owing to the effect of prevailing winds and rains on the walls, the mosque has needed several renovations and restoration work which over the years have altered some of its exterior designs. In September 2002, a severe storm destroyed the mihrab and the minaret. As a result, the World Monuments Fund (WMF) placed the mosque on the 2002 World Monuments Watch, also considering the damage sustained after the inappropriate restoration in the 1970s. The Ghana Museums and Monuments Board decided to restore the mosque and sought advice from CRAterre, an architectural firm based in Grenoble, France which has expertise in building earthen structures. The renovation work was supported by a WMF, with a grant fund of US$50,000 from American Express. The local community also provided support. The conservation process involved removal of the earlier cement plaster from the surfaces of the mosque, the wooden structural components were replaced, the minaret and the mihrab were reconstructed, the portal was redone, and the interior and exterior surfaces were plastered in the traditional way. The renovation resulted in reassessing the state of conservation of the site, involving a team of local artisans and labourers. It helped to restore the monument with special emphasis on reviving the knowledge of Adobe maintenance.

== Features ==
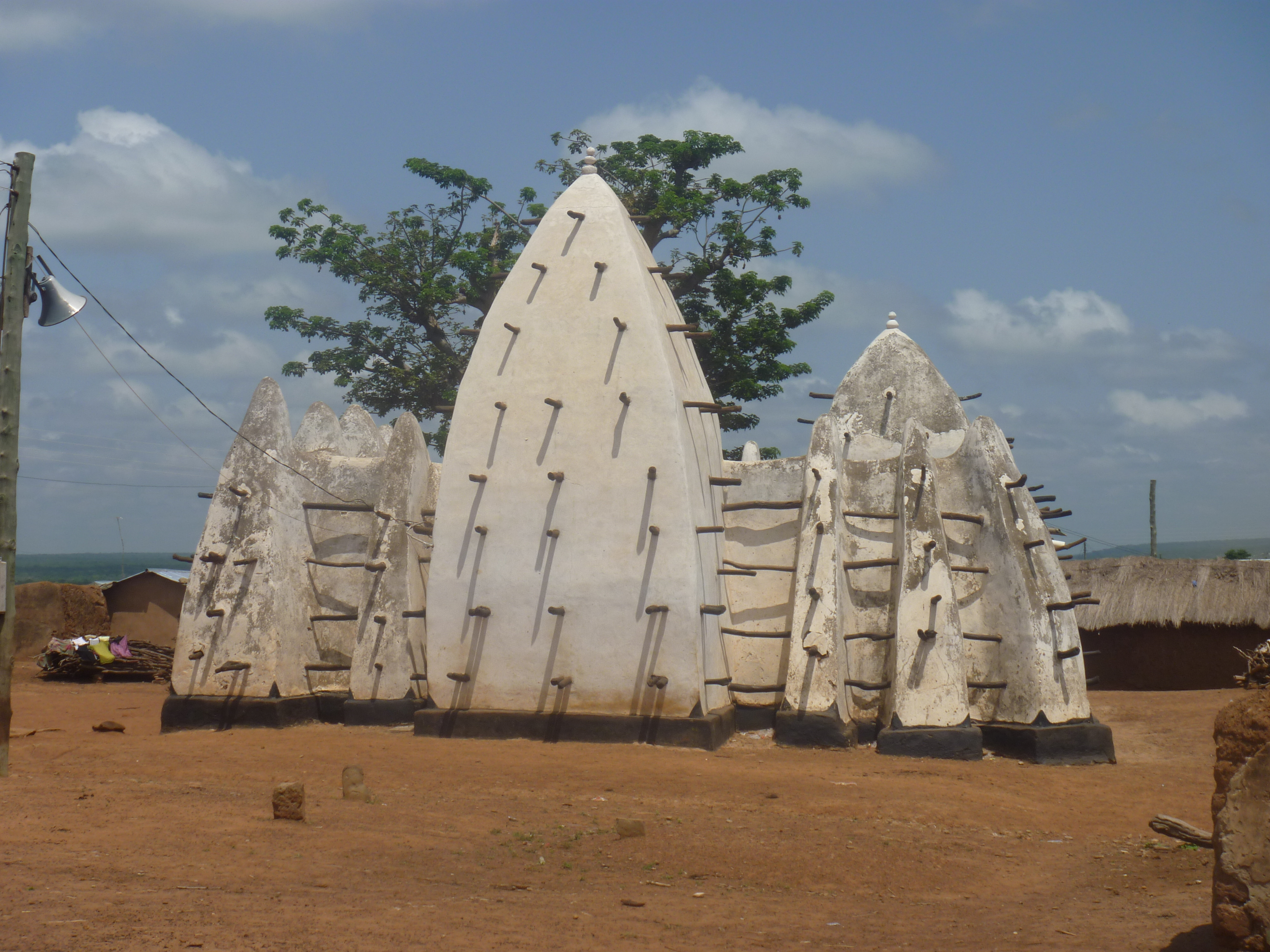
Larabangba Mosque in 2011

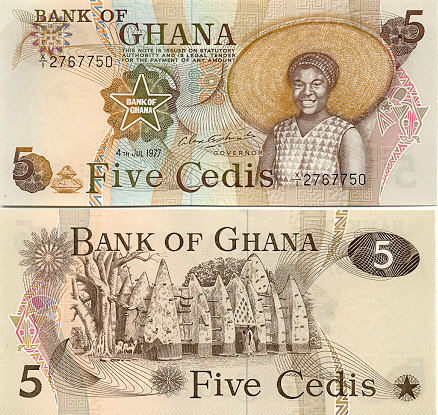
Larabangba Mosque on the reverse of a 1977 5 Cedis banknote

Like other mosques in Northern and Savannah Regions of Ghana, Larabanga Mosque is built in the traditional Sudanic-Sahelian architectural style, using local materials and construction techniques. The mosque is built with wattle and daub, and measures about 8 metres (26 ft) by 8 metres (26 ft). It has two minarets in pyramidal shape, one for the mihrab which faces towards Mecca forming the facade on the east and the other as a minaret in the northeast corner. In addition, 12 buttresses of conical shape on the external walls are strengthened by horizontally-aligned timber elements. The architectural style is also known as "flat-footed adobe architecture". All the structures are given a white wash. The mosque has an old Quran, believed by the locals to have been given as a gift from heaven in 1650 to Bramah, the Imam at the time, as a result of his prayers. The local community has also been supported in a handicraft and tourism project to generate funds not only for meeting the maintenance expenses of the mosque but also improve the economic conditions of the people.

== See also ==
- Islam in Ghana
- List of mosques in Ghana
