= West Gonja Municipal District =

- Municipal District
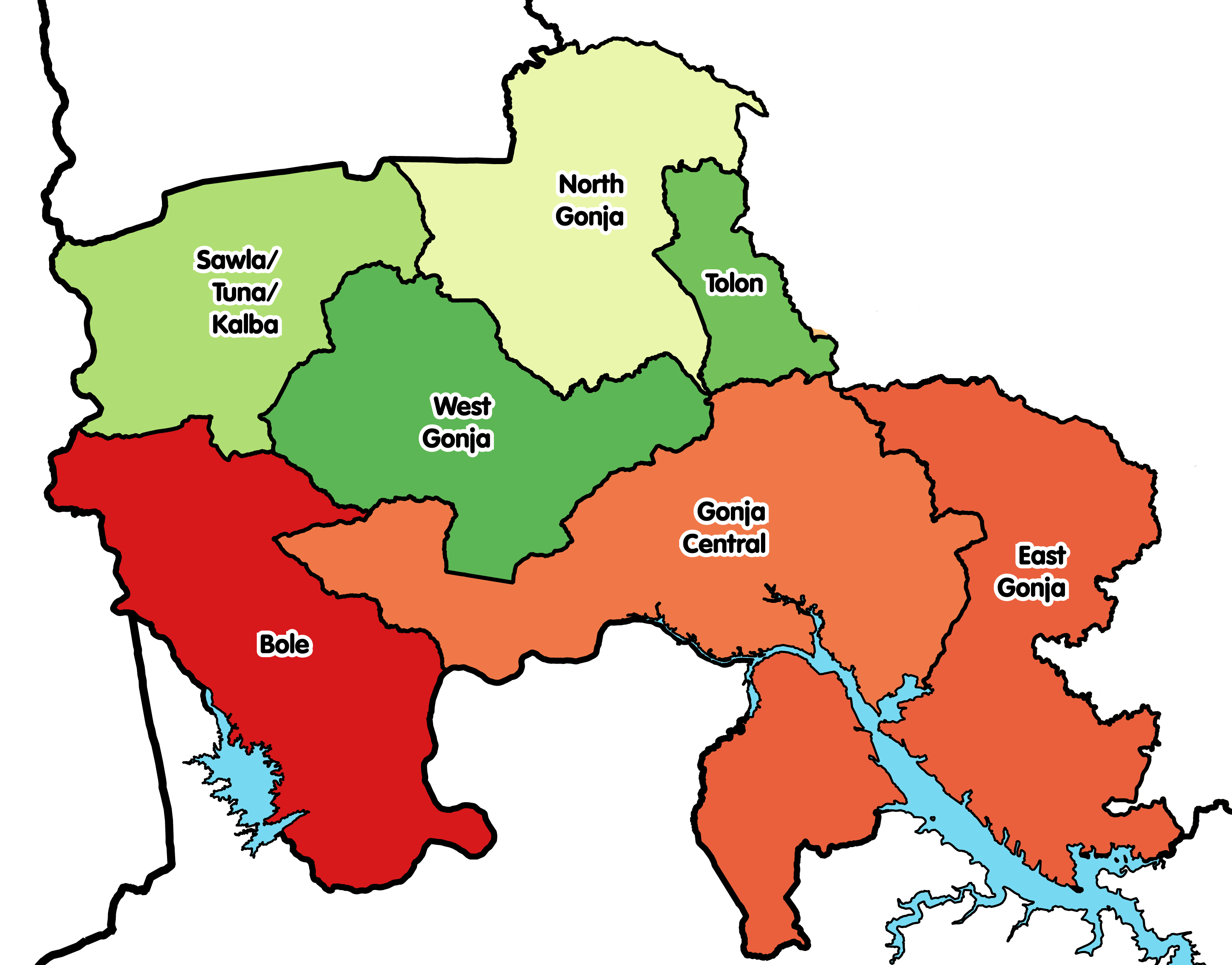
- Districts of Savannah Region

- Location of West Gonja Municipal District within Savannah
- Coordinates: 9°5′2.4″N 1°49′4.8″W
- Country: Ghana
- Region: Savannah
- Capital: Damongo

Government
  - Municipal Chief Executive: Ali Bakari Kassim

Area
  - Total: 17,317 km^{2} (6,686 sq mi)

Population (2021)
  - Total: 63,449
- Time zone: UTC+0 (GMT)
- ISO 3166 code: GH-SV-WG

West Gonja Municipal Assembly is one of the seven districts in Savannah Region, Ghana. Originally created as an ordinary district assembly on 23 December 1988 when it was known as West Gonja District, until the southern part of the district was split off by a decree of president John Agyekum Kufuor in August 2004 to create Central Gonja District; thus the remaining part was retained as West Gonja District. However, on 6 February 2012, the northern part of the district was later split off to create North Gonja District; thus the remaining part has been retained as West Gonja District. Later, it was elevated to municipal district assembly status on 27 January 2020 to become West Gonja Municipal District. The municipality is located in the central part of Savannah Region and has Damongo as its capital town.

== Population ==
Per the 2010 Population and Housing Consensus, the district is estimated to have a population of 41,180, which accounts for 1.7 percent of the region's total population. Among the residents, 80.2 percent are native-born Ghanaian, and 60.5 percent of the employed population work within fishing, agriculture and forestry industries.

== See also ==
- "Districts of Ghana". Statoids.
- GhanaDistricts.com
