= Islam in Ghana =

Ghanaian Muslims
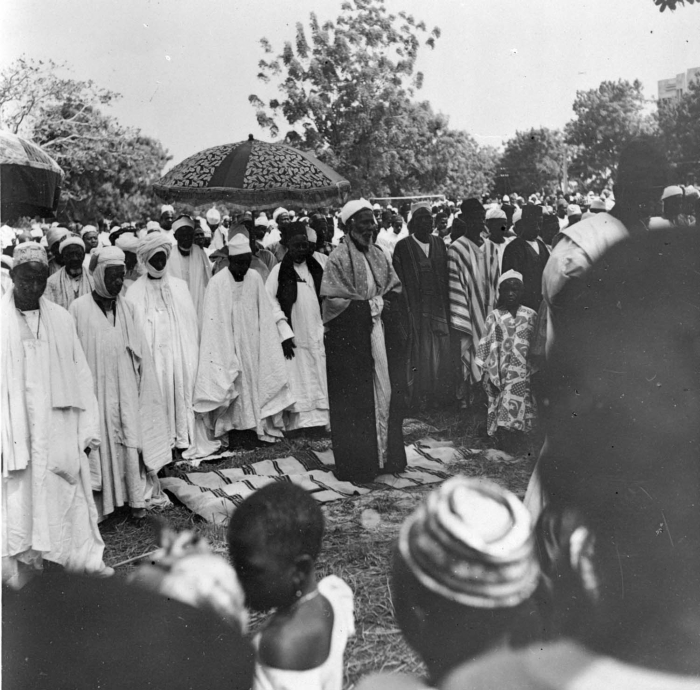

Total population
- 19.9% of Ghana's population in 2021

Regions with significant populations
- Tamale, Kumasi, Accra (0.35 million and above; 2002)

Languages
- English, French, Dagbanli, Hausa, Akan, others

Islam was the first Abrahamic religion to arrive in Ghana. Today, it is the second most widely professed religion in the country behind Christianity. Its presence in Ghana dates back to the 10th century. According to the Ghana Statistical Service's Population and Housing census (2021), the percentage of Muslims in Ghana is about 19.9%.

According to a comprehensive report by the Association of Religion Data Archives, 51% of Muslims are followers of Sunni Islam, while approximately 16% belong to the Ahmadiyya movement. Among Sunni Muslims, the Maliki school of jurisprudence is the most common, though Afa Ajura's reformist activities in the 1960s saw a rise in popularity of the Hanbali school, particularly as informed by the Salafi movement. Sufism, once widespread, has waned considerably over the years; the Tijaniyyah and the Qadiriyyah Sufi orders, however, are still represented among Ghana's traditionalist Muslims.

Muslims and Christians in Ghana have had excellent relations. Guided by the authority of the Muslim Representative Council, religious, social, and economic matters affecting Muslims have often been redressed through negotiations. The National Hajj Council observes the responsibility of arranging pilgrimages to Mecca for believers who can afford the journey. The National Chief Imam of Ghana is the highest authority on Muslim affairs in Ghana.

Some metropolitan areas and cities, especially in areas with a significant Muslim population, have Islamic or Arabic schools offering primary, junior secondary, senior secondary and tertiary education.

== History ==
Islam was introduced by traders from the Sahel regions of West Africa. Prior to that, Da'wah workers had made contact and written extensively about the people including inhabitants of Bonoman states located in the hinterlands of contemporary Ghana. The introduction of Islam into Ghana was mainly the result of the commercial activities of Mande and Hausa speaking traders.

Islam spread through several pathways; the Mande came through the north and north-western corridors of Ghana while the Borno and Hausa traders came from the north-east. Islam is thought to have successfully penetrated southern Ghana following the "collapse of the Bono and the Begho states, and its increase was encouraged by the fact that the slave trade became more lucrative and competitive". Furthermore, the British colonial administration in the nineteenth century enlisted people from various northern predominantly Muslim communities into the colonial army. Finally, the mass exodus of immigrants into forest areas of Ghana following the 1892 Sack of Salaga by joint incursion by Dagomba, Namumba and Gonja tribes depleted Muslim populations in the north while boosting that of the south.

== Demographics ==
Ghana National Mosque, Accra

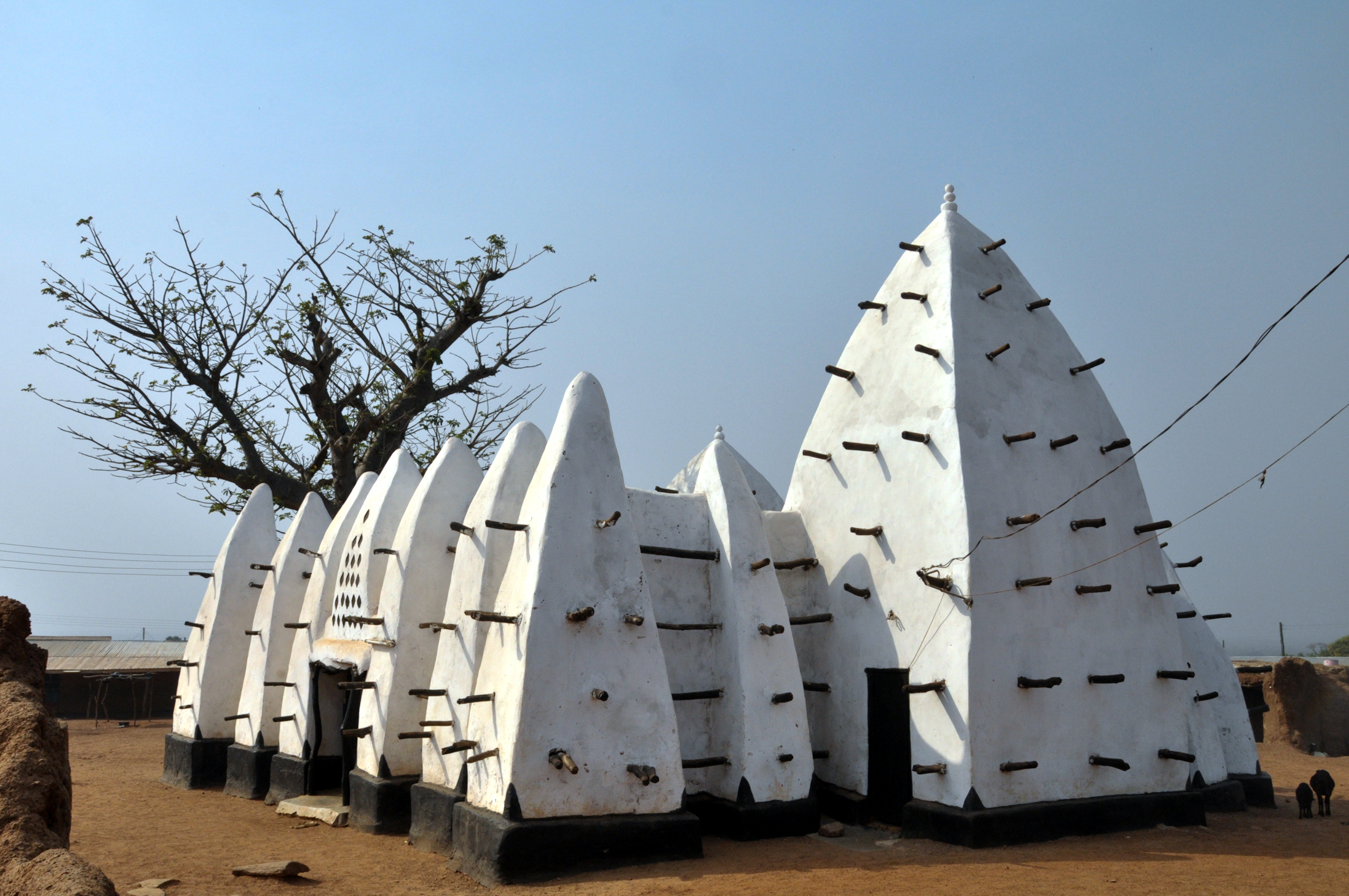
Larabanga Mosque, built in the 15th century.

The Muslim population is concentrated in northern Ghana and in Zongo communities scattered across the country. Zongo communities are settlements predominated by immigrants from Sahelian areas of West Africa (Mandinka, Soninke, Hausa, Songhai, Fulani, etc.) who have adopted the Hausa language as a lingua franca. Members of the Zongo community are mistakenly but commonly regarded as Northerners. However, the two communities are distinct, having different cultures and languages.

The official Ghana Statistical Service census reports approximately 20% as being Muslims although that figure is being protested by independent organizations. The Coalition of Muslim Organizations maintain that the final figures released in 2002 "contained serious flaws and as a result could not be used as reliable data for planning and projecting the country’s development agenda". The call came at the same time groups mainly from the North petitioned the government to withdraw the results, expressing concern that some ethnic groups were underrepresented in the population count and that the service should open up their procedures for public scrutiny. CIA statistics put the population of Muslims in Ghana at 17.6 percent. Other accounts place the figure at 25 percent. (Note: Ghana's Muslims have previously raised concern over the census figures which states that 17% of Ghanaians belong to the Muslim faith. It is claimed that Muslims represent somewhere between 20 and 25% of Ghana. Under this, the Ahmadiyya population would number almost 2 million. The Ahmadiyya Muslim community itself gives an estimate of over 2 million Ahmadis in Ghana. See: "Muslims cry foul over population figures". News From Africa. Retrieved April 30, 2014. (ref 8); Ahmadiyya Muslim Mosques around the World. p. 70 (ref 11)) The government of Ghana's allocation of funds for national development is heavily influenced by population demographics.

=== Geographical distribution ===
According to the 2010 Census, Muslims constitute about 20 percent of the population of Ghana.

Region	Population (2010 census)	Percentage Muslims
Northern	7,479,461	80.0%
Upper East	1,046,545	45.1%
Upper West	702,110	40.1%
Ashanti	4,780,380	20.2%
Brong-Ahafo	2,310,983	17.0%
Greater Accra	4,010,054	15.9%
Western	2,376,021	9.4%
Central	2,201,863	8.7%
Eastern	2,633,154	6.7%
Volta	2,118,252	5.7%
Ghana	24,658,823	20%

Muslims constitute a majority in Northern Region, the biggest religion in Upper East Region and a large minority Upper West Region. There a slightly less Muslims in the southern parts of Ghana.

== Sub groups ==
=== Ahmadiyya ===
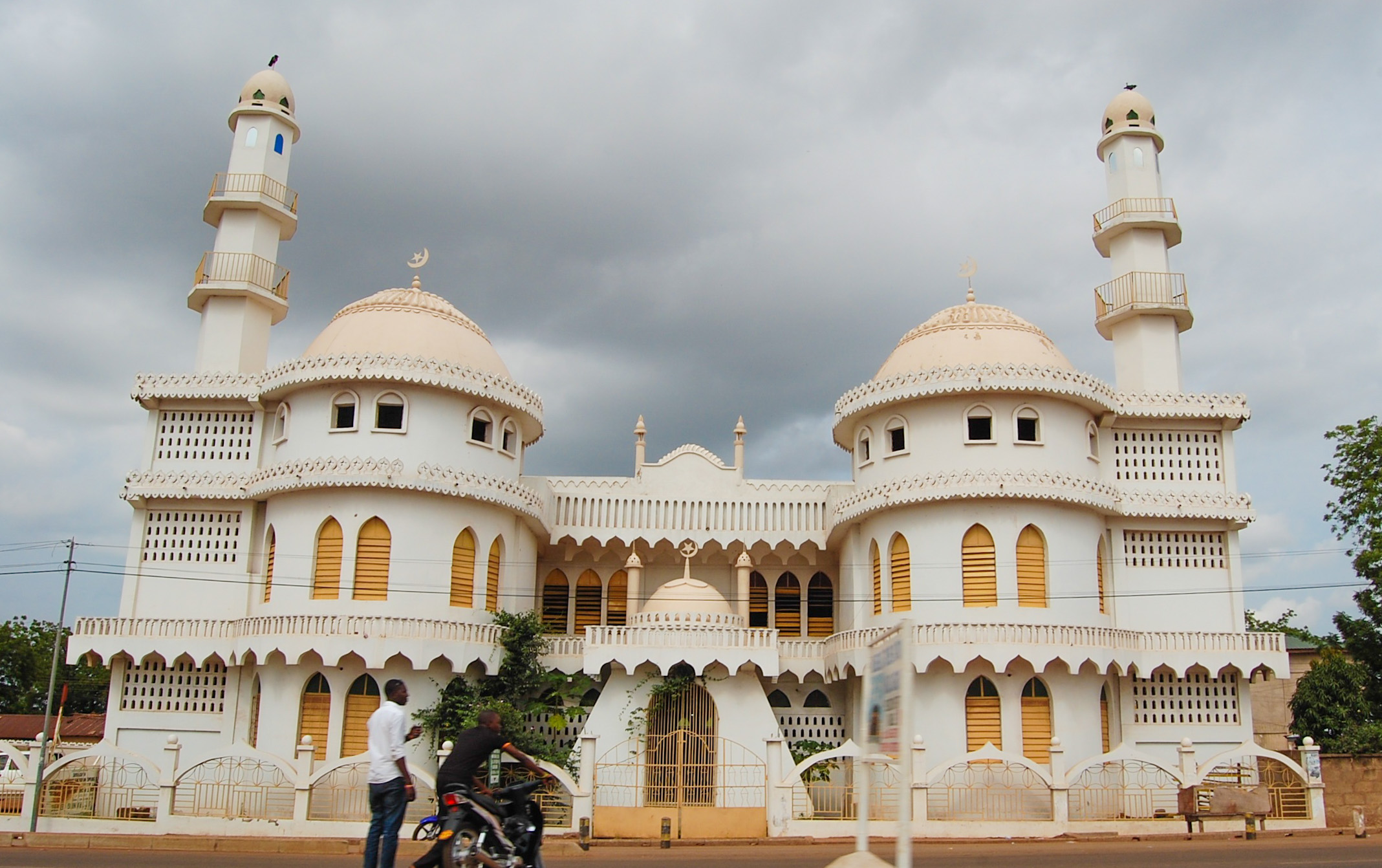
Ahmadiyya Central Mosque in Tamale, Northern region

The Ahmadiyya Muslim Jama'at was formally established in 1921. By 1957, it had attracted about 100,000 converts, mostly from Muslim and Christian backgrounds. The first Ahmadi missionary to Ghana, Maulvi Abdul Rahim Nayyar, came upon invitation from Muslims in Saltpond. According to the Pew "The World's Muslims" survey, 16% of Ghanaian respondents indicated that they identify with the Ahmadiyya movement.

=== Sunni ===
Islam reached the kingdom of Ghana during the ninth and tenth centuries, during a period of trade and competition with the Berbers of North Africa, who had adopted Sunni Islam, according to the Maliki rite of jurisprudence. By the 14th century, Ghanaian kingdoms featured mosques and palaces, as well as Arabic-style Muslim poetry.

Contemporary Sunnism in Ghana includes a majority that follows the Maliki school, which is predominant in West and North Africa, as well as a large contingent that follows the Hanbali school as interpreted by the Salafi movement.

The Sufi orders have a historic presence in Ghana and, as with much of West Africa, the predominant orders are the Tijaniyya and the Qadiriyya. Sufism is common among the immigrant Muslim population of Ghana, also known as the Zongos. About 37 percent of Muslims in Ghana say they belong to a Sufi order.

Salafism was introduced into Ghana as part of the 1940s reformist activities of the late Ghanaian Imam, Afa Ajura. Ajura's campaign challenged the mainstream of Ghanaian Sunnism, which followed the Maliki school of jurisprudence and the Ash'ari school of theology. It was not until the 1970s that his movement gained popularity. From the onset of Ajura's mission, Salafism has been primarily propagated across Ghana in his native Dagbanli language. Recently Salafis in Zongo communities in southern Ghana (18% of Muslims) have formed the "Ahlusunnah wal Jamaa" (ASWaJ) organization in order to reach the Hausa-speaking population. ASWaJ still draws inspiration from their parent Anbariyya leadership, headed by Afa Seidu in Tamale.

=== Shia ===
Shia Islam is also present in Ghana, primarily among the Lebanese immigrant community that arrived starting in the 1980s. Eight per cent of Ghana's Muslim population identify as Shi'i. Shias freely operate religious schools and mosques.

== Notable Muslims ==
- Afa Ajura
- Aliu Mahama
- Sheikh Osman Nuhu Shaributu
- Mahamudu Bawumia
- Samira Bawumia
- Abedi Pele
- Farouk Aliu Mahama
- Mustapha Abdul-Hamid
- Native Officer Ali
- Sulley Muntari
- Abdul Salam Mumuni
- Mubarak Wakaso
- André Ayew
- Jordan Ayew
- Baba Rahman
- Kasim Nuhu
- Mubarak Mohammed Muntaka
- Haruna Iddrisu
- Mohammed Kudus
- Ahmed Ramadan
- Thomas Partey

== See also ==
- Office of Chief Imam of Ghana
- Religion in Ghana
