= Gonja =

Gonja may refer to:

- The Gonja kingdom
- The Gonja people who live there
- Gonja language
- Ranjan Ramanayake

== See also ==
- Central Gonja District
- East Gonja Municipal District
- North East Gonja District
- North Gonja (district)
- West Gonja Municipal District
