= Chumburung =

Traditional area in Ghana

Chumburung is a kingdom and traditional area in the western part of Kpandae District in the Northern Region of Ghana. It is the homeland of the Chumburu, but Bassari, Gonjas, Kokombas and Nawuri(s) are also indigenous in the area. Land, however, can only be acquired with the permission of the village chief and the king, who are both natives and officials of the Chumburung kingdom. Chumburung is also the name of the language of the Chumburu.

The kingdom of Chumburung encompasses a number of villages at both sides of the Dakar River, from Kojobonipe in the North to Lonto in the South-West and Wiae in the East, both on the shores of Lake Volta. Other towns and villages in the kingdom, roughly from North to South, are Ekumdepe (Kumdi for short), Ba(n)kamba, Chakori, Nanjiro, Tori, Jamboae and Kachanka.

Chumburung is remote from the modern world in many senses. The few roads that exist in the area can only be plied by heavy vehicles, such as lorries, Benz buses in good condition, strong pick-ups and 4WD vehicles. Since few inhabitants can afford such means of transport for private use, the most popular vehicle is the motorcycle. Public transport consists of one Benz daily between Kpandae and Salaga (leaving Kpandae at dawn, arriving in Salaga around 10 a.m., and returning in the afternoon) and one Benz bus daily between Banda and Salaga, serving almost all the villages of Chumburung (leaving Banda at dawn and also returning in the afternoon).

Up to now (April, 2014), Chumburung is not connected to any electricity network and few inhabitants have their own generators, but Volta River Authority is in the process of connecting some of the towns to its grid. The only telephone company that is active in the area is MTN, but inhabitants of Wiae may get coverage from the Airtel Africa pole in Banda.

The first schools in Chumburung were set up by Ashanti teachers in the 1980s; they were later followed by others who started to teach in the local languages including Chumburung.
