= Salaga Slave Market =

18th-century Ghanaian slave market

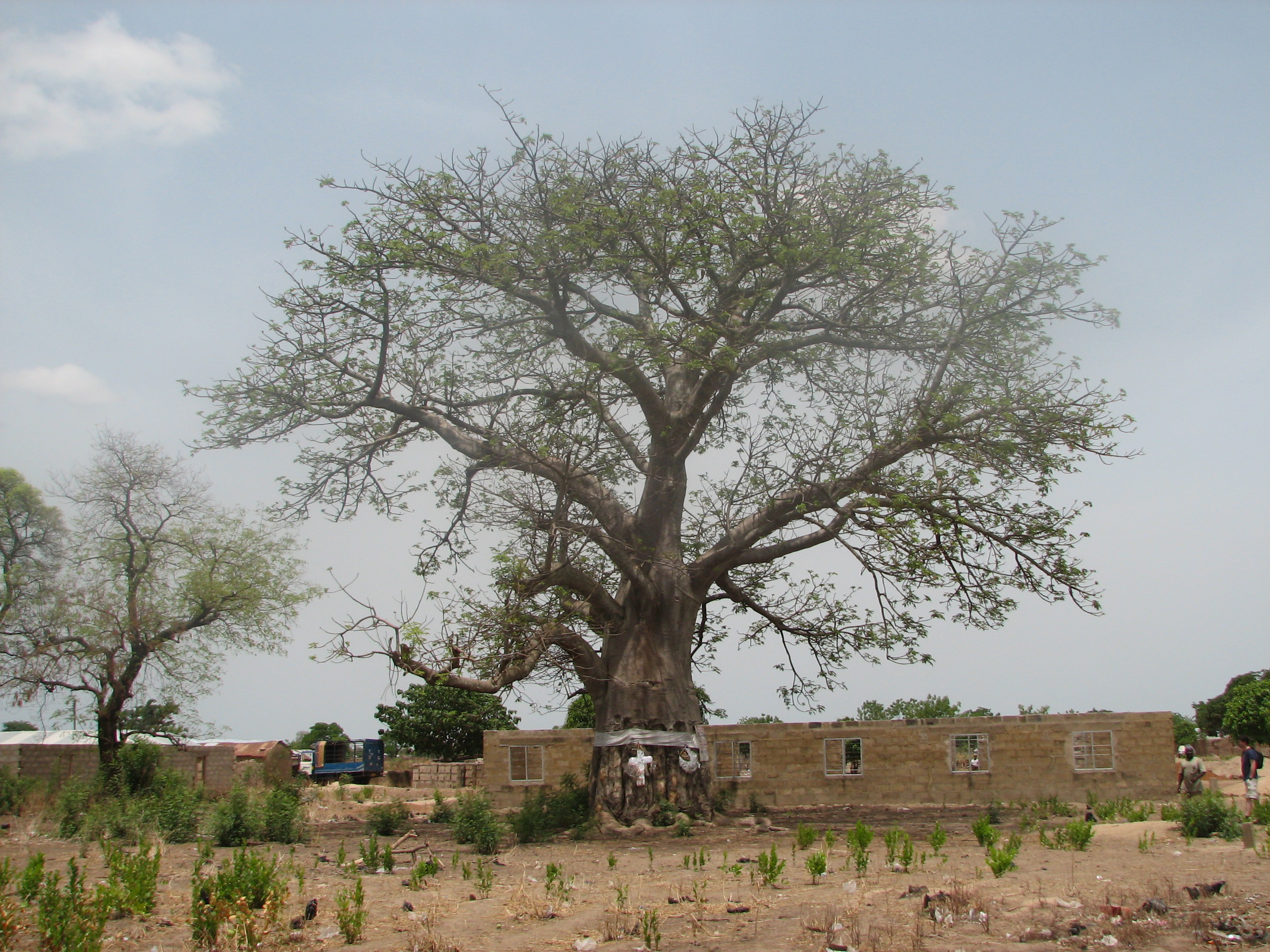
Welcome sign. The white calico cloth indicates its spiritual significance.

Salaga Slave Market is an 18th-century slave market located in the East Gonja District of the Savannah Region of Ghana. During the Trans-Atlantic slave trade, Salaga served as an important market where slaves were transported to the coast for export. The market also served as outposts for the movement of slaves along the trans-Saharan routes.

== History ==
From the 16th century, Salaga was one of the leading market centers in West Africa. Salaga was founded by the Mande leader Dyakpa Nde wura in 16th century Gonja kingdom before being overrun by Asante forces in 1744. During the Third Anglo-Ashanti War in 1874, the British defeat of the Asante ended the Asante rule over Salaga. However, this coupled with the British abolition of slavery in the Gold Coast in 1874-1875 did not end the practices in the Gold Coast. There were frequent caravans of slaves from Salaga to Kintampo slave market, then to southern or coastal areas, however it was abolished in 1896. Kete-Krachi took over, then slave caravans, some of which were ordered by the slave raider Babatu came there directly from Bole, Wa, Bonotuku and Upper Volta.

The defeat of the Asante also had subsequent effects on the slave trade in later years, as there was a shift from Salaga as the main slave market to other markets. While this did not diminish the importance of Salaga as a source of slaves, it emphasized the expansion of the slave trade in the Gold Coast.

Kola, beads, ostrich feathers, animal hides, textiles and gold were among the goods traded in the market. However, in the 18th century, the market became a key center in the trading of humans. People from the Upper West, Upper East and Northern Regions served as sources for slaves. Slaves from the market were mostly exchanged for Kola nuts, cowries and gold.

At the market, there were various stands for slaves, cattle, sheep, and merchandise. Slaves would be inspected and bargained for a price. A variety of people benefited from slavery at the market as it became a commercial venture. For example, local chiefs benefited through the sale of slaves. Although there was a sentiment that the practice was inhumane, it became a common feature of life in Salaga.

== Features of Salaga ==
Slaves were kept in a warehouse with a mud roof during rainy days. In modern times, the roof is protected by an aluminium roof to protect from unexpected weather changes. Wells located around the market are, according to oral tradition, associated with slave labour although the water management system pre-dated the slave trade. There is also a stream that is often associated with the well said to have been the bathing place of slaves, known as wanka bayu. Additionally, there were was a slave cemetery known as rafia angulu.

== Salaga today ==
In modern times, the Salaga Slave market was abandoned by the East Gonja District Assembly and the Ghana Tourism Authority. It had been reduced to a parking space or used mainly for business activities. However, recently through initiatives such as the 2024 Emancipation Day celebration, the Ghana Tourism Authority has decided to refurbish the slave market and the slave wells. This was a restorative effort to transform the past of the market into a "beacon of remembrance and healing."

The effort is to transform the market and the wells into a top class cultural and tourist destination. Doing so would serve as a learning experience to build a more inclusive and equitable society. As stated by the Minister of Tourism, Arts, and Culture, the refurbishment of the Salage Slave market and Wells seeks to "drum home the sacrifices made by ancestors during their enslavement and their unwavering struggle for freedom."

== See also ==
- Salaga
