= Zuwera Ibrahimah =

Ghanaian politician

Hon. Zuwera Ibrahimah
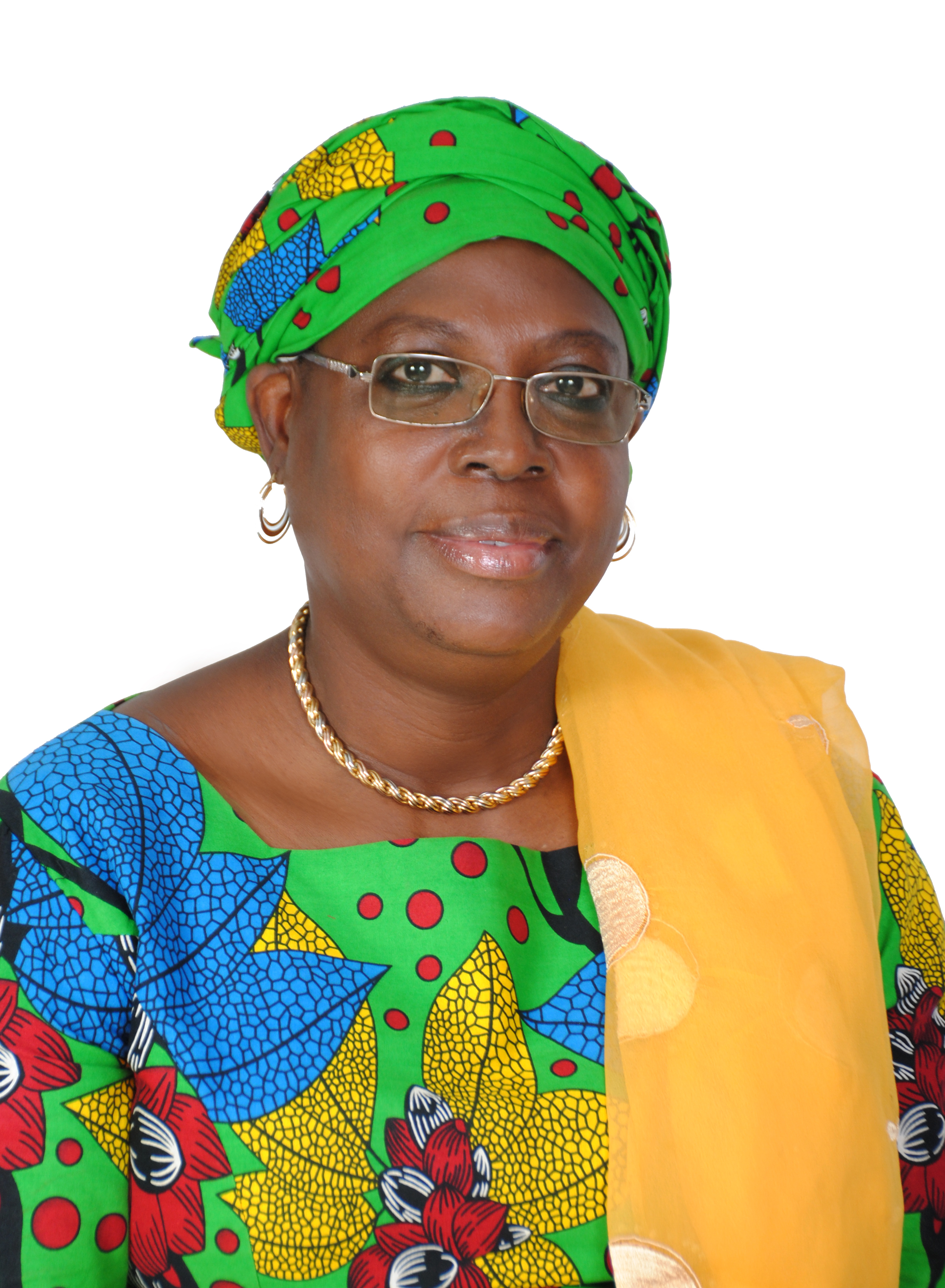

Member of Parliament for Salaga South Constituency
- Incumbent
- Assumed office 7 January 2021
- Preceded by: Salifu Adam Braimah

Personal details
- Party: National Democratic Congress
- Education: University of Cape Coast; Trent University; University of Ghana; University of Ghana Business School; University of East Anglia

Zuwera Mohammed Ibrahimah (born 27 July 1970) is a Ghanaian politician. She is a member of the National Democratic Congress (NDC). She is the Member of Parliament for the Salaga South Constituency in the Savannah Region of Ghana. She was the first woman in the Salaga area to be elected as a member of parliament in the fourth republic.

== Early life and education ==
Zuwera Mohammed was born on 27 July 1970 to late Kuntundawura, Alhaji Mohammed Zublilah Ibrahimah of Kpembe, who was a former principal and rector of Tamale Polytechnic, now Tamale Technical University and Adisah Nassamu Ibrahimah.

She hails from Kpembe in the Savanna region of Ghana. She spent her childhood in Winneba where she started basic education. She had her secondary education at the Tamale Senior High School and later in Nigeria where her father was then serving as lecturer at the Adu Bayero University in Kano, Nigeria. She holds a Bachelor of Arts degree in Management Studies from the University of Cape Coast from 1998 and a post Graduate Diploma in Community Development, from Trent University in Canada. She also holds a Master of Arts (MA) degree in Communication Studies from the school of communication studies, University of Ghana from 2006 as well as completing an Executive Master of Business Administration (EMBA) in Marketing from the University of Ghana Business School in 2007.

She obtained her master's degree in Diplomacy and International Trade Business (Diplomacy) from the University of East Anglia in the UK in 2012. She is currently on her thesis project in pursuit of a PhD in Media and Communication from the Goldsmiths College, University of London in the United Kingdom.

== Career ==
Zuwera has worked in different sectors especially in community development planning, administration and diplomacy. Prior to entering politics, she was the deputy director of the Information Services Department.

She worked as a project officer in the three Northern Regions (Upper East Region, Upper West Region and Northern Region) on the Small Town Water Supply Systems project and also as a project officer with the Catholic Relief Services on the Quality Improvements in Primary school programme in the Northern Regions as well.

Zuwera worked as a consultant on the Joint Monitoring Programme for Water Supply Sanitation and Hygiene (JMP) by WHO/UNICEF in Ghana. She also worked respectively as the country Manager of the Association of Chartered Certified Accountant (ACCA) and the country Representative of the Discovery Channel Global Education Partnership.

In the field of diplomacy, she worked as the Minister-Counsellor and Head of Information and Public Relations of the Ghana High Commission, London.

== Politics ==
=== Parliamentary bid ===
In August 2019, she contested for the National Democratic Congress primaries for Salaga South Constituency and won as the candidate to represent the party in the December 2020 Elections.

Zuwera Ibrahimah garnered 472 votes to win the election against Ibrahim Dey Abubakari, a former two-term member of parliament for the constituency, Ahmed Saaka Shaibu Dan and Lukman Jawula who had 260, 116 and 1 votes respectively.

Ibrahimah won the 2020 parliamentary elections for Salaga South Constituency to make history as the first female member of parliament for Savannah Region. She won after polling 20,525 votes representing 49.5% against the incumbent member of parliament Salifu Adam Braimah of the New Patriotic Party who also doubled as the Savannah Regional Minister, who had 19,086 votes representing 45.90%.

=== Member of Parliament ===
Ibrahimah was sworn in as Member of Parliament representing the Salaga South Constituency in the 8th Parliament of the 4th Republic of Ghana on 7 January 2021. As of 7 January 2021, she is one of the 40 women and the only one from the Savannah Region who are representing their respective constituencies in the 8th Parliament. She serves as a member on the Foreign Affairs Committee and the Appointments Committee of Parliament.
