= Kpembe =

Town in Ghana

Coordinates: 8°31′55″N 0°29′45″W

Kpembe is a town located in the East Gonja Municipal in the Savannah Region of Ghana. The town is just 2 km from Salaga, the administrative capital of the district. The town serves as the traditional capital for the Kpembe Traditional Area. The former GFA President Alhaji M.N.D Jawula was a Lepowura under the traditional council. The entire population of the town is into farming. The chief of Kpembe serves as the overlord of the Salaga town.

== Education ==
Kpembe Nursing and Midwifery Training College is the college located in Kpembe.
