= Old Buipe =

- District Capital
- Location of Old Buipe in Savannah Region Old Buipe (Africa)
- Coordinates: 08°48′34″N 01°33′35″W
- Country: Ghana
- Region: Savannah Region
- District: Central Gonja District

Population (2013)
  - Total: —
- Time zone: GMT
  - Summer (DST): GMT

Old Buipe is a small town and archaeological site in the Central Gonja District, in the Savannah Region of northern Ghana.

Buipe was an important regional center and market for kola nuts in the 15th century, before Sumaila Ndewura Jakpa founded the Gonja kingdom. According to oral tradition, Buipe was the site of the first mosque in the kingdom, and the residence of the first imams, as well as the Jakpa's burial place. It was an early rival to Yagbum for pre-eminence within Gonja.

Most of the population of Old Buipe abandoned the site in the 1950s for nearby New Buipe.
