= Salaga North (Ghana parliament constituency) =

Parliamentary constituency in Ghana

- constituency for the Parliament of Ghana
- District: North East Gonja District
- Region: Savannah Region of Ghana

Current constituency
- Party: National Democratic Congress
- MP: Alhassan Mumuni

Salaga North is one of the constituencies represented in the Parliament of Ghana. It elects one member of parliament (MP) by the first-past-the-post system of election. Alhassan Mumuni is the member of parliament for the constituency. The Salaga North constituency is located in the East Gonja district of the Savannah Region of Ghana.

== Boundaries ==
The seat is located entirely within the East Gonja District of the Savannah region of Ghana.

== Members of Parliament ==
Election	Member	Party
2008	Ibrahim Dey Abubakari	National Democratic Congress
2012	Ibrahim Dey Abubakari	National Democratic Congress
2016	Alhassan Mumuni	National Democratic Congress
2020	Alhassan Abdallah Iddi	New Patriotic Party
2024	Alhassan Mumuni	National Democratic Congress

== Elections ==
Alhassan Mumuni is the current MP for the Salaga North constituency.

== See also ==
- List of Ghana Parliament Constituencies
- East Gonja District
