= Bikunuto Jewu Soale I =

Ruler of Gonja

Jira Bikunuto Jewu Soale I (born May 16, 1954) is the 34th Yagbonwura of the Gonja kingdom. He succeeded the late Sulemana Tumtunba Boresa I. He was enskinned on Monday, 20 March 2023 at Nyange, the ancient capital of Gonja. Incumbent Vice-President of Ghana Mahamudu Bawumia and former President of Ghana John Mahama attended the enskinment. He is from the Tuluwe gate.

== Early life and education ==
He was born in Chama, a small town in the Tuluwe Traditional paramountcy of Gonja in the Central Gonja District of the Savannah Region.
