= Mempeasem =

Community in Savannah Region, Ghana

- Country: Ghana
- Region: Savannah Region
- District: North Gonja District

Mempeasem is a community in the North Gonja District in the Savannah Region of Ghana.

== See also ==
- Gonja-Mamprusi conflict
- Lukula, Ghana
