= Lukula, Ghana =

Community in the Savannah Region, Ghana

Lukula
- Location in Ghana
- Country: Ghana
- Region: Savannah Region
- District: North Gonja District

Lukula is a farming community in the North Gonja District in the Savannah Region of Ghana.

== See also ==
- Gonja-Mamprusi conflict
- Mempeasem
