= Alhassan Mumuni =

Ghanaian politician (born 1967)

Member of the Ghana Parliament for Salaga North Constituency

Personal details
- Born: 23 September 1967 (age 59) Gbung, Ghana
- Party: National Democratic Congress
- Education: University of Education, Winneba

Alhassan Mumuni (born 23 September 1967) is a Ghanaian politician and member of the Seventh Parliament of the Fourth Republic of Ghana representing the Salaga North Constituency in the Northern Region on the ticket of the National Democratic Congress.

== Early life ==
Mumuni was born on 23 September 1967 at Gbung in the northern region of Ghana.

== Education ==
Mumuni attended the University of Education, Winneba, and graduated with a Bachelor of Education degree.

== Personal life ==
Mumuni is a Muslim, and is married with six children.

== Politics ==
Mumuni is a member of the National Democratic Congress (NDC). In 2012, he contested the Salaga North seat on the ticket of the NDC sixth parliament of the fourth republic and won.

=== 2012 election ===
Mumuni contested the 2012 Ghanaian general election on the ticket of the National Democratic Congress for the Salaga North parliamentary seat in the Northern Region of Ghana and won the election with 6,772 votes which is equivalent to 62.39% of the total votes. He won the election over Adam Mohammed Kamarudeen of the New Patriotic Party who polled 3,462 votes representing 31.89%, and IND parliamentary candidate Abdul-Fataw Abdul-Wahab who had 621 votes representing 5.72% of the total votes.

==== 2016 election ====
Mumuni was re-elected in the 2016 Ghanaian general election as a member of parliament for Salaga North constituency on the ticket of National Democratic Congress. He won the election with 6,363 votes representing 52.22% of the total votes. He won the parliamentary seat over Lucas Alhassan Abilla of the New Patriotic Party who polled 3,037 votes which is equivalent to 24.92%, Abdul-Fataw Abdul-Wahab of PPP who had 2,733 votes representing 22.43% and the parliamentary candidate for convention people's party polled 52 votes representing 0.43% of the total votes.

===== 2020 election =====
Mumuni again contested the 2020 Ghanaian general election for the Salaga North constituency on the ticket of the National Democratic Congress but lost the election to Alhassan Abdallah Iddi of the New Patriotic Party.

== Employment ==
- Ghana Education Service (Circuit Supervisor, Rural North "B" Circuit Salaga)
- DCE (East Gonja District) April, 2009–January, 2013
