= Sonyor Deng Festival =

Festival in Ghana by the Sonyor people in Bole District

Sonyor Deng Festival is an annual festival celebrated by the chiefs and people of Sonyor in the Bole District in the Savannah Region, formally Northern region of Ghana. It is usually celebrated in the month of May.

== Celebrations ==
During the festival, live bush animals are presented to the shrine.

== Significance ==
It is celebrated by the Gonja worshippers of the Sonyor 'Kupo' shrine to pay homage to the shrine.
