= Gonja-Mamprusi conflict =

Conflict between the Gonjas and Mamprusis

Date	August 2019 -
Location	Savannah Region, Ghana

Belligerents
Gonja people	Mamprusi people

Casualties and losses
- 10+ deaths, 34 houses burned

The Gonja-Mamprusi conflict is a conflict between the members of the Gonjas and the Mamprusis at Lukula in the North Gonja district in the Savannah Region, Ghana. The conflict first began in 2019 when the government of Ghana intended to create the Savannah Region and North East Region out of the Northern Region.

== Background ==
The conflict started in 2019 after the Wasipe Traditional Council of the Gonja Kingdom decided to enskin a chief to overlook the Lukula community. The Jang Traditional Area also claimed ownership of the community. This led to disputes between the two Traditional Areas.

=== The conflict ===
In August 2019, 34 houses were burned and 2 people were killed in the clashes between the tribes.

On 23 May 2021, in the villages of Kijasa and Lansupe one person died and other 3 injured in the clashes.

In April 2023, at least 2 person were burnt in the clashes between the tribes in Mempeasem.

Between May and June 2023, 7 people died, one of them a Mamprusi leader, and other injured in the clashes.
