= Salaga South (Ghana parliament constituency) =

Constituency in Ghana

- constituency for the Parliament of Ghana
- District: East Gonja District
- Region: Savannah Region of Ghana

Current constituency
- Party: New Patriotic Party
- MP: Zuwera Mohammed Ibrahimah

Salaga South is one of the constituencies represented in the Parliament of Ghana. It elects one member of parliament (MP) by the first past the post system of election. The Salaga South constituency is located in the East Gonja district of the Savannah Region of Ghana.

== Boundaries ==
The seat is located entirely within the East Gonja District of the Savannah region of Ghana.

== Members of Parliament ==
Election	Member	Party
2008	Ibrahim Dey Abubakari	National Democratic Congress
2012	Ibrahim Dey Abubakari	National Democratic Congress
2016	Salifu Adam Braimah	New Patriotic Party
2021	Zuwera Mohammed Ibrahimah	National Democratic Congress
2025	Zuwera Mohammed Ibrahimah	National Democratic Congress

== Elections ==
Zuwela Mohammed Ibrahimah is the current MP for the Salaga South constituency.

== See also ==
- List of parliamentary constituencies of Ghana
- East Gonja District
