= Joseph Adam Braimah =

Ghanaian politician, author and chief (1916–1987)

Member of the Ghana Parliament for Gonja East Constituency

Personal details
- Born: 31 August 1916 Kpembe, Savannah Region
- Died: 1986 (aged 69–70)
- Party: Northern People's Party, Convention Peoples Party
- Children: 52
- Occupation: Author, Chief

Joseph Adam Braimah (also known as Kabuchewura Joseph Adam Braimah, 1916–1987) was a Ghanaian politician, author and chief. In 1951, he was the first person from the Northern Region to be appointed as a Minister in Ghana and also a Member of Parliament. He was the first Ghanaian minister to resign from his position after confessing of taking bribe from Aksor Kasardjian, an Armenian contractor.

== Early life and education ==
Braimah was born on 31 August 1916 and hails from Kpembe in the Savannah Region (formerly Northern Region) of Ghana.

== Career ==
He was a Minister for Communications and Work during Nkrumah's regime. He was the National Vice Chairman of the United Party in 1957.

== Politics ==
In 1950, Braimah was appointed member of the Legislative Council and in 1951, Kwame Nkrumah appointed him as a Cabinet Minister. He was a founding member of the Northern People's Party which was a political party founded by politicians of the Northern Territories of the Gold Goast to contest the general election in 1954. In 1959, he became a member of the Convention Peoples Party. He was the Member of Parliament for Gonja East in the then Northern Region (now Savannah Region) of Ghana.

== Personal life ==
Braimah had 11 wives and 52 children. He is the father of Salifu Adam Braimah. Atchulo Samuel William Braimah is the father of Joseph Adam Braimah.

== Death ==
Braimah died in the 1980s at the age of 70.

== Legacy ==
In May 2021, Mahamudu Bawumia launched Braimah's memoir “JA Braimah: Biography of a Trailblazer,” because of his contributions to the development of Ghana and Ghana's politics at the Ghana Academy of Arts and Sciences.

== Controversy ==
In 1959, Braimah together with Mumuni Bawumia moved from the United Party to the Convention Peoples Party because of disagreements to boycott National Assembly proceedings. They were accused of betrayal and abandoning the Northern People's Party and the United Party for their self goals and interests.
