= Salaga Senior High School =

Public high school in Salaga, Ghana

Coordinates: 8.538°N 0.510°W

Salaga Senior High School, also known by its acronym SASS is a second-cycle co-education institution located in Salaga, the district capital of Central Gonja Municipal in the Savannah Region of Ghana. It is a grade C school with the motto "Truth Stands". It was established in September 1976 and has an enrolment of 1800 students which are mixed day students and boarders.

In 2018 the school was the focus of an incident in which a student shot at and injured one of the students.

== Bibliography ==
- Bonsu, Nana Osei (1 January 2020). "An Examination of Senior High Schools Teacher-Student Conflicts in Ghana". All Nations University Journal of Applied Thought.
- Nketia, Richmond; Shaibu, Uzairu; Tonwisi Luri, Prosper (28 December 2022). "Levels of Perceived Need for Mental Health Care among High School Students with Depression: A Study in the East Gonja Municipality, Ghana". International Journal of Multidisciplinary Studies and Innovative Research. 10 (3): 1602–1610. doi:10.53075/Ijmsirq/3564573464. S2CID 255255327.
