= Alhaji M. N. D. Jawula =

Ghanaian civil servant (1949–2023)

Alhaji M.N.D Jawula (2 May 1949 – 21 January 2023) was a Ghanaian statesman, civil servant, chief, and football administrator. He served as the president for Ghana Football Association from 1997 to 2000. He was chief of the Kujolobito Gate of Lepo-Kpembe of Salaga in the Savannah Region.

== Early life ==
Alhaji was born at Cow Lane in Accra to Kpembiwura Jawula Ababio, a former Convention People's Party (CPP) party chairman, and to Hajia Suweibatu Shardow. He was the only child of his mother. As royal, the childhood of Jawula was a memorable one. Unlike other boys of his age, young Jawula was exempted from performing house chores. But instead most of his time was used at his father's palace, where he listen to elders and learn the traditions of his peoples.

== Education ==
Jawula started his education at an early age at Kpandai, the town his father was a chief of. From Kpandai, he continued his education at Tamale Secondary School. With his love for sports, he became an integral member of the school's sport team. He was both a 100 metres athletic and a table tennis player. Young Jawula started his political career at this level and became the Senior Prefect of the school.

After the sixth form, he gained admission into University of Cape Coast to read English and Economics in 1968. He had his Master's in African Literature at University of Ghana, Legon. In both universities, he taught by some famous personalities, notable among them was Efua Sutherland and Ama Atta Aidoo.

== Career ==
=== As a civil servant ===
After his education, he returned to his Alma Mater, Tamale Secondary School and taught as a teacher from 1972 to 1974 where he later became the Head of the Economic Department of the school. Alhaji Jawula later served as Assistant Secretary at the East Dagomba district council in Yendi between 1976 and 1978. In 1989, he traveled to Canada as a fellow at the University of Carlton, Ottawa. Jawula had also worked in a number of ministries; he joined the Ministry of Finance from 2000 to 2003 as a Deputy Director of Administration.

After his service, he was moved to serve as the Chief Director for Ministry of Harbours and Railways from 2003 to 2006. Due to his managerial and administrative experience, he was appointed the Chief Director of Ministry of Health. He served in this capacity from 2006 to 2008, all under the presidency of His excellency John Agyekum Kuffuor. He also served on many boards including the Cocoa Board, the Shippers Council, and many others as Board Member.

Alhaji Jawula was the Consulting and founding Director for the Otumfuo Centre for Traditional Leadership, UPSA from 2014 to 2019.

=== In Politics ===
Under the presidency of the later Flt. Lt. Jerry John Rawlings, he served as the Chief Executive Officer in Walewale between 1979 and 1980 as District Chief Executive for West Mamprusi District Council. He received several appointment under NPP administration of President J.A. Kuffuor. Jawula was former running mate aspirant/hopeful of the New Patriotic Party (NPP).
