= Kulmasa =

Coordinates: 9°42′N 2°30′W

Kulmasa is a town in the Sawla-Tuna-Kalba District, Savannah Region, Ghana. In the 1890s, it marked the southern frontier of the Kingdom of Wala.
