= Yagbonwura Tumtunba Boresa II =

Ghanaian monarch (died 2023)

Sulemana Tuntumba Boresa II (early 1930s – 4 February 2023) was the Overlord of the Gonja Kingdom and President of the Savannah Regional house of chiefs. He was enskinned in March 2010 after the demise of Bawah Abudu Doshie.

== Early life and education ==
Sulemana was born in the early 1930s to Yapeiwura Bakari the son of Yagbonwura Mahama of Kusawgu and Mma Nyenbali Chiraba. He was raised by his uncle in Zogu a village near Yapei after his father passed on. His father married eleven wives. Sulemana was the fourth born of the 30 children of his father.

== Career ==
He worked in the building and construction industry as a master in carpentry and joinery. In his private life, he worked with several organisations such as Ministry of Agriculture, Saba International Construction Company who constructed the Ghana Foods Distribution Depot in Tamale in 1957, SIMS Construction, Tamale Supplies, a construction firm, Tuffour Construction and many others. He later on joined the 48 Engineering Regiment and took part in the construction of the Kaladan Barracks, Kamina Barracks, and Barwah Barracks, base of the Airborne Force in Tamale.

In 1974 he was transferred to Savelugu Local Council as the clerk of council to set up that Administration.

He lived and worked in the Savelugu-Nantong Council over fifteen years until 1979 when he was finally transferred back to Tamale Municipal Assembly where he worked until his retirement in the year 1993.

== As Yagbonwura ==
Sulemana before his enskinement as Yagbonwura, he was the Paramount Chief of the Kusawgu Traditional Area of Gonja under the skin name Kusawguwura Sulemana Jakpa. Since Kusawgu was one of the five gates to the Yagbon seat of the kingdom he rose from being a paramount chief to be the Overlord. He was enskinned as Yagbonwura at Damongo in March 2010.
