= 1892 Sack of Salaga =

Gonja civil war in Ghana

Location	Salaga, Ghana 8°33′N 0°31′W

The 1892 Sack of Salaga was a Gonja civil war for the control of the town of Salaga that occurred on December 5, 1892. A rebellion led by Kabachewura Isifa and assisted by his Dagomba and Nanumba allies overthrew Kpembewura Napo who died in exile in the same year.

Yaa Naa Andani, the King of Dagbon at that time was against the disruption in the region, and sent a strongly worded letter to the incumbent Kpembewura Isanwurfo in 1894 to quell the internecine struggles to avoid further hurting trade in the slave market. The war led to a mass exodus of mostly Zongo people out of the region, significantly depleting its population and giving birth to a wave of Islamic proselytizing in the forest areas of modern Ghana.

== See also ==
- Konkomba-Nanumba conflict
