= Kingdom of Gonja =

Former country in present-day Ghana

Gonja Kingdom
- 1552–1899
- Status: Kingdom
- Capital: Yagbum and Old Buipe
- Common languages: Gonja
- Religion: Islam
- Government: Monarchy
- Yagbongwura
  - 1552–1582: Naba
- History
  - Established: 1552
  - Disestablished: 1899
| Preceded by | Succeeded by |
| Mali Empire | Northern Territories of the Gold Coast |

Gonja was a kingdom in present-day northern Ghana. It was originally founded around 1552 by Prince Naba who came from Mali. In some chronicles the kingdom was founded 1675 by Sumaila Ndewura Jakpa, who began a new dynasty in Gonja, becoming the first Yagbongwura, or paramount chief.

== Etymology ==
The name Gonja is a topoynym from the Hausa language, which predated the existence of the Gonja Kingdom.

== History ==
=== Founding and History ===
Page from the Kitāb al-balagh al-minan (the book of attaining destiny), written in Gonja or Dagomba

According to one written history, the kingdom was founded by a southern expedition from the Mali Empire in the mid-1500s, sent by Jighi Jarra (likely Mahmud III). Jarra requested gold tribute from Begho, but the state refused, causing him to send a cavalry force led by two princes; Umar and Naba. Umar stayed in Begho after its conquest whilst Naba attacked Buna (in modern-day Côte d'Ivoire) and then settled east of it around Buipe, a key town in the trade route from the Southern regions to the north. Naba ruled from 1552 until 1582. The kingdom converted to Islam under Naba's successor Manwura (reigned 1582–1600 or 1580–1599) who was converted by Muhammed Al-Abyad, a Muslim scholar who originally came from Begho with his father Faqih Isma'il, who became muslim advisors to the king. Manwura changed his name to Umaru Kura after his conversion. After King Umaru was his brother Amoah (r. 1600–1622) who constructed the first mosque in the kingdom, at the capital of Buipe, he also sent a representative of the kingdom on the Hajj pilgrimage to Mecca. The foundation of a new dynasty occurred after the fall of the dominant Songhai Empire (1591), when the Mandé Ngbanya tribe led by Sumaila Ndewura Jakpa (r. 1622–1699) migrated over the Black Volta River, conquering the Kingdom, founding the capital at Yagbum. The Ngbanya expanded rapidly, conquering several neighbors in the White Volta valley and beginning a profitable gold trade with the Akan states through nearby Begho. By 1675, the Gonja established a paramount chief, called the Yagbongwura, to control the kingdom. The Ngbanya dynasty has controlled this position from its founding to the present day, with only two brief interregnums. Jakpa appointed his sons to govern the main provincial towns of Tuluwe, Bole, Kpembe, Kasipe and Kawsaw. Jakpa and his successor Sa'ara (r. 1699–1697) launched a successful invasion of the Dagomba Kingdom , seizing Daboya in the salt producing region. Sa'ara was deposed in 1697 and followed by weak kings before the reign of Abbas who sacked Buna and Fugula in 1709. After Abbas' death, the kingdom became decentralised and local lords in provinces ruled autonomously. The kingdom had 15 provinces in total which swore Allegiance to the paramount king in Yagbum. Each province had their own army, royal courts and trade regulations. Each local ruler was eligible to be selected as king of the kingdom, but in practice the title usually went to the strongest local ruler.

During the early 1730s, there was a sucsession crisis between the chief of Bole called Safo, and the chief of Tuluwe called Kali. Kali defeated Safo, causing Safo and his followers to flee to Wa. Kali was followed by Saidu, chief of Kongo. Saidu requested the king of Wa hand over Safo, but the king refused, causing Saidu to invade Wa, however he was defeated. Gonja then allied with Gyaman to attack Wa, but this joint force was defeated. The king of Wa allied with the Asante (ruled by Kwaka Dua) and killed Saidu, expelling his forces from Daboya. Thereafter Gonja became a vassal state of the Asante Empire. In 1745 and 1751, the Asante waged war against the eastern province of Kpembe, this war was originally seen as negative by the people of Gonja, with Sidi Umar stating that Asantehene Opoku Ware was a kingdom who 'harmed the people of Gonja', however by the 1800s the invasions of the Asante were seen as having positively secured the region around Salaga (a prosperous Gonja trading city) and guaranteed continued trade.

Gonja became independent again in 1874 after the Anglo-Ashanti war. Gonja went to war again with Wa, after the province of Kong expanded towards the border with Wa. Kong was defeated and parts of the province were annexed. Jamani, the chief of Kong requested the help of Samori Ture, the warlord of the Wassalou Empire. In the late 1880s, Ture sent his son Sarankye Mori to defeat Wa and annex most of Gonja into the empire. Wassalou control lasted until the empire fell to the french in 1898. In 1892 in the east of Gonja a major war erupted between Kpembe and the Dagbon Kingdom, resulting in the destruction of Salaga. In 1895, Kpembe and Bole signed a friendship treaty with the British, which angered the German Empire who invaded the following year deposing the Kpembe chief. In 1897, Britain occupied most of Gonja and compelled the remaining chiefs to join the Gold Coast colony, the Germans also left Kpembe. The last remaining indepednet Chieftain in Salaga joined the Gold Coast colony in 1899, formally ending the Kingdom of Gonja. The kingdom remained a non-sovereign monarchy. The current Yagbongwura, Bikunuto Jewu Soale I, has held his position since 2023.

=== Islam in Gonja ===
Banda Nkwanta mosque

During the Ngbanya dynasty the prominence of Islamic scholars grew, these scholars mainly resided at the main towns of Yagbum and Buipe. It was at Buipe that the Kitāb Ghunja, the chronicle of the history of the kingdom was written by Sidi Umar bin Suma, Muhammed Ibn Al-Mustafā and Umar Kanandi Ibn Umar, written during the mid-1700s. The scholars of Buipe were closely associated with their counterparts in Buna, despite the fact that Buna was subjected to multiple raids from Gonja. There were multiple mosques in the Kingdom, such as the mosque at Buipe (built in the 1500s, yet to be found), Larabanga Mosque (founded in 1421), Banda Nkwata mosque (18th or 19th centuries), Maluwe Mosque (current structure dates to the 1900s), and Bole Mosque (current structure dates to 2023 after it collapsed). All of the mosques are in a Sudano-Sahelian architectural style and have white facades. The rulers of Gonja were only partially Islamised and still relied on traditional spiritualist customs and earth-priests.

== Trade and Economy ==
The kingdom's economy was largely agro-pastoralist due to its semi-arid landscape, however Buipe and Kaffaba were centres of various industries such as textile production and salt-mining, these towns contained markets and were connected to trade routes in the region. Gonja was at the crossroads between the gold and kola producing regions of Southern Ghana, and the main northern urban centres of Djenne and Kano. The Kano chronicle states how the trade route between Kano and the region of Gonja was founded in the mid-1400s. Over the centuries immigrants from Hausa regions and northern Malian regions converged in Gonja, creating diaspora groups, with many northern Ghanaian documents being written in Hausa. Hausa traders are mentioned in the Kitab Ghunja who had arrived in Buipe to trading Kola nuts from the Asante and Bunduku. As a result of this trade, the kingdom (rendered as 'Gonje') appeared on 18th Century European maps, one made by Guillaume Delisle in 1709, and another Jean-Baptiste Bourguignon d'Anville in 1749.

== Culture ==
The kingdom was divided into 3 social classes; the ruling elite called the Ngbanya, the muslim scholarly class called the Karamo and the rest of the subjects were called the Nyemasi. Most of the Nyemasi resided in the countryside.

== See also ==
- Gonja people
- List of rulers of the Northern state of Gonja
