= Tinga, Ghana =

Mining community in Savannah Region, Ghana

Tinga
- Town
- Location of Tinga in Savannah Region
- Coordinates: 08°35′17.74″N 02°13′42.17″W
- Country: Ghana
- Region: Savannah Region
- District: Bole District
- Time zone: UTC0 (GMT)

Tinga is a mining community in the Bole District (formerly in the Northern Region) and currently in the Savannah Region of Ghana. In 2025, John Mahama announced there was plans to construct a STEM Senior High School in the community. As at 2025, the Chief of the community was Seidu Sampson Abudu.

== Institutions ==
- Tinga Health Center
- Tinga market

== Notable natives ==
- Dramani Alhassan, Tinga Community youth secretary
