= Tinga =

Tinga may refer to:

== People ==
=== Surname ===
- Beniamina Tinga, I-Kiribati politician
- Dante Tinga (born 1939), Filipino politician and jurist
- Sigfrido Tiñga (born 1965), Filipino politician and businessman

=== Given name ===
- Tinga Seisay (1928–2015), Sierra Leonean diplomat and pro-democracy activist

=== Nickname or stage name ===
- Tinga (footballer, born 1978), Brazilian football midfielder
- Tinga (footballer, born 1981), Brazilian football defender
- Tinga (footballer, born 1990), Brazilian football midfielder
- Tinga (footballer, born 1993), Brazilian football right-back
- Tinga Stewart (born 1950), Jamaican reggae singer
- Raila Odinga (born 1945), Prime Minister of Kenya 2008–2013

== Other uses ==
- Tangier, Morocco, sometimes identified as Tinga in ancient sources
- Tinga (dish), a Mexican dish
- Tinga Nursery, a historic plant nursery near Wrightsboro, North Carolina, U.S.
- Tinga, a genre of popular music of Guinea-Bissau
- Tinga, a town in Savannah Region, Ghana
