= Kpalbe =

- District Capital
- Location of Kpalbe
- Coordinates: 9°6′56″N 0°33′1″W
- Country: Ghana
- Region: Savannah Region
- District: North East Gonja District
- Elevation: 252 m (827 ft)
- Time zone: GMT
  - Summer (DST): GMT
- Ghana Post GPS: N425683

Kpalbe or Palbe is a town in the Savannah Region of Ghana. It is the capital of the North East Gonja District.

== Location ==
Kpalbe lies south east to Tamale the capital of the Northern Region. Towns to the north are Bung (Gbung) and Chanbulugu. Kwisini and Chandayili are found to the east. Towards the south are JIdanyile, Palbusi and Wala. Its western neighbours are Vano, Deboko, Panshiaw and Changburi. Damongo, the capital of the Savannah Region is 172 kilometres by road to the west of Kpalbe.

== See also ==
- North East Gonja District
- Salaga North (Ghana parliament constituency)

== External links and sources ==
- North East Gonja District Official website
- Palbe on Wikimapia.org
