= Bole Senior High School =

Senior high school in Savannah Region, Ghana

- Bole, Savannah Region; Ghana

Information
- Type: secondary/high school
- Established: 1979 (47 years ago)
- Grades: Forms [1-3]

Bole Senior High School is a second cycle school in Bole in the Bole District in the Savannah Region of Ghana. The current headmasters are Mr Albertos Mahama and Reverend Father Corlenius Begua Termaghre.

== History ==
The school was established in 1979.
