= Gbinyiri =

Farming community in Savannah Region, Ghana

Gbinyiri (also known as Gbenyiri or Gbiniyiri) is a farming community in the Sawla-Tuna-Kalba District in the Savannah Region of Ghana. It borders Ivory Coast and Burkina Faso.

== Gbinyiri conflict ==
In August 2025, a land dispute erupted after a chief sold a land to a private developer in the community. The violence started after the developer attempted to commence work which led to confrontations. The clashes forced thousands to flee from the community. Some fled to the Ivory Coast, and later returned. Some also fled to the Wenchi Municipality in the Bono Region of Ghana.
