= List of rulers of the Northern state of Gonja =

== List of rulers of Gonja, a kingdom located in the north of Ghana ==
(Dates in italics indicate de facto continuation of office)

Tenure	Incumbent	Notes
c. 1600	Invasion by Ngbanya clan, from Songhay in Mali
1675	Establishment of Gonja paramount ruler Yagbongwura
Yagbongwura (Paramount Rulers)
Ngbanya dynasty
1675 to 1698	Sumaila Ndewura Jakpa, Yagbongwura
1698 to 1698	Limu, Yagbongwura
1698 to 1709	Sulemana Jakpa	In rebellion
1698 to 1698	Lanyon, Regent
1698 to 1699	Lanyon, Yagbongwura
1699 to February 1709	Abbas
February 1709 to 25 May 1709	Abbas, Yagbongwura
1709 to 1712	Mahama Labayiru, Yagbongwura
1712 to ????	Bur' Lanyon, Regent
???? to ????	Kankanga, Yagbongwura
???? to ????	Safu, Yagbongwura
???? to ????	Kali, Yagbongwura
???? to 1858	Jakpa, Yagbongwura
1858 to 1873	Nyantachi, Yagbongwura
1873 to 18??	Jiau, Yagbongwura
18?? to 18??	Kpirku, Yagbongwura
18?? to 1891	Kurbang, Yagbongwura
1891 to 1896	Interregnum
1896 to 1907	Pontomprong, Yagbongwura
1907 to 1909	Lanyon, Yagbongwura
1909 to 1912	Interregnum
1912 to 1937	Dangbonga, Yagbongwura
1937 to 1942	Banbanga, Yagbongwura
1942 to 1942	Singbing Lanyon, Yagbongwura
1942 to 1975	Ewuntoma, Yagbongwura
1975 to 1982	Kurabaso, Yagbongwura
1983 to 26 January 1987	Timu, Yagbongwura
1987 to 1990	Kanyiti, Yagbongwura
1990 to 1992	Bi-Awuribi, Yagbongwura
1992 to 1993	Ale Adengi Tikpiri, Yagbongwura
7 December 1993 to 2000	Bore Nyinche, Yagbongwura
2000 to 2010	Bawah Abudu Doshie, Yagbongwura
March 2010 to 2023	Yagbonwura Tumtunba Boresa II, Yagbonwura	Died on February 4, 2023
March 2023 to present	Bikunuto Jewu Soale I, Yagbongwura

== See also ==
- Ghana
- Gold Coast
- Lists of office-holders
