= Abu Seidu =

Ghanaian football striker (born 1987)

Personal information
- Full name: Abu Seidu
- Date of birth: 18 January 1987 (age 39)
- Place of birth: Daboya, Ghana
- Height: 1.65 m (5 ft 5 in)
- Positions: Right midfielder; winger

Youth career
- Feyenoord Academy
- Corners Babies

Senior career*
Years	Team	Apps	(Gls)
2000–2005	Feyenoord Academy		
2005–2007	Corners Babies	15	(7)
2007–2008	King Faisal Babes	10	(4)
2009–2011	Cha Choeng Sao F.C.	18	(8)
2011–2013	Air Force United F.C.	64	(21)
2013--2014	Phatthalung F.C.	17	(6)
- * Club domestic league appearances and goals

Abu Seidu (born 18 January 1987) is a Ghanaian football striker. He is a product of Feyenoord Fetteh. Abu gained promotion to play for the youth team of Fetteh's mother club Feyenoord Rotterdam.

== Career ==
Abu started his playing in Ghana as a school boy and his talent was discovered by Coach Sam Ardey the former Ghana Under 17 world champion coach. He was selected among the young best players in Ghana and taken to one of the best football academies in Ghana Feyenoord Academy. In 2000, he joined his team to Asc mimosa in Ivery Coast to play cacacola tournament and South Africa, U-18 Supersports tournament where he helped his team to be the champions. He then again joined his team to represent one of the best tournaments in the Netherlands in 2002, and once again won the trophy. In 2004, Abu spent some time at Excelsior, RKTVC FC in the Netherlands and he did fantastic work to lead his team to take the Trophy. He then returned to Ghana help his formal club (Feyenoord Academy) to qualify for the Premier League in Ghana in 2005. He returned to play for Kumasi based Cornerstones in the Poly Tank Division one, where he was then transferred to King Faisal Babes in the Ghana Premier League. From there he moved to Thailand, playing clubs named Chachoengsao FC, Thai Summit Samut Prakan F.C., Phattalung F.C. and lastly playing his trade for Air Force United F.C. in the Division 1.
