= Daboya, Ghana =

Daboya
- Village
- Location of Daboya in Savannah Region, Northern Ghana
- Coordinates: 9°31′49″N 1°22′56″W
- Country: Ghana
- Region: Savannah Region
- District: North Gonja District
- Elevation: 338 ft (103 m)
- Time zone: GMT
  - Summer (DST): GMT

Daboya is the capital of the North Gonja district, a district in the Savannah Region of north Ghana. It used to be called Burugu by the Dagomba people. It was important in the trade route the stretched from Yendi to Bouna. This made Daboya one of the most important towns in Dagbon as at then. Today Daboya is represented by the Daboya-Mankarigu constituency. It is considered a historical place in Ghana. There is an Army Special Operations Training School at Daboya.

Daboya is inhabited by the Gonja, Tampulma, Dagomba, and Hanga.

== History ==
Daboya was an important salt trading settlement in the Kingdom of Dagbon. In the late 1600s, it was invaded and is now under Gonja control. The Wasipewura came from Wasipe to establish Daboya as a border fortress to defend against Dagomba. It was attacked by the Ashanti Empire in 1844.

Daboya's glorious days of salt production are now in the past, especially as large scale salt mining industries, such as Electrochem, are established at Ada.

== Smock Industry ==
Daboya has a robust and unique smock industry.

== Notable people ==
- Abu Seidu (born 1987), footballer
