= Yagbum =

Yagbum Yabum
- Town
- Location of Yagbum in Savannah Region, Ghana
- Coordinates: 10°00′N 1°19′W
- Country: Ghana
- Region: Savannah Region
- District: North Gonja District

Population
  - Ethnicities: Gonja people
- Time zone: GMT

Yagbum, also spelled Yabum, is a town in Ghana, and the former capital city of the Gonja kingdom founded by Naba'a of the Ngbanya dynasty. Naba'a reigned from 1552/3 to 1582/3.
