= Sawla-Tuna-Kalba District =

District in Savannah Region, Ghana

- District
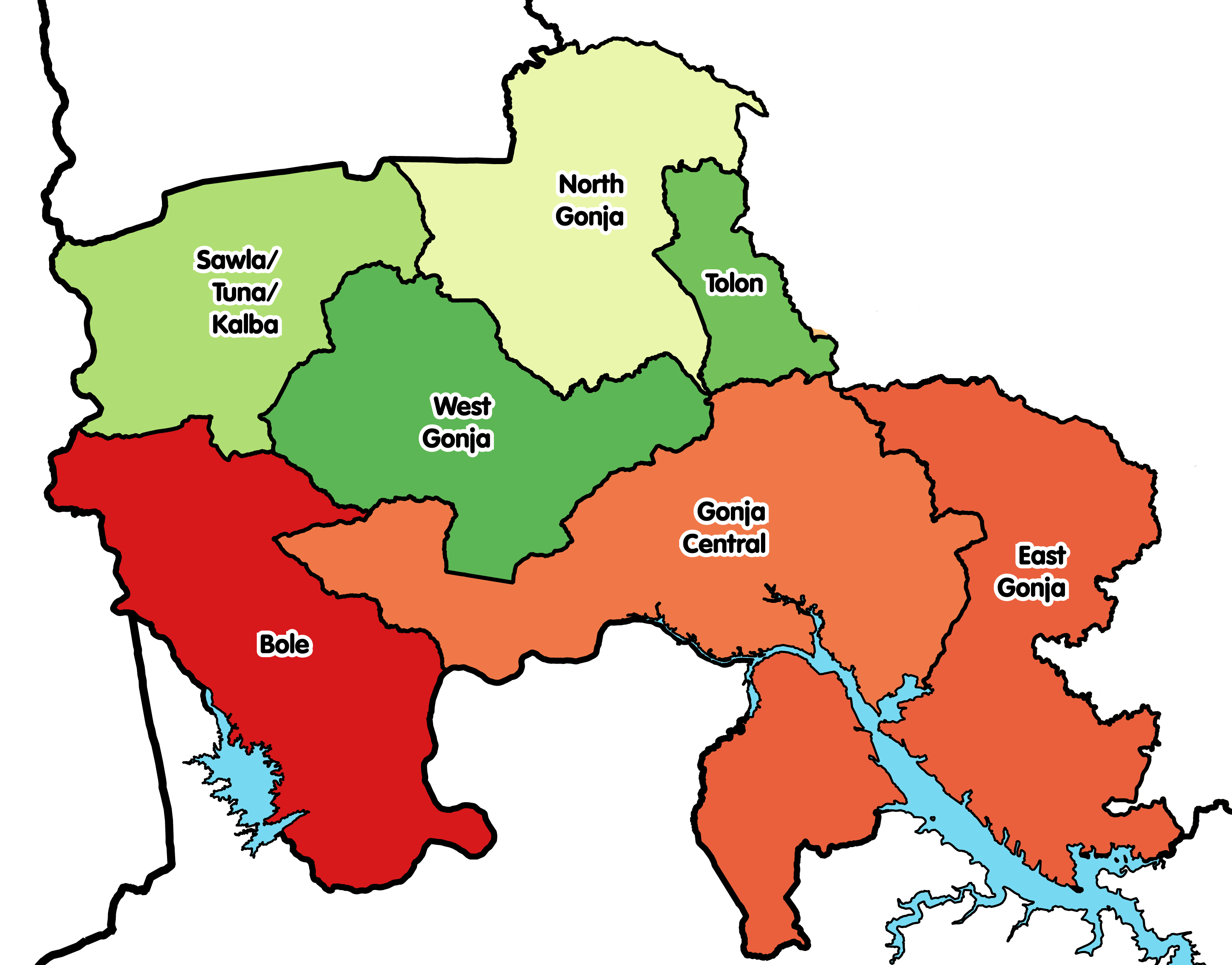
- Districts of Savannah Region

- Location of Sawla-Tuna-Kalba District within Savannah
- Coordinates: 9°17′N 2°25′W
- Country: Ghana
- Region: Savannah
- Capital: Sawla

Government
  - District Executive: Mumuni Isaac Dramani

Area
  - Total: 4,601 km^{2} (1,776 sq mi)

Population (2021)
  - Total: 112,664
- Time zone: UTC+0 (GMT)
- ISO 3166 code: GH-SA-ST

Sawla-Tuna-Kalba District is one of the seven districts in Savannah Region, Ghana. Originally it was formerly part of the then-larger Bole District in 1988, until the northern part of the district was split off by a decree of president John Agyekum Kufuor on 27 August 2004 to create Sawla-Tuna-Kalba District; thus the remaining part has been retained as Bole District. The district assembly is located in the western part of Savannah Region and has Sawla as its capital town.

== Localities ==
- Kulmasa
- Gbinyiri

== See also ==
- "Districts of Ghana". Statoids.
