= Kingdom of Wala =

The Kingdom of Wala was a polity in what is today Ghana based around Wa. According to some traditions it had an imam as early as 1317.

In the early 1890s, Wala was largely west of the Kulpawn River. Its western boundary was the Black Volta. The north-east corner of the territory was at Dasima, and the south-west corner was at Tantama. Kulmasa marked its southern boundary.

In 1894, there was a rebellion in the northern part of the Kingdom of Wala, and this area separated off into an independent kingdom.

== Sources ==
- Ivor Wilks, Wa and the Wala: Islam and polity in northwestern Ghana (Cambridge: Cambridge University Press, 1988).
