= Chumburu =

Ethnic group in Ghana

The Chumburu are part of the Guan ethnic group in Ghana. In Northern Ghana, they are located in the Kpandai District; in the Oti Region, they are dominant in the Krachi East, Krachi West and Krachi-Chumburung Districts; and in Brong-Ahafo, they are dominant in the Yeji, Pru and Atebobu Districts. Both traditional areas of Chumburung in Brong-Ahafo and Volta regions are on the shores of Lake Volta.

The Chumburu speak the Chumburung and French languages.
