= Bole, Ghana =

Bole
- District Capital
- Location of Bole in Savannah region
- Coordinates: 9°2′N 2°29′W
- Country: Ghana
- Region: Savannah Region
- District: Bole District

Government
  - Bolewura: Safo Kutugefeso

Population (2013)
  - Total: —
- Time zone: GMT
  - Summer (DST): GMT

Bole is a small town and is the capital of Bole district, a district in the Savannah Region of northern Ghana. Bole is connected by road to the town of Sawla and the town of Bamboi. Bole is home to the Bole District Hospital and post office. The Bole District covers an area of 4800 km2 land mass and has a population of about 87,656.

== History ==
Bole was founded as a trading center by Wangara immigrants, the same group that were the progenitors of the Dyula of Begho, Bouna, Bondoukou and Kong. The town was located on an important regional trade route for kola nuts linking the Manding region with Hausaland, and was a part of the Gonja kingdom.

In 1818 Bole fought a war against the Ashanti Empire. When they lost, the victors deposed the ruling Timite family of imams and replaced them with the Kamaghate. The Bolewura, leader of the historical Bole chiefdom and current Traditional Area, moved his seat to Bole in 1868.

== Institutions ==
- Bole Senior High School
- Bole District Police Command
- Bole District Government Hospital
- Nkilgi FM

== Notable natives ==
- John Dramani Mahama

== Climate ==
Climate data for Bole (1991–2020)
Month	Jan	Feb	Mar	Apr	May	Jun	Jul	Aug	Sep	Oct	Nov	Dec	Year
Record high °C (°F)	39.6 (103.3)	41.5 (106.7)	41.5 (106.7)	41.0 (105.8)	38.5 (101.3)	36.1 (97.0)	34.4 (93.9)	34.0 (93.2)	33.8 (92.8)	36.0 (96.8)	38.1 (100.6)	39.0 (102.2)	41.5 (106.7)
Mean daily maximum °C (°F)	35.5 (95.9)	37.0 (98.6)	37.0 (98.6)	35.0 (95.0)	33.2 (91.8)	31.2 (88.2)	29.7 (85.5)	29.2 (84.6)	30.2 (86.4)	32.2 (90.0)	34.3 (93.7)	35.1 (95.2)	33.3 (91.9)
Daily mean °C (°F)	26.8 (80.2)	29.1 (84.4)	30.4 (86.7)	29.6 (85.3)	28.3 (82.9)	26.8 (80.2)	25.7 (78.3)	25.4 (77.7)	25.9 (78.6)	26.9 (80.4)	27.0 (80.6)	26.2 (79.2)	27.3 (81.1)
Mean daily minimum °C (°F)	18.1 (64.6)	21.1 (70.0)	23.7 (74.7)	24.1 (75.4)	23.4 (74.1)	22.4 (72.3)	21.8 (71.2)	21.6 (70.9)	21.5 (70.7)	21.6 (70.9)	19.7 (67.5)	17.3 (63.1)	21.4 (70.5)
Record low °C (°F)	11.0 (51.8)	13.5 (56.3)	15.6 (60.1)	19.2 (66.6)	19.2 (66.6)	18.7 (65.7)	18.7 (65.7)	18.0 (64.4)	17.2 (63.0)	15.0 (59.0)	9.5 (49.1)	10.1 (50.2)	9.5 (49.1)
Average precipitation mm (inches)	3.2 (0.13)	15.9 (0.63)	46.0 (1.81)	104.7 (4.12)	128.9 (5.07)	139.6 (5.50)	137.2 (5.40)	155.4 (6.12)	198.7 (7.82)	111.0 (4.37)	18.5 (0.73)	4.2 (0.17)	1,063.3 (41.86)
Average precipitation days (≥ 1.0 mm)	0.2	1.0	3.5	6.3	8.5	9.5	9.2	9.9	14.1	9.0	1.8	0.3	73.3
Mean monthly sunshine hours	255.0	228.2	228.2	225.0	232.8	180.3	151.5	133.0	155.2	230.1	243.9	244.1	2,507.3
Source: NOAA
