= University of Cape Coast Hospital =

Geography
- Location: Pioneer Road, Cape Coast, Ghana, Ghana
- Coordinates: 5.105335°N 1.282972°W

Organisation
- Affiliated university: University of Cape Coast

History
- Opened: 1962

Links
- Lists: Hospitals in Ghana

The University of Cape Coast Hospital is located on the campus of the University of Cape Coast. The hospital provides services to both the university and the communities surrounding the university.

The hospital has several sections: the outpatient clinic department (OPD), the medical laboratory, the male and female wards, and the children's ward.

== History ==
The hospital started in 1962 as a clinic located close to the school's administration block.
