= Salifu Adam Braimah =

Ghanaian politician (1965–2026)

Member of the Ghana Parliament for Salaga South Constituency

Personal details
- Born: 25 September 1965
- Died: 12 April 2026 (aged 60) Accra, Ghana
- Party: New Patriotic Party

Salifu Adam Braimah (25 September 1965 – 12 April 2026) was a Ghanaian politician who was a member of the Seventh Parliament of the Fourth Republic of Ghana representing the Salaga South Constituency in the Northern Region on the ticket of the New Patriotic Party. His father was Joseph Adam Braimah.

Braimah died in Accra on 12 April 2026, at the age of 60.
