= Buipe =

- District Capital
- Location of Buipe in Savannah Region Buipe (Africa)
- Coordinates: 08°47′00″N 01°32′00″W
- Country: Ghana
- Region: Savannah Region
- District: Central Gonja District
- Elevation: 436 ft (133 m)

Population (2013)
  - Total: —
- Time zone: GMT
  - Summer (DST): GMT

Buipe, sometimes called New Buipe, is a town and the capital of Central Gonja District, in the Savannah Region of northern Ghana.

== History ==
New Buipe was founded in the 1950s when the population of Old Buipe moved east to the site of a new bridge and highway. Buipe had been an important political and religious center of the Gonja kingdom since the 16th century.

Because of the proximity of limestone deposits, Buipe is the proposed location of cement works. The Black Volta, one of the most important rivers in the country passes through the town, making Buipe one of the leading market centres in the northern part of Ghana.
