= Kpabia =

- Town
- Location of Kpabia in Northern region
- Coordinates: 9°15′N 0°15′W
- Country: Ghana
- Region: Northern Region
- District: Yendi Municipal District
- Elevation: 633 ft (193 m)

Population (2013)
  - Total: —
- Time zone: GMT
  - Summer (DST): GMT

Kpabia is a small town in the Yendi Municipal district, a district in the Northern Region of Ghana.
