= Sumaila Ndewura Jakpa =

Founder of the Gonja Kingdom

Ndewura Jakpa (Jakpa according to some historians in Gonja "Daa-Kpa Pia-Kpa, which means Conqueror through spear or the Spear Holder) was an African king, founder of the Gonja kingdom (now part of northern Ghana), in the early 17th century.

== History of the Gonjas ==
According to Britannica: "Originally a Mande invader, Jakpa established a loosely knit federation of states that extended over areas of northern part of present-day Ghana and parts of Togo and Benin." In the about second half of the sixteenth century, Gonja was founded by Mande Warriors and Mali traders with Naba or Nabaga as their leader. The area between the Black and White Volta were known for trade so it attracted them. The Mande Chief sent the Nabaga on an errand to discover if there was a fall in the gold supply to Mali. The Gonjas had their name from a 'corrupt' Hausa phrase Kasa Goro-Jaa which meant the Land of Red Cola. Ngbanye was the indigenous name of the Gonjas which means Brave Men. The Hausas of Sokoto and the Gonjas used to trade in cola-nuts. The Gonjas had their cola-nut supplies from the Ashantis which transported to the Salaga market. The Hausas demand in cola-nuts was high so they used to travel to the lands of the Gonjas to buy them.

== Founding the Gonja Kingdom ==
Sumaila was said to be a trader himself who was from Malle or Mande. He became bankrupt and consulted a soothsayer about his fortunes in life. The man told him he would not ascend the throne even though he was from the royal family. He told Sumaila, his fortune was in foreign lands and that was where he would attain Kingdom for himself, his children and the people who follow him. He mobilized many fighting men and went out with them after he was convinced of what the soothsayer told him. It was said he used to invade many areas and left behind sons and servants who were loyal to him as either a Chief or as their leader.

His first point of entry into the Gonja Kingdom was in a town in Bole State called, Ntereso-Bonfu. He defeated a certain fetish priest after he was informed there was a powerful shrine at Mankuma. He went there and displayed black power and made a show of strength. He made his sister and nephew the leaders there.

== Death ==
Sumaila intended fighting the Ashantis but his army were tired because of the constant going to battle from all sides of the Gonja Kingdom. He did not heed to their warnings against fighting the Ashantis. He crossed the White Volta and a battle occurred between him and the Ashantis towards Yeji to Kabako. He was badly wounded and before he died, he commanded that his body be sent to his sister's burial place in Makuma. When they got to Abrumase which means (I am weak), he got very sick. He died at Trekpa which means (my end). His followers continued to Gbipe and Gbi means (Weight or Heavy Load) to accomplish Sumaila's wish. His corpse was getting spoilt so the body was interred in Gbuipe. His tomb can still be found in Old Buipe in the Central Gonja District of the Gonja Kingdom.

== Legacies ==
He appreciated the strength of diversity and inclusion.

He did not discriminate or marginalized against any of his subjects no matter the tribe. He had encounters with Muslim Scholars who were not Gonjas and made some of them his trusted advisors and leaders.

He did not show prejudice or treat with contempt people from Hausalands and Baribari at Kafaba. He enskinned people of other tribes as Chiefs in places he defeated.
