= Alhassan Abdallah Iddi =

Ghanaian politician

Hon. Alhassan Abdallah Iddi
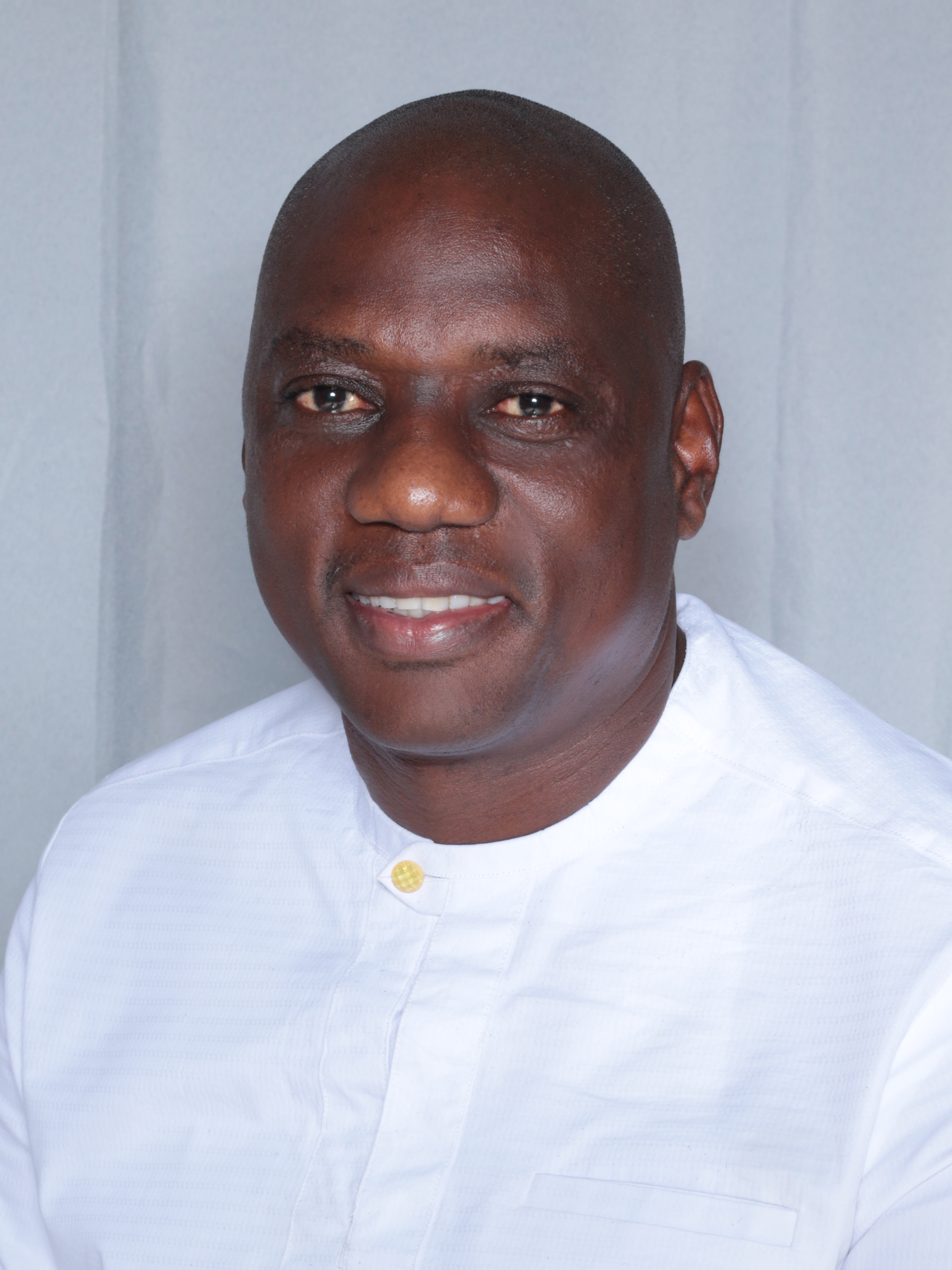

Member of Parliament for Salaga Northconstituency
- Incumbent
- Assumed office 7 January 2021

Personal details
- Born: Alhassan Abdallah Iddi; 22 February 1976 (age 50) KPALBUSI, Ghana
- Party: New Patriotic Party
- Occupation: Politician
- Committees: Judiciary Committee, Foreign Affairs Committee

Alhassan Abdallah Iddi (born 22 February 1976) is a Ghanaian politician who is a member of the New Patriotic Party. He is the member of parliament for the Salaga North Constituency.

== Early life and education ==
Alhassan Abdallah Iddi hails from Kpalbusi. He attended Kalipohen senior high school in tamale. He holds HIgher National Diploma in Accountancy, Tamale Technical University.He holds a Master in Organization Development (Od Consultancy)

== Personal life ==
Alhassan Abdallah Iddi is a muslim.
