= Ibrahim Dey Abubakari =

Ghanaian politician

Ibrahim Dey Abubakari (born March 25, 1958) is a Ghanaian politician and member of the Sixth Parliament of the Fourth Republic of Ghana representing the Salaga South Constituency in the Northern Region on the ticket of the National Democratic Congress.

== Early life and education ==
Abubakari was born on March 25, 1958. He hails from Sirimunchu, a town in the Northern Region of Ghana. He entered Manchester Business School, University of Wales, UK and obtained his master's degree in finance in 1996. He also attended Associates of Cost and Management Accountants in 1993.

== Politics ==
Abubakari is a member of the National Democratic Congress (NDC). In 2012, he contested for the Salaga South seat on the ticket of the NDC sixth parliament of the fourth republic and won. He began his political career in 2009 after being declared winner of the 2008 Ghanaian General Elections and elected into the 5th parliament of the 4th republic of Ghana.

== Personal life ==
Abubakari is a Muslim. He is married with five children. He worked as the Director of Internal Audit at the Ministry of Local Government in Accra.
