= North East Gonja District =

District in Savannah region, Ghana

- District
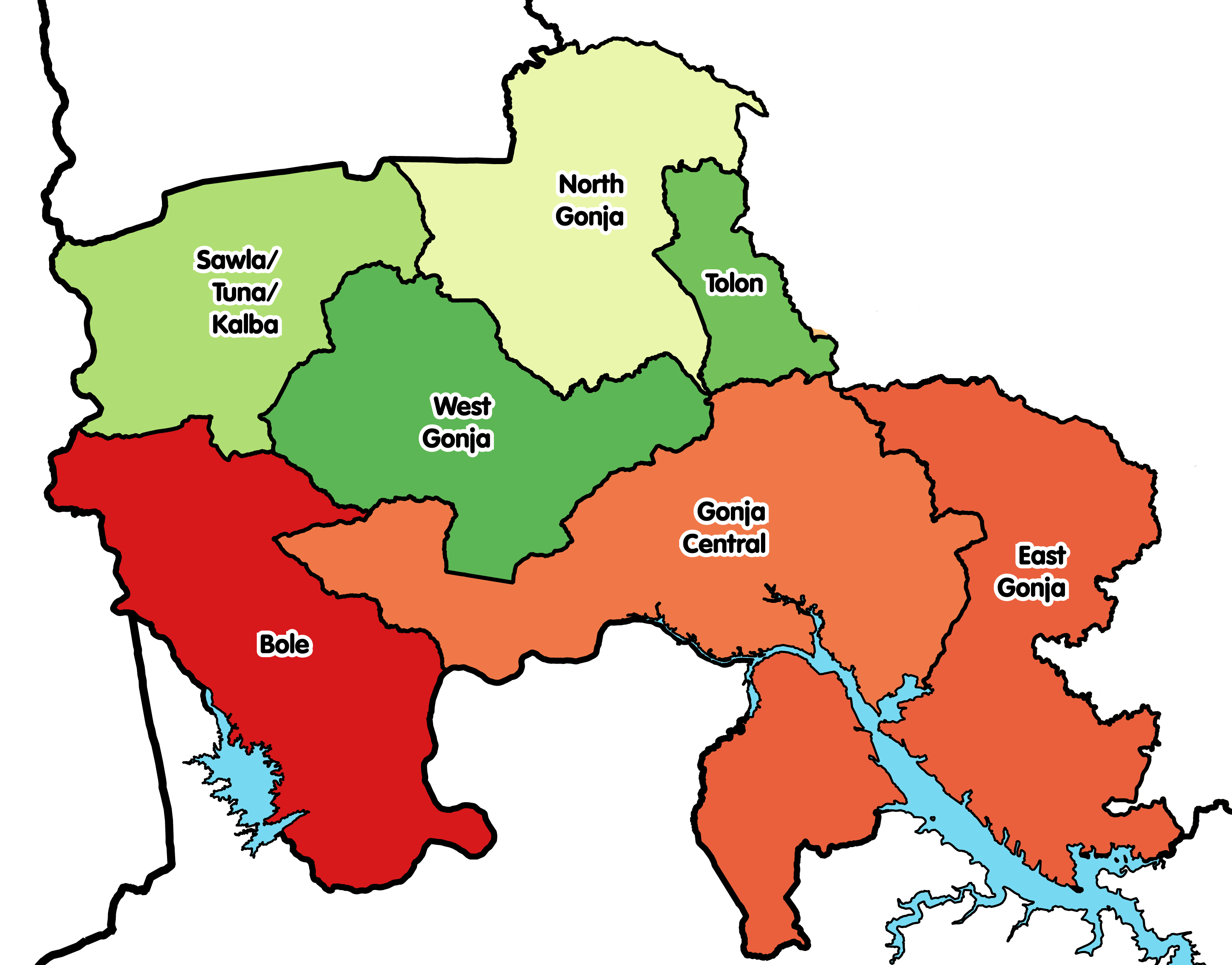
- Districts of Savannah Region

- Location of North East Gonja District within Savannah
- Coordinates: 9°6′56″N 0°33′1″W
- Country: Ghana
- Region: Savannah
- Capital: Kpalbe

Government
  - District Executive: Mumuni Isaac Dramani

Area
  - Total: 4,601 km^{2} (1,776 sq mi)

Population (2021)
  - Total: 39,404
- Time zone: UTC+0 (GMT)
- ISO 3166 code: GH-SA-NE

North East Gonja District is one of the seven districts in Savannah Region, Ghana. Originally it was formerly part of the then-larger East Gonja District in 1988, until the northern part of the district was split off to create North East Gonja District on 19 February 2019; while the remaining part has been retained as East Gonja Municipal District (which it was elevated to municipal district assembly status on 15 March 2018). The district assembly is located in the eastern part of Savannah Region and has Kpalbe as its capital town.

== Sub-divisions ==
The North East Gonja District covers an area of approximately 3,174 square kilometers, comprising 86 communities. These communities can be categorized into Jantong, Kakpande and Kpanshegu, each having a paramount chief. These are divided into 12 electoral areas managed under two main councils. The district features features a predominantly rural landscape characterized by Guinea Savanna Vegetation. Major water bodies such as the Volta Lake and the Dakar River cut through the district at the Libi community and others. The district experiences a single rainy season, as many places in Ghana, which comes mostly in May to October. From the 2021 census, it has a total of 39,404.

== Economic background ==
Communal fishing.

Agriculture and trading is the main economic activities. The district has vast fertile land, making farming contributor to the economy, with major crops including yam, maize, cassava, beans and sorghum. There are two active markets in the district, located in Kpalbe and bunjai.

== Challenges ==
The district's economy is affected by poor road network, making transportation of farm products difficult and costly. This also affects access to markets and health care.
