= Kpandai District =

District in Northern Region, Ghana

Kpandai District Nawuri
- District
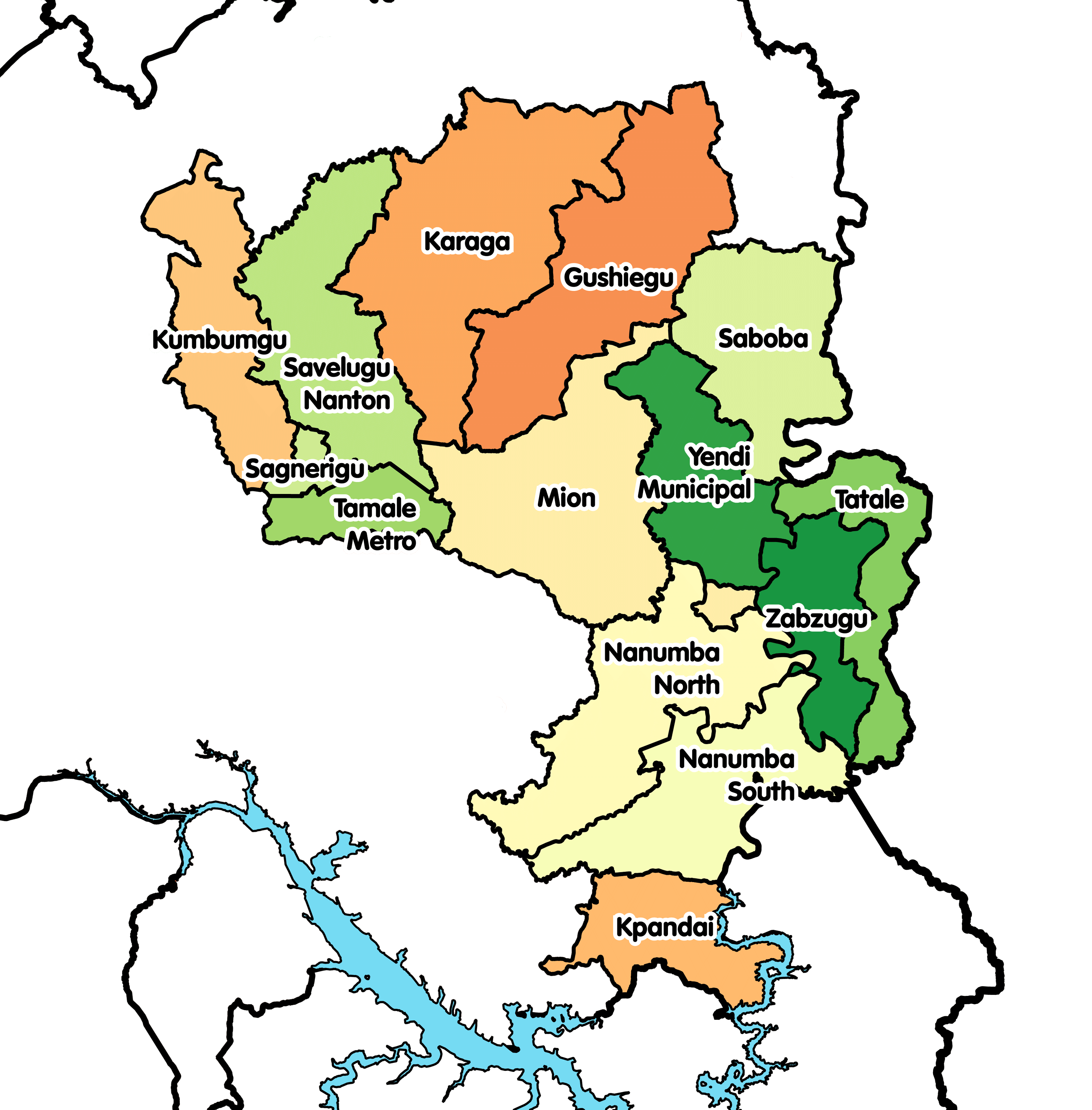
- Districts of Northern Region

- Location of Kpandai District within Northern Region, Ghana
- Coordinates: 8°28′12″N 0°1′12″W
- Country: Ghana
- Region: Northern
- Capital: Kpandai

Government
  - District Executive: Hon. Atta Kofi Tatablata

Area
  - Total: 1,772 km^{2} (684 sq mi)

Population (2021)
  - Total: 126,213
- Time zone: UTC+0 (GMT)
- ISO 3166 code: GH-NP-KP

Kpandai District is one of the sixteen districts in Northern Region, Ghana. Originally it was formerly part of the then-larger East Gonja District in 1988, until the eastern part of the district was split off by a decree of president John Agyekum Kufuor on 29 February 2008 to create Kpandai District.; thus the remaining part has been retained as East Gonja Municipal District. The district assembly is located in the southern part of Northern Region and has Kpandai as its capital town.

== Geography ==
The district shares boundaries with East Gonja to the west, Nanumba South to the north, Nkwanta North and Nkwanta South to the East and Krachi West to the south.

== Population ==
The district is largely rural, with approximately 90% of the population engaged in local agriculture. As of the 2010 census, the district population was 108,816 and included at least 24 different ethnic groups. The district has a total population of 108,816, which is made up of 54,997 (50.54 percent) males and 53,819 (49.46 percent) females. The district has an urban population of 10,824 representing 9.9 percent and rural population 97,992 representing 90.1 percent.

== Sources ==
- "Districts of Ghana". Statoids.
- GhanaDistricts.com
- GhanaDistricts.com
