= Kpandai =

Kpandai Kpandae
- Town & District Capital
- Location of Kpandai in Northern region
- Coordinates: 8°28′12″N 0°1′12″W
- Country: Ghana
- Region: Northern Region
- District: Kpandai District

Population (2012)
  - Total: 11,239
- Time zone: GMT
  - Summer (DST): GMT

Kpandai is a town and is the capital of Kpandai district, a district in the Northern Region of north Ghana. Kpandai had a 2012 settlement population of 11,239 people.

Kpandai is counter claimed by the Gonjas and Nawuris both of the Guan ethnic extraction. The contention led to several skirmishes in the early 1990s which the Nawuri's defeated the Gonja's.

Kpandai is inhabited by different groups including, the Nawuris, the Komkombas, the Bassares and the Kotokolis. There are also other smaller groups including Akan trading settlers. Kpandai is both in the Northern Volta and the Southern tip of the Northern region. The inhabitants are predominantly farmers who engage in farming yam and grains such as corn. Most of the yams are shipped to the capital Accra and further on abroad. The town has produced many university graduates over the years many of who have gone on to do well. Most of these would have had their Secondary education in Salaga, and the many secondary schools in Tamale. Kpandai is known for its many mangoe trees and a little plantation of Coconut.

The Catholic Church, the Seventh Day Adventist Church of Ghana and the Church of Pentecost are the biggest religious organisations. There is however also a sizeable Muslim population and Islam is growing. Many of the inhabitants combine traditional religious beliefs and Western/Arabian religions.
