= Bole District =

Bole Municipality
- District
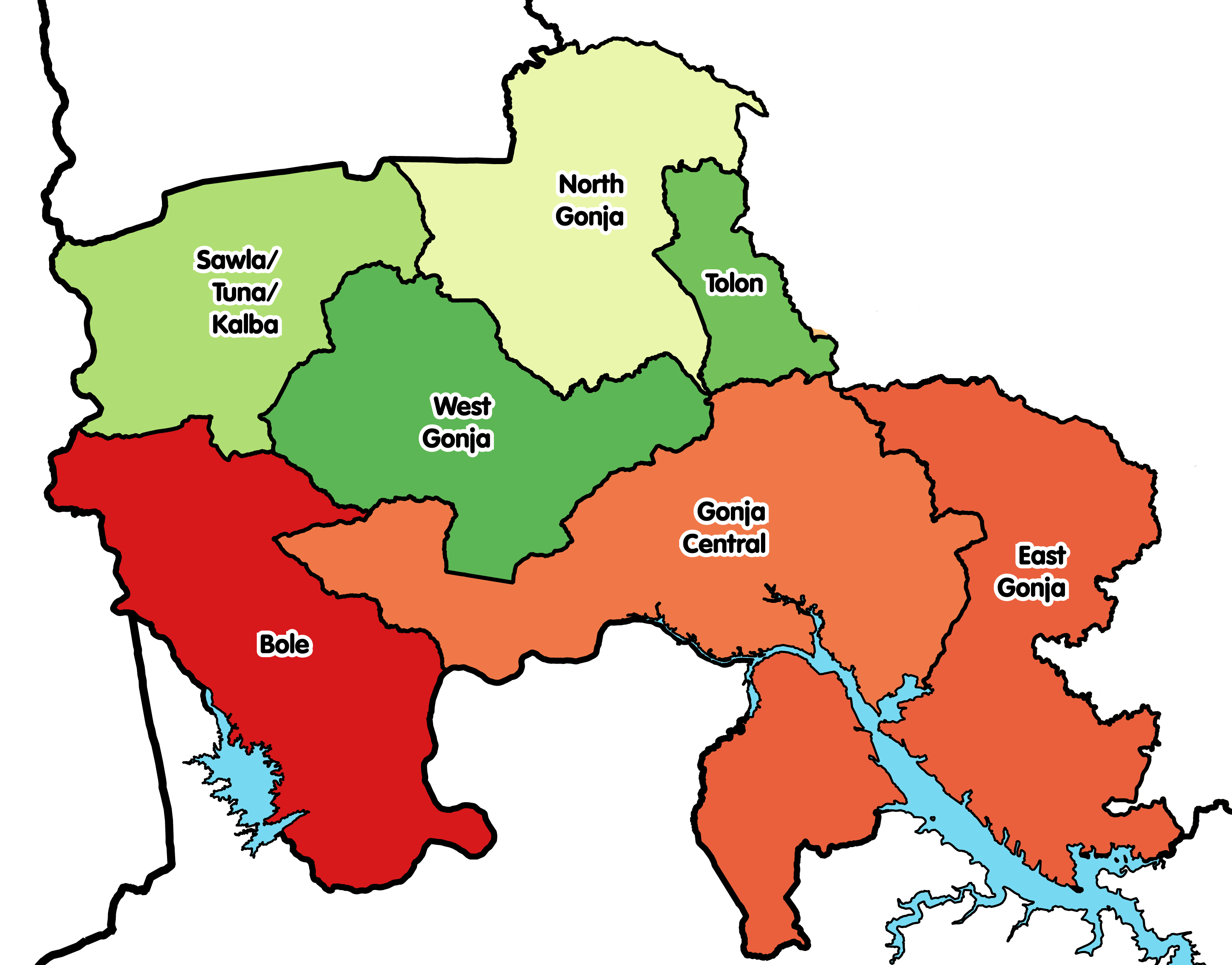
- Districts of Savannah Region

- Location of Bole Municipal within Savannah
- Coordinates: 9°2′2.4″N 2°29′6″W
- Country: Ghana
- Region: Savannah
- Capital: Bole

Government
  - District Chief Executive: Veronica Alele Heming

Area
  - Total: 9,631 km^{2} (3,719 sq mi)

Population (2021)
  - Total: 115,800
- Time zone: UTC+0 (GMT)
- ISO 3166 code: GH-SA-BO

Bole Municipal is one of the seven districts in Savannah Region, Ghana. Originally created as an ordinary district assembly in 1988, until the northern part of the district was split off by a decree of president John Agyekum Kufuor on 27 August 2004 to create Sawla-Tuna-Kalba District; thus the remaining part has been retained as Bole Municipal. The municipal assembly is located in the western part of Savannah Region and has Bole as its capital town.

== See also ==
- "Districts of Ghana". Statoids.
