= Gonja language =

North Guang language of Ghana

Gonja, Ngbanya, Ngbanyito
- Native to: Ghana
- Region: Northern Ghana
- Ethnicity: Gonja people
- Native speakers: 300,000 (2013)
- Language family: Niger–Congo?: Atlantic–Congo; Volta-Congo; Benue-Congo; Kwa; Potou–Tano; Tano; Guang; Gonja, Ngbanya, Ngbanyito

Language codes
- ISO 639-3: gjn
- Glottolog: gonj1241

The Gonja language, properly called Ngbanya or Ngbanyito, is a North Guang language spoken by an estimated 230,000 people, almost all of whom are of the Gonja ethnic group of northern Ghana. Related to Guang languages in the south of Ghana, it is spoken by about a third of the population in the northern region. The Brong-Ahafo and Volta regions lie to the south of the Gonja-speaking area, while Dagombas, Mamprussis and Walas are to the north. Its dialects are Gonja and Choruba.

== Alphabet ==
Vowels used are: a, e, i, o,ɔ, u,ɛ. Consonants include: ch [tʃ], ŋm, ny, gb, kp, sh [ʃ].

== Pronouns ==
Personal pronouns as subject of the sentence:

	singular	plural
1st person	ma	anye
2nd person	fo	fo, minye
3rd person	e, mu	bumu, baa

== Names ==
Common Usage	Full name	Meaning
Achaŋso	Achaŋso ni ba bi dari	It's because of something that one is being respected
Atchulo	Atchulo	The mighty one
Afiso	Bomine ewo afiso	Man proposes and God disposes
Allela	Allelamato	Good deeds do not go wasted
Amabaŋye	Amabaŋye	You can't open one's heart to say what's inside
Amankwa	Amankwa	—
Amate	Ebore b'agbembi matie	God's paths don't close
Amo elema	Amo elema	They make me OR that's who I am
Amoma OR Allela	Allela e-moma	Its goodness or kindness that killed me
Aso wura	Aso wura	Property owner
Ataawa	Ataawa	Female twins
Awale	Awale	Its good
Awaare	Awaare	—
Awalekiye	Awalekiye	Praise when its good
Awo n'nchɛ	Awo nchɛ ni ba nyɛnye	—
Awo n'nka nne	Awo n'nka nne	Everything is everywhere –both good and bad
Awo omoto OR Brakumu	Awo omoto OR Brakumu	Everyone has (or brings) their luck
Awoshe	Awoshe	Everything has a fault, good or bad
Awoshie	Awoshie	it's (become) cool, peaceful, under control, etc.
Badow	Badow	—
Bakoaso	Bakoaso	—
Banemu ɛyɛ	Banemu eye ne mbia nu	Elders have said and children have heard
Bangben	Bangben	They will be tired OR they'll try (but fail)
Benyepo ɛyɛ	Benyepo ɛyɛ	It is those who know you who have said (only your friend knows your secret)
Bi awur'bi	Bi awur'bi	Be careful with what u do
Bin'ka	Bi mon ka	Don't trust completely
Bonyaŋso	Bonyaŋso	Respectful
Booma	Boomaso nnana	—
Borɛ	Borɛ	Rain
Borɛ chie	Borɛ chie	—
Borɛ ena sa	Borɛ ena sa	Its God who gives
Borɛ enye	Borɛ enye	—
Borɛ enyi-enchi	Borɛ enyi-enchi	—
Borɛ esa	Borɛ esa	God's gift
Borɛ masa alowe	Ebore masa alowe	God doesn't give completely (no one is created perfect)
Borɛ walae	Borɛ walae	God is Good
Borɛ wɔ	Borɛ wɔ	God's own
Borɛ wu	Borɛ wu	God has seen
B'sha anye	B'sha anye	They like us
Chepura	Chepura	—
Daa mato	Daa mato	Character cannot be changed / thrown away
Dambatu	K ful dey se na ne anye ba to	We came to meet the moon
Dari	Dari	Twins (unisex, i.e. can be used by females or males)
Dariche	Dariche	—
Dokilebi	Dokilebi	Literally you've sown a bad seed; Figurative - you reap what you sow
Ebanyepo	Ebanyepo	—
Ebo ɛyɛ	Ebo ɛyɛ	It's the room that has said
Edonbonɛ	Edonbonɛ	What has the enemy done? (The enemy might think they are punishing you but God has blessed u already)
Edonkufo	Edonkufo	Your enemy is not far
Ekomato	E ko ma to	No one is useless
Ekone oto	Eko ne oto piye nba to fo	It's happened to someone before you
Ekoso	Eko-so ni ba nyeti e-ko	Because of someone that we have patience for another
Ekumpo	Ekumpo	The Protector
Ekunfo	Ebore ekunfo	God the Protector
Elempo	Elempo	God the Mighty / the Strong One
Esapɔ	Esapɔ	God the Giver
Esa ewɔ lanto / Esa ewoeboto	Esa ewɔ lanto / Esa ewoeboto	—
Etimpo	Ebore e-na eten awura keshekama	God is able to do everything / God is able / The Able One
Ewanyɛ	Esa nɛ nyɛ, mo e na wora	He who is blessed, much is expected
Ewale	Ebore wale	God is Good
Ewonyɛ	Ewo nye ma wo	—
Ewunio	Ewura mo nio	Chief's mother / Queen Mother
Ewuntomah	Ewura mo to mah	Chief's name sake
Ewura	Ewura	Chief
Eyri modon	Eyri modon ela kulɔ	The body's enemy is sickness; Man has no enemy except disease
Foto	Foto	Blessed
Gbeadese	Kashinteng desay ne efe la ekilti	The truth is always quite
Gyem che	Gyem che	—
Gyɛma alela	Gye maashen a le la	Talk well of me
Jinapor	Ji ne apor bomu so	Win, and overcome them
Gyeowo	Gyeowo	God's cobra aims far
Kakore	Ebore ben nkore, ban lan n'gben	God's drums; they'll drum until they get tired
Kanagboŋ	Kanagboŋ	Big family
Kanamo	Kanamo	Which family / clan?
Kananmaluwe	Kananmaluwe	The family doesn't end
Kasha	Kasha	Love
Keche e-basa	Keche e-basa	It pains to be a lady
Kenyiti	Kenyiti	Patience
Keshie eko	Men ki shie eko	I don't hate anyone
K'fantaŋ	Ebore be k'fantaŋ	God's Leaf
Kginginfra	K'gin gyan fra boɔ ebo fuloŋ	A wretched house is better than none
Koji	Bakra ko ne k'naŋ e sha fo	Be wealthy and family would like you
Kowuribi	Ko wuuri bi	small chief
Kramoase	Kramoase	—
Kurabaso	Kurabaso	—
Kurayerito	Kurayerito	Be energetic
Lempoche	Lempoche	Abled woman
Lomashie	Lowu ma shen ne ba sa be gye bo mo komo	Death doesn't allow us to enjoy ourselves
Longefiye	Longefiye	Make yours well / Mind your own business
Longesai	Longe nsa a-nye	Make it well for us
Maaman	Maaman	—
Mankpa	Mankpa	Twins (females)
Mankre	Mankre	When a woman gets pregnant before her menses (either before the first menses, or in between pregnancies)
Mantenso	Mantenso	I'll not forget
Mapoche	Mapoche	I don't boost
Masa-agben	Ebore masa agben	God doesn't tire giving
Masape	Ebore masa n k pe	God doesn't give completely (no one is created perfectly)
Matuamo	Matuamo	I wouldn't be bothered
Nefa	Nefa	Blessing
Njo amonchɛ	Njo amonchɛ	I'm waiting for that day
Nkpamafo	Nkpa ma fo ne an gye a mo	Life is not sufficient
Nndefeso	Ebore de feso	God is watching (protecting) you
Ntoba	Nn tutu ba	My father has come (reincarnation)
Obosu	Obosu	—
Okonfo	Ebore/enemu be kum fo	God protects you
Owoshie	Owoshie	Its cool, calm, peaceful, over etc.
Pumaya	Edon pu fa ya to	Your enemy is not far, they are right "under your legs"
Safo	Ebore sa fo	God has given you (God has blessed you)
Samafon	Samafon	Don't worry
Shuŋ nkpa	Shuŋ nkpa	Cry (pray) for long life
Techira	Techira	—
Titi aka	Fo bi titi e-ka	—
Yɔmba	Yɔmba	Go and come (reincarnation)
