= North Gonja (district) =

North Gonja District
- District
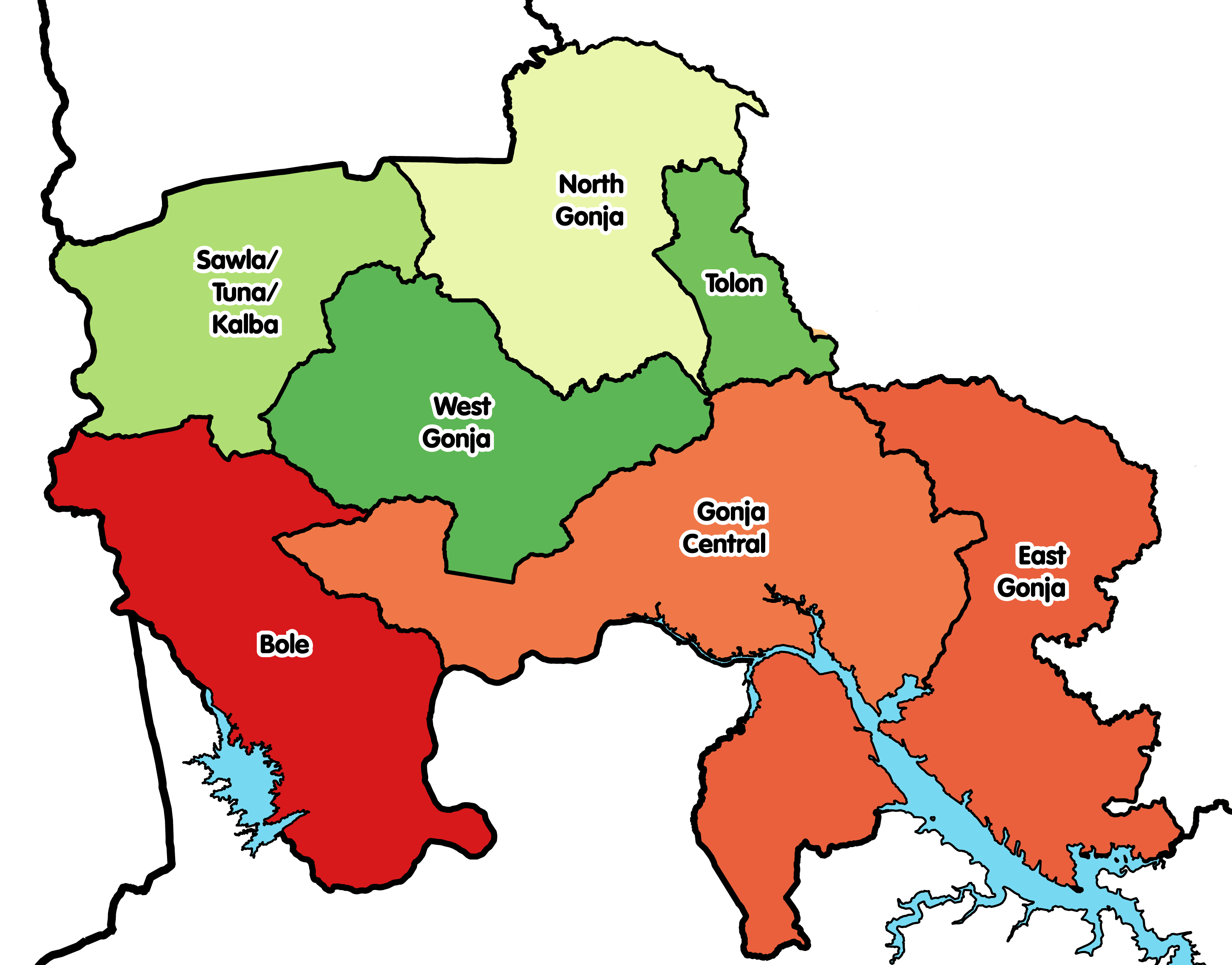
- Districts of Savannah Region

- Location of North Gonja District within Savannah
- Coordinates: 9°31′49″N 1°22′56″W
- Country: Ghana
- Region: Savannah
- Capital: Daboya

Population (2021)
  - Total: 61,432
- Time zone: UTC+0 (GMT)
- ISO 3166 code: GH-SA-NG

North Gonja District is one of the seven districts in Savannah Region, Ghana. Originally it was formerly part of the then-larger West Gonja District on 23 December 1988, until the northern part of the district was split off on 28 June 2012 to create North Gonja District; thus the remaining part has been retained as West Gonja Municipal District (which it was elevated to municipal district assembly status on 27 January 2020). The district assembly is located in the central part of Savannah Region and has Daboya as its capital town. In 2023, the District Chief Executive is Adam Illiasu.

== Population ==
According to 2021 population census, the population was 61,432.

== See also ==
- "Districts of Ghana". Statoids.
