= Central Gonja District =

- District
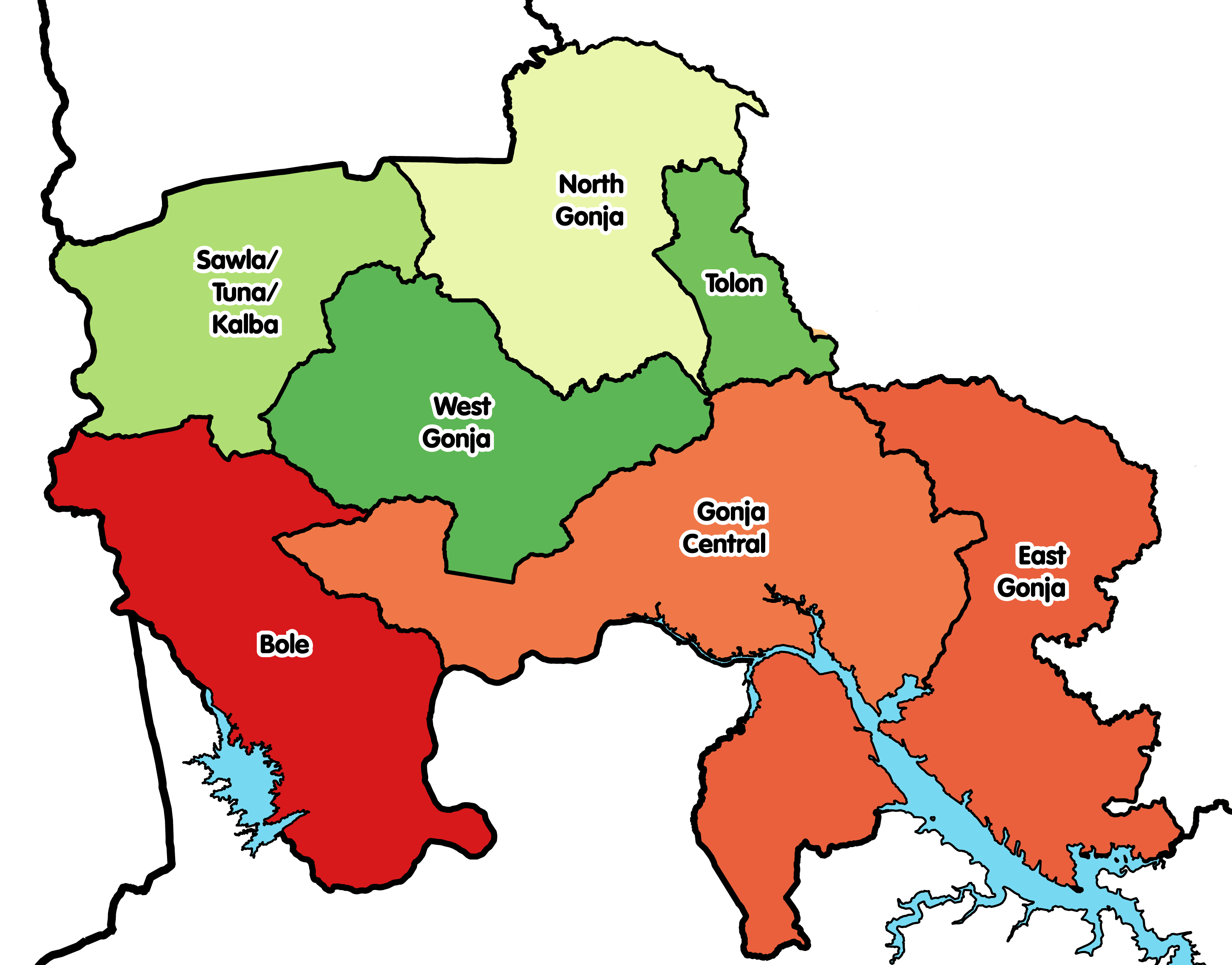
- Districts of Savannah Region

- Location of Central Gonja District within Savannah
- Coordinates: 8°47′11.76″N 1°27′54.72″W
- Country: Ghana
- Region: Savannah
- Capital: Buipe

Government
  - District Executive: Issifu Salisu Be-Awuriba

Area
  - Total: 8,353 km^{2} (3,225 sq mi)

Population (2021)
  - Total: 142,762
- Time zone: UTC+0 (GMT)
- ISO 3166 code: GH-SA-CG

Central Gonja District is one of the seven districts in Savannah Region, Ghana. The Black Volta forms the southern boundary of Central Gonja with Kintampo North District, and the White Volta flows north to south splitting the district in two. Originally it was formerly part of the then-larger West Gonja District on 23 December 1988, until the part of the district was split off by a decree of president John Agyekum Kufuor in August 2004 to create Central Gonja District; thus the remaining part has been retained as West Gonja Municipal District (which it was elevated to municipal district assembly status on 27 January 2020). The district assembly is located in the central part of Savannah Region and has Buipe as its capital town.

== See also ==
- "Districts of Ghana". Statoids.
