= Gonja people =

Ghanaian ethnic group

Gonja, Ngbanya
Regions with significant populations
- Savannah Region, Ghana

Languages
- Gonja, English

Religion
- Predominantly Islam

Related ethnic groups
- Guang people

The Gonja (also Ghanjawiyyu, endonym Ngbanya) people are a subgroup of the Guan ethnic group that live in Ghana. The Gonja established a kingdom in northern Ghana of the same name, which was founded in 1675 by Sumaila Ndewura Jakpa.

== Origin ==
The Gonja are a Guan people who have been influenced by Dagbon, Akan, Mande and Hausa people. With the fall of the Songhai Empire (c. 1600), the Mande Ngbanya clan moved south, crossing the Black Volta and founding their capital city at Yagbum under the leadership of Naba'a. The Gonja kingdom was originally divided into sections overseen by male siblings of Sumaila Ndewura Jakpa including their children and grandchildren.

== Culture ==
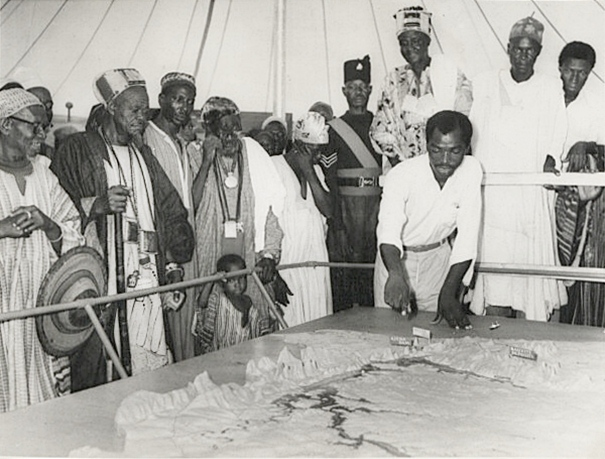
Gonja chiefs and elders at the Volta River project travelling exhibition(1950)

Precolonial Gonja society was stratified into castes, with a ruling class, a Muslim trader class, an animist commoner class, and a slave class. Its economy depended largely on trade in slaves from Central Africa and kola nuts, particularly through the market town of Salaga, sometimes called the "Timbuktu of the South."

The Gonja language, properly called Ngbanya or Ngbanyito, is a Tano language within the Kwa languages family, closely related to Akan languages.

Most Gonja are Muslims but still incorporate traditional practices and beliefs. The Gonja converted to Islam around the 18th century due to the influence of Muslim missionaries and merchants who settled in the region. Healing powers attributed to the Muslims and perceived strength of Islamic prayer encouraged conversion, together with trade.

== Notable Gonja people ==
- John Mahama (b. 1958), president of Ghana

== See also ==
- Rulers of the Northern state of Gonja
- Gonja (kingdom)
