= East Gonja Municipal District =

Municipal District in Savannah region, Ghana

- Municipal District
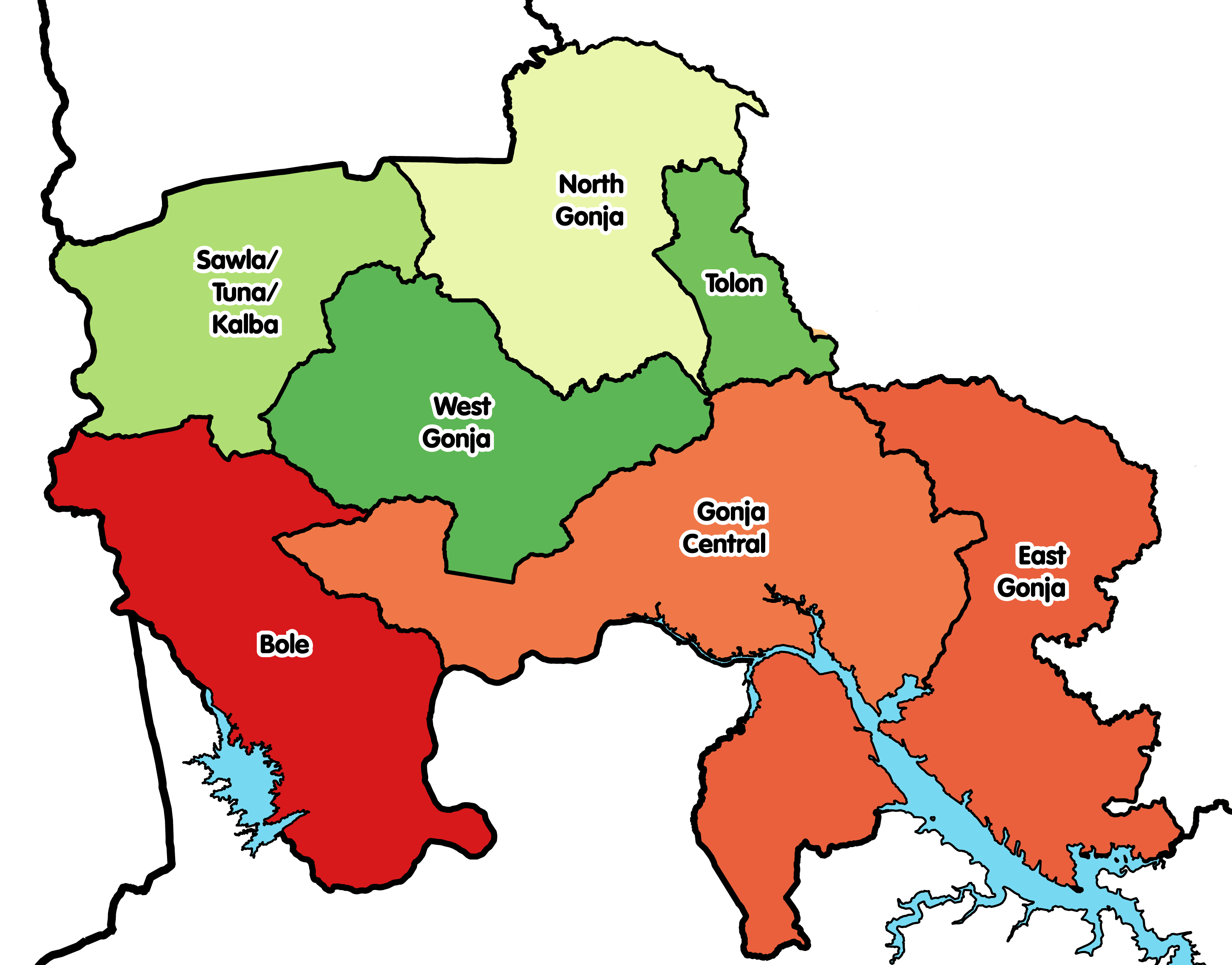
- Districts of Savannah Region

- Location of East Gonja Municipal District within Savannah
- Coordinates: 8°33′3.24″N 0°31′5.88″W
- Country: Ghana
- Region: Savannah
- Capital: Salaga

Government
  - Municipal Chief Executive: Mohammed Tamimu

Area
  - Total: 9,351 km^{2} (3,610 sq mi)

Population (2021)
  - Total: 117,755
- Time zone: UTC+0 (GMT)
- ISO 3166 code: GH-SA-EG

East Gonja Municipal Assembly is one of the seven districts in Savannah Region, Ghana. Originally created as an ordinary district assembly in 1988 when it was known as East Gonja District, until the eastern part of the district was split off by a decree of president John Agyekum Kufuor on 29 February 2008 to create Kpandai District (which is currently part of Northern Region); thus the remaining part has been retained as East Gonja District. Later, it was elevated to municipal district assembly status on 15 March 2018 to become East Gonja Municipal District. However on 19 February 2019, the northern part of the district was later split off to create North East Gonja District; thus remaining part has been retained as East Gonja Municipal District. The municipality is located in the eastern part of Savannah Region and has Salaga as its capital town.

== Population ==
The population of the Municipality stands at 117,755 according to 2021 population census

== See also ==
- "Districts of Ghana". Statoids.
