= Salaga =

- Town
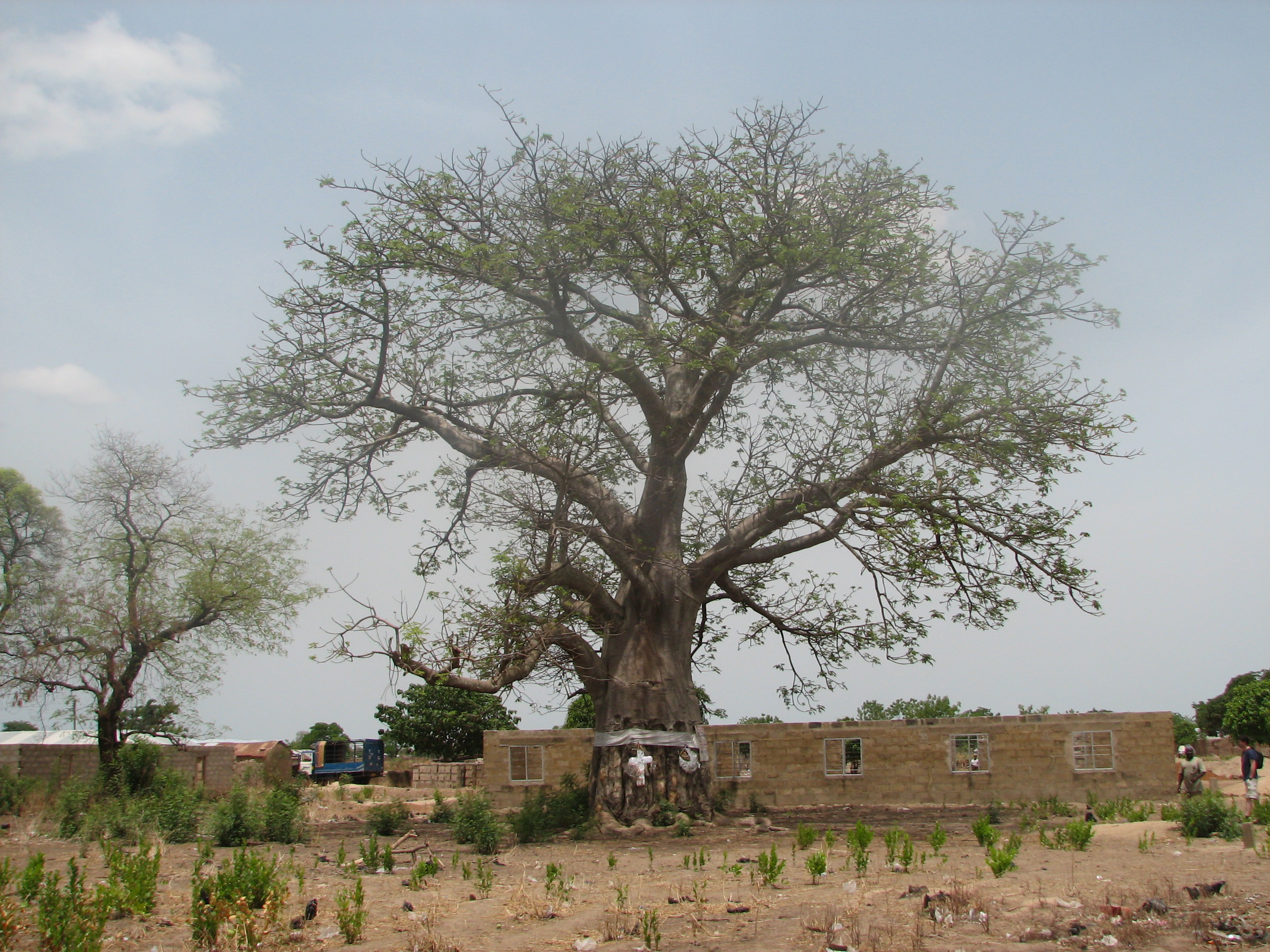
- Salaga slave tree

- Location of Salaga in Savannah Region, Ghana
- Coordinates: 8°33′N 0°31′W
- Country: Ghana
- Region: Savannah Region
- District: East Gonja District

Population (2012)
  - Total: 25,472
- Time zone: GMT
  - Summer (DST): GMT

Salaga is a town and is the capital of East Gonja district, a district in the Savannah Region of north Ghana. Salaga had a 2012 settlement population of 25,472 people. Salaga was the largest slave market in the 18th and 19th centuries.

== Etymology ==
The name Salaga comes from the Dagomba word "salgi" which means "To get used to a place of abode".

== History ==
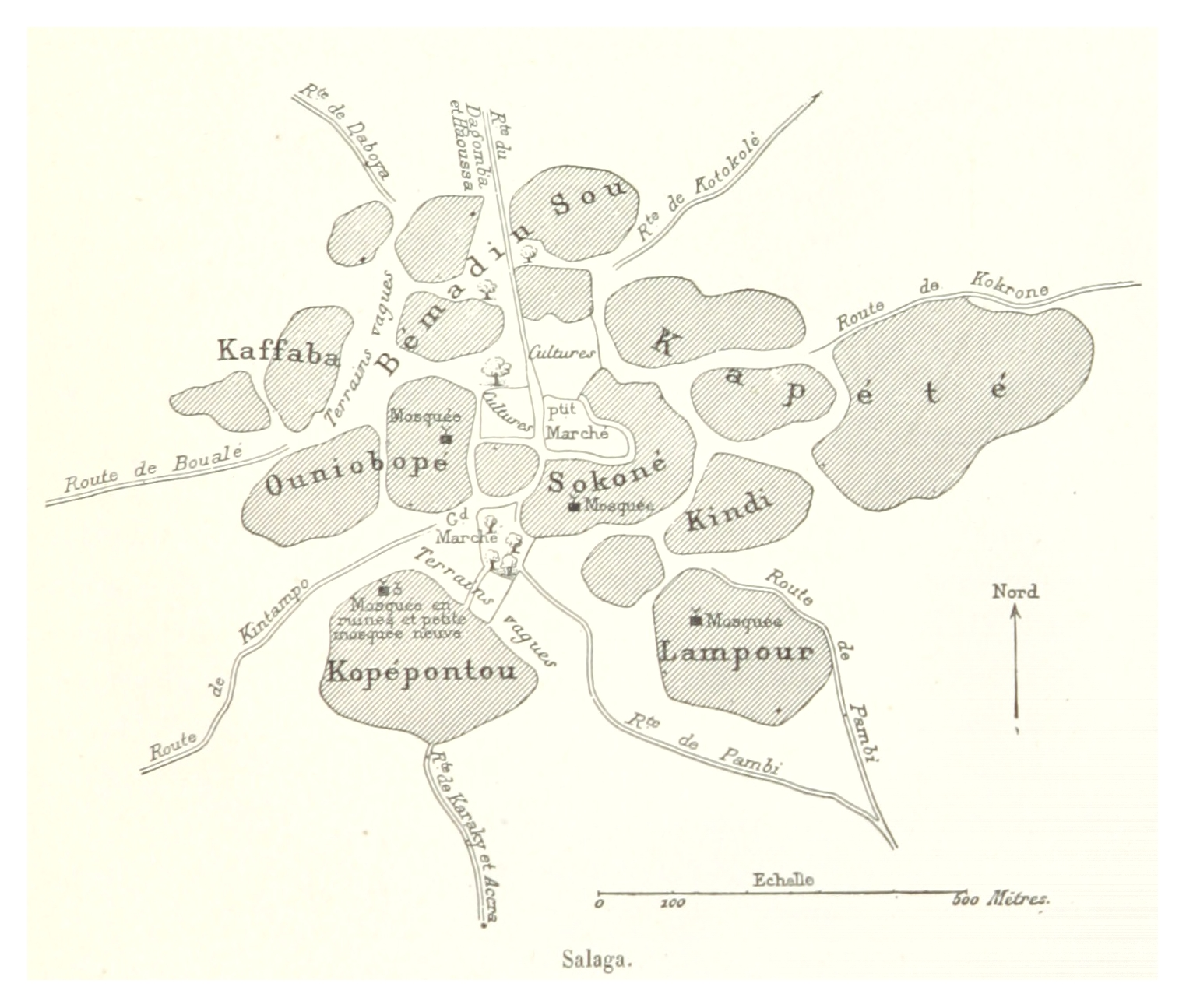
Map of Salaga, 1892

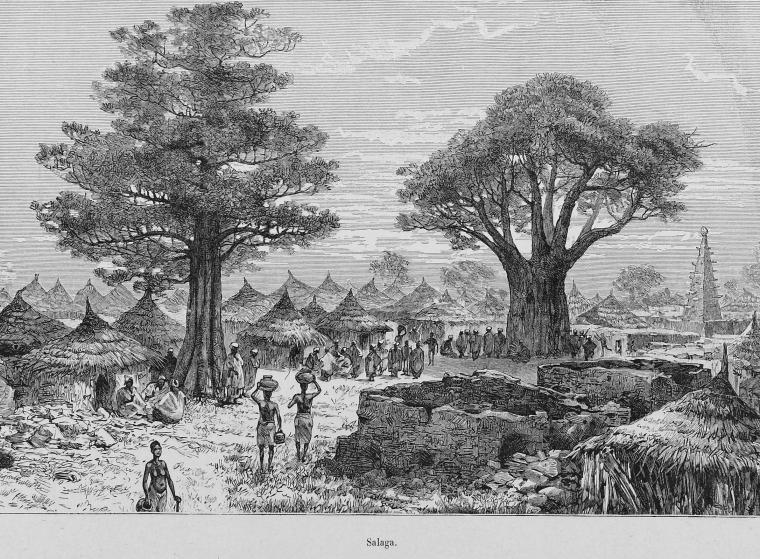
View of Salaga, with the minaret of the old mosque on the right, northern Ghana in 1892

In the eighteenth and nineteenth centuries, Salaga served as a key market town, particularly for the busy regional kola trade, and controlling Salaga gave a monopoly over trade to the north and south. After a long series of wars with the Kong Empire in the latter part of the 18th century, the Ashanti reoriented their trade away from Kong through Salaga towards the Hausa states instead.

Situated in the southernmost reaches of the Sahel, Salaga was referred to as "the Timbuktu of the south" for its cosmopolitan population and varied trade. Gonja, a powerful warrior kingdom, ruled Salaga and several other towns. However, being a cosmopolitan town, Salaga was inhabited by Hausas, Wangaras, Dagombas, Gurmas, and other groups from the region as well as the indigenous Gonja.

Salaga was central to the emergence of the Zabarima (emirate) as a power in the area that is now northern Ghana, when the scholar Alfa Hano and the warrior Gazari migrated here from their former homes south-east of Niamey in the 1860s.

The Salaga market served as a transit point through the northern Sahel and the southernmost coast of the 'Sahel', as well as through the Dagomba towns of Kpabia and Yendi. This gave rise to the transport of cattle and groundnuts from Yendi via the Salaga market. It also was the transit point through which kola was transported from modern day Ghana to northern Nigeria. During the Trans-Atlantic slave trade, Salaga also served as an important market from where slaves were transported to the coast for export. In Salaga, there is a pond named "Wonkan bawa," which is a Huasa phrase that means "the bathing spot of slaves." There is also a young Baobab tree in the area that was formerly the Slave Market. This is why a market in Jamestown is called the "Salaga Market": slaves originally shipped from the Salaga slave market were sold there.

In 1892, civil war broke out in Salaga, resulting in a mass exodus of mostly Zongo peoples out of the area.

== Education ==
The town is served by Salaga Senior High School, established in 1976. The school is a mixed day and boarding school offering programmes in agriculture, business, home economics, visual arts, general arts and general science.

== Notable people ==
- Abdul-Yakuni Iddi
