= Savannah Region =

Region of Ghana

Coordinates: 9°05′N 1°49′W

- Region
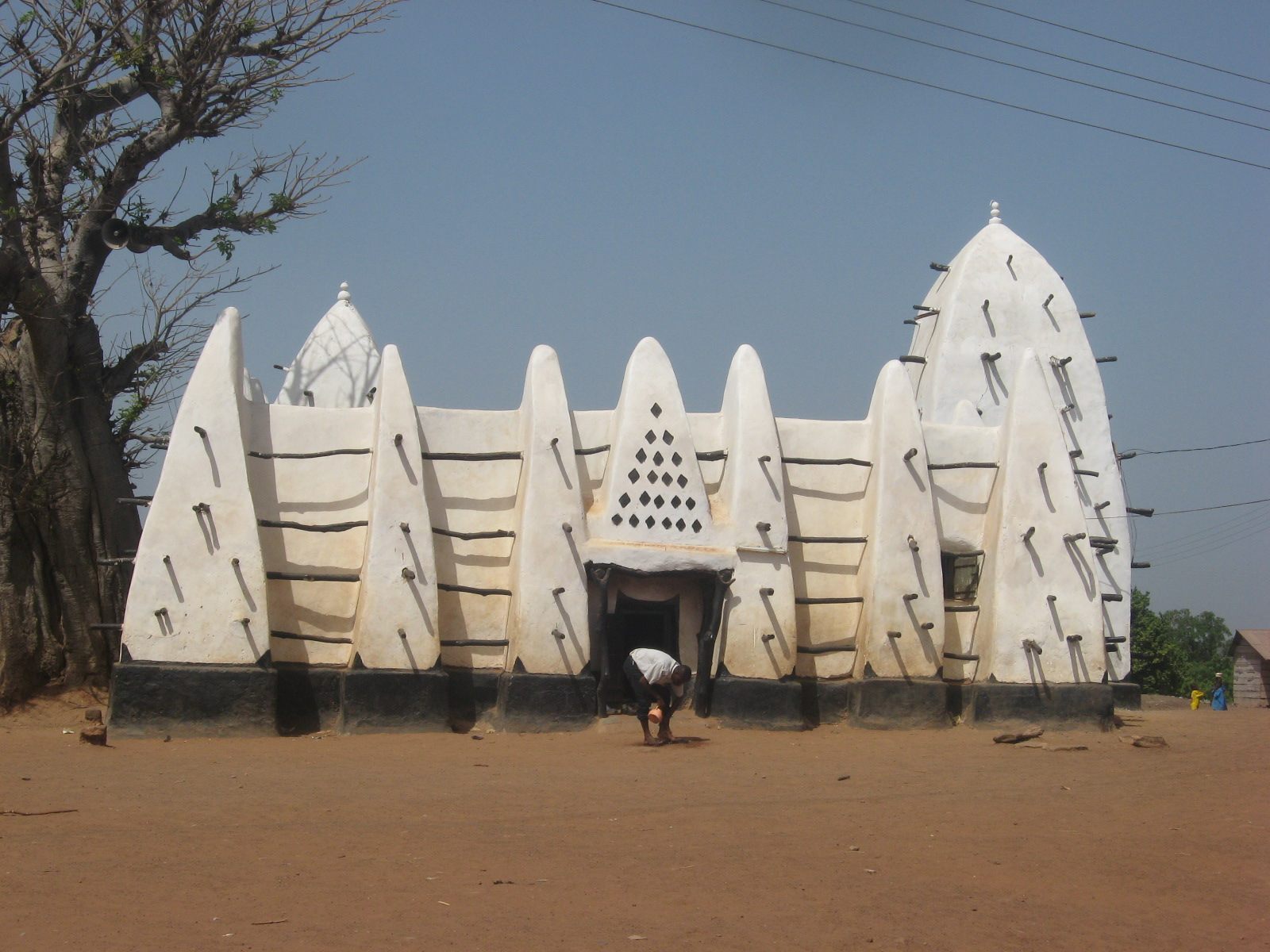
- Larabanga Mosque, one of the oldest mosques in West Africa

- Location of Savannah Region in Ghana
- Country: Ghana
- Established: 27 December 2018
- Capital: Damongo
- Districts: 6

Government
  - Regional Minister: Salisu Be-Awuribe

Area
  - Total: 34,790 km^{2} (13,430 sq mi)

Population (2021 Census)
  - Total: 653,266
  - Density: 18/km^{2} (47/sq mi)
- Time zone: GMT
- Area code: 037
- ISO 3166 code: GH-SV

The Savannah Region is one of the newest regions of Ghana and the largest region in the country. The creation of the Region follows presentation of a petition by the Gonja Traditional Council, led by the Yagbongwura Tumtumba Boresa Jakpa I. Upon receiving favourable responses from all stakeholders in the Northern Region (the region it was broken off from), the Brobbey Commission (the Commission tasked with the creation of the new regions), a referendum was conducted on the 27th December 2018. The result was a resounding yes of 99.7%. The President of the Republic of Ghana signed and presented the Constitutional Instrument (CI) 115 to the Yagbonwura in the Jubilee House, Accra on 12 February 2019. The launch was well attended by sons and daughters of Gonjaland including all current and past Mps, MDCEs and all appointees with Gonjaland descent. Damongo was declared the capital of the new Savannah Region. It is located in the north of the country. The Savannah Region is divided into 7 districts; Bole, Central Gonja, North Gonja, East Gonja, Sawla/Tuna/Kalba, West Gonja, North East Gonja and 7 Constituencies; Bole/Bamboi, Damongo, Daboya/Mankarigu, Salaga North, Salaga South, Sawla/Tuna/Kalba and Yapei/Kusawgu. The capital of Bole district is Bole; East Gonja municipal is Salaga; West Gonja district is Damango; Sawla Tuna Kalba district is Salwa; Central Gonja is Buipe; North Gonja is Daboya; and North East Gonja is Kpalbe

== History ==
Prior to the 2016 Ghanaian general election, the then candidate Nana Akufo-Addo declared that when elected, he would explore the possibility of creating new regions out of some of the existing regions in Ghana in order to bring government closer to citizens.

The execution of plans for the creation of the regions was seeded to the newly created Ministry of Regional Reorganization and Development which is under the leadership of Hon. Dan Botwe. Government of Ghana ministry charged with the responsibility of supervising the creation of new regions in Ghana. In March 2017, the ministry sent the blue print for the creation of the region along with others to the Council of State. The council met over 36 times from the time of submission to August 2017.

The final stage for the creation of the region will be decided through a referendum by the people within the catchment of the new region.

A referendum on 27 December 2018 approved the creation of Savannah Region, with 206,350 (99.52%) votes in favour on a turnout of 81.77%. CI 115 establishing the Region signed and presented on 12 February 2019.

== Geography and climate ==
=== Location and size ===
The Savannah Region is bordered on the north by the Upper West region, on the west by the Ghana-Côte d'Ivoire international border, on the south by the Bono and Bono East regions, and on the west by the North East and Northern regions. Savannah region is made up of 7 districts.

== Health facilities ==
- West Gonja Hospital
- St. Anne's Catholic Hospital
- Salaga District Hospital
- Bole District Hospital
- Sawla-Tuna Kalbe District Hospital
- Central Gonja District Hospital

== Climate and vegetation ==
The Savannah Region is much drier than southern areas of Ghana, due to its proximity to the Sahel, and the Sahara. The vegetation consists predominantly of grassland, especially savanna with clusters of drought-resistant trees such as baobabs or acacias. Between December and April is the dry season. The wet season is between about July and November with an average annual rainfall of 750 to 1050 mm (30 to 40 inches). The highest temperatures are reached at the end of the dry season, the lowest in December and January. However, the hot Harmattan wind from the Sahara blows frequently between December and the beginning of February. The temperatures can vary between 14 °C (59 °F) at night and 40 °C (104 °F) during the day.

== Tourism & Parks ==
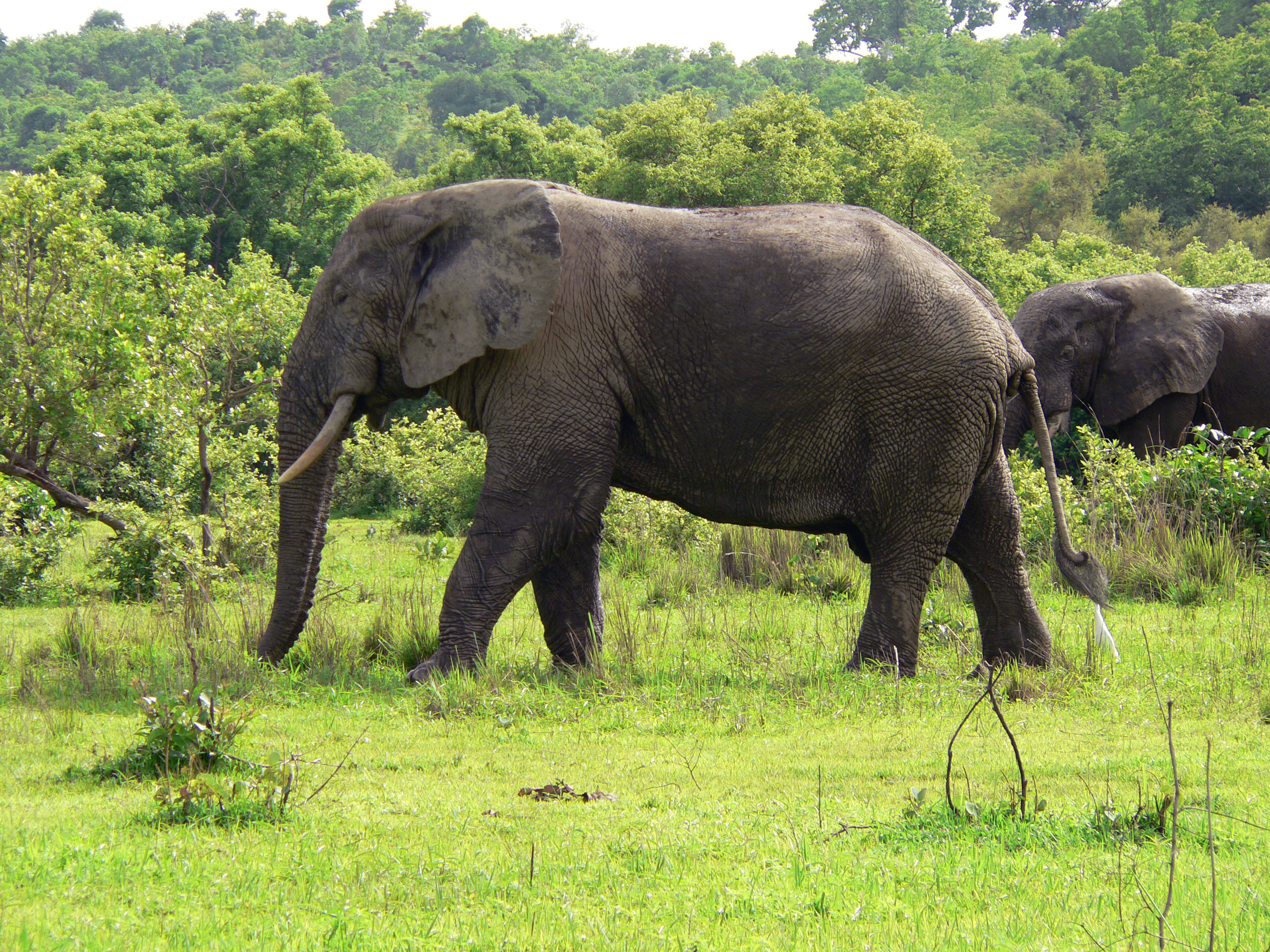
Elephants at Mole National Park

- Mole National Park
- Salaga slave market and wells
- Bui National Park (now defunct due to Bui National Dam)
- Larabanga Historic Mosque
- Wechiau Hippo Sanctuary

== Business and Investment ==
It is one of the main grain and tuber producing areas in Ghana. Harnessing these particularly will help to create employment and reduce poverty. The Region has about 2.69 million hectares of land under cropping and livestock rearing.

It has unique climatic and soil characteristic making the area ideal for growing of pineapples (number one non- traditional export crop in Ghana), yams (second most important non-traditional export crop) cassava and maize.

== Demographics ==
The Savannah Region has a low population density, and along with the official language of English, most inhabitants speak a language of the Central Gur subfamily in the Niger–Congo language family, such as Vagla, Dagbani, Mamprusi or Tampulma, or the Potou-Tano language Gonja.

== Economy ==
=== Religion ===
A majority of residents in the Savanna Region identify as Muslim.

== Educational institutions ==
- Bole Senior High School
- Buipe Senior High School
- Damongo Senior High School
- Salaga Senior High School
- Salaga T.I Ahmediyya senior high school
- Sawla Senior High School
- Daboya Community Day Senior High School
- Kpembe Nurses and midwifery college
- Damongo Health Assistant college

== Administrative divisions ==
The political administration of the region is through the local government system. Under this administration system, the region is divided into seven MMDA's (made up of 0 Metropolitan, 2 Municipal and 5 Ordinary Assemblies). Each District, Municipal or Metropolitan Assembly, is administered by a Chief Executive, representing the central government but deriving authority from an Assembly headed by a presiding member elected from among the members themselves. The current list is as follows:

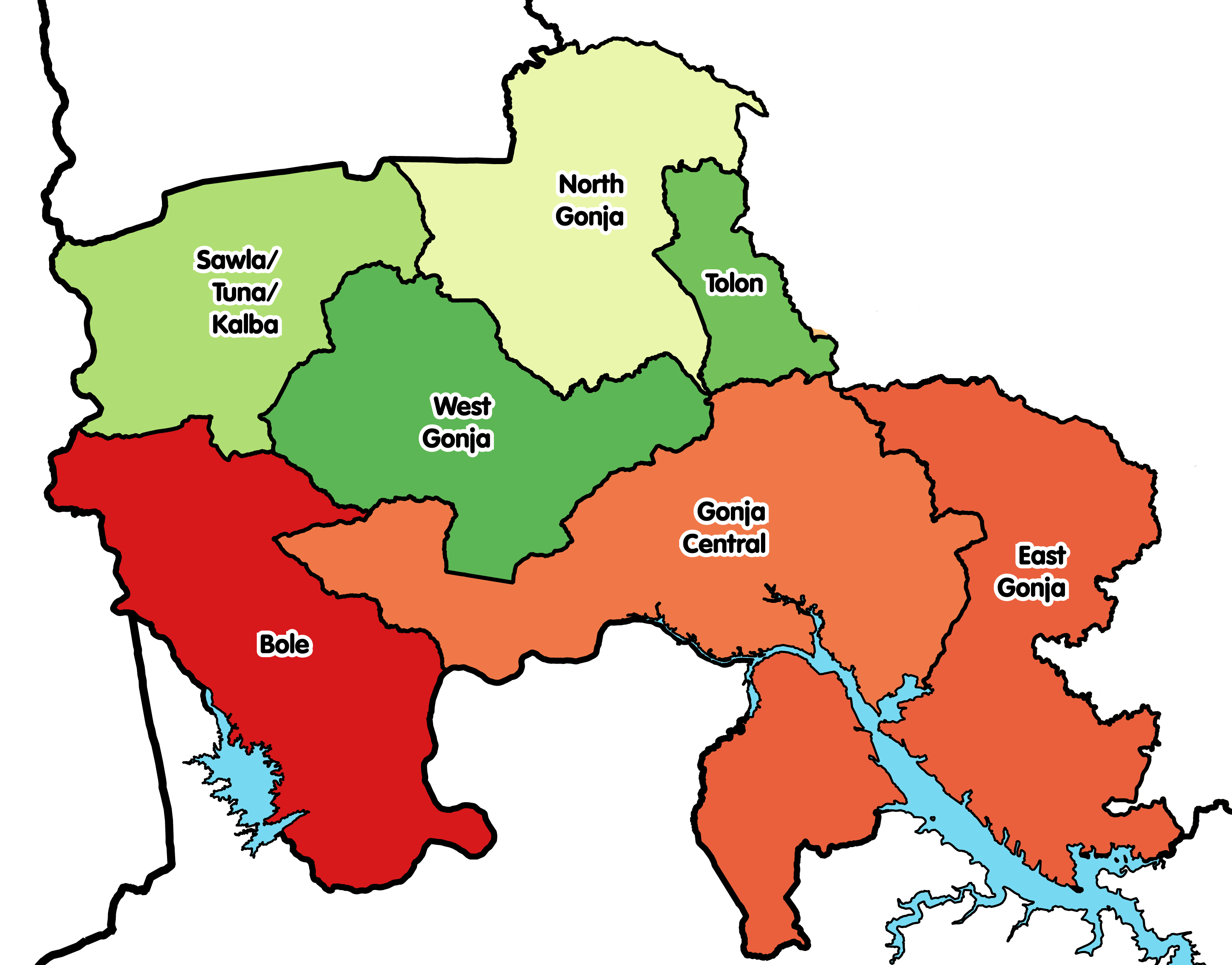
Districts of the Savannah Region

Districts of the Savannah Region
#	MMDA Name	Capital	MMDA Type
1	Bole	Bole	Ordinary
2	Central Gonja	Buipe	Ordinary
3	North Gonja	Daboya	Ordinary
4	East Gonja	Salaga	Municipal
5	North East Gonja	Kpalbe	Ordinary
6	Sawla-Tuna-Kalba	Sawla	Ordinary
7	West Gonja	Damongo	Municipal

== Famous citizens ==
Famous native citizens of Savannah region
#	Citizen	Settlement
1	John Dramani Mahama	Bole
2	Lepowura M.N.D Jawula	Salaga
3	Ibrahim Mahama	Bole
