= Railway stations in Ghana =

Railway network of Ghana

The railway stations in Ghana serve a rail network concentrated in the south of the country.

== Maps ==
- UNHCR Atlas Map Ghana – shows Topography.
- UN Map Ghana – shows Provinces
- GhanaNet Map

== Towns served by rail ==
=== Existing ===
The following towns or villages currently have or had rail service in Ghana; 1,067 mm (3 ft 6 in) gauge unless otherwise noted :

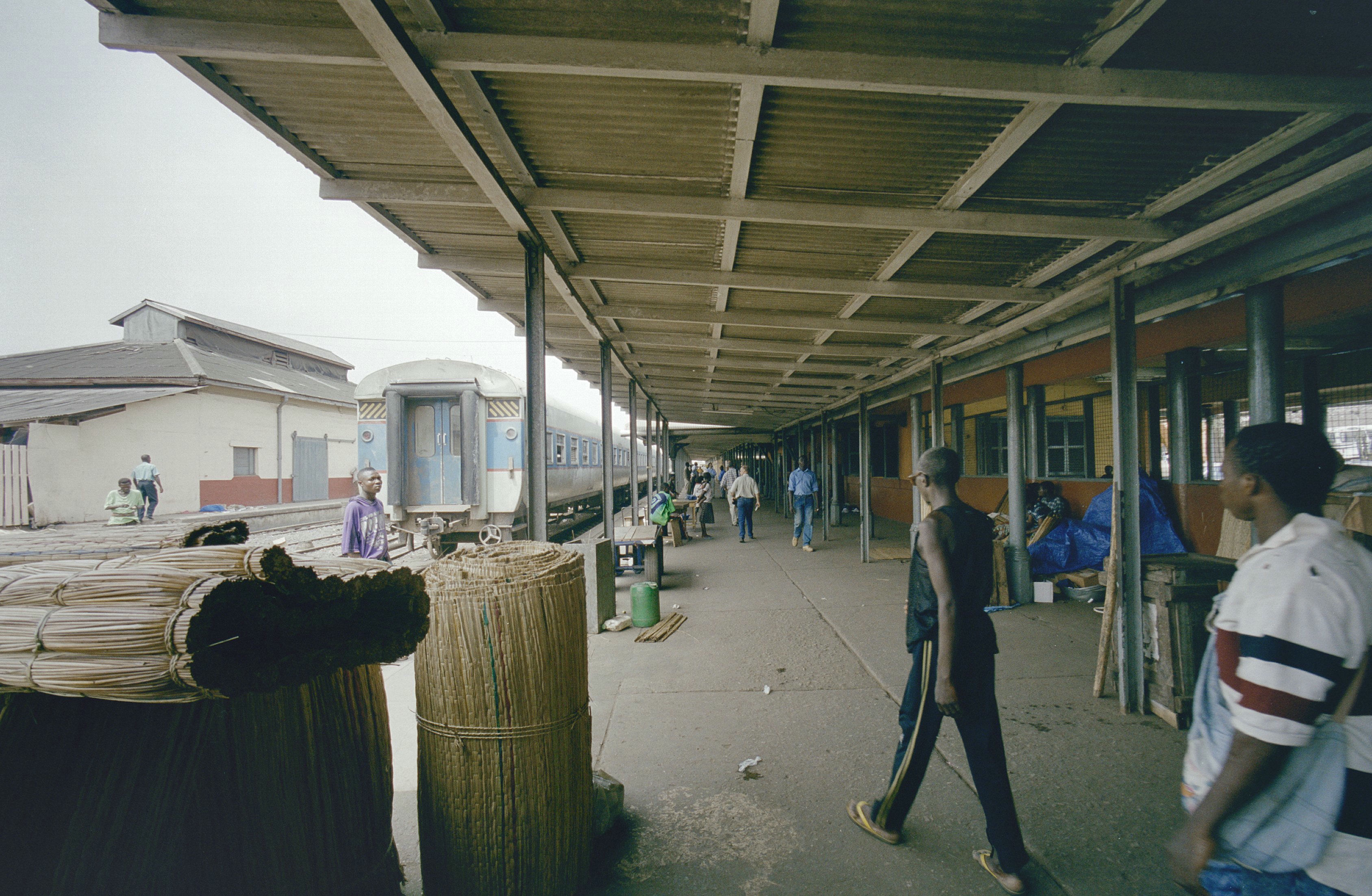
Accra station platforms and canopy.

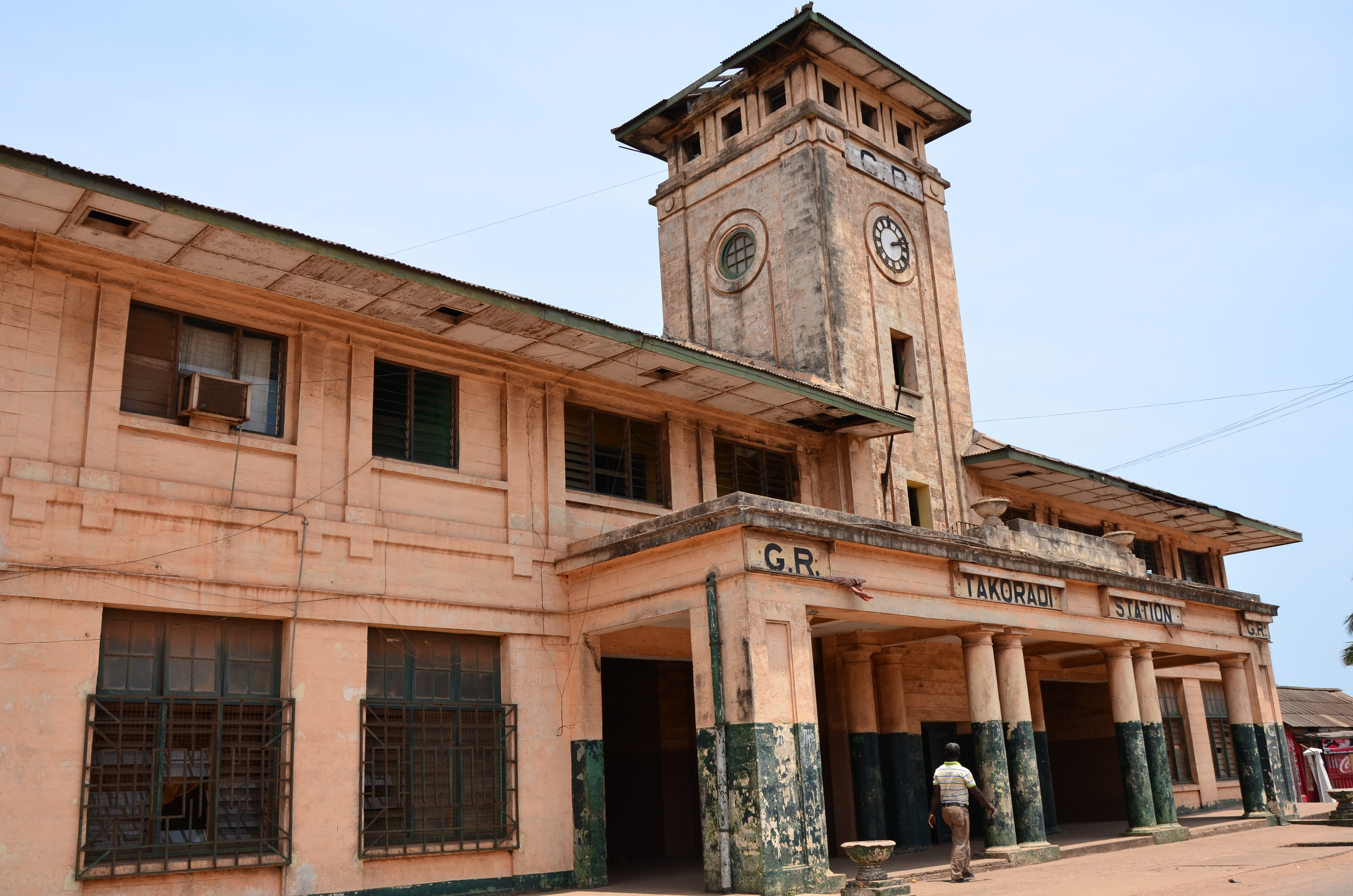
Takoradi Railway Station.

==== East ====
- Accra – (E) – port, capital city: Accra Central Station
- Baatsona
- Asoprochona – suburban terminus
- Koforidua (E)
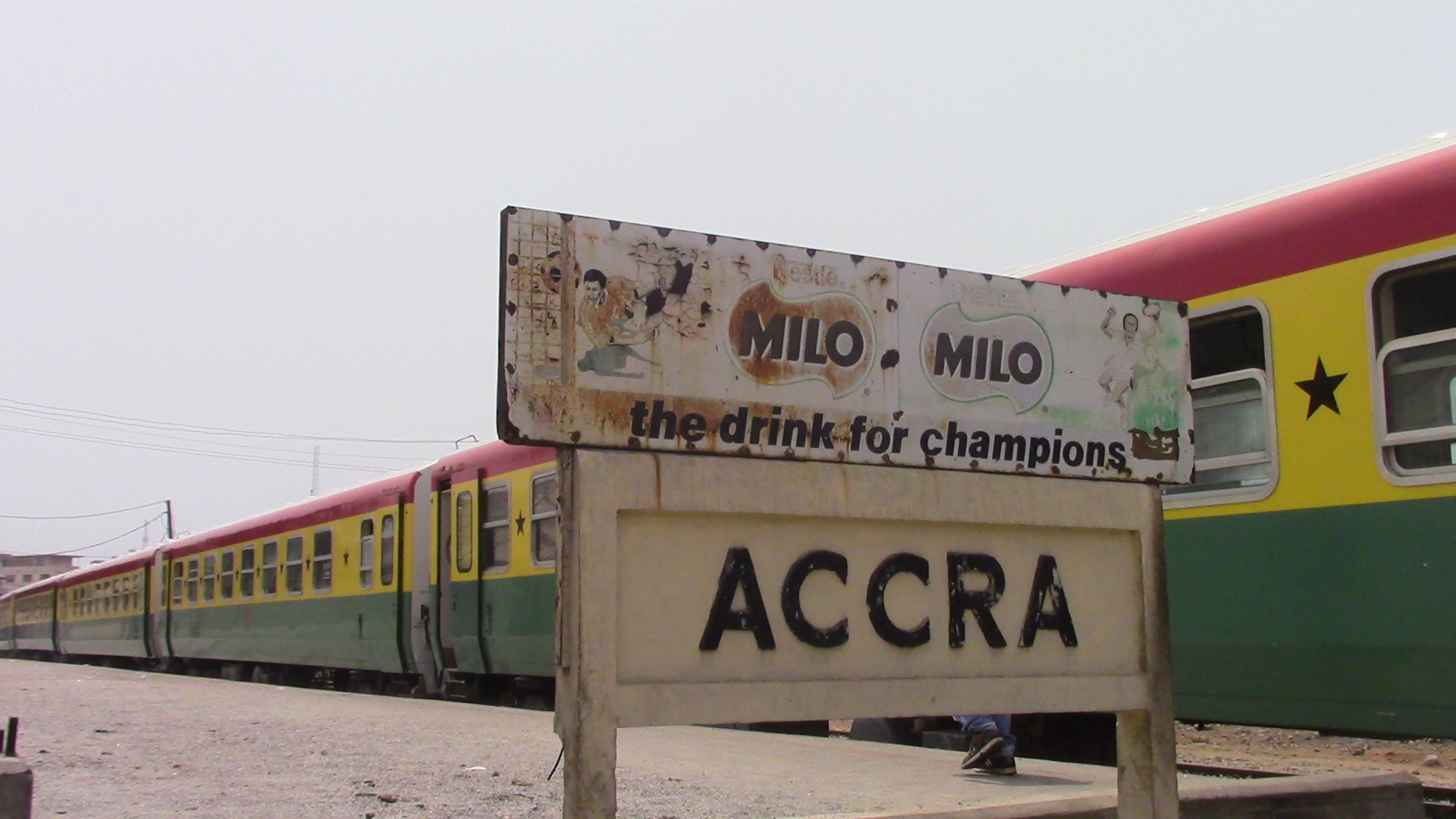
  Accra sign post
- Pokoasi – (E/C) – junction
  - Shai Hills – (E)
- Tema – (E) – port in east – proposed suburban terminus 2008

- Nsawam – (E)
- Koforidua (E)
- Nkawkaw – (E)
- Ejisu – (E)
- Nsuta
- Juaso (C)
- Konongo, Ghana (E)
- Boankra (E) – inland port
- Kumasi (E/W) – junction

- Nsuta (E)
- Bososo (E)

- Anyinam

==== West ====
Railway in the western part of Ghana is formalised by the Western Railway Line and has stations passing through the following towns.

- Sekondi - (W) - older port and workshops
- Tarkwa – (W) – junction
- Takoradi – (W) – newer port
- Huni Valley – (W/C) – junction on west line for cross country line to east line; concrete sleeper plant
- Dunkwa – (W) – Junction for Awaso
- Obuasi – (W) 85.5 km
- Bekwai – (W)
- Kumasi – (W/E) junction 0.0 km

  - Tarkwa – (W) – junction
  - Prestea – branch terminus – (W)

  - Dunkwa – (W) – Junction for Awaso
  - Awaso – (W) – branch terminus – Bauxite mine

==== Centre ====
- Huni Valley – (W/C) – junction
- Twifu Praso
- Foso (C)
- Achissi – (C) – junction
  - Akim Oda – (C) –
  - Kade – (C) – branch terminus (o/o/u)
- Akoroso (C)
- Pokoasi
- Kotoku – (E/C) – junction

==== Eastern Border ====
- 1,000 mm (3 ft 3 3/8 in) gauge
- Lomé – Togo
- (Togo) (Ghana) – border
- Aflao – Diamond Cement Ghana Limited factory at Aflao to the Lomé Port is expected to be completed in early 2014.

=== Proposed ===
This list includes regauged stations.

==== Far Northern Line (West) ====
(far western line)

- (Ghana) Takoradi – port – break of gauge 1,067 mm (3 ft 6 in)/1,435 mm (4 ft 8 1/2 in)
- (Ghana) (Ghana) Manso
- (Ghana) Tarkwa – junction for northwest
- (Ghana) Huni Valley
- (Ghana) Dunkwa
  - (Ghana) Awaso
- (Ghana) Nyinahim
- (Ghana) Sunyani (regional capital Brong-Ahafo)
- (Ghana) Techiman – junction
- (Ghana) Bole
- (Ghana) Salwa
- (Ghana) Wa (regional capital Upper West Region)
- (Ghana) Hamile – northwest terminus – 1,435 mm (4 ft 8 1/2 in)
  - Border (Ghana) - (Burkina Faso)
- Burkina Faso
- (Burkina Faso) Ouagadougou – junction

==== Far Northern Line (East) ====
1,435 mm (4 ft 8 1/2 in) under construction 2020

- (Ghana) Tema – Port
- (Ghana) Mpakadan
- (Ghana) Kpeve
- (Ghana) Hohoe
- (Ghana) Jasikan
- (Ghana) Bimbila
- (Ghana) Yendi
- (Ghana) Tamale (regional capital Northern Region)
- (Ghana) Walewale
- (Ghana) Bolgatanga (regional capital Upper East Region)
- (Ghana) Navrongo
- (Ghana) Paga
- (Ghana) Akosombo
- (Ghana) Ho (regional capital Volta Region)
- (Ghana) Hohoe
- (Ghana) Paga (0 km)
- - – Border (Ghana-Burkina Faso)
- (Burkina Faso) Po
- (Burkina Faso) Dakola
- (Burkina Faso) Zabre
- (Burkina Faso) Tenkodogo
- (Burkina Faso) Manga
- (Burkina Faso) Bagre
- (Burkina Faso) Ouagadougou – junction – national capital (166 km) (1000 km from Tema)

- Nsuta

- (Suburban)
- (Ghana) Dansoman
- La, Ghana
- Teshie, Ghana

==== ECOWAS Coastal Line ====
- (proposed 2010)
- Aflao – near border in east with Togo, and capital Lomé.
- Togo-Ghana border
- (Ghana) Tema
- (Ghana) Accra – national capital
- (Ghana) Winneba
- Cape Coast (regional capital Central Region, Ghana)
- Takoradi (regional capital Western Region, Ghana)
- (Ghana) Omanpe
- (Ivory Coast) Ghana-Côte d'Ivoire border

=== Approved ===
- Kumasi – (W/E) junction (2010)
- Bolgatanga
- Navrongo
- Paga – near Burkina Faso

- Takoradi
- Manso
- Huni Valley
- Tarkwa
- Dunkwa–Awaso
- Nyinahin
- Sunyani
- Techiman
- Bole
- Salwa
- Wa
- Hamile

(far eastern line)

- Ejisu
- Mampong
- Nkoranza
- Tamale – junction
- Bolgatanga
- Paga – near Burkina Faso
- Tamale
- Yendi
- Shieni – iron ore
  - Buipe – just north of lake
  - Lake Volta

=== Suburban ===
(Suburban line)

- Accra
- Sakumono
- Asoprochona
- Tema – large port to east of Accra
- Kasoa
- Winneba - west of Accra on coast.
- Madina

Lake Volta branch to east:

- Achimota (E) - junction
- Tema (E) – major port
- Sugbaniate (E)
- Shai Hills (E)
- Akosombo (E) – inland lake port

=== Rehab 2008 ===
- Kumasi to Paga
- Yendi branch.
- Takoradi through Kumasi
- Awaso branch

- Bosusi
- Kibi – bauxite deposit

- Baatsonaa and Nungua bridge repairs complete

=== Other ===
- Kumasi, Boankra inland port, Kumasi-Paga through Buipe, to connect the Volta lake, Achimota-Tema port, Tamale-Yendi to connect Shieni (227m) iron deposit, Bosusi-Kibi to connect the bauxite deposit at Kibi and branch lines linking the towns where other mineral deposits have been identified.
- Takoradi through Manso, Tarkwa, Huni Valley, Dunkwa Awaso, Nyinahin, Sunyani, Techiman, Bole, Sawla, Wa through to Hamile in the Upper West Region of Ghana.
- Ghana Railway Development Authority has invited bids to convert the 950 km rail network from 1,067 mm (3 ft 6 in) narrow gauge to standard gauge, permitting 25 tonne axleloads and increasing speeds from 56 to 160 km/h. In the longer term, feasibility studies will look at introducing a suburban rail service from Accra to Kasoa, Winneba and Madina, as well as extending the railway to the north and connecting with the proposed Ecowas rail line across West Africa.

=== Closed ===
- Kade

== Timeline ==
=== 2020 ===
- 83.5 km
- Kumasi-Paja design
- Accra-Kumasi

=== 2019 ===
- Ghana – Burkino Faso
- Western line

=== 201? ===
- Accra
- Avenor, Ghana

- Nsawam
- Kumasi

- Ejisu
- Tamale
- Paga

- Yendi

=== 2010 ===
- Ghana proposes part of the ECOWAS Coastal Railway linking Aflao-Tema-Accra, Winneba, Cape Coast, Takoradi and Omape.
- The Government of Ghana and the China National Machinery Import and Export Corporation (CMC) has signed a US$6.050 billion contract agreement for the construction of a railway infrastructure from Nsawam near Accra via Kumasi to Paga on the Burkina Faso border, and a branch from same at Tamale to Yendi.

=== 2009 ===
- Ghana Railway Development Authority invites bids to convert the 950 km network to standard gauge
- Ghana plans major rail rehabilitation

== Standards ==
- Couplings : AAR
- Brakes : Air

== See also ==
- Rail transport in Ghana
- Rail transport in Burkina Faso
- Transport in Ghana
- Ghana Railway Corporation
- Ghana
- List of countries by rail transport network size
- Railway stations in Togo
- ECOWAS rail
