= Boankra =

- City
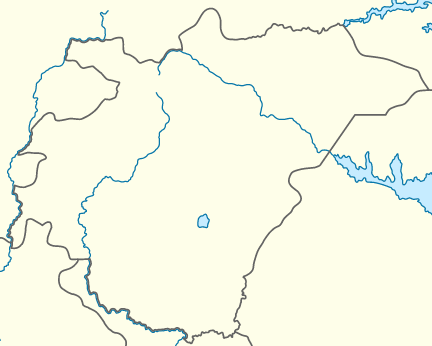
- Location within Ashanti Location within Ghana Location within Africa
- Coordinates: 06°41′40″N 1°24′10″W
- Country: Ghana
- Municipality: Boankra Metropolitan

Government
  - Type: Mayor–council
- Time zone: UTC

Boankra is a town in south-central Ghana.

== Transport ==
It is served by a station on the eastern network of Ghana Railways.

The proposed Boankra Inland Port is to be situated at this site linking the ports of Tema and Takoradi to the inner parts of the country and the landlocked countries of Burkina Faso, Mali and Niger.

== See also ==
- Railway stations in Ghana
