= Manso Wassa =

- Town
- Location in Ghana
- Coordinates: 05°05′15″N 01°50′18″W
- Country: Ghana
- Region: Western Region
- District: District
- Elevation: 190 ft (58 m)
- Time zone: GMT
  - Summer (DST): GMT

Manso Wassa is a small town located about 30 km from the port city of Takoradi, in the Western Region of Ghana. It is the second largest town in the Mpohor district.

== Namesake ==
There are a number of villages in Ghana sharing the same name, including Bono Manso.

== Transport ==
Manso lies on the western network of the Ghana Railway Corporation and is at the end of double track from Takoradi.

== See also ==
- Transport in Ghana
- Railway stations in Ghana
