= Minerals and Mining Law, 1986 =

The Minerals and Mining Law, 1986 (PNDCL 153), as amended by the Minerals and Mining (Amendment) Act, 1994 (Act 475) and the Minerals and Mining Act, 2006 (Act 703), regulates mining in Ghana.

Under the Minerals and Mining Law, mining companies must pay royalties; companies may also pay corporate taxes at standard rates. Companies are exempt from custom duties on accessories, equipment, machinery, and plants used for mining operations, but must pay local property taxes on their immovable properties. The 1986 mining law had been instrumental in attracting more than $5 billion in foreign investment to the Ghanaian mining industry between 1986 and 2002. The 1994 amendments reduced the 45% general mining corporate tax rate to 35%, which is the same as that imposed on other industries.

On December 15, 2005, the Ghanaian Parliament passed into law a new minerals and mining bill. Some of the provisions under the new Minerals and Mining Act, 2006 (Act 703) included access to mineral rights on a first-come, first-considered basis; a specific timeframe within which all applications are expected to be granted; the right for applicants to demand written reasons from the Minister if an application is rejected; the government's right to acquire land or authorize its occupation and use if the land is required for mining purposes; the establishment of a cadastral system for the administration of mineral rights; a provision establishing the range of royalty rates, which is not to be less than 3% or exceed 6% of total mining revenues; the Government’s right to obtain a 10% free-carried interest in mining leases; and the establishment of the period of duration of a mining lease, which is not to exceed 30 years and which may be renewed once for a period not to exceed an additional 30 years.
