= Bauxite mining in Ghana =

Bauxite mining in Ghana produced about 708,000 metric tonnes of bauxite in 2021.

== Uses ==
Bauxite is Ghana's primary ore for aluminium production, and plays a role in the country's industrial sector. Most of the bauxite mined in Ghana is used for the production of alumina, which is then refined into aluminium.

== History ==
The history of bauxite mining in Ghana dates back to the early 20th century. Bauxite was first discovered in the country in 1921 at Awaso, in the Western North Region. The first operations began in the 1940s, with the Ghana Bauxite Company (GBC) managing the extraction and export of bauxite since then.

In 2018 the Ghana Integrated Aluminium Development Corporation (GIADEC) was established by an Act of parliament, under the Ghana Integrated Aluminium Development Corporation Act, 2018 (Act 976). This law was passed to oversee and implement the government's vision of developing an integrated aluminium industry in Ghana, with the aim of transforming the bauxite sector into a fully integrated value chain, including mining, refining, and manufacturing of aluminium products.

== Deposits ==
=== Awaso ===
Awaso is in the Western-North Region and is one of Ghana's oldest mining areas, with reserves estimated at 60 million metric tons (MMT). The mine has primarily supported raw material exports for decades.

=== Nyinahin ===
The Ashanti Region's Nyinahin holds Ghana's largest bauxite reserves, with an estimated 700 MMT.

=== Kyebi ===
Kyebi, in the Eastern Region, contains about 160 MMT of reserves and is slated for future development.
