= Huni Valley =

- Town
- Location within Ghana
- Coordinates: 05°28′14″N 01°55′01″W
- Country: Ghana
- Region: Western Region
- District: Prestea-Huni Valley District
- Time zone: GMT
  - Summer (DST): GMT

Huni Valley, formerly known as Tinkwakrom, is a town in the Prestea-Huni Valley District of the Western Region in west central Ghana. It is one of the Wassa towns and a divisional arm of the Wassa Fiase Kingdom. The Bosomtwi Division spans from Abosso to Koduakrom. Wassa Damang, Amoanda, Bompieso, Enimil Krom, Kyekyewere, and 4 Miles are all towns under the jurisdiction of the Bosomtwi divisional traditional Kingdom.

It is notable for being one of the most mysterious towns in Ghana, with no dogs in the whole area. It is believed that the earliest inhabitants in the area had to ban dogs because they were too dangerous, and the gods were angry that the dogs were killing their people.

Huni Valley and Kotoku were the only two main junctions in the Ghana Railroad Company. The Huni Valley terminal connected the Western Central and Eastern corridors of Ghana.

Recent traditional leaders include Nana Agyakwaw III, Nana Enimil Kuma IV, and Nana Kwabena Amponsah IV.

In 2020/21, the Huni Valley Cocoa district was the highest cocoa-producing district in Ghana.

Huni Valley is one of the main catchment communities in the Goldfields Ghana’s Damang mine operational area. It has about four mining pits. In recent times, the youth have demonstrated for employment opportunities being given out to out-of-area residents. Most youth blame traditional leaders and the employment committee members for selling slots. On several occasions, the youth have recommended that the mine give all employment slots to the youth associations to manage. However, the traditional leaders have been working against them to get the proceeds from selling and giving slots to their favorites.

Huni Valley Senior High School is a school in the region with educational technology.

Huni Valley Health Center is too big and equipped to be a hospital, and residents don't know why it's still a health center.

== Transport ==
=== Rail ===
Huni Valley is a junction on the west line for a cross country line to the east line.

Huni Valley is also the site of a concrete sleeper plant, which was built in 2008 to provide sleepers for the upgrade and extension of the west line to Hamile near the Ghana and Burkina Faso border.

== See also ==
- Railway stations in Ghana
- Transport in Ghana
