= Shai Hills =

- Suburban Area
- Location within Ghana
- Coordinates: 5°54′N 0°4′W
- Country: Ghana
- Region: Greater Accra Region
- District: Dangme West District
- Time zone: GMT
  - Summer (DST): GMT

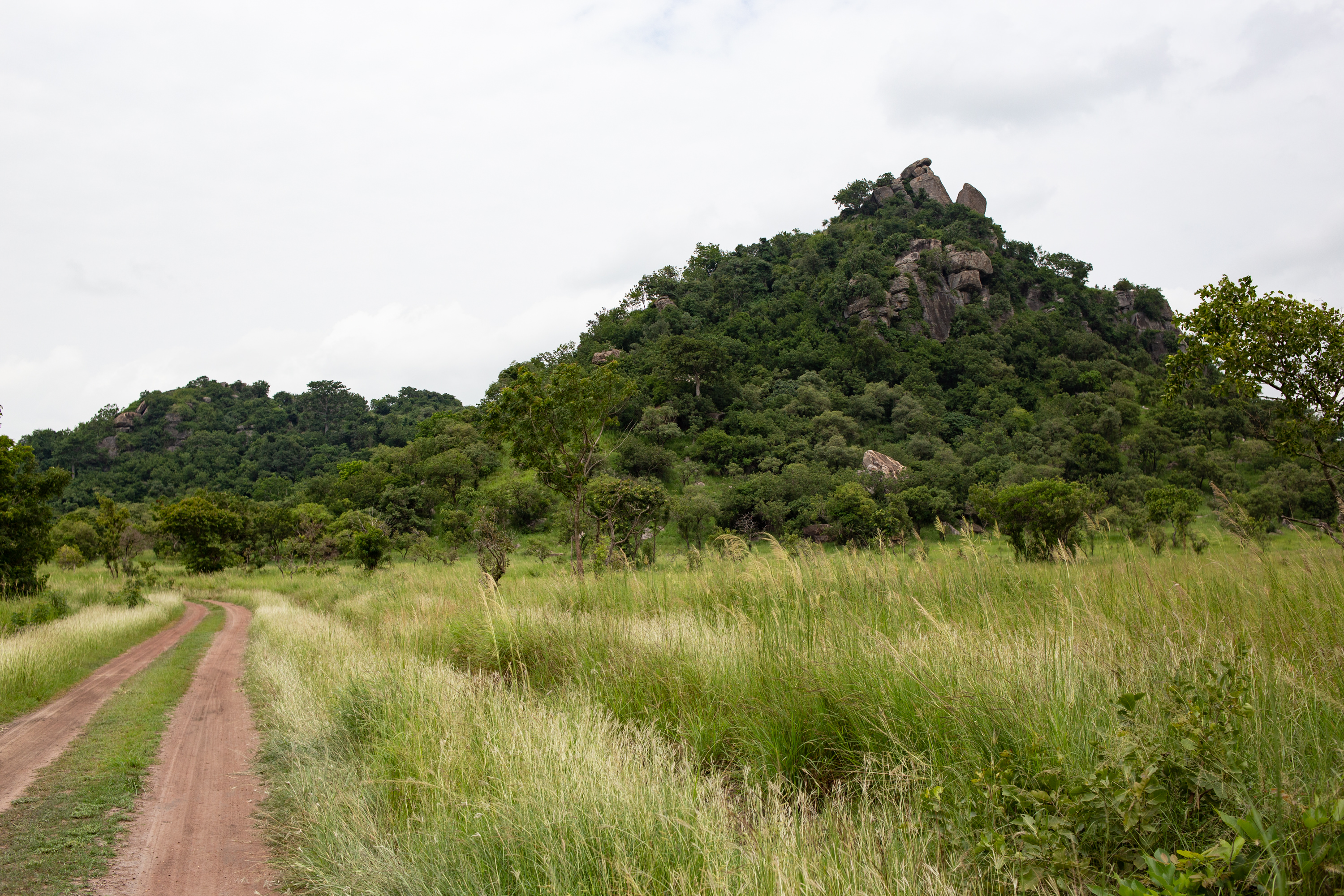
Shai Hills

Shai Hills is a suburb near the district capital Dodowa in the Dangme West District of the Greater Accra Region of Ghana, north of Accra.

Shai is a plain by topography but has outcrops of hills.The hills in the Shai area are based on several stone quarries. Its vegetation is a combination of open and wooded grassland, and fauna found there which include guinea fowls, antelopes, baboons, and francolins. The mosaic forest which hosts zebras, antelopes, ostriches, and baboons among others.

== Location ==
Shai Hills Resource Reserve is located along the Tema–Akosombo road and only 51 square kilometres and is the closest wildlife park to Accra, only 17 kilometers away compared to Mole National Park and Kakum National Park.

== Transport ==
Shai Hills is served by a railway station on the eastern part of the national railway network, and is indeed a suburban terminus. This has been their major source of transportation for a long time.

== Activities ==
- Camping
- Rock climbing
- Nature Walk (Hiking)
- Game Viewing
- Bird Watching
- Exploring the caves
- Quad Bike tours (Occasionally)

== See also ==
- Railway stations in Ghana
- Stone Quarry
