= Sheini =

Sheini Shieni
- Village
- Location within Ghana
- Coordinates: 9°9′N 0°29′E
- Country: Ghana
- Region: Northern Region
- District: Zabzugu-Tatale District
- Elevation: 469 ft (143 m)
- Time zone: GMT
  - Summer (DST): GMT

Sheini is a village in Zabzugu-Tatale District in the Northern Region of Ghana. Sheini is located in eastern Ghana on the border with Togo.

== Economy ==
=== Minerals ===
Sheini has unexploited deposits of iron ore. Exploration processes supervised by the Minerals Commission of Ghana are still ongoing. When completed iron ore is expected to surpass Gold as a primary source of revenue generated from the mining industry. Other minerals aside iron are being discovered also in huge quantities as contained in the first phase of the exploration report submitted to the Government. A railway to the coast would be required to export these minerals overseas.

== Transport ==
=== Railway station ===
In July 2007 contracts were made for the construction of a railway extension to this village.

== See also ==
- Iron ore in Africa
- Railway stations in Ghana – proposed
- Transport in Ghana
