= Transport in Ghana =

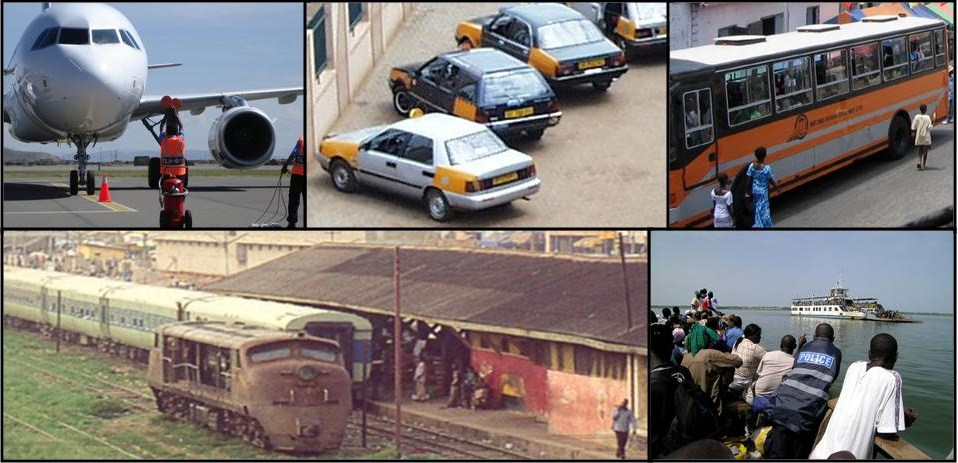
A collage of the Transport in Ghana and public transport systems in Ghana: Airbus A320 of a Ghana Regional Airline in Ghana, Taxicab system in Ghana, Bus Rapid Transit of Metro mass Transit L.T.D in Ghana, Railway Station and Kumasi Railway Station in Ghana, and Ferryboat transportation in Ghana.

Transport in Ghana is accomplished by road, rail, air and water. Ghana's transportation and communications networks are centered in the southern regions, especially the areas in which gold, cocoa, and timber are produced. The northern and central areas are connected through a major road system.

Increased transport investment helped to increase the number of new vehicle registrations and transportation alternatives include rail, road, ferry, marine and air.

== Railways ==
Ghana's railway network.

The railway system in Ghana has historically been confined to the plains south of the barrier range on mountains north of the city of Kumasi. However, the 1,067 mm (3 ft 6 in) narrow-gauge railway, totalling 935 kilometres (581 mi), is presently undergoing major rehabilitation and inroads to the interior are now being made. In Ghana, most of the lines are single tracked, and in 1997, it was estimated that 32 kilometres (20 mi) were double tracked.

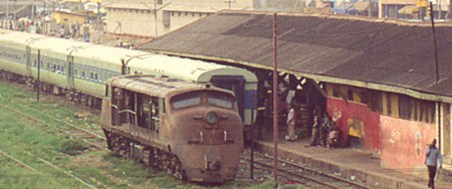
Railway Station in Kumasi, March 2002

=== Rail expansion ===
In 2005, the Minister of Ports, Harbours and Railways announced plans to extend the railway system to facilitate economic development. To begin, $5 million was invested for feasibility studies. Possible projects at the time included extending a line from Ejisu to Nkoranza and Techiman; a line from Tamale to Bolgatanga and Paga to Burkina Faso; a line from Wenchi, Bole to Wa and Hamile and also to Burkina Faso, and a line to Yendi where there are iron ore deposits.

Over the next two years, there were various studies and in 2007, work began.

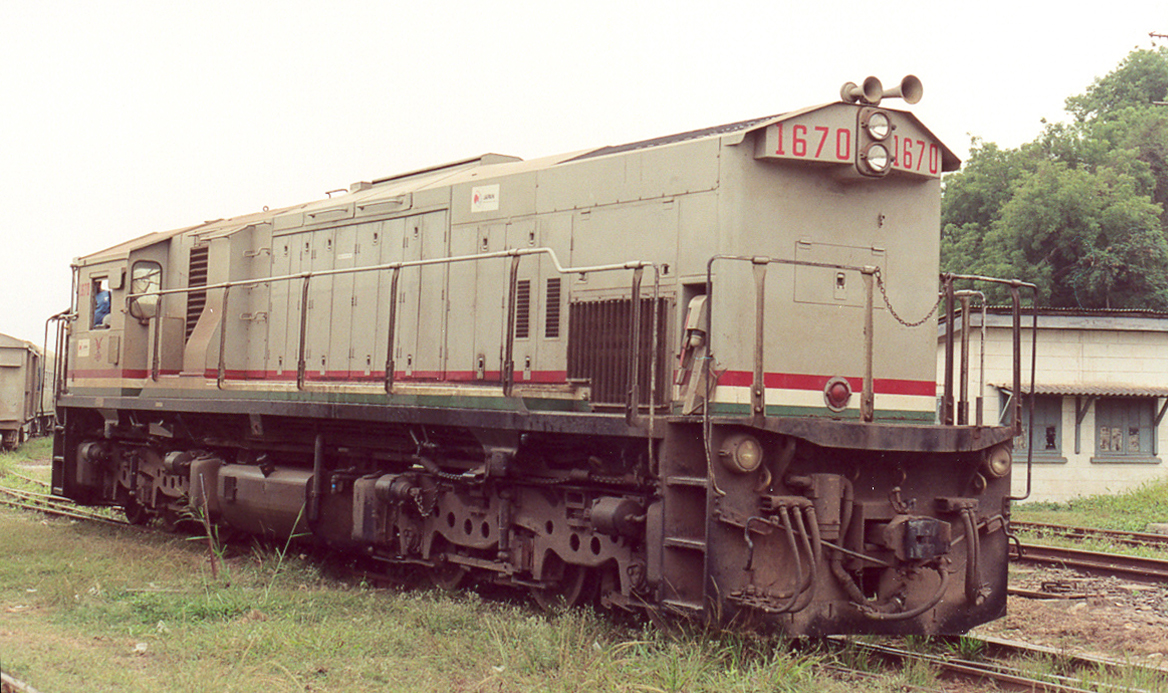
Ghana Railways Engine No. 1670 in Kumasi, June 2005

In March 2007, a Private Public Partnership was proposed to rehabilitate the Eastern Railway from Accra to Ejisu and Kumasi, with an extension from Ejisu via Mampong, Nkoranza, Tamale, Bolgatanga and Paga, with a branch from Tamale to Yendi and Sheini. The extension starts at Kumasi and will cost $1.6b.

There was another proposal in September 2007 to extend the Western Railway from Awaso via Techiman, Bole, Sawla, Wa to Hamile.

In February 2008, the Ghana General News reported that the Ministry of Harbours and Railways and the Ghana Railway Corporation (GRC) expected to complete a new commuter line linking Accra and Tema by June 2008. The formation was complete from Sakumono to the SSNIT flats near Tema. Diesel multiple-unit trainsets will be imported for use on the line. Construction of sleeper plant for the far north line was also initiated in 2008.

=== Rail transport ===
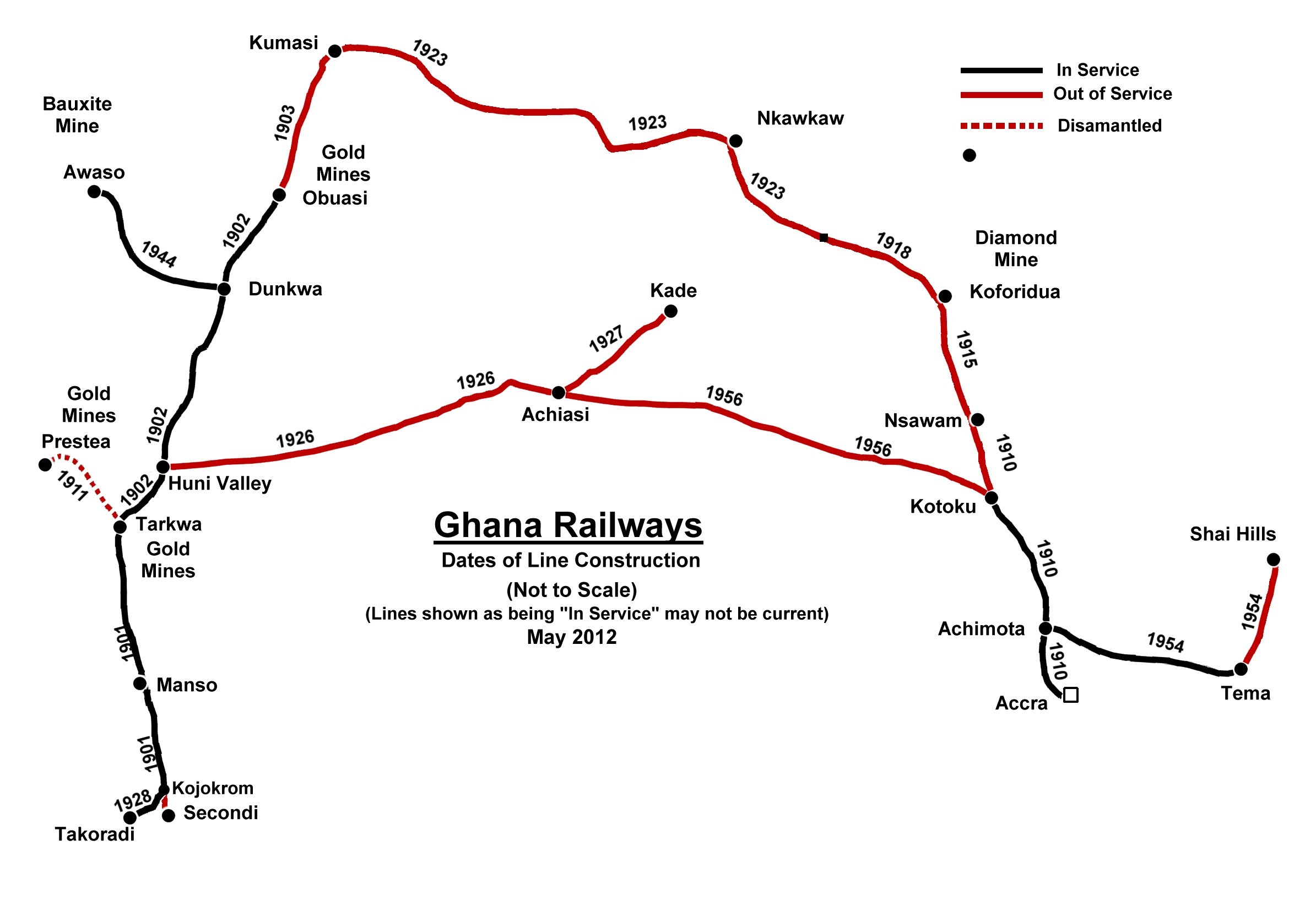
A railway map of Ghana showing dates of construction.

The Ghana railway network occupies a total rail route length and rail track length of 947 km and 1300 km, comprising national rail lines that do not go outside of Ghana and the Ghana national border. Ghana railway network is limited to south Ghana and the southern part of Ghana within the Greater Accra region, Central region, Western region, Eastern region and Ashanti region of south Ghana.

There are plans underway that revamp the operations of the Ghana Railway Corporation and Ghana Railway Company to make it more viable, and to attract private sector participation. Concession agreements have been signed by the Ghana Railway Corporation for the development and extension of the Ghana Eastern Rail Line and the rehabilitation of the Ghana Western Rail Line.

- The major rail routes in Ghana are the Ghana Eastern Rail Line that connects Kumasi to Koforidua, and the Ghana Western Rail Line that connects Kumasi to Sekondi-Takoradi, Sunyani and Cape Coast. In 2010, Ghana Railway Corporation began a GH₵12.9 billion (US$6 billion) rail project at the construction of the Ghana rail infrastructure to Ghana High-Speed Rail (abbreviated GHSR or HSR) and to upgrade all of Ghana's railway line network has been planned and to be completed at the end of 2014 with construction managed by the China Railway High-Speed (CHR) and the Chinese National Machinery Import and Export Corporation (CMC).

=== Service pending ===
These towns are proposed to be served by rail:

- Ejisu
- Kintampo
- Paga - near Burkina Faso and Ivory Coast borders.

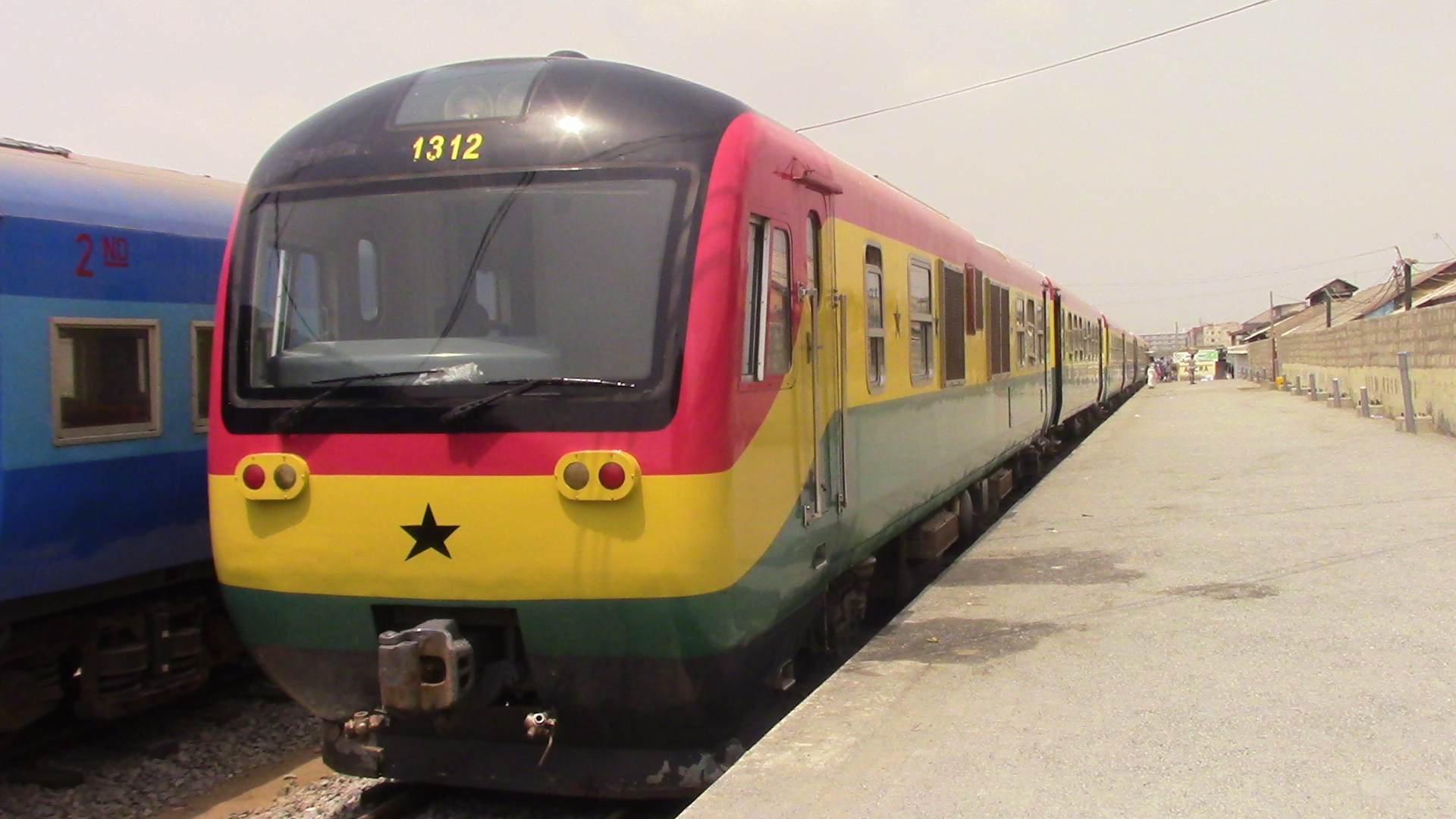
Train at Accra Railway Station

- Hamile - far northwest corner (Contracts were made for railway extensions in July 2007.)
- Boankra Inland Port (under construction)

=== Gauge conversion ===
Korean engineers studying the building of new lines in February 2007 were also to consider conversion to 1,435 mm (4 ft 8 1/2 in) standard gauge.

== Highways ==
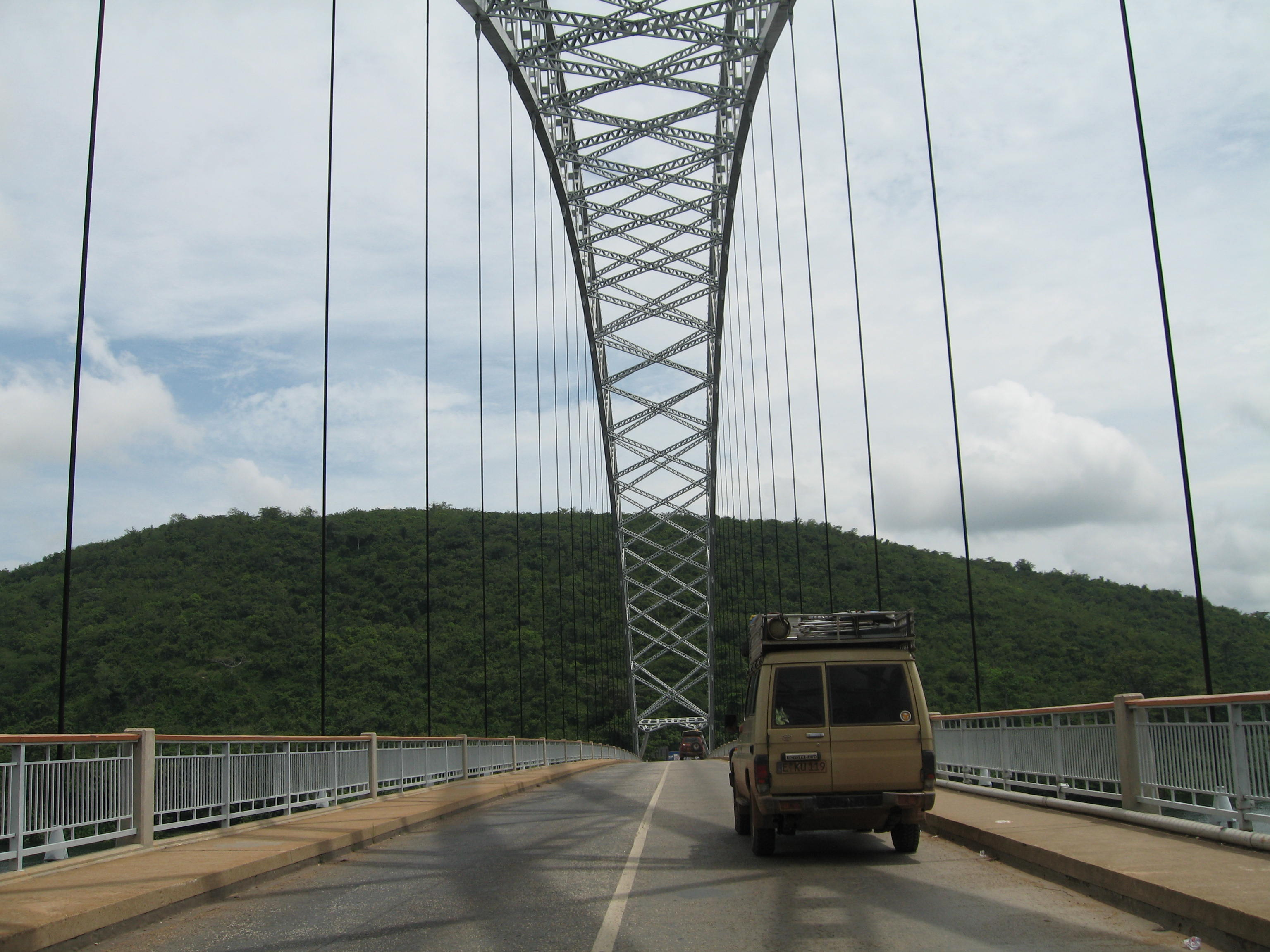
The Adome Bridge crosses the Volta River.

Road transport is by far the dominant carrier of freight and passengers in Ghana's land transport system. It carries over 95% of all passenger and freight traffic and reaches most communities, and is classified under three categories of trunk roads, urban roads, and feeder roads. The Ghana Highway Authority, established in 1974 is tasked with developing and maintaining the country's trunk road network totaling 13,367 km, which makes up 33% of Ghana's total road network of 40,186 km.

Trunk roads in Ghana are classified as National roads, Regional roads, and Inter-regional roads, all of which form the Ghana road network. National roads, designated with the letter N, link all the major population centers in Ghana. Regional roads, designated with the letter R, are a mix of primary and secondary routes, which serve as feeder roads to National roads; while Inter-Regional roads, designated with the prefix IR, connect major settlements across regional borders.

With respect to this mode of transport, many people prefer to use the public means. Many of the town and cities in the country can be reached by the use of urban buses known as "trotro" or taxis. For inter-regional transport bigger buses are normally used.

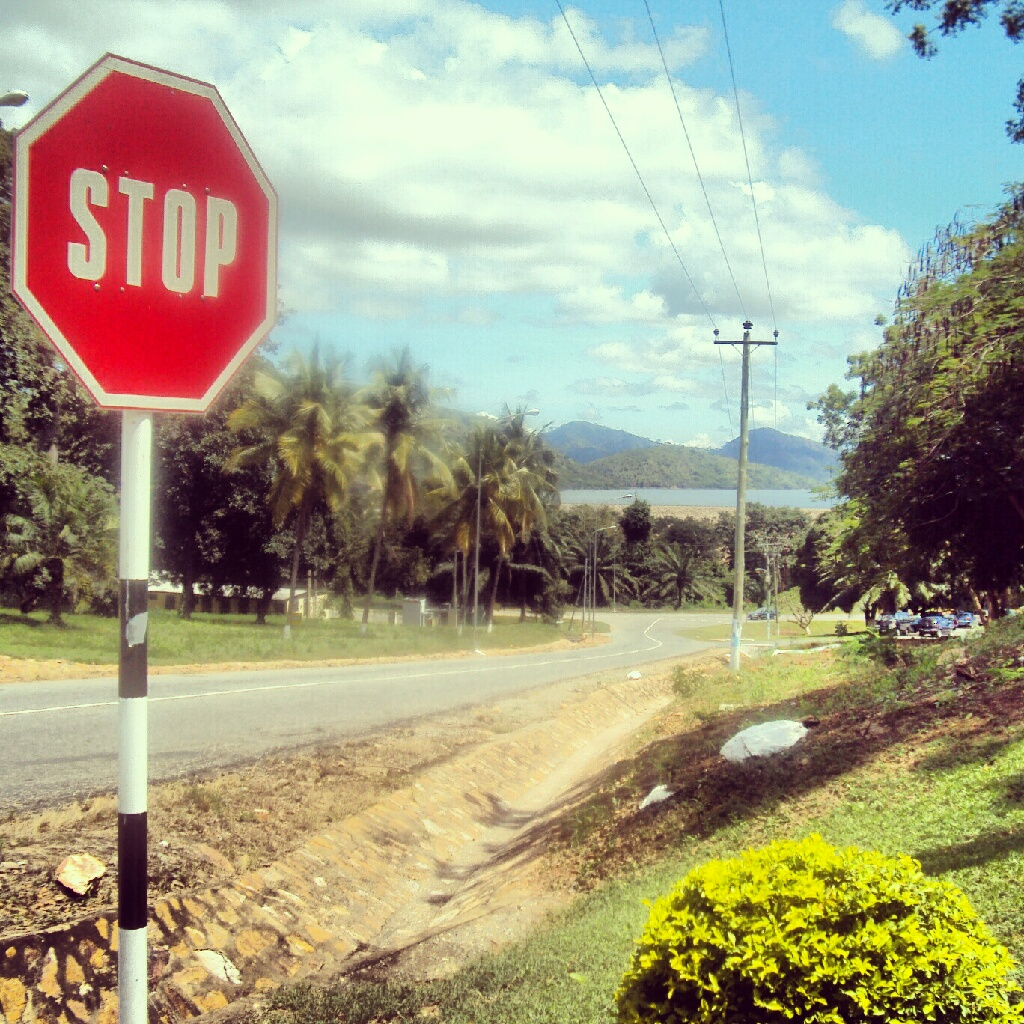
Dual Carriageway with a Stop Sign in Akosombo, Eastern region, Ghana.

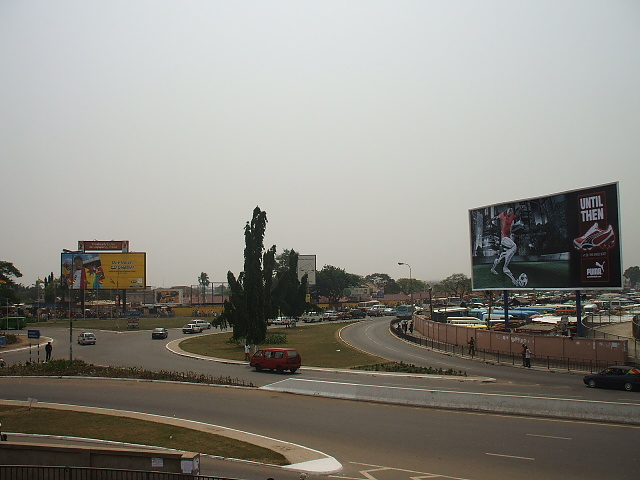
Traffic Circle in Greater Accra, Ghana.

The Ghana road network is 64,323 km and road transportation is the most dominant choice of transportation in Ghana. Road transport infrastructure in Ghana can be used throughout to facilitate the exchange of commodities and enable regular school attendance and fast access to health facilities in Ghana. There has been an increased investment and expansion in the road transportation of Ghana, GH₵1 billion (US$500 million) in 2012.

There is a Ghanaian Bus Rapid Transit, known as Metro mass Transit L.T.D, and a Taxicab system connecting the Ghanaian big cities among themselves, and a Minibuses system, known as Tro Tros, connecting big cities with the country's rural areas and small towns. The Ghana Police Service's Motor Transport and Traffic Unit (MTTU) and the Ghana Highways Authority is responsible for the maintenance of the Road Traffic Control of Ghana and the Ghana Road Network (Ghana national highways and motorways).

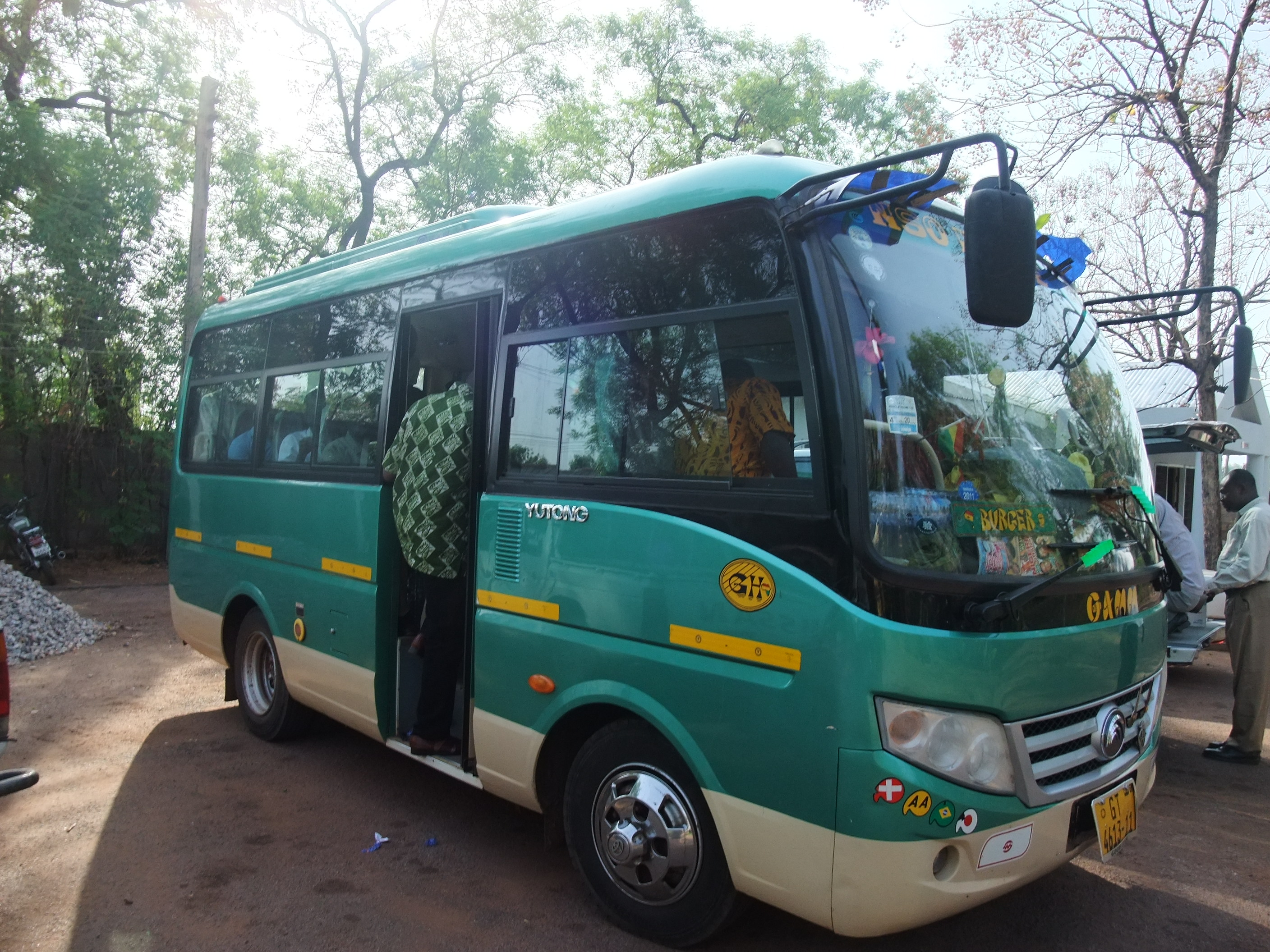
Tamale bus rapid transit system

=== International highways ===
The Trans–West African Coastal Highway, part of the Trans-African Highway network crosses Ghana along the N1, connecting it to Abidjan (Ivory Coast), Lomé (Togo) and to Benin and Nigeria. Eventually the highway will connect to another seven Economic Community of West African States (ECOWAS) nations to the west. The N2, which connects Tema in the Greater Accra Region to Kulungugu in the Upper East Region; the N10, which connects Yamoransa in the Central Region to Paga in the Upper East Region; and the N12, which connects Elubo in the Western Region to Hamile in the Upper West Region; all connect Ghana to landlocked Burkina Faso, where it joins another highway in the Trans-African network, the Trans-Sahelian Highway.

== Ferries and waterways ==
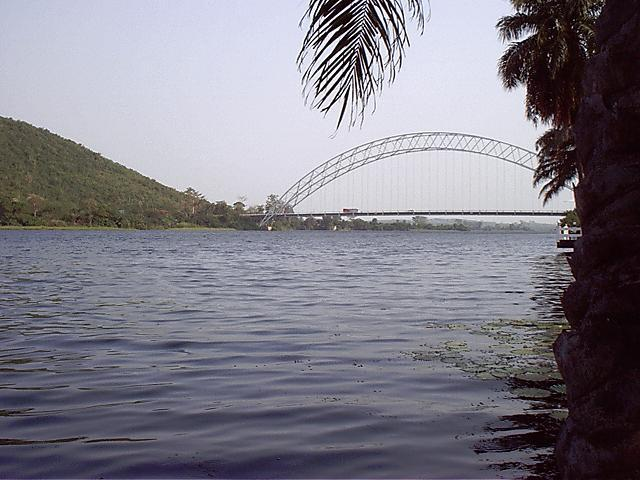
The Volta River is the largest artificial lake in the world by surface area.

The Volta, Ankobra, and Tano rivers provide 168 km of perennial navigation for launches and lighters; Lake Volta provides 1,125 kilometres of arterial and feeder waterway.

There are ferries on Lake Volta at Yeji and Kwadjokrom.

== Marine transport ==
=== Seaports and harbours ===
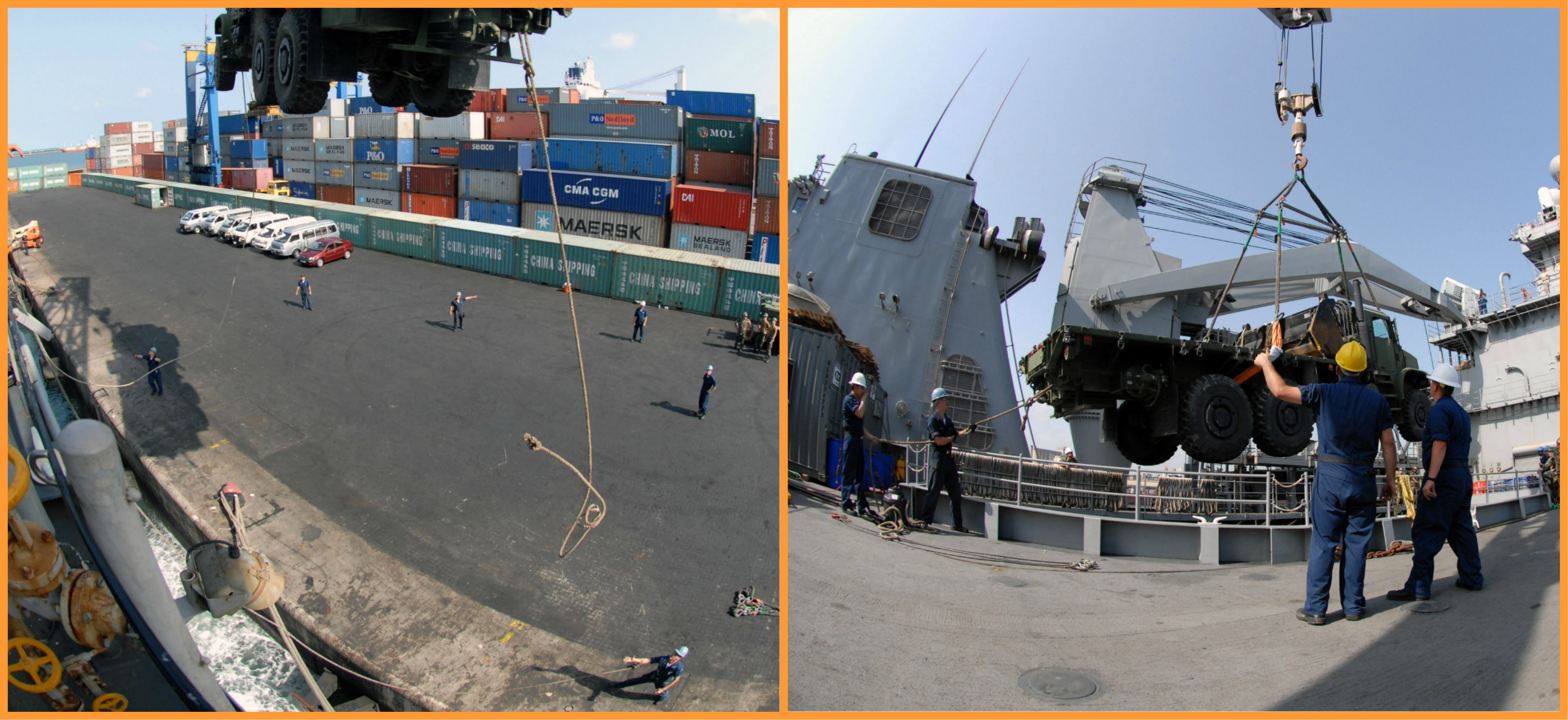
Container ships and Merchant ships being loaded and unloaded at the Intermodal freight transport of Tema Port.

There are ports on the Atlantic Ocean at Takoradi and Tema. Tema Port in South Ghana, officially opened in 1962, is the bigger of the two seaports in Ghana, and is Africa's largest manmade harbour. It has a water-enclosed area of 1.7 square kilometres (0.66 mi^{2}) and a total land area of 3.9 square kilometres (1.5 mi^{2}). Apart from handling goods for Ghana, it is also a traffic junction, where goods are transhipped, and transit cargo destined for the landlocked countries to the north of Ghana.

The port of Tema handles the majority of the nation's import and export cargo and most of the country's chief exports is shipped from Sekondi-Takoradi and Tema. The port of Tema has 5 kilometres (3.1 mi) of breakwaters, 12 deepwater berths, an outsize oil tanker berth, a dockyard, warehouses, and transit sheds. The port has open and covered areas for the storage of cargo, including a 77,200-m^{2} (7.72-hectare) paved area for the storage of containers, steel products and other conventional cargo. The port's container yard is capable of holding over 8,000 TEUs at any given time. The closed storage area, which is about 25,049 m^{2} (2.51 hectares) in area, consists of six sheds with a total storage capacity of 50,000 tonnes of cargo. The port also includes a 100,000 dwt dry dock and slipway facility. The Tema and Takoradi harbours in South Ghana are operated by the Ghana Ports and Harbours Authority.

In 2019 the port opened a new deep-water container terminal, Terminal 3, built and operated by Meridian Port Services — a joint venture of APM Terminals, Bolloré Africa Logistics (now Africa Global Logistics) and the Ghana Ports and Harbours Authority. Built at a cost of around US$1.5 billion and equipped with a 16-metre-draught quay, it has an annual capacity of more than one million TEU, making it one of the largest container terminals on the West African coast.

=== Merchant marine ===
There are six ships (with a volume of 1,000 gross tonnage (GT) or over) totaling 13,484 GT/18,583 tonnes deadweight (DWT). This includes two petroleum tankers and four refrigerated cargo vessels (1999 estimates).

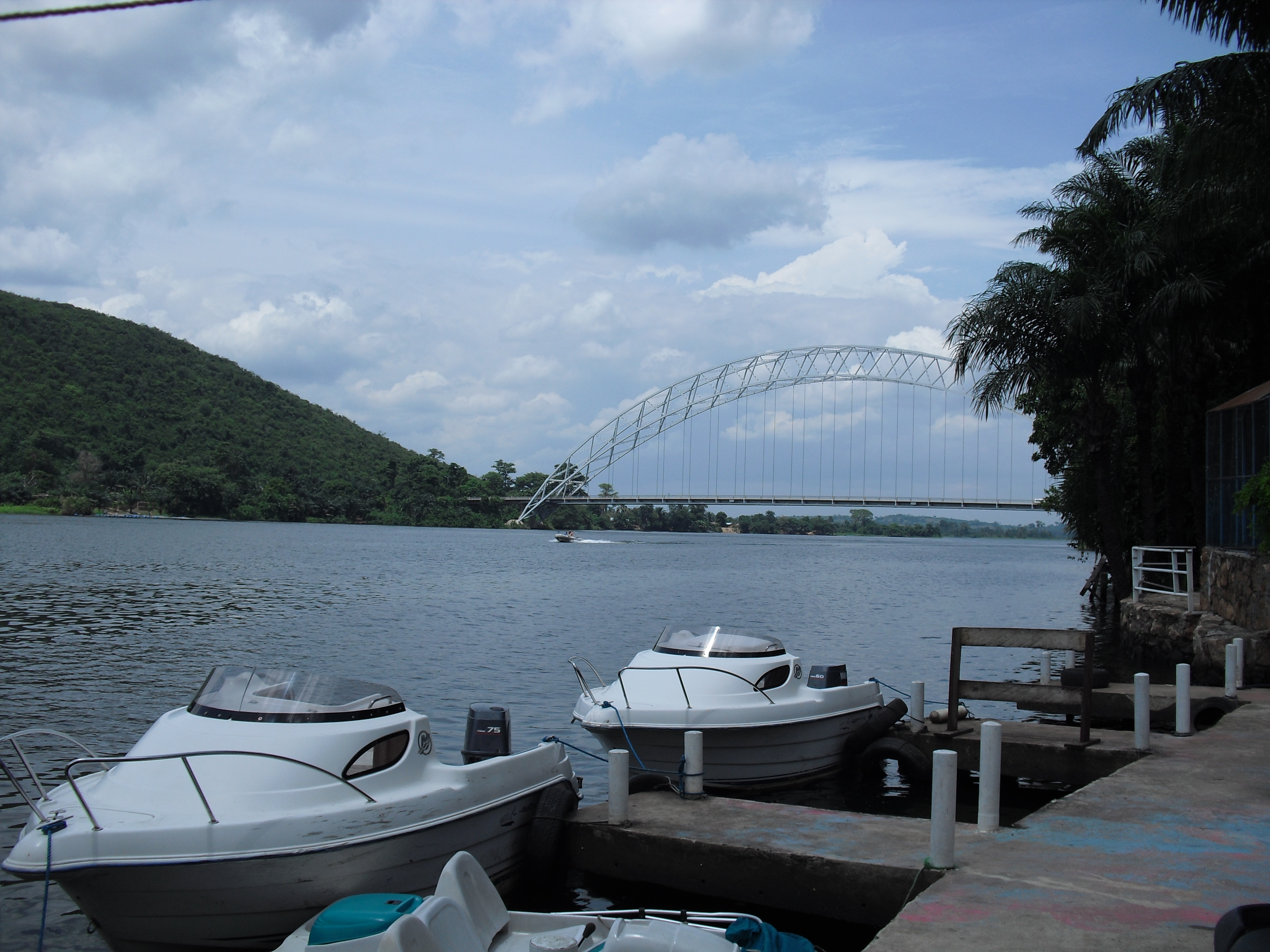
Water taxis on Volta Lake in Ghana

Ghana's Volta River, Ankobra River, and Tano River provide 168 km of perennial navigation for launches and lighters, and Volta Lake provides 1,125 kilometres of arterial and feeder waterway. There are two main seaports in Ghana which are located in the southern coastal cities of Sekondi-Takoradi and Tema (Takoradi Harbour and Tema Harbour). The strategic geographical location of Ghana to the Volta Lake and the many rivers of Ghana that provide inland transport make Ghana a very transited sovereign state for freighters.

Inland water transport in Ghana includes the movement of passengers by ferry or water taxis and cargo on rivers, lakes and other water bodies in Ghana and Ghana has a ferry transportation system on Volta Lake at Yeji and Kwadjokrom. The Volta Lake is the major inland water transport facility that is efficiently regulated to transport passengers and cargo. The main transport service provider on the Volta Lake is the Volta Lake Transport Company Limited (VLTC). The Ghana Ports and Harbours Authority and Ghana Railway Corporation and the Volta River Authority collectively have oversight responsibility over the Volta Lake and the Volta Lake Transport Company Limited (VLTC).

== Aviation ==
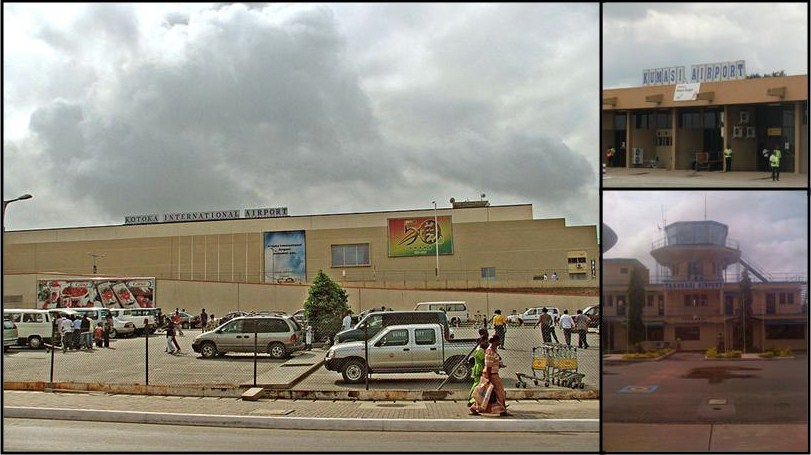
Kotoka International Airport in Accra, Kumasi International Airport in Kumasi, and Sekondi-Takoradi Airport in Sekondi-Takoradi.

On July 4, 1958, the Ghanaian government established Ghana Airways connecting Ghana with other countries. By the mid-1990s, Ghana Airways operated international scheduled passenger and cargo service to numerous European, Middle Eastern, and African destinations, including London, Düsseldorf, Rome, Abidjan, Dakar, Lagos, Lomé, and Johannesburg. As a result of persistent management and financial problems, Ghana Airways ceased all operations and entered into liquidation in 2004.

Ghana has twelve airports, six with hard surfaced runways. The most important are Kotoka International Airport at Accra and airports at Sekondi-Takoradi, Kumasi, and Tamale that serve domestic air traffic. In 1990, the government spent US$12 million to improve Accra's facilities. Workmen resurfaced the runway, upgraded the lighting system and built a new freight terminal. Construction crews also extended and upgraded the terminal building at Kumasi. In early 1991, the government announced further plans to improve Accra's international airport. The main runway was upgraded, improvements were made in freight landing and infrastructure, and the terminal building and the airport's navigational aids were upgraded.

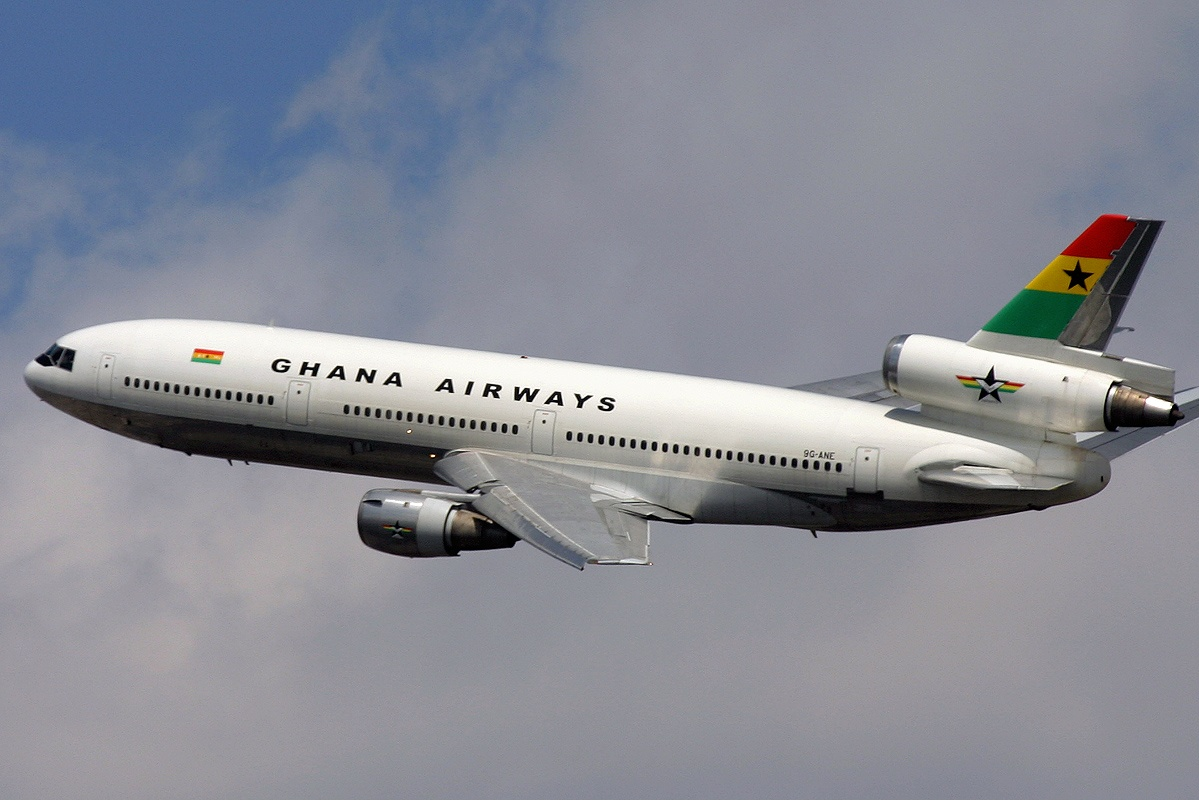
McDonnell Douglas DC-10 of Ghana Airways

The first Ghanaian flag carrier was the Ghana Airways which commenced operations in 1958; then ceased operations in 2005 and was succeeded by the Ghana International Airlines in 2005. Ghana has a vibrant airline industry and there are five main airports in Ghana: Kotoka International Airport in Greater Accra, Kumasi Airport in Kumasi, Sekondi-Takoradi Airport in Western Ghana, Sunyani Airport in Sunyani, and Tamale Airport in Tamale. In addition, Ghana has a total of 8 airports, of which the most transited is the Kotoka International Airport located in Accra, with a transit in 2009 of 1.2 million passengers.

In 2005, Ghana International Airlines (GIA) began services as the new national airline of Ghana. GIA operated Boeing 757 and Boeing 767 aircraft under wet lease arrangements with other airlines, and connected Kotoka International Airport in Accra with London Gatwick and Düsseldorf. After several years GIA also ceased operations. After the cessation of operations of Ghana International Airlines in 2010, major airlines of Ghana are Africa World Airlines, Antrak Air, CTK – CiTylinK and Starbow Airlines which fly to domestic destinations in Ghana, around the world and to main flight points of the Africa continent. There are also some commercial airlines running domestic flights between the major cities in Ghana. In 2010, Ghana planned for the revival of Ghana Airways to commence commercial aviation. At present there exists no Ghanaian airline providing long-haul international services.

Between 2009 and 2013, the number of air passengers in Ghana more than quadrupled.

=== Airports - with paved runways ===
Kotoka International Airport
total: 6
2,438 to 3,047 m: 1
1,524 to 2,437 m: 3
914 to 1,523 m: 2 (1999 est.)

=== Airports - with unpaved runways ===
total: 6
1,524 to 2,437 m:not true

1
914 to 1,523 m: 3
under 914 m: 2

== See also ==
- Ghana
- List of airports in Ghana
