= Asoprochona =

- Suburban Area
- Location within Ghana
- Coordinates: 5°44′N 0°4′W
- Country: Ghana
- Region: Greater Accra Region
- District: Accra Metropolis District
- Time zone: GMT
  - Summer (DST): GMT

Asoprochona is a suburb north of the capital Accra in the Accra Metropolis District of the Greater Accra Region of Ghana.

== Transport ==
Asoprochona is served by a railway station on the eastern part of the national railway network, and is indeed a suburban terminus.

The station has a loop to enable locomotives to runaround the train.

== See also ==
- Railway stations in Ghana
