= Sugbaniate =

Town in Tema, Ghana

Coordinates: 05°49′00″N 00°01′00″W

Sugbaniate is a town in Greater Accra Region in southern Ghana, just north of the port at Tema.

== Transport ==
It is served by a station on the national railway network.

== See also ==
- Railway stations in Ghana
