= Mining industry of Ghana =

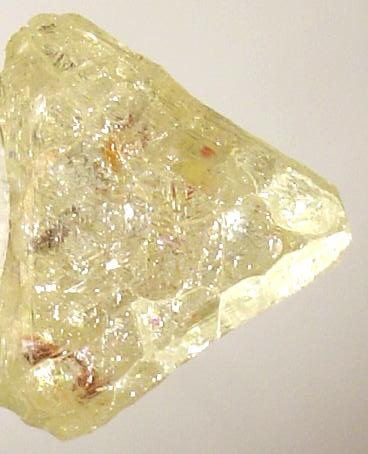
A large, sharp, equant, translucent, yellow, spinel-twinned or macle twinned Diamond (Super macle twinned Diamond)from Akwatia Diamond Mine and Birim Diamond Field at Akwatia in the Eastern Region; and a couple of inclusions add character to this thick, lustrous crystal.

Mining in Ghana is a major contributor to the economy of Ghana, providing about 40% of its foreign exchange earnings as well as about 5.7% of its Gross Domestic Product. Gold dominates the mineral sector, contributing over 90% of total mineral exports. In 2019, Ghana overtook South Africa to become the largest gold producer in Africa, producing 142.4 metric tonnes of gold that year.

Ghana's mining sector produces minerals such as bauxite, manganese, natural gas, petroleum, salt, silver and diamonds. In 2020, the country produced approximately 1.16 million metric tons of bauxite, ranking it among Africa's top bauxite exporters. In recent years, Ghana has identified substantial lithium deposits.

== History ==
Mining in Ghana predates colonial times, with evidence showing that gold mining in the region has been carried out for centuries. Indigenous communities mined gold along riverbanks such as the Pra and Ankobra Rivers using rudimentary tools, long before the arrival of Europeans. Gold played a central role in the development of the Ashanti Empire, which traded extensively with North Africa and Europe through trans-Saharan trade routes. Culturally, Gold is quite significant across the southern belt of the country. As a country, it is built into our national identity, drawing upon the term "Gold Coast" as its former name and the yellow in the Ghanaian flag, which signifies Ghana's mineral-rich nature. It is especially prominent in the Ashanti culture, with the "soul of the Ashanti Kingdom" being sika dua Kofi, the golden stool. It is also historically a symbol of status. The Ashanti King, for example, is adorned with several ancient gold ornaments on every tradition-inspired appearance.

With the arrival of Portuguese explorers in the 15th century, European powers began to recognize the region's vast gold reserves. By the late 19th century, during British colonial rule, commercial mining operations began to take shape. The establishment of the Gold Coast Colony in 1821 marked the beginning of organized gold mining, primarily in areas such as Obuasi and Tarkwa, which would later emerge as major mining hubs. The existence of alluvial gold in different parts of Ghana is a major reason for its colonial history, with Ghana then the Gold Coast. It is noted that several writings about Ghana by the Dutch allude to the prominence of gold mining as a major economic activity in the Gold Coast.

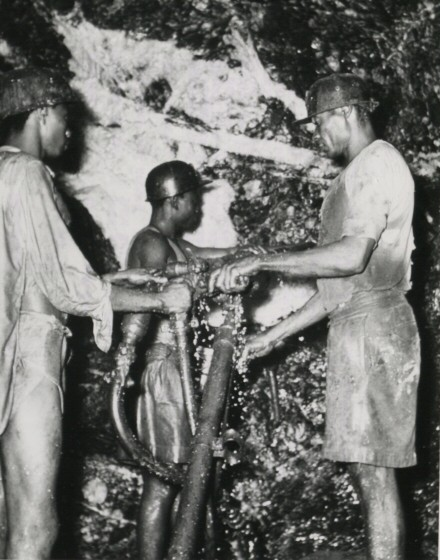
Gold miners at work in the Tarkwa Gold Mine This drilling machine crew are working 1,800 feet below the ground.

The Ashanti Goldfields Corporation, established in 1897, became a significant player in the industry and contributed to the Gold Coast's economy. Colonial authorities constructed railways and ports to facilitate the transportation of minerals.

Following Ghana's independence in 1957, the mining industry saw a shift in focus. This led to the establishment of the Ghana State Mining Corporation (GSMC) in 1961, which was later reincorporated as the State Gold Mining Corporation (SGMC) in 1964. The SGMC took over operations of several mines, including those in Obuasi and Tarkwa, aiming to maximize national revenues from gold mining.

The economic reforms of the 1980s and 1990s under the Structural Adjustment Program initiated a liberalization of the mining sector. This period saw the influx of foreign direct investment, particularly from companies in Canada, Australia, and South Africa. Key legislative reforms, such as the Minerals and Mining Act of 2006, aimed to attract investors and ensure sustainable practices in the sector. During this period, large-scale mining projects, such as AngloGold Ashanti's Obuasi mine and Newmont Goldcorp's Ahafo mine, began producing gold. By 2019, Ghana had overtaken South Africa to become Africa's largest gold producer.

While large-scale mining dominates Ghana's economy, small-scale and artisanal mining (locally known as "galamsey") also flourish, particularly in rural areas. These activities, often informal and unregulated, contributes to gold production but brings challenges such as environmental degradation and conflicts over land use.

== Commodities ==
=== Gold ===
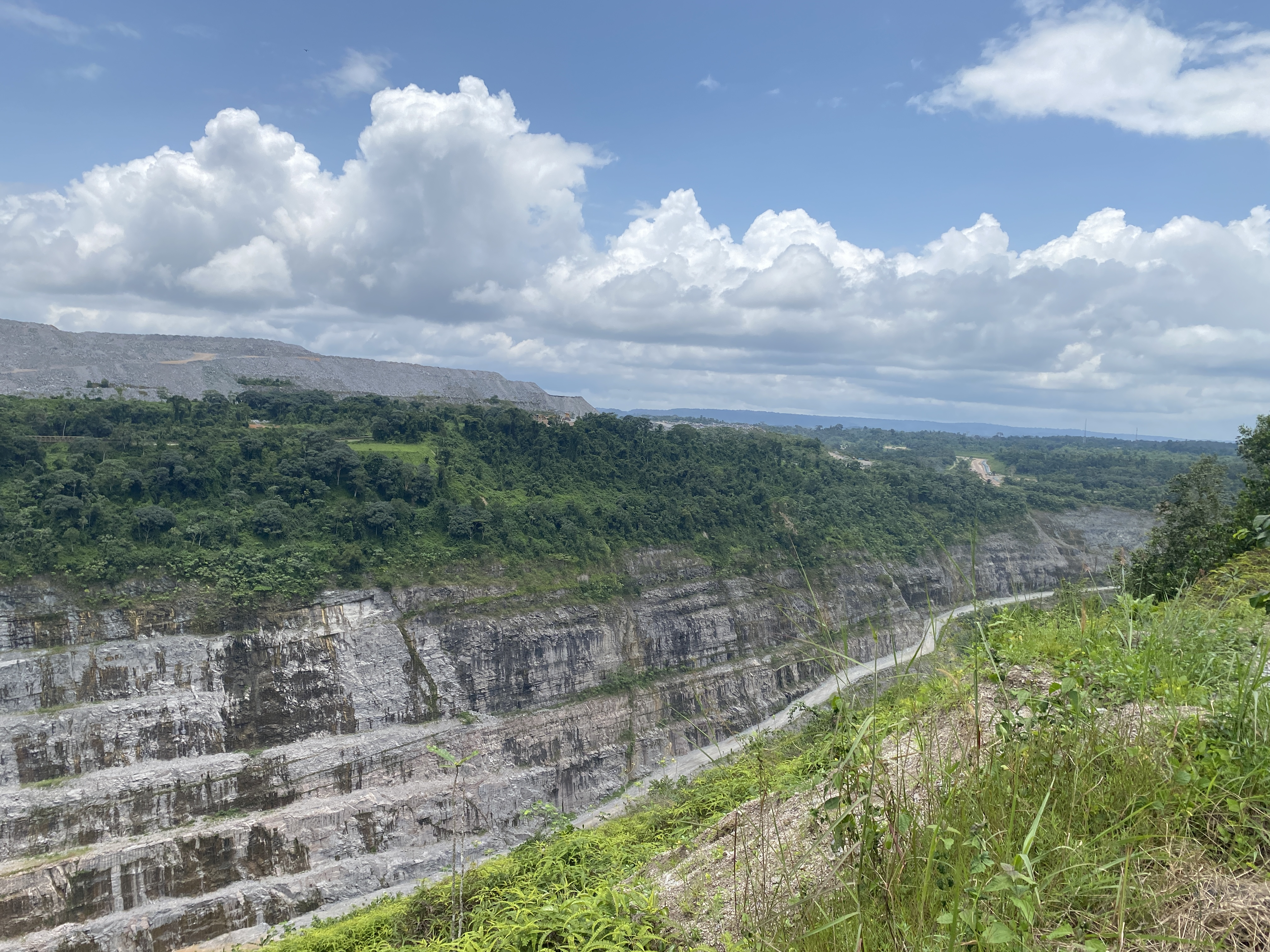
Surface mining pit Anglogold Ashanti Iduapreim Ghana

Ghana is one of the largest gold producers in Africa, and it ranks as the sixth-largest producer globally. Gold has been central to the country's economy for decades. In 2023, Ghana produced around 4.2 million ounces of gold, contributing to approximately 4% of the world's total output. The main gold-producing regions are Ashanti, Western, and Eastern regions, with major players including Newmont, Gold Fields, AngloGold Ashanti, Asante Gold,Perseus Mining and Zijin. As of November 2026 the Ghana Chamber of Mines listed eleven producing member companies, all mining gold except Ghana Manganese, and four companies preparing to produce, including the Atlantic Lithium project.. Gold exports in 2022 accounted for about 12.3% of Ghana's GDP.

The country's gold deposits are primarily located within two major goldfields: the Ashanti Gold Belt and the Western Region Goldfields. The Ashanti Gold Belt, in particular, is home to some of the most notable gold mines in the country, including the Ahafo and Akyem mines, both operated by Newmont. The Obuasi mine, one of the oldest gold mines in Ghana, is also situated within this region and is operated by AngloGold Ashanti. The mine has been in operation since the 1890s and remains one of the largest contributors to Ghana's gold output.

In the Western Region, the Tarkwa and Damang mines are major players in the gold sector. Tarkwa, operated by Gold Fields, is one of the largest gold mines in the country and has been producing gold since 1998. The Damang mine, also operated by Gold Fields, is a contributor to Ghana's gold exports.

=== Manganese ===
Manganese is another key mineral in Ghana. The country ranks as Africa's second-largest producer of manganese, with production reaching approximately 2.5 million metric tons in 2022. In 2022, Ghana exported $436 million in manganese ore, making it the fourth largest exporter in the world. The main destinations for Ghana's manganese ore exports are China, Ukraine, France, and the Netherlands.

Ghana's manganese reserves are primarily concentrated in the Western Region, where the country's main manganese mines are located. The Ghana Manganese Company Limited (GMCL) is the sole producer and exporter of manganese in the country. GMCL holds a mining concession over 170 square kilometers in the Western Region, centered around Nsuta. The Nsuta mine has been operational since 1916, making it one of the oldest manganese mines globally.

=== Bauxite ===
Ghana holds significant bauxite deposits, an ore essential for aluminium production. As of 2022, Ghana produced approximately 1.5 million metric tons of bauxite, making it an important player in the global bauxite market. The country's bauxite reserves are primarily concentrated in the Awaso and Nyinahin areas, which are the main sources of the country's bauxite production.

=== Iron ore ===
Iron ore mining in Ghana is still in its early stages. In 2022, the country produced an estimated 920,000 metric tons of iron ore, with production expected to increase as the industry matures. Ghana's iron ore reserves are primarily located in the Western and Northern regions, notably in the Bawdie and Shieni areas, which are recognized for their significant iron ore deposits.

=== Diamond ===
Diamond is another notable contributor to the country's economy. In 2023, Ghana produced approximately 203,000 carats of diamonds, primarily sourced from alluvial deposits in the Akwatia region. The diamond industry in Ghana is largely export-driven, with a smaller domestic industry focused on cutting and polishing. The majority of Ghana's diamonds are exported to international markets, contributing to the country's mining exports.

The Akwatia region, located in the Eastern Region of Ghana, is the principal source of diamonds in the country. The area has been known for its diamond deposits since the 1920s, and mining operations have been ongoing since then.

=== Petroleum and natural gas ===
A 2010 map to the location of the "Jubilee field" for petroleum (earth oil/gas) (red marked) before the western coast of Ghana near the border to Côte d'Ivoire.

Ghana's oil and gas industry has experienced notable developments in recent years. In 2022, the country produced approximately 60,000 barrels of oil per day and 200 million cubic feet of natural gas daily, primarily from offshore fields such as Jubilee and TEN. Ghana's petroleum industry generated a record revenue of US$1.43 billion in 2022, the highest since the inception of oil production in the country.

The Jubilee field, situated approximately 60 kilometers offshore in Ghana's Western Region, was discovered in 2007 and is the country's flagship oil field. It started production in 2010 and is operated by Tullow Oil, with other partners including Kosmos Energy, Anadarko, and the Ghana National Petroleum Corporation (GNPC). The field has been a significant contributor to Ghana's oil industry, with production reaching 300 million barrels by October 2020.

=== Salt ===
Salt production in Ghana is an essential industry that plays a significant role in both local consumption and export. In 2022, Ghana produced approximately 1.2 million metric tons of salt, making it one of the leading producers in West Africa. The majority of the salt is harvested through evaporation ponds along the coastal regions, with the Greater Accra and Volta regions being the primary production areas. In 2022, Ghana exported $4.36 million worth of salt, ranking it as the 59th largest exporter globally.

=== Silver ===
Silver mining in Ghana is minimal compared to gold and it is produced in smaller quantities as a by-product of gold mining. In 2022, Ghana's silver production was estimated at approximately 10,000 metric tons, primarily extracted during the processing of gold ores. While silver plays a secondary role in Ghana's mining industry, it still contributes to the overall mining sector, alongside gold and other minerals.

The country's silver production is primarily tied to gold mining operations in the Ashanti, Western, and Eastern regions, which are the main hubs for gold extraction. Major players like Newmont, Gold Fields, and AngloGold Ashanti oversee extensive mining operations in these areas, where silver is often recovered during the refining process of gold. Additionally, the Obuasi mine, also produces a small amount of silver as a by-product of its gold production.

=== Lithium ===
The current world need for lithium in electrical appliances, especially in batteries, has prompted more investigation into areas of the world with good amounts of rock formation that may contain this valuable substance. Southern Ghana happens to be one of them.Lithium is emerging as a significant focus of Ghana's mineral exploration efforts. The country has identified lithium deposits primarily in the Ashanti and Western regions, with several exploration projects underway.

== Impact of mining ==
=== Economic development ===
The mining sector in Ghana has contributed to the nation's economic growth, with gold being a central export commodity. In 2023, Ghana produced approximately 4.2 million ounces of gold, accounting for about 4% of the world's total output. The primary gold-producing regions include Ashanti, Western, and Eastern regions, with major players such as Newmont, Gold Fields, AngloGold Ashanti, and Kinross Gold. Gold exports in 2022 represented approximately 12.3% of Ghana's GDP. Artisanal gold mining, locally known as "galamsey", has been credited with contributing to the development of local economies.

In 2023, Ghana's mining sector continued to be a significant contributor to the nation's economy. The sector's mineral revenue increased by 4.3%, rising from US$5.6 billion in 2022 to US$5.8 billion in 2023. Gold remains the leading export commodity from Ghana, contributing the highest percentage of the country's total export earnings.

As of October 2024, gold exports alone accounted for $9.58 billion, representing more than half of Ghana's total export earnings of $16.5 billion. The mining sector also emerged as the largest source of domestic tax revenue in 2023, contributing a record GH₵11.55 billion (US$980 million) in taxes. in 2025 the government of Ghana established the Ghana GoldBod which boosted the Bank of Ghana's gold reserves from 8.77 t in 2022 to 30.8 t by February 2025, with foreign reserves reaching US $9.4 billion.

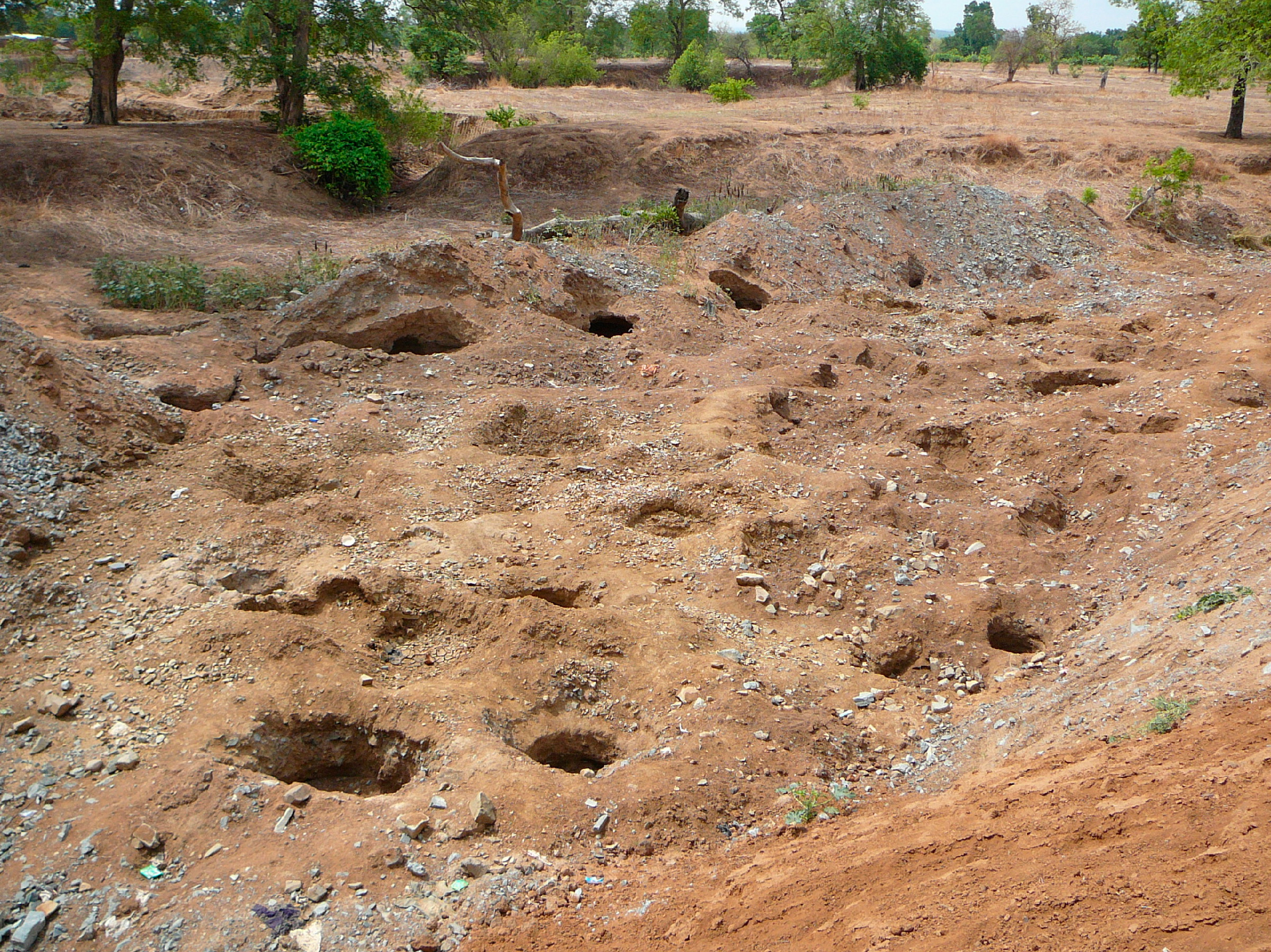
Illegal mining site at Talensi District

=== Environmental impact ===
Mining activities in Ghana, particularly gold extraction, have raised environmental concerns. The processes involved, including land clearing, excavation, and waste disposal, have led to habitat destruction, soil erosion, and water pollution. Illegal small-scale mining, known locally as "galamsey," has exacerbated these issues. The unregulated use of hazardous chemicals like mercury and cyanide in galamsey operations has resulted in the contamination of water bodies.

Deforestation is another critical concern, as mining activities have led to the clearing of vast forested areas, disrupting ecosystems and contributing to biodiversity loss. The Atewa Range Forest Reserve has faced threats from bauxite mining, sparking environmental protests and legal actions.

=== Health Impact ===
Regulation of small-scale mining in Ghana, unfortunately, is almost non-existent, coupled with this lucrative venture's environmental and health hazards. With data from studies that used different methods of examination, it was determined that mercury pollution as a result of artisan/ small-scale mining caused neurological and renal (kidney-related) issues among residents of neighboring communities. Small-scale mining, known commonly in Ghana as Galamsey, has been a known cancer to Ghana's environmental sustainability, with its major side effects being mercury pollution, either through vapor or through water pollution, and fish consumption. This implies that the issue of non-regulation ultimately affects all of the Ghanaian government's attempts to reduce the growth of this cancer, with small-scale mining still accounting for thousands of hectares of mining operations despite bans on mining throughout the measurement, hence increasing amounts of mercury being released without adequate regulation. This goes on to cause various health effects on members of mining communities.

=== Accidents ===
In 2023, the mining industry recorded seven fatalities, an increase from just one in 2022, marking a 600% surge in mining-related deaths. In addition to fatalities, there has been an uptick in other reportable injuries. The number of first aid injuries increased from 156 in 2022 to 162 in 2023. However, the frequency of near-miss incidents declined by 21.8%, from 325 in 2022 to 254 in 2023. The only documented accidents in the sector are those recorded in the company-supervised mines. The danger in the small-scale arena is unimaginable because there has been such a huge surge even in these areas. In the words of the CEO of Ghana Chamber of Mines, "These incidents underscore the critical importance of rigorous safety practices." It is quite noticeable that a significant portion of the mining practices are small-scale, implying that there is more danger out there than has been realized. It is also worth pointing out that a considerable portion of the practice is also illegal.

== See also ==
- Geology of Ghana
- Economy of Ghana
