= 2007 in rail transport =

This article lists events related to rail transport that occurred in 2007.

== Events ==
=== January events ===
- January 5 – The first public trains of Taiwan High Speed Rail operate between Taipei and Kaohsiung, a 216 miles (348 km) journey, in 1:36 hours.
- January 9 – Government of Estonia buys back majority share in Eesti Raudtee, the national rail operator, from private investors.
- (United States) January 12 – Railway Age Magazine selects Bill Wimmer, Vice President Engineering for Union Pacific Railroad to receive the 2007 award for Railroader of the Year.
- January 30 – The suburban rail network of Melbourne, Australia is thrown into chaos as much of the fleet of new Siemens Nexas Electric Multiple Unit trains is withdrawn from service after a number of incidents of brake failure.

=== February events ===
- (Georgia (country)) February 7 – At a meeting in Tbilisi, Georgian President Mikheil Saakashvili, Turkish Prime Minister Recep Tayyip Erdoğan and Azerbaijani President Ilham Aliyev sign an agreement authorizing construction of the new Kars-Tbilisi-Baku railway linking the three nations.
- February 9 – About 2,800 train crew employees of Canadian National (CN) wage a strike action against the railway; the striking workers are members of UTU Canada, the Canadian affiliate of the United Transportation Union.
- (France) February 13 – During a test run a TGV train reaches 553 km/h (343.75 mph) under test conditions with a shortened train on the LGV Est near Passavant-en-Argonne (Marne), 190 km east of Paris.
- (India) February 18 – 2007 Samjhauta Express bombings: Terrorist explosions on the international Samjhauta Express near the Indian city of Panipat kill 68.
- (United Kingdom) February 23 – Grayrigg derailment: A Virgin Trains West Coast services travelling from London Euston to Glasgow Central derails in Cumbria in North-West England due to an inadequate points maintenance regime by Network Rail; one elderly woman dies in hospital as a result of her injuries.
- February 26 – The United States Federal Railroad Administration delivers its decision to deny a US$2.3 billion loan request made by Dakota, Minnesota and Eastern Railroad (DME).

=== March events ===
- (South Korea) March 16 – Phase three of Incheon Subway Line 1 opens from Gyulhyeon to Gyeyang.
- (Japan) March 18 – Opening of the Sendai Airport Line in Sendai.
- (South Korea) March 23 – Opening of the first phase of the Airport Railroad Express (AREX) between Seoul-Incheon and Gimpo airports (37.6 km (23.4 mi)).
- March 25 – The rebuilt Takahatafudō Station, serving the Keiō Line and the Tama Toshi Monorail Line in Japan opens.
- (Japan) March 31
  - Final day of operations on the Kurihara Railway in Miyagi Prefecture.
  - Final day of railway operations on the Kashima Railway in Ibaraki Prefecture; the company continues to operate as a holding company wholly owned by the Kanto Railway Company.
  - Final day of operation on the Nishitetsu Kaizuka Line between Nishitetsu Shingu and Tsuyazaki.

=== April events ===
- (France) April 3 – The French TGV sets a new train speed record. The train reached 574.8 km/h (357.2 mph).
- (United States) April 7 – Weekday service begins on T Third Street light-rail line in San Francisco, leading to massive delays in the San Francisco Municipal Railway.
- (South Korea) April 17 – Phase 2 of Daejeon Metro Line 1 opens for service between Government Complex, Daejeon and Banseok.
- April 23 – Trial runs on 250 km long Eskişehir-Ankara part of 533 km long High-speed train line from Istanbul (Turkey's largest metropolis) to Ankara (capital of Turkey) began.
- (United States) April 23 – Construction begins on the Second Avenue Subway in New York City between 63rd and 105th streets, a resumption of a decades-long project with existing segments elsewhere.
- (Canada) April 28 – The Orange Line of Montreal Metro is extended 5.2 km to Montmorency in Laval.

=== May events ===
- May 17 – Official reinauguration of rail services between Dorasan (South Korea) and Kaesong Industrial Region (North Korea).

=== June events ===
- (France) (Austria) June 8 – Last Orient Express through overnight service from Paris to Vienna runs.
- June 10 – The first section of LGV Est, a high-speed rail line, opens in France. This coincides with improvements to the German rail network to cut travel times from Paris to Eastern France and Germany.
- (Switzerland) June 15 – Revenue freight traffic starts to use the Lötschberg Base Tunnel in the Swiss Alps.
- (China) June 28 – Guangzhou Metro's Line 4 extension connecting Huangge to Jinzhou opens.
- (Australia) June – $20m allocated for planning and land acquisition for the proposed Australian Inland Railway.

=== July events ===
- July 1 – Kampac Oil of Dubai, as consortium leader, is awarded a construction and operation contract for a new railway line in Ghana connecting Takoradi 800 kilometres (500 mi) to Hamile. The contract, valued at US$1.6 billion, also includes the rehabilitation of a line between Takoradi and Kumasi as part of the Ghanaian government's plans to connect to northern Ghana.
- (Japan) July 1 – The first timetabled run of N700 Series Shinkansen high-speed train.
- (United Kingdom) July 18 – Metronet, holder of the maintenance contract for a majority of the London Underground lines, seeks authority of the Mayor of London to go into administration following a dispute about responsibility for cost overruns on its contract.

=== August events ===
- (Russia) August 30 – Trubnaya station opened on Moscow Metro.

=== September events ===
- (United States) September – Tunneling for East Side Access in New York begins.

=== October events ===
- October 1 – Ferrovías Guatemala (subsidiary of Railroad Development Corporation) suspends all operations.
- (Australia) October 15 – The William Street tunnel opens as the first stage of Transperth's Mandurah line
- (United States) October 31 – MBTA Commuter Rail Greenbush Line opens in Massachusetts.
- (United Kingdom) – Last publication of the monthly OAG Rail Guide, successor to the ABC Rail Guide timetable of 1853.

=== November events ===
- (Belarus) November 7 – Minsk Metro Maskoŭskaja line gets extended to Uruchye.
- (United Kingdom) November 11 – West Midlands train operating company franchise is taken over from Silverlink and Central Trains by London Midland (a Govia company) and the East Midlands franchise from Midland Mainline and Central Trains by East Midlands Trains. National Express is the principal loser in these changes. Arriva CrossCountry takes over a revised CrossCountry franchise from Virgin CrossCountry. London Overground Rail Operations commences operation, effectively returning the lines involved to public control.

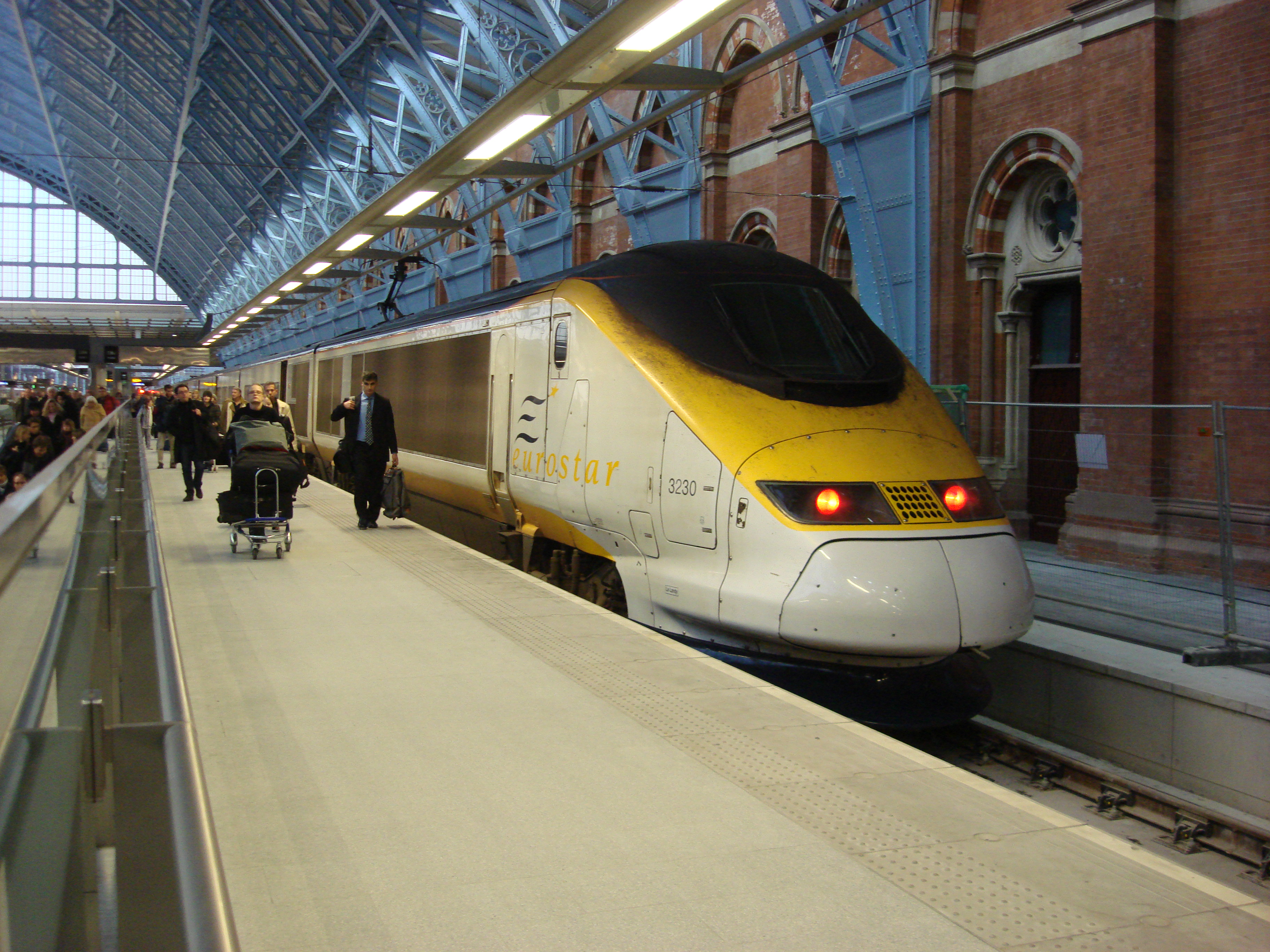
Eurostar at St Pancras International following opening of High Speed 1

- November 13 – Strikes in France begin to disrupt SNCF and Paris Metro service.
- (United Kingdom) November 14 – High Speed 1 is opened with public passenger services into rebuilt St Pancras International.
- (Germany) November 14 – Gewerkschaft Deutscher Lokomotivführer (GDL, or German Train Drivers' Union) engages in a national three-day strike against Deutsche Bahn.
- (United States) November 26 – LYNX light-rail service begins in Charlotte, North Carolina.

=== December events ===
- (Hong Kong) December 2 – Two railway companies, the MTR Corporation and the Kowloon-Canton Railway Corporation are merged.
- (United Kingdom) December 9 – National Express East Coast takes over the British InterCity East Coast train operating franchise from GNER.
- December 11 – freight service to resume between South Korea and North Korea.
- (Switzerland) December 12 – NBS Mattstetten–Rothrist line converted to the first Swiss high-speed line, being a part of strategic plan Rail 2000 with detailed longer-term projects.
- (United Kingdom) December 18 – Grand Central, a new rail operator in England, inaugurates passenger services from Sunderland to London King's Cross.
- (Republic of Ireland) December 19 – The IE 22000 Class Diesel Multiple Unit enters service on Intercity routes in Ireland.
- (Australia) December 23 – The Mandurah line opens as an extension to Transperth's rail network.
- December 23 – The Madrid–Valladolid high-speed rail line opens to passengers in Spain, including the 28 kilometres (17 mi) Guadarrama Tunnel, the fourth longest railway tunnel in Europe.
- (Russia) December 24 – Moscow Metro Arbatsko-Pokrovskaya Line gets extended from Park Pobedy to Strogino.
- (Russia) December 29 – Sretensky Bulvar station opened on the Lyublinskaya Line of Moscow Metro.
- (Switzerland) – Regular passenger-train service begins in the Lötschberg Base Tunnel in the Swiss Alps.

=== Unknown date events ===
- (United States) – The Dakota, Minnesota & Eastern Railroad expects to complete construction on the railroad's expansion into Wyoming's Powder River Basin.
- – Construction is expected to begin on a new rail link between India and Bhutan.
- (Japan) – JR Central phases out 113 series.

== Accidents ==
- (United States) January 7 – A Washington Metro train derails near downtown Washington, D.C., sending 16 people to the hospital and prompting the rescue of 60 people from a tunnel.
- (India) February 18 – 2007 Samjhauta Express bombings, a terrorist attack on the Samjhauta Express near the Indian city of Panipat, 80 kilometres (50 mi) north of New Delhi; sixty-eight people are killed.
- (United Kingdom) February 23 – Grayrigg derailment: A Virgin Trains West Coast services travelling from London Euston to Glasgow Central derails on faulty points in Cumbria in North-West England. One elderly woman dies in hospital as a result of her injuries.
- (United States) May 23 – during the early morning hours, a BNSF Railway switching crew jumped off the locomotive after hearing reports of 34 runaway tank cars loaded with beer charging into Denver's 33rd Street Yard at 40 mph, later slamming into the locomotives and causing substantial damage. The crew were uninjured. The cause was negligence from the crew of another yard leaving the handbrake or airbrakes released.
- June 5 – Kerang train crash: Eleven people die in a level crossing collision near Kerang, Victoria, Australia.
- (United Kingdom) June 12 – A train on the Atlantic Coast Line in Cornwall collides with a car at Chapel level crossing, on the outskirts of Newquay.
- (China) July 15 – In Shanghai, platform-edge doors cause a fatal accident. when a man tries to force his way onto a crowded train at the station for the Shanghai Indoor Stadium, but failes. When the doors close, he is trapped between the platform doors and the train, leading to his death.
- (Democratic Republic of the Congo) August 1 – The Benaleka train crash in the Democratic Republic of Congo kills over 100.
- December 19 – Mehrabpur train derailment occurs near Mehrabpur in Pakistan killing 40.

== Deaths ==
=== February deaths ===
- February 23 – Robert W. Richardson, American railroad historian, dies (b. 1910).

=== August deaths ===
- August 9 – Walter Rich, Chairman of Delaware Otsego Corporation, New York, Susquehanna & Western Railroad and Central New York Railroad (b. 1946).

=== December deaths ===
- December 24 – George Warrington, president of Amtrak 1998–2002, executive director of New Jersey Transit 2002–2007 (b. 1952).

== Industry awards ==
=== Japan ===
Awards presented by Japan Railfan Club

- 2007 Blue Ribbon Award: Toyama Light Rail 0600 series "Portram"
- 2007 Laurel Prize: JR East E233 series EMU and Nishi-Nippon Railroad 3000 series EMU

=== North America ===
2007 E. H. Harriman Awards

Group	Gold medal	Silver medal	Bronze medal
A	Norfolk Southern	CSX	BNSF
B	Kansas City Southern Railway	Canadian Pacific's United States subsidiary	Long Island Rail Road
C	Florida East Coast Railway	Central Oregon & Pacific Railroad	BNSF Suburban Operation in Chicago
S&T	Birmingham Southern Railroad	Conrail	Terminal Railroad Association of St Louis

Awards presented by Railway Age magazine

- 2007 Railroader of the Year: Bill Wimmer (UP)
- 2007 Regional Railroad of the Year: South Kansas and Oklahoma Railroad (SKOL)
- 2007 Short Line Railroad of the Year: RJ Corman West Virginia Lines

=== United Kingdom ===
Train Operator of the Year

- 2007: Eurostar
