= Ghana Railway Company =

Public company of Ghana

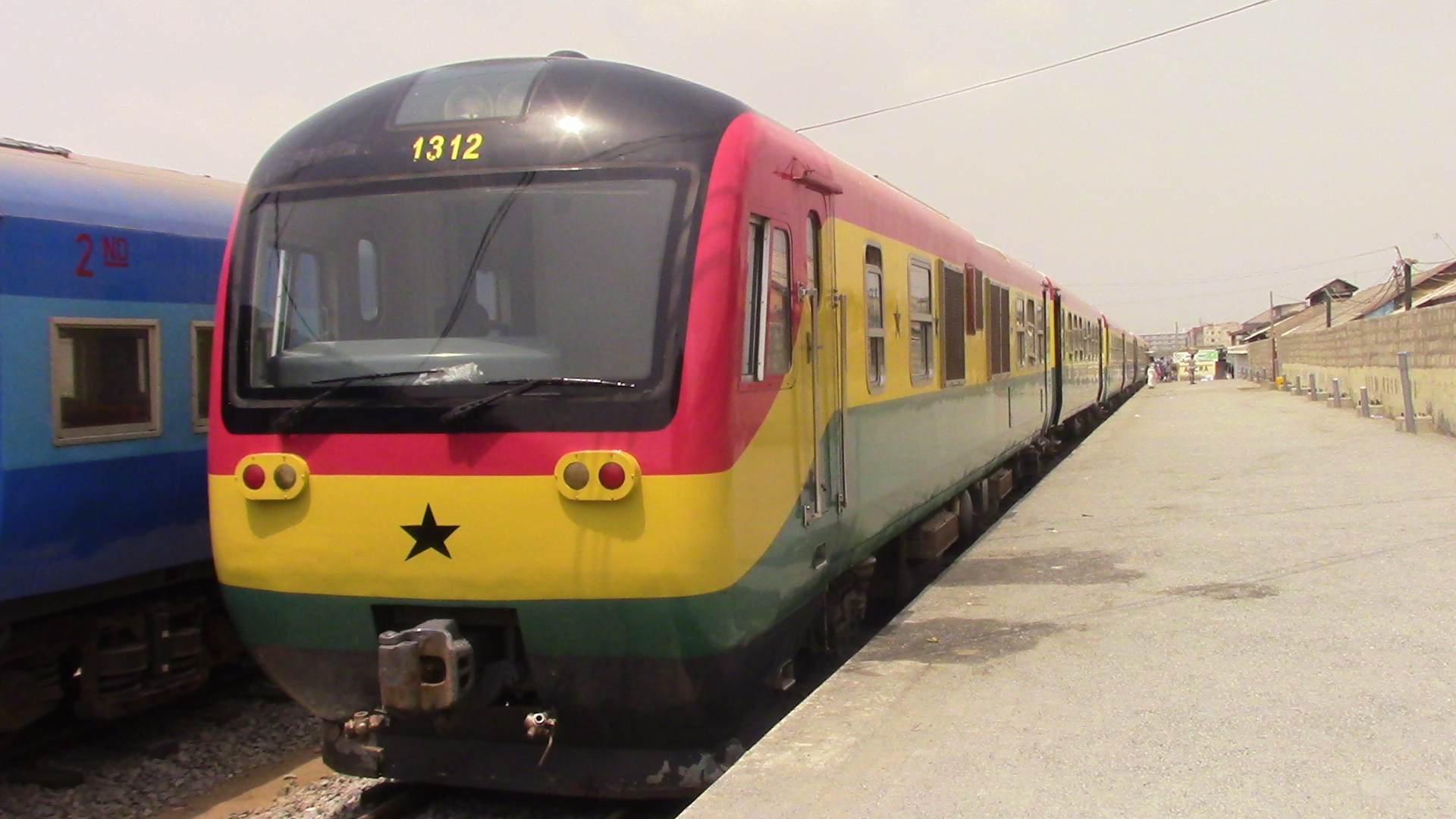
Ghana Railways 1300 series DMU at the Accra train station

Railway network of Ghana

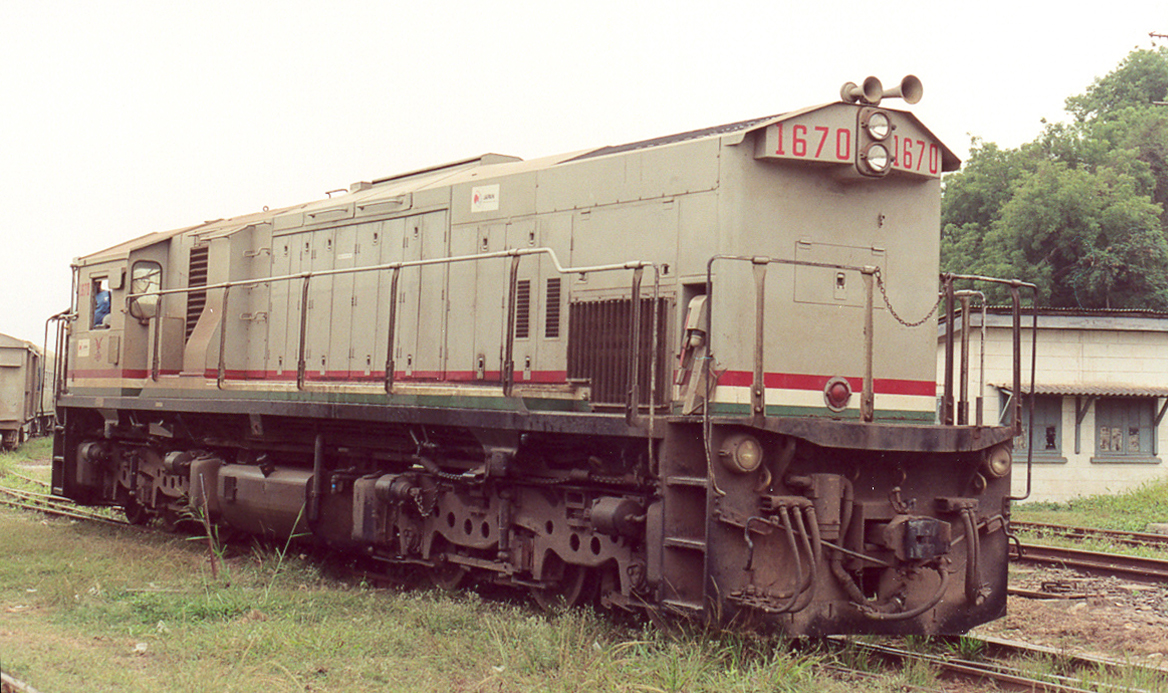
Ghana Railways #1670 in Kumasi. #1670 is a GMDD (General Motors Diesel Division, London, Ontario, Canada) model GT18LC-2, 6-axle, 1,500 horsepower, diesel-electric locomotive, part of an order of 15 ordered in 1995. (GMDD is a division of EMD, formerly a subsidiary of General Motors Corporation.) It has an EMD 8-645 2-stroke diesel engine as prime-mover. Couplers are AAR coupling and air brakes. (Not known if this locomotive is A1A or Co-Co.) Locomotive can't be mu'd.

The Ghana Railway Company Limited (previously known as the Ghana Railway Corporation) is the company that operates the railways of Ghana. The Ghana Railway Company Limited is a public-sector body with responsibility for the efficient management of the national rail system so as to enhance the smooth movement of goods and passengers.

== History ==
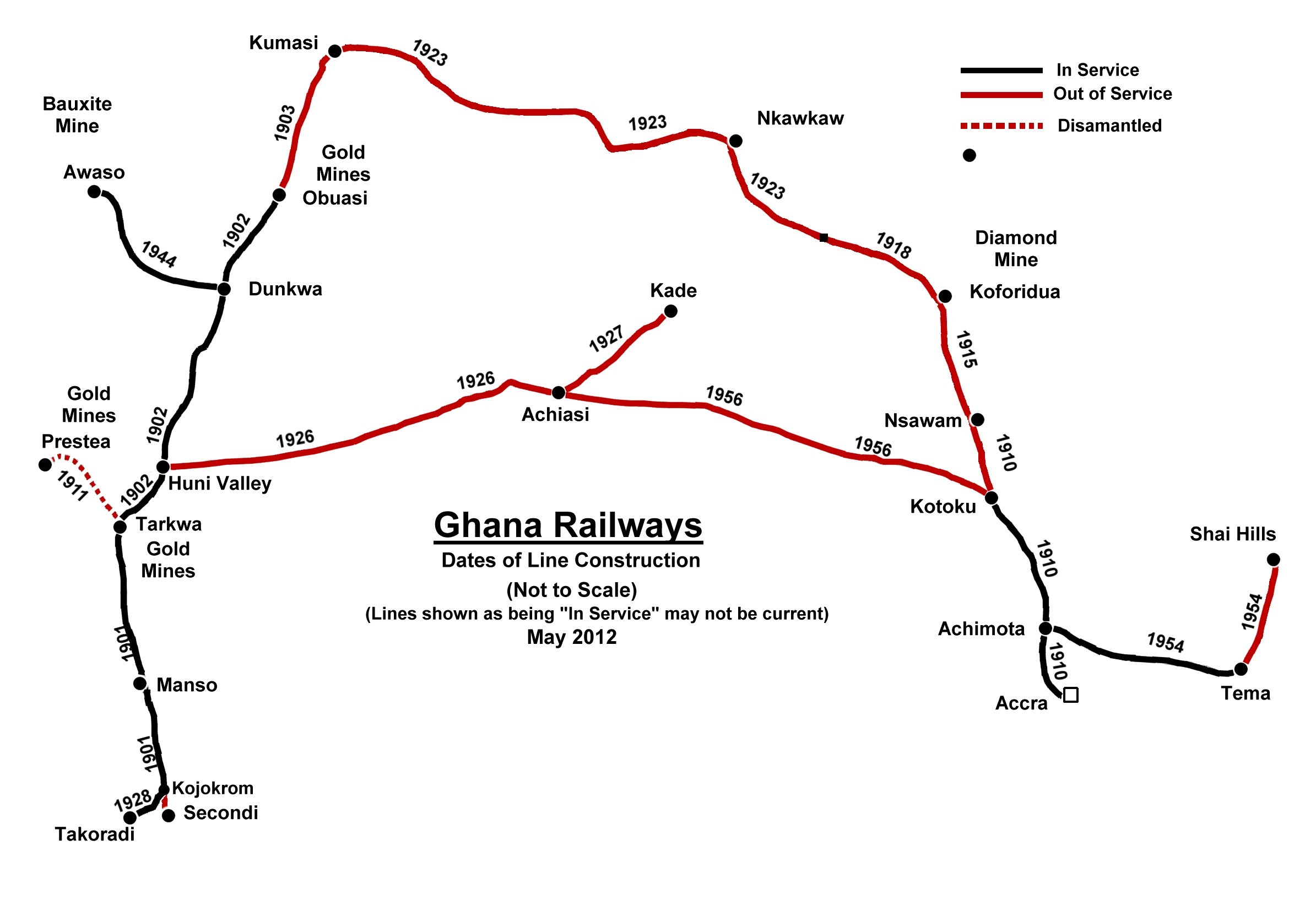
Railway map of Ghana showing dates of construction

Operations began in 1898 under the Gold Coast Government Railways with headquarters in Sekondi. The headquarters were transferred to Takoradi after the building of Takoradi Harbour, and railways and ports were jointly administered as the Ghana Railway & Ports Authority. In 1976, SMCD 95 separated the railway from ports as the Ghana Railway Corporation. The company enjoyed the status of a public corporation until 19 March 2001, when it became a limited liability company.

The original 304-kilometre (189 mi) Eastern Railway was built in 1923 by the British for the purpose of hauling minerals and cocoa. Construction of the Ghana Railways started before there were any port facilities, and locomotives and other equipment had to be lightered over the beach.

In July 2007, contract signed as part of the ECOWAS rail plan, intended to link Ghana to Burkina Faso.

- In February, a Korean engineering study group examined the proposed new lines and also gauge conversion from 1,067 mm (3 ft 6 in) to 1,435 mm (4 ft 8 1/2 in) (standard gauge).

In 2008 two diesel multiple units ordered from China CNR Corporation's Tangshan plant for a shuttle service from Accra to Tema. Each unit comprises two motor cars with Vossloh Kiepe and Voith traction equipment, plus four trailer cars.

In October 2010 the DMUs were launched. The line was commissioned in October 2010; in December 2010, work began on an extension to Tema harbour.

In 2010, a contract was signed to construct a railway from Paga (on the border with Burkina Faso) to Kumasi; plus a branch from Tamale to Yendi.

The railway network in Ghana resembles a large capital "A" with 3 components - a "Western Division" (the left leg of the "A") from Secondi/Takoradi to Kumasi (280 km, 168 mi), an "Eastern Division" (the right leg of the "A") from Accra to Kumasi, and a "Central Division" (the horizontal bar of the "A") from Huni Valley to Kotoku. The 953 km (570 mi) network includes branch lines on the "Western Division" to Prestea and Awaso, a branch line to Kade on the "Central Division", and branch lines to Tema and Shai Hills on the "Eastern Division".

Very little of the railway network remains in operation. Accra to Tema, Accra to Kotoku, and Awaso to Dunkwa and south to Takoradi are the only parts that are known to be in operation. Very little is known about the current operating state of the rest of the system.

The following table outlines the dates of construction of the various parts of the railway network. (See map below right.)

Date	Western Division	Date	Eastern Division	Date	Central Division
1901	Secondi to Tarkwa	1910	Accra to Achimota	1926	Huni Valley (Tinkrakrom)(4) to Achiasi
1902	Tarkwa to Huni Valley	1910	Achimota to Nswam	1927	Achiasi to Kade (5)
1902	Huni Valley to Obwasi	1915	Nswam to Koforidua	1956	Achiasi to Kotoku (6)
1903	Obwasi to Kumasi	1918	Koforidua to Tafo		
1911	Tarkwa to Prestea (1)	1923	Tafo to Kumasi		
1928	Takoradi to Kojokrom (2)	1954	Achimoto to Tema		
1944	Dunkwa to Awaso (3)	1954	Tema to Shai Hills		

Note 1 - Tarkwa to Prestea is a branch line on the Western Division that services manganese mines.

Note 2 - Kojokrom is the junction of the line to Secondi (now abandoned). The other leg serves the port of Takoradi.

Note 3 - Dunkwa to Awaso is a branch line on the Western Division that services bauxite mines.

Note 4 - Huni Valley (Tinkwakrom) is the junction of the Central Division with the Western Division.

Note 5 - Achiasi to Kade is now a branch line on the Central Division. It used to service timber companies and for cocoa transportation. Oda was an important station on this branch.

Note 6 - Kotoku is the junction of the Central Division with the Eastern Division.

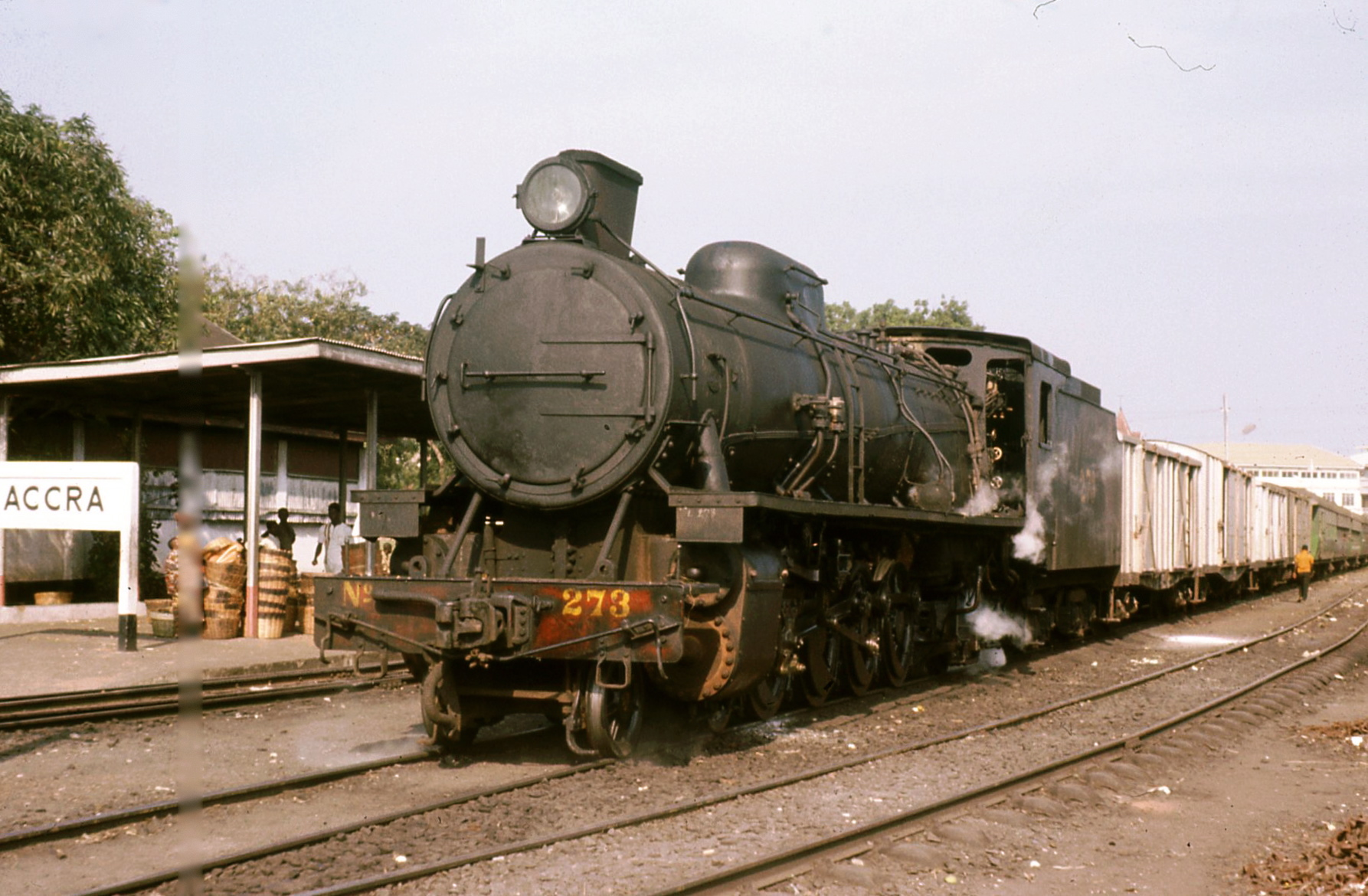
British-built 4-8-2 oil-burning locomotive waits to leave Accra on mixed overnight train in July 1974.

== Stations ==
The following table lists some of the stations and flagstops (halts) that existed at one time on the three Divisions. There may be more. In the latter days of operation on these lines, very few of them were in service.

Stations On Western Division	.	.	.	Stations on Central Division	.	.	.	Stations on Eastern Division	.	.
Station	Milepost	Flagstop	.	Station	Milepost	Flagstop	.	Station	Milepost	Flagstop
TAKORADI	167.0.0	.	.	HUNI VALLEY (Jct)	0.0	.	.	Accra	0.0	.
Butuah	.	.	.	Damang	5.75	.	.	Achimota (Jct)	5.5	.
Efia Nkwanta	.	.	.	Subri	12.75	.	.	Dome	7.5	.
Kojokrom (Jct)	160.75	.	.	Sapongso	.	.	.	Ofako	.	.
Inchaban Junction	159.25	.	.	Nyenasi	25.5	.	.	Pokoasi	.	.
Ashiam	.	.	.	Twifu Praso	29.75	.	.	Amasaman	14.5	.
Angu	153.0	.	.	Nuamakrom	36.25	.	.	Opa	.	.
Manso	146.75	.	.	Ongwa	41.0	.	.	Ajenkotoku (Jct)	19.5	.
Benso	140.25	.	.	Adeenimbra	45.5	.	.	Papasi	21.75	.
Esuaso	135.75	.	.	Foso	51.0.	.	.	Chinto	.	.
Bonsawire	132.25	.	.	Akenkaso	60.5	.	.	NSAWAM	26.0	.
Nsuta	128.0	.	.	Aperade	67.5	.	.	Oparekrom	.	.
TARKWA	124.5	.	.	Nyankumasi	.	.	.	Buokrom	.	.
Aboso	119.5	.	.	ACHIASI (Jct)	75.25	.	.	Pakra	33.5	.
Bompieso	114.0	.	.	.Osorasi	79.5	.	.	Mangousi	37.75	.
HUNI VALLEY (Tinkwakrom)	110.5	.	.	Adimsov	86	.	.	Nsukrame Halt	.	.
Kuranti	105.75	.	.	Moffram	93.5	.	.	Aboabo Halt	.	.
Insu	100.25	.	.	Badukrom	.	.	.	Asuoya	43.0	.
Gymakrom	.	.	.	Akroso	93.5	.	.	Kantakerri Halt	.	.
Oppon Valley	90.0	.	.	Kumikrom	99.5	.	.	Nsempoamiensa Halt	.	.
DUNKWA	64.25	.	.	Kofikyere	.	.	.	Koforidua	50.25	.
Ampunyase	57.0	.	.	Krodua	106.0	.	.	Affidwase	.	.
Akrofuom	49.5	.	.	Danso	113.0	.	.	Oyoko	.	.
Obuasi	42.25	.	.	Adaiso	119.0	.	.	Jumapo	56.5	.
Akrokerri	33.5	,	.	Ajenkotoku (Jct)	124.5	.	.	Tafo	63.0	.
Kanseri	26.25	.	.	.	.	.	.	Bosusuo.	69.75	.
Bekwai	19.25	.	.	.	.	.	.	Osino	76.5	.
Eduaben	9.0	.	.	.	.	.	.	Anyinam	83.0	.
KUMASI	0.0	.	.	.	.	.	.	Ankaasi.	.	.
.	.	.	.	.	.	.	.	Enyiresi	.	.
.	.	.	.	.	.	.	.	Kankang	89.25	.
.	.	.	.	.	.	.	.	Jejeti	95.5	.
.	.	.	.	.	.	.	.	Asubon	101.0	.
.	.	.	.	.	.	.	.	Nkawkaw	108.25	.
.	.	.	.	.	.	.	.	Awenadi	.	.
.	.	.	.	.	.	.	.	Kwahu Praso	122.75	.
.	.	.	.	.	.	.	.	Pra River	127.75	.
.	.	.	.	.	.	.	.	Bompatu	.	.
.	.	.	.	.	.	.	.	Juaso	144.75	.
.	.	.	.	.	.	.	.	Konuogo	152.0	.
.	.	.	.	.	.	.	.	Bomfa	159.0	.
.	.	.	.	.	.	.	.	Odumasi	153.5	.
.	.	.	.	.	.	.	.	Buamadumasi.	163.75	.
.	.	.	.	.	.	.	.	Ahwiriso	167.0.	.
.	.	.	.	.	.	.	.	Boankra	171.25	.
.	.	.	.	.	.	.	.	Ejisi	176.0	.
.	.	.	.	.	.	.	.	Fumisua	180,5	.
.	.	.	.	.	.	.	.	Kumasi Market	188.75	.
.	.	.	.	.	.	.	.	KUMASI	189.5	.

Note 1 - No passenger service.

Note 2 -

Note 3 - Station/stop may no longer be in service.

== Standards ==
- Railway coupling - AAR coupler
- Brake (railway) - Air brake
- axleload - 25T

== Single and double track ==
The system is single-track with the exception of about 30 km (19 mi) of double track between Takoradi and Manso on the Western Line.

== Gauge ==
Railway gauge is currently 1,067 mm (3 ft 6 in). The latest proposals in 2006 for upgrade and expansion include conversion of 1,067 mm (3 ft 6 in) (narrow gauge) to 1,435 mm (4 ft 8 1/2 in) (standard gauge). As an interim position, dual gauge sleepers are being installed to facilitate the conversion to Standard Gauge.

== Concession ==
In 2007 a consortium led by Dubai-based Kampac Oil Co signed a US$1.6 billion concession to develop the 1,067 mm (3 ft 6 in) (Cape gauge) Western Railway. Over five years a 500-kilometre (310 mi) line is to be constructed from Awaso to Hamile near the border with Burkina Faso. The government awarded a US$1.4 billion concession for the Eastern Railway to Peatrack earlier in the year.

== New suburban services ==
In March 2015 it was announced that a new suburban service linking Sekondi and Takoradi would begin by the end of 2015. The US$100 million project, managed by Amanda Holdings, involves the rebuilding of 30 of 1067mm gauge track to standard gauge, and the acquisition of two DMUs for service. The Accra - Nsawam and Kumasi - Ejisu suburban lines are also to be rebuilt.

The Tema-Mpakadan railway line which includes a bridge across the Lake Volta opened in 2023.

In September 2022 GRC ordered two DMU from Pesa with option on ten additional. The first DMU based class 847 for CDs ass number 001 was completed in January 2024, and on February 2 of the same year, the vehicle was presented at the Bydgoszcz Główna station. Amongst the participants was the Secretary of State and the President of the Ghana Railway Development Agency, Yaw Owusu.

In September 2024, the second vehicle, which is a type Link, was completed. On the night of September 26–27, the vehicle was shipped by sea to the recipient.

== Concrete sleepers ==
A plant to manufacture concrete sleepers is to be set up in 2008 at the strategic railway junction at Huni Valley.

== Rolling stock ==
- Ghana Railways 1301–1306 and 1307–1312 series
- Pesa 847 series
- Pesa Link
- Class 56

== See also ==
- Rail transport in Ghana
- Transport in Ghana
