= Omanpe =

Coordinates: 05°36′00″N 02°44′00″W

Omanpe (also spelled Omape) is a town in western Ghana near the border with Côte d'Ivoire. It lies some distance from the coast.

The town is part of the Western Region.
