= Accra Central Station =

Railway Station in Accra

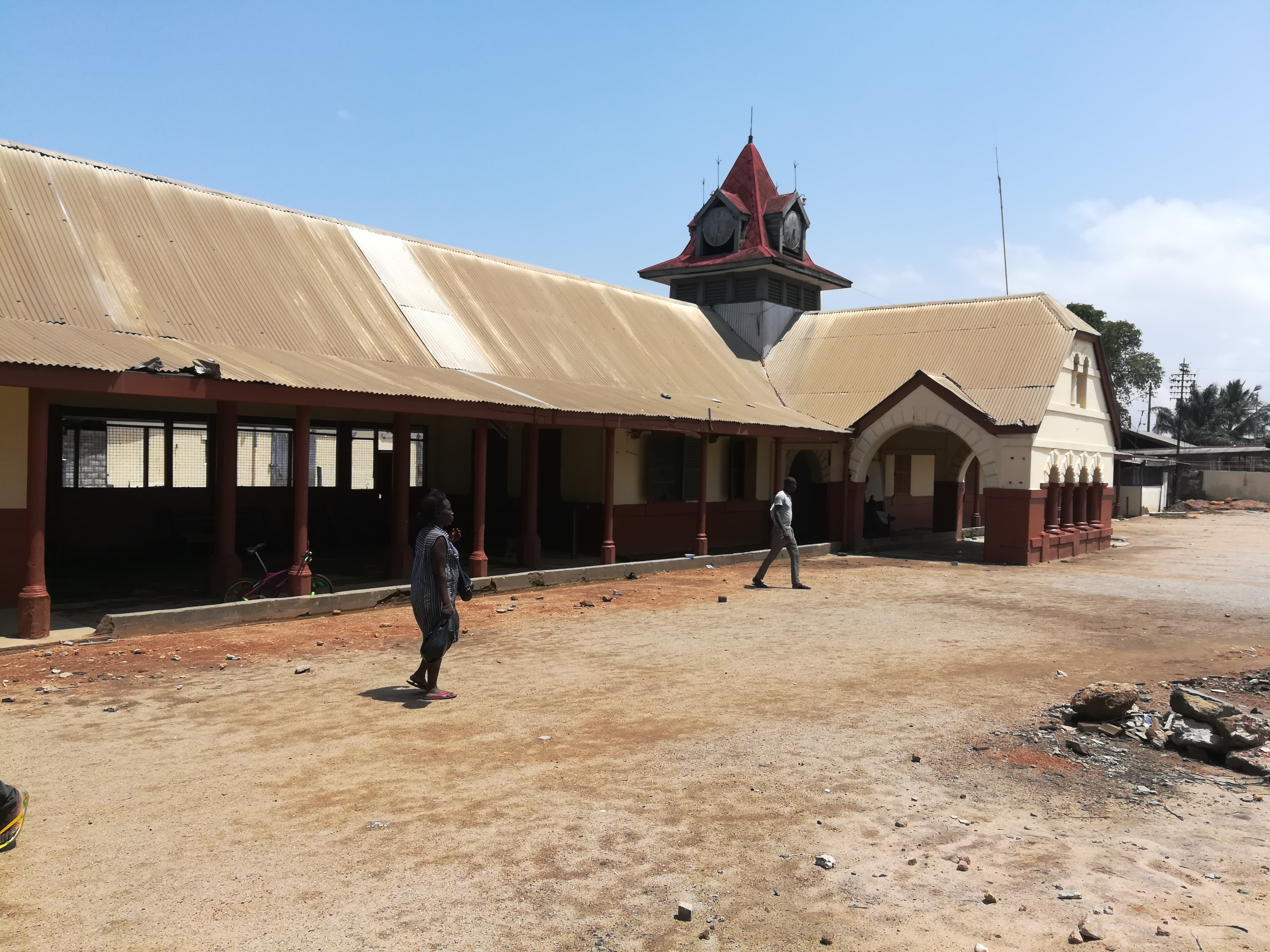
- The station in 2019

General information
- Location: Ghana
- Coordinates: 5.5487°N 0.2109°W
- Operator: Ghana Railway Corporation

History
- Opened: 1910
Location

Accra Central Station is the main railway station in Accra, the capital of Ghana.

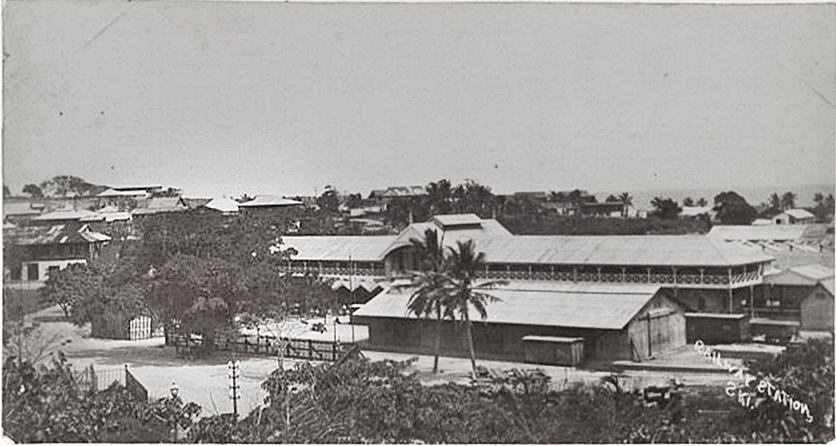
The station in 1914

The station was completed in 1910, to serve the new Accra to Mangoase line, with railway offices built nearby. Prior to its construction, the area was a marshy valley. The line was steadily extended, and reached Kumasi in 1923. As a single track leads north from the station, capacity was a problem, but the station was not reconstructed, and from the 1950s, traffic began to decline.

By 2011, the station had no service; it was instead used by market traders, while some people used abandoned trains as housing. In January 2019, a new once-daily service to Tema was introduced.
