= Awaso =

- Village
- Location in Ghana
- Coordinates: 6°14′0″N 2°16′0″W
- Country: Ghana
- Region: Western North Region
- District: Bibiani-Anhwiaso-Bekwai Municipal District
- Time zone: GMT
  - Summer (DST): GMT

Awaso is a village near the district capital Bibiani of Bibiani-Anhwiaso-Bekwai Municipal district, a district in the Western North Region of Ghana. Awaso has a bauxite mine operated by the Ghana Bauxite Company. The mine is served by a rail branch line on the western Ghana rail system, however in 2007, much of the ore goes by road.

== See also ==
- Railway stations in Ghana
