= Hamile =

- Town
- Location of Hamile in Ghana
- Coordinates: 10°59′0″N 2°44′0″W
- Country: Ghana

Population (2013)
  - Total: —
- Time zone: GMT
  - Summer (DST): GMT

Hamile is a village in the northwestern corner of the Republic of Ghana, close to the border with Burkina Faso.

== Transport ==
In July 2007, contracts were made for the construction of a railway extension in the village of Hamile. There is a 88.5 km highway from Wa-Hamile.

== Facilities ==
- Hamile Border Post
- Hamile Truck Park
