= Imperial German Army =

Land warfare branch of the German Empire

German Army
- Deutsches Heer
- Standard of the Emperor

- Reichskriegsflagge
- Motto: Gott mit uns
- Founded: 16 April 1871; 155 years ago
- Disbanded: 6 March 1919; 107 years ago
- Service branches: Heer (army); Schutztruppe (colonial troops); Luftstreitkräfte (air force); Abteilung III b (counterintelligence)
- Headquarters: Großes Hauptquartier 52°31′N 13°22′E

Leadership
- Commander-in-chief: German Emperor(1871–1918); President of the Reich(1918–1919)
- Governing body: General Staff: Supreme Army Command (1916–1919)
- Chief of the General Staff: Moltke the Elder (first); Hans von Seeckt (last)

Personnel
- Military age: 17–45
- Conscription: 2–3 years; compulsory service
- Active personnel: 14,250,000+ (total served) See full list: Abushiri Revolt; Hehe Rebellion; Bafut Wars; Battle of Adibo; Boxer Rebellion; Adamawa Wars; Kavango Uprising; Herero Wars; Maji Maji Rebellion; Sokehs Rebellion; World War I; Finnish Civil War; Ukrainian War of Independence; Greater Poland Uprising; German Revolution

Expenditure
- Budget: US$45 billion (total; 1914–18) (US$1.3 trillion in 2022)

Related articles
- History: Germany during World War I
- Ranks: German military ranks

The Imperial German Army (1871–1919), officially referred to as the German Army (German: Deutsches Heer), was the unified ground and air force of the German Empire. It was established in 1871 with the political unification of Germany under the leadership of Prussia, and was dissolved in 1919, after the defeat of the German Empire in World War I (1914–1918). In the Federal Republic of Germany, the term Deutsches Heer refers to the German Army, the land component of the Bundeswehr.

== Formation and name ==
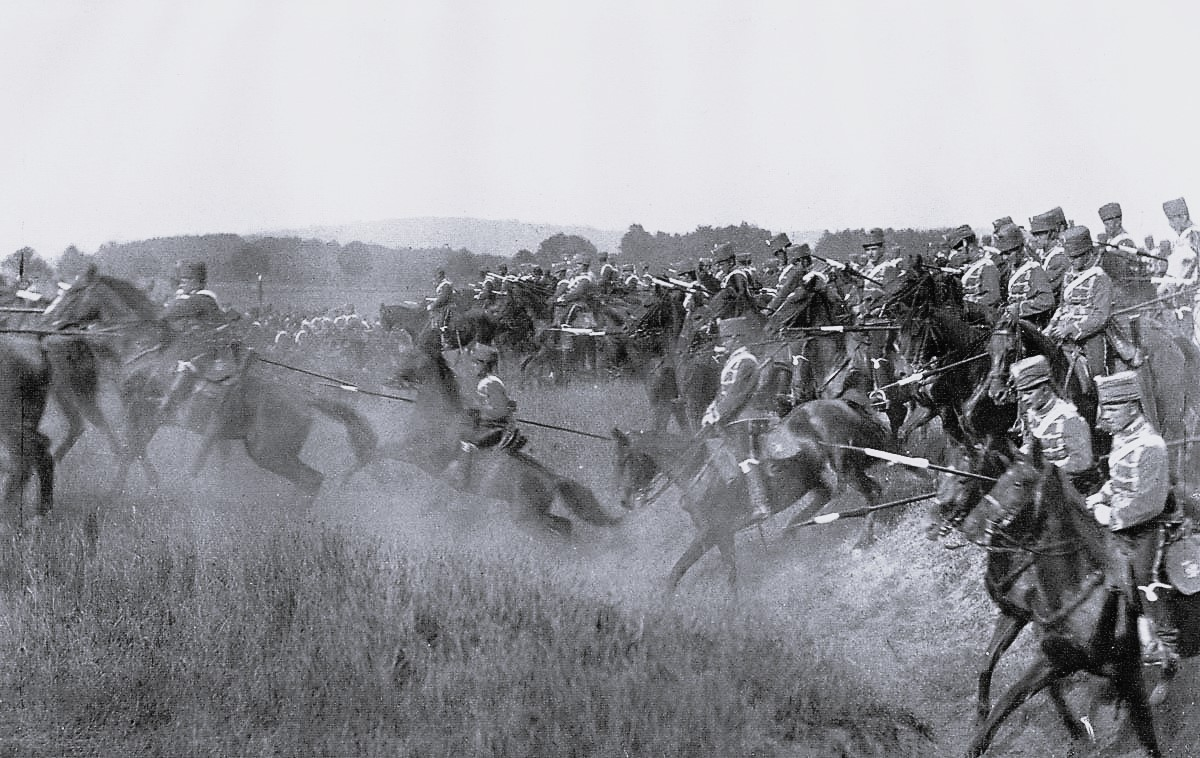
German Army hussars on the attack during maneuvers, 1912

The states that made up the German Empire contributed their armies; within the German Confederation, formed after the Napoleonic Wars, each state was responsible for maintaining certain units to be put at the disposal of the Confederation in case of conflict. When operating together, the units were known as the Federal Army (Bundesheer). The Federal Army system functioned during various conflicts of the 19th century, such as the First Schleswig War from 1848 to 1852. However, by the time of the Second Schleswig War of 1864, tension had grown between the main powers of the confederation, the Austrian Empire and the Kingdom of Prussia, and the German Confederation was dissolved after the Austro-Prussian War of 1866.

Prussia formed the North German Confederation and the treaty provided for the maintenance of a Federal Army and a Federal Navy (Bundesmarine or Bundeskriegsmarine). Further laws on military duty also used these terms. Conventions (some later amended) were entered into between the North German Confederation and its member states, subordinating their armies to the Prussian Army in time of war, and giving the Prussian Army control over training, doctrine, and equipment. (Note: The conventions were: Militärkonvention zwischen dem Norddeutschen Bunde (bzw. Preußen) und Sachsen vom 7. Februar 1867; Militärkonvention zwischen dem Norddeutschen Bunde und Hessen vom 13. Juni 1871 (Ersatz für die vom 7. April 1867); Militärkonvention zwischen dem Norddeutschen Bunde und Mecklenburg-Schwerin vom 19. Dezember 1872 (Ersatz für die von 24. Juni 1868); Militärkonvention zwischen dem Norddeutschen Bunde und Mecklenburg-Strelitz vom 23. Dezember 1872 (Ersatz für die vom 9. November 1867); Militärkonvention zwischen dem Norddeutschen Bunde und Oldenburg vom 15. Juni 1867; Militärkonvention zwischen dem Norddeutschen Bunde und Braunschweig vom 9./18. März 1886; Militärkonvention zwischen dem Norddeutschen Bunde einerseits und Sachsen-Weimar-Eisenach, Sachsen-Altenburg, Sachsen-Coburg-Gotha, Sachsen-Meiningen, Reuß ältere Linie, Reuß jüngere Linie und Schwarzburg-Rudolstadt vom 15. September 1873; Militärkonvention zwischen dem Norddeutschen Bunde und Anhalt vom 16. September 1873 (Ersatz für die vom 28. Juni 1867); Militärkonvention zwischen dem Norddeutschen Bunde und Schwarzburg-Sondershausen vom 17. September 1873 (Ersatz für die vom 28. Juni 1867); Militärkonvention zwischen dem Norddeutschen Bunde und Lippe vom 14. November 1873 (Ersatz für die vom 26. Juni 1867); Militärkonvention zwischen dem Norddeutschen Bunde und Schaumburg-Lippe vom 25. September 1873 (Ersatz für die vom 30. Juni 1867); Militärkonvention zwischen dem Norddeutschen Bunde und Waldeck vom 24. November 1877 (Ersatz für die vom 6. August 1867); Militärkonvention zwischen dem Norddeutschen Bunde und Lübeck vom 27. Juni 1867; Militärkonvention zwischen dem Norddeutschen Bunde und Bremen vom 27. Juni 1867; Militärkonvention zwischen dem Norddeutschen Bunde und Hamburg vom 23. Juli 1867)

Shortly after the outbreak of the Franco-Prussian War in 1870, the North German Confederation also entered into conventions on military matters with states that were not members of the confederation, namely Bavaria, Württemberg, and Baden. (Note: The conventions were: Artikel III. § 5 of the Bundesvertrag vom 23. November 1870 mit Bayern; Militärkonvention zwischen dem Norddeutschen Bunde und Baden vom 25. November 1870; Militärkonvention zwischen dem Norddeutschen Bunde und Württemberg vom 25. November 1870) Through these conventions and the 1871 Constitution of the German Empire, an Army of the Realm (Reichsheer) was created. The Constitution of the German Empire, dated April 16, 1871, changed references in the North German Constitution from Federal Army to either Army of the Realm (Reichsheer) or German Army (Deutsches Heer).

The contingents of the Bavarian, Saxon, and Württemberg kingdoms remained semi-autonomous, while the Prussian Army assumed almost total control over the armies of the other states of the Empire. After 1871, the peacetime armies of the four kingdoms remained relatively distinct. The term "German Army" was used in various legal documents, such as the Military Penal Code, but otherwise, the Prussian, Bavarian, Saxon, and Württemberg armies maintained their distinct identities. Each kingdom had its own War Ministry, Bavaria and Saxony published their own rank and seniority lists for their officers and the Württemberg list was a separate chapter of the Prussian Army rank lists. Württemberg and Saxon units were numbered according to the Prussian system but Bavarian units maintained their own numbers (the 2nd Württemberg Infantry Regiment was Infantry Regiment No. 120 under the Prussian system).

== Command ==
The commander of the Imperial German Army, less the Bavarian contingent, was the Kaiser. He was assisted by a Military Cabinet and exercised control through the Prussian Ministry of War and the Great General Staff. The Chief of the General Staff became the Kaiser's main military adviser and the most powerful military figure in the empire. Bavaria kept its own Ministry of War and General Staff, but coordinated planning with the Prussian General Staff. Saxony also maintained its own Ministry of War and General Staff, and the Ministry of War of Württemberg and General Staff also continued to exist.

The command of the Prussian Army had been reformed in the wake of the defeats suffered by Prussia in the Napoleonic Wars. Rather than rely primarily on the martial skills of the individual members of the German nobility, who dominated the military profession, the Prussian Army instituted changes to ensure excellence in leadership, organisation, and planning. The General Staff system, which sought to institutionalise military excellence, was the main result. It sought to identify military talent at the lower levels and develop it thoroughly through academic training and practical experience on division, corps, and higher staffs, up to the Great General Staff, the senior planning body of the army. It provided planning and organisational work during peacetime and wartime. The Prussian General Staff, proven in battle in the Wars of Unification, became the German General Staff upon the formation of the German Empire, given Prussia's leading role in the German Army.

=== Military role in foreign policy decisions ===
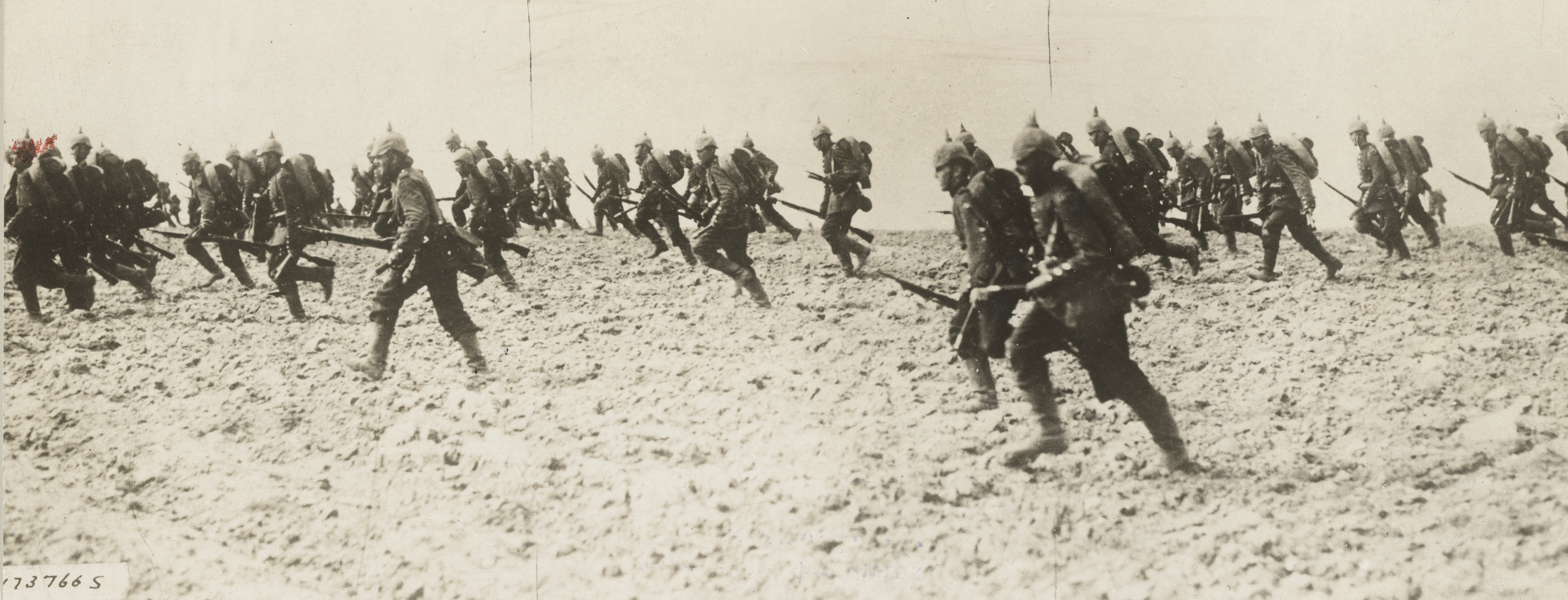
German infantry charging across open ground on the battlefield, 1914

In the German Empire, diplomatic relations were the responsibility of the Chancellor and his Foreign Minister. The German Army reported separately to the emperor, and increasingly played a major role in shaping foreign policy when military alliances or warfare was at issue. In diplomatic terms, Germany used the Prussian system of military attachés attached to diplomatic locations, with highly talented young officers assigned to evaluate the strengths, weaknesses, and military capabilities of their assigned nations. They used close observation, conversations, and paid agents to produce very high-quality reports that gave a significant advantage to the military planners. The military staff grew increasingly powerful, reducing the role of the Minister of War, and increasingly asserted itself in foreign policy decisions.

Otto von Bismarck, the Imperial Chancellor from 1871 to 1890, was annoyed by military interference in foreign policy affairs – in 1887, for example, they tried to convince the emperor to declare war on Russia; they also encouraged Austria-Hungary to attack Russia. Bismarck never controlled the army, but he did complain vehemently, and the military leaders drew back. In 1905, when the First Moroccan Crisis was roiling international politics, the Chief of the General Staff Alfred von Schlieffen called for a preventive war against France. At a critical point in the July Crisis of 1914, Helmuth von Moltke, the chief of staff, without telling the emperor or chancellor, advised his counterpart in Austria-Hungary to mobilise against Russia at once. During the First World War, Generalfeldmarschall Paul von Hindenburg increasingly set foreign policy, working directly with the emperor—and indeed shaped his decision-making—leaving the chancellor and civilian officials in the dark. Historian Gordon A. Craig says that the crucial decisions in 1914, "were made by the soldiers and that, in making them, they displayed an almost complete disregard for political considerations."

=== Chiefs of the German General Staff (1871–1919) ===
- Helmuth von Moltke the Elder (7 October 1857 – 10 August 1888)
- Alfred von Waldersee (10 August 1888 – 7 February 1891)
- Alfred von Schlieffen (7 February 1891 – 1 January 1906)
- Helmuth von Moltke the Younger (1 January 1906 – 14 September 1914)
- Erich von Falkenhayn (14 September 1914 – 29 August 1916)
- Paul von Hindenburg (29 August 1916 – 3 July 1919)
- Wilhelm Groener (3–7 July 1919)
- Hans von Seeckt (7–15 July 1919)

== Structure ==
The Kaiser had full control of the armed forces but the organisation was highly complex.

In peacetime the Imperial German Army was divided into four basic levels, the Army inspectorate (Armee-Inspektion), the army corps (Armeekorps), the division, and the regiment. During wartime, the staff of the Army inspectorates formed field army commands, which controlled the corps and subordinate units. During World War I, a higher command level, the army group (Heeresgruppe), was created. Each army group controlled several field armies.

=== Army inspectorate ===
Germany was divided into army inspectorates, each of which oversaw three or four corps. There were five in 1871, with three more added between 1907 and 1913.

- I Army Inspectorate: Headquartered in Danzig, became the 8th Army on mobilisation (2 August 1914)
- II Army Inspectorate: Headquartered in Berlin, became the 3rd Army on mobilisation (2 August 1914)
- III Army Inspectorate: Headquartered in Hannover, became the 2nd Army on mobilisation (2 August 1914)
- IV Army Inspectorate: Headquartered in Munich, became the 6th Army on mobilisation (2 August 1914)
- V Army Inspectorate: Headquartered in Karlsruhe, became the 7th Army on mobilisation (2 August 1914)
- VI Army Inspectorate: Headquartered in Stuttgart, became the 4th Army on mobilisation (2 August 1914)
- VII Army Inspectorate: Headquartered in Berlin, became the 5th Army on mobilisation (2 August 1914)
- VIII Army Inspectorate: Headquartered in Saarbrücken, became the 1st Army on mobilisation (2 August 1914)

=== Corps ===
The basic organisational formation was the army corps (Armeekorps). The corps consisted of two or more divisions and various support troops, covering a geographical area. The corps was also responsible for maintaining the reserves and Landwehr in the corps area. By 1914, there were 21 corps areas under Prussian jurisdiction and three Bavarian army corps. Besides the regional corps, there was also a Guard Corps (Gardecorps), which controlled the elite Prussian Guard units. A corps usually included a light infantry (Jäger) battalion, a heavy artillery (Fußartillerie) battalion, an engineer battalion, a telegraph battalion, and a trains battalion. Some corps areas also disposed of fortress troops; each of the 25 corps had a Field Aviation Unit (Feldflieger Abteilung) attached to it normally equipped with six unarmed "A" or "B" class unarmed two-seat observation aircraft apiece.

In wartime, the army corps became a mobile tactical formation and four Höhere Kavallerie-Kommando (Higher Cavalry Commands) were formed from the Cavalry Inspectorate, the equivalent of corps, being made up of two divisions of cavalry.

The areas formerly covered by the corps each became the responsibility of a Wehrkreis (military district, sometimes translated as corps area). The military districts were to supervise the training and enlistment of reservists and new recruits. Originally each military district was linked to an army corps; thus Wehrkreis I took over the area that I. Armeekorps had been responsible for and sent replacements to the same formation. The first sixteen reserve corps raised followed the same pattern; X. Reserve-Korps was made up of reservists from the same area as X. Armeekorps. However, these links between rear areas and front line units were broken as the war went on and later corps were raised with troops from all over Germany.

=== Division ===
The basic tactical formation was the division. A standard Imperial German division was organised into:

- Division HQ
- Two infantry brigades organised into a brigade HQ and two regiments each (either of the line or light infantry),
- A cavalry brigade organised into a brigade HQ and two regiments
- An artillery brigade organised into an HQ and two regiments
- Combat service and support regiments under division HQ

One of the divisions in a corps area usually also managed the corps Landwehr region (Landwehrbezirk). In 1914, besides the Guard Corps (two Guard divisions and a Guard cavalry division), there were 42 regular divisions in the Prussian Army (including four Saxon divisions and two Württemberg divisions), and six divisions in the Bavarian Army.

These divisions were all mobilised in August 1914. They were reorganised, receiving engineer companies and other support units from their corps, and giving up most of their cavalry to form cavalry divisions. Reserve divisions were also formed, Landwehr brigades were aggregated into divisions, and other divisions were formed from replacement (Ersatz) units. As World War I progressed, additional divisions were formed, and by wars' end, 251 divisions had been formed or reformed in the German Army's structure.

=== Regiment ===
The regiment was the basic combat unit as well as the recruiting base for soldiers. When inducted, a soldier entered a regiment, usually through its replacement or training battalion, and received his basic training. There were three basic types of regiment: infantry, cavalry, and artillery. Other specialties, such as pioneers (combat engineers) and signal troops, were organised into smaller support units. Regiments also carried the traditions of the army, in many cases stretching back into the 17th and 18th centuries. After World War I, regimental traditions were carried forward in the Reichswehr and its successor, the Wehrmacht, but the chain of tradition was broken in 1945 as West German and East German units did not carry forward pre-1945 traditions.

Each Imperial German regiment of infantry had headquarters units, three battalions, and one training battalion assigned to the regimental depot. Cavalry, field, and horse artillery regiments were also similarly organised.

=== National contingents ===
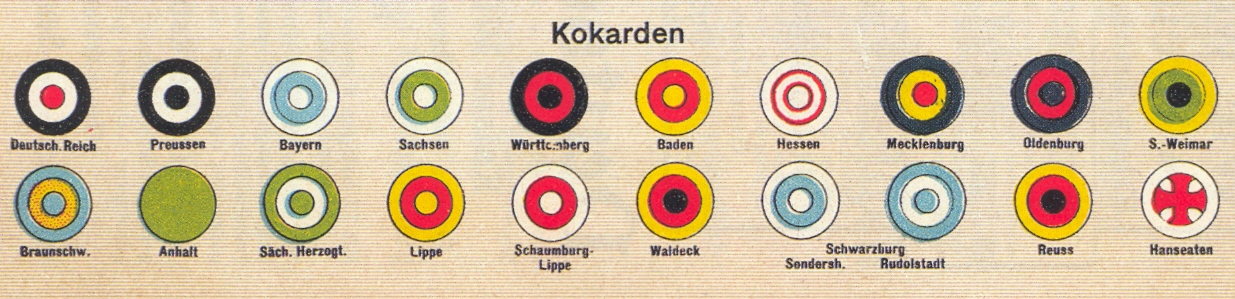
Imperial and state cockades

The German Empire was formed by 38 duchies and kingdoms each with their traditions of warfare. Although the new army of the united German Empire was nominally "German" and most state forces served integrated into the Prussian Army, the Bavarian Army, the Saxon Army, and the Württemberg Army remained independent national contingents:

The Royal Saxon Army...was the national army of the Kingdom of Saxony one of the four states of the German Reich to retain its own armed forces.

— Lucas & Schmieschek (2015)

Nevertheless, in times of war, all of these would pledge allegiance to the Kaiser and the German nation. They did, however, remain organisationally distinct, being able to raise units of their own without assistance from the dominating Prussians. In one instance, Freiherr von Sonden (from Württemberg) was able to "quite legitimately send a request directly to the Ministry of War in Stuttgart for the raising of a new artillery regiment".

Regiments and units from separate constituents were also raised locally and often numbered independently from each other – for example, there was (among others) both a Bavarian 1st Infantry Regiment and a Württemberger 1st Infantry Regiment.

While the aforementioned contingents wore distinctive uniforms, with the differences becoming less over time, the origin of units would be denoted on the uniform in the colours of the rank insignia until the early 20th century. They also had different cockades on the headgear. The Imperial cockade was to be worn above the state cockade on hats and caps, while they were worn on the right (state on the left) of helmets and more specialised headgear.

== Strength of the peace time army in 1914 ==
- 217 infantry regiments of three battalions
- 18 Jäger battalions
- 110 cavalry regiments
- 100 field artillery regiments
- 25 heavy artillery regiments
- 35 engineer battalions

== Compulsory military service ==
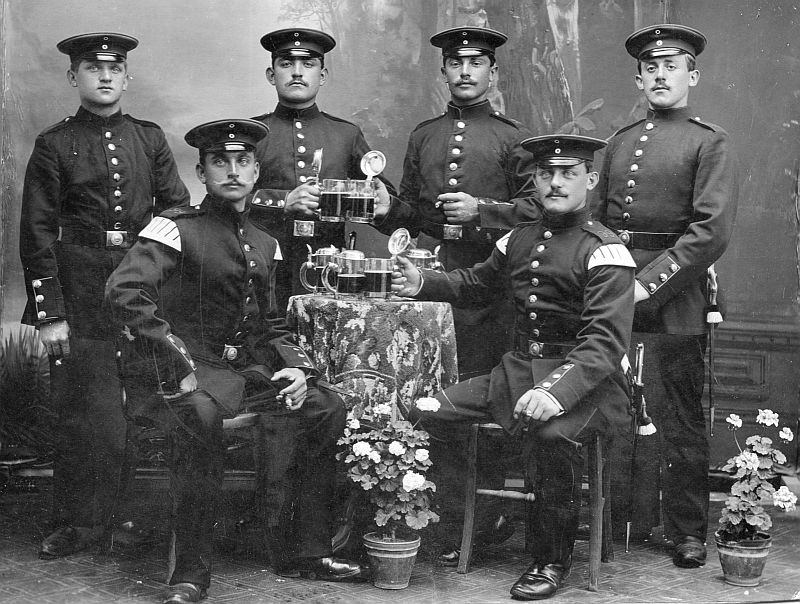
Draftees of the German Army, 1898

At the time of the first world war, every German citizen was liable for compulsory military service for men began at the age of 18 and lasted until the age of 46. There were exceptions for those unfit for service or those criminally excluded, and there was an exemption for students while they pursued their studies.

From 1893 compulsory those drafted into the army served:

1. Active service for 2 years (3 in the cavalry) from the age of 20,
2. Reserve duty for 5 years (4 in the cavalry),
3. Landwehr first levy during the 18th and 19th year of age, and for 5 years after the reserve-duty service,
4. Landwehr second levy until the 40th birthday
5. Landsturm until they were 46.

One-year volunteering was open to men between 17 and 23, (Note: Section 14 of the Reich Military Law.) with certain academic qualifications and who could equip and support themselves at their own expense. This would fulfill their service obligation and allowed them to choose their own unit. They were expected to be trained as reserve officers or non-commissioned officers.

Men not drafted for the army or the navy belonged to the Landsturm from age 18 until age 46 and before the war were fairly numerous as the peacetime army only needed to conscript about 50% of its annual class of men to fill the peacetime army, compared to about 85% in France.

=== Imitation by other Powers ===
When the British decided to reform their army in the 1860s, they surveyed the major European forces and decided that the Prussian system was the best one. That system was continued into the Imperial Army after 1871 and resulted in a modest cadre of professional officers and sergeants, and a large reserve force that could be quickly mobilised at the start of a war. The British could not use the system because they rejected conscription. The Japanese, however, were also observing the reserve system and, unlike the British, decided to copy the Prussian model. Barnett (1970) explains that every young man was drafted at age 18, with the upper-class becoming officers:

the Prussian system... was based on service of only three years with the colors... and four years in the reserve. The Prussian standing army had become simply a training cadre for the intake of conscripts. The Prussian army's organization for peace and war was virtually the same. Prussia was divided into army-corps districts for the purposes both of administration and of recruitment. On the outbreak of war the command organizations of the district became that of a corps in the field. Localization of the Army and its recruitment gave the districts pride and interest in their 'own' corps.

== Industrial base ==
The German Empire accounted for 12% of global industrial output in 1914, making it the largest industrial base in Continental Europe, and behind only Great Britain (18%) and the United States (22%) worldwide. The army closely cooperated with industry, especially in the Great War, with particular focus on the very rapidly changing aircraft industry. The army set prices and labour exemptions, regulated the supply of credit and raw materials, limited patent rights so as to allow cross-licensing among firms, and supervised management–labour relationships. The result was very rapid expansion and a high output of high-quality aircraft, as well as high wages that attracted the best machinists. Apart from aircraft, the army's regulation of the rest of the war economy was largely inefficient.

== Air Force ==
The Deutsche Luftstreitkräfte, known before October 1916 as Die Fliegertruppen des deutschen Kaiserreiches (The Air Corps of the German Empire), was the over-land air arm of the German Army during World War I. Although its name actually means something very close to the "Air Forces", it remained an integral part of the German Army for the duration of the war. The Kaiserliche Marine of the German Empire had their own, separate Marine-Fliegerabteilung maritime aviation forces, apart from the Luftstreitkräfte of the army.

== Ranks of the Imperial German Army ==
The German Army from 1871 to 1914 inherited the various traditions and military ranks of its constituent states, thus becoming a truly federal armed service.

=== Commissioned officer ranks ===
Critics long believed that the army's officer corps was heavily dominated by Junker aristocrats, so that commoners were shunted into low-prestige branches, such as the heavy artillery or supply. However, by the 1890s, the top ranks were opened to highly talented commoners.

The rank insignia of commissioned officers.

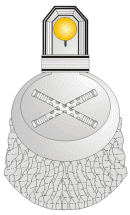
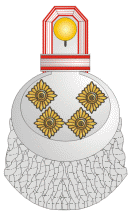
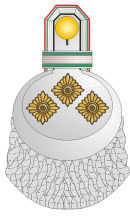
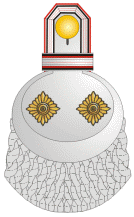
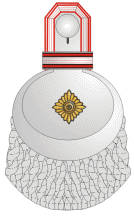
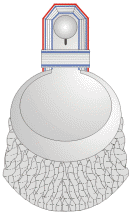
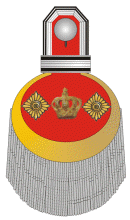
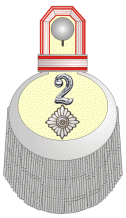
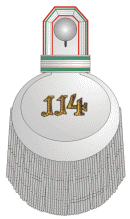
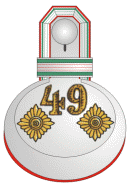
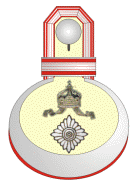
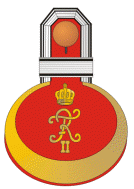
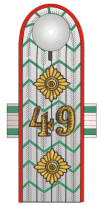
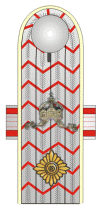
| Rank group | General / flag officers | | | | | | Senior officers | | | Junior officers |
|---|---|---|---|---|---|---|---|---|---|---|---|---|
| Epaulette (Full dress uniform) |
| Shoulder board (Waffenrock) |
| | Generalfeldmarschall | Generaloberst (im Rang des Generalfeldmarschall) | Generaloberst | General der Waffengattung | Generalleutnant | Generalmajor | Oberst | Oberstleutnant | Major | Hauptmann/ Rittmeister (Note: Several German armies and national contingents, including Prussia and Bavaria, traditionally used two different captain ranks that originated with the ownership of units. The Captain 1st Class was either the proprietor who had raised and equipped the Company / Troop / Battery or was a gentleman or nobleman who had bought a commission as its nominal Captain. The Captain 2nd Class (or Stabshauptmann > "Staff Captain") was its actual commander. By the end of the 19th century that dual-system had been gradually phased out and replaced by a single rank.) | Oberleutnant | Leutnant |

=== Other ranks ===
The rank insignia of non-commissioned officers and enlisted personnel.

| Rank group | Non-commissioned officers | | | | Enlisted |
|---|---|---|---|---|---|
| Imperial German Army |
| Imperial German Army | Etatmäßiger Feldwebel | Vizefeldwebel | Sergeant | Unteroffizier | Gefreiter |

== Dissolution ==
The Imperial Army was abolished on 6 March 1919, and the provisional Reichswehr was created.

== See also ==
- All Quiet on the Western Front (novel set in World War I about German Army comrades)
- Bavarian Army
- German Army
- German Army order of battle (1914)
- German Army order of battle, Western Front (1918)
- Imperial German Army in World War I
- German General Staff
- Oberste Heeresleitung
- Prussian Army
- Reichswehr
- Schutztruppe
- Wehrmacht

== General and cited references ==
- Bunkley, Joel William (1918). Military And Naval Recognition Book: A Handbook On The Organization, Uniforms And Insignia Of Rank Of The World's Armed Forces (2nd ed.). New York: D. Van Nostrand Company.
- Fircks, Karl Ernst Wilhelm von [in German] (1914). Taschenkalender für das Heer 1914 (in German). Berlin: Verlag von A. Bath.
- Lucas, Andrew; Schmieschek, Jürgen (2015). Fighting the Kaiser's War: The Saxons in Flanders, 1914/1918. Pen and Sword. ISBN 978-1-4738-4778-1.
- Williams, Dion (1918). "XI: Uniforms and Insignia of Foreign Armies and Navies". Army and Navy Uniforms and Insignia. New York: Frederick A. Stokes Company. pp. 216–292.
- War Department (1917). Notes on the German Army in the War. Washington: Government Printing Office.
