= Adolph von Carlowitz =

German army commander (1858–1928)

Hans Carl Adolph von Carlowitz
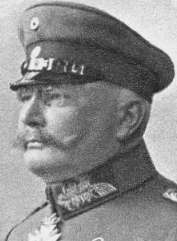
- Born: 25 March 1858; Riesa, Kingdom of Saxony
- Died: 9 July 1928 (aged 70) Hartha, Free State of Saxony, Weimar Republic
- Allegiance: Kingdom of Saxony; German Empire
- Branch: Royal Saxon Army; German Army
- Service years: 1879–1919
- Rank: Minister of War of Saxony; General of the Infantry
- Commands: 9th Army; 2nd Army
- Conflicts: World War I: First Battle of Ypres; Lake Naroch Offensive; Battle of the Lys (1918); Battle of St. Quentin Canal
- Awards: Military Order of St. Henry; Pour le Mérite with Oak Leaves

Hans Carl Adolph von Carlowitz (25 March 1858 – 9 July 1928) served as a German army commander during the First World War.

== Early life ==
Coming from an ancient noble family, Carlowitz studied rights at the Leipzig University. In 1879, he entered the Saxon army. From 1885 to 1888 Carlowitz studied at the Prussian military academy in Berlin and afterwards served on the Imperial German General Staff. By 1913, he had become Lieutenant general and in May 1914, he succeeded Max von Hausen as Minister of War of the Kingdom of Saxony.

== First World War ==
Upon mobilization in August 1914, Carlowitz received command of the German XXVII Reserve Corps as a General of the Infantry. His Corps participated in the First Battle of Ypres, in which Carlowitz, without any previous battle experience, couldn't handle the stress. On 27 October he was relieved of command and sent on sick leave. One month later he returned to service as commander of the 12th Reserve Division. In August 1915, he was sent to the Russian Front at the head of the III Reserve Corps with which he fought against the Russian Lake Naroch Offensive.

In August 1917, he returned to the Western Front to lead the XIX (2nd Royal Saxon) Corps. He participated with success in the Battle of the Lys (1918), and became commander in August 1918 of the 9th Army until it was dissolved on 18 September 1918. He then took command of the 2nd Army, which fought against the Fourth British Army between Cambrai and Saint Quentin.

After the end of the war, he retired from the army. He died in 1928 and was buried in the Nordfriedhof (Dresden). Esther von Kirchbach was one of his 4 children.

== Sources ==
- SGV
- Sachsen Digital
- Deutsche kriegsgeschichte

Military offices
Preceded by Max von Hausen	Minister of War of Saxony; 21 May 1914 – October 1915	Succeeded by Karl Viktor von Wilsdorf
Preceded by Fritz von Below	Commander, 9th Army; August – 18 September, 1918	Succeeded by Dissolved
Preceded by Georg von der Marwitz	Commander, 2nd Army; September–November 1918	Succeeded by Dissolved
