= Gaston Thierry =

German officer and civil servant

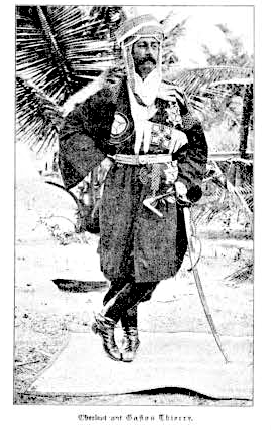
- Lieutenant Gaston Thierry, posing in African clothing on the coast of German-Togo in June 1899
- Born: 17 July 1866; Munich
- Died: 16 September 1904 (aged 38) near Mubi
- Burial place: Garoua
- Military career
- Allegiance: Germany
- Branch: Army
- Service years: 1886-1904
- Rank: Captain
- Unit: Infantry Regiment No. 88

Gaston Thierry (17 July 1866 – 16 September 1904) was a German officer and civil servant in Togo and Cameroon.

== Life ==
Thierry was the son of a tradesman. After attending the Gymnasium, he joined the Infantry Regiment No. 88 in 1886. In the same year, he became Portepee-Fähnrich (ensign with sword-knot) and in 1887 Sekondeleutnant (second lieutenant). In 1891 he retired from the army and became a member of the First See-Bataillon. In 1894, after the suppression of the mutiny of the police force, he was temporarily ordered to Cameroon. In 1894 he was promoted to first lieutenant. He resigned on 12 September 1895 from the Marine Infantry and entered into the Grenadier Regiment of King Frederick William II (1st Silesian) No. 10.

In June 1896 he was made à la suite of the regiment and ordered to serve at the Colonial Department of the Imperial Foreign Office. Thierry was first sent to German-Togo, where he served as station director of Sansanné-Mango and district manager in Yendi, and was involved in the occupation of the north. He led and co-led several military expeditions against local communities, including the 1896 conquest of Dagbon and the Battle of Adibo, a triple expedition against the Kabiye in January 1898 together with Hermann Kersting and Valentin von Massow, and one against the Moba in 1899.

In late 1897, he ordered his troops to shoot down the Anufo leader of Sansanné-Mango, Biema Asabiè. Thierry had accused Biema Asabiè of having signed a treaty with the French and had arrested him despite King Biema's denial of those charges.

In 1900, Thierry was accused by the Governor of German Togoland of poor management of the station's expenses and reckless diplomacy with the neighbouring French colonialists. In addition the governor wrote:

"Thierry's main activity consisted in leading the life of some kind of mercenary, repeatedly absconding from the station for many months and undertaking one punitive expedition after another, resulting in abundant spoils of war which provided the basis for his business."

The Governor dismissed him from his function as head of station in Sansanné-Mango and in 1902, after his home leave, Thierry was transferred to the German colonial territory in Cameroon, stationed first in Victoria and, after his promotion to captain (12 September 1902), he was appointed head of the station in Yaoundé. In 1903 he accompanied Governor Jesko von Puttkamer on his trip to Lake Chad and on this occasion was appointed first Resident of the colonial province of Adamawa on 20 September 1903.

== Death and legacy ==
Thierry was mortally wounded in an expedition he led against Jeremia Issa and his followers in Mubi. He died succumbing from a poisoned arrow on 16 September 1904. He was buried in Garoua.

A year after his death, in 1905, the case of Thierry's brutality against Africans was brought back to the spotlight as parliamentary debates on colonial affairs took place after several scandals involving officers and missionaries in German-Togo hit the headlines in the German press. The official parliamentary indulgence stipulated that Captain Thierry had shot down the father of the pupil of the Catholic mission in Lomé, after he had climbed up a tree to flee from the officer. Furthermore, the pupil reported that Thierry would shoot down local people as one would shoot game, and that his acts of cruelty were grounds for his notoriety in the entire protectorate.

=== Thierry's collections and spoils of war in museums ===
In 1900, Thierry sold no less than 1700 of what museums at the time viewed as "ethnographic objects" to three German museums: the Ethnological Museum of Berlin, the Linden-Museum in Stuttgart and the Leipzig Museum of Ethnography. Amongst those 1700 objects were weapons and personal items he had looted from his leading military expeditions in German Togoland, including the belongings of Biema Asabiè and other Anufo leaders of Sansanné-Mango. After Gaston Thierry's death in 1904, his brother sold dozens of objects that Thierry had taken away during his colonial career in German Togoland to the Field Museum in Chicago.

Thierry also sent zoological specimen to the Berlin Museum of Natural History. In fact, a species of West African lizard, Chalcides thierryi, was named in his honor.

== Sources ==
- Ergebnisse der Untersuchung über den Tod des Hauptmanns Thierry, in: Deutsches Kolonialblatt 16 (1905), p. 161 (in German).
- Manfred Maximilian Ulbrich: Offizier-Stammliste des Grenadier-Regiments König Friedrich Wilhelm II. (1. Schlesischen) Nr. 10 1808-1908, Berlin 1907, p. 499f. (in German).
