= Chalcides thierryi =

Conservation status
- Least Concern (IUCN 3.1)

Scientific classification
- Kingdom: Animalia
- Phylum: Chordata
- Class: Reptilia
- Order: Squamata
- Family: Scincidae
- Genus: Chalcides
- Species: C. thierryi

Binomial name
- Chalcides thierryi Tornier, 1901

Synonyms
- Chalcides bottegi var. thierryi Tornier, 1901; Chalcides bottegi thierryi — Loveridge, 1936; Chalcides thierryi — Joger & Lambert, 2002

Species of lizard

Chalcides thierryi, commonly known as Thierry's cylindrical skink, is a species of lizard in the family Scincidae. The species is indigenous to West Africa.

== Etymology ==
The specific name, thierryi, is in honor of German military officer Gaston Thierry, who served in Togo.

== Geographic range ==
Chalcides thierryi is found in Benin, Burkina Faso, northern Ghana, Mali, Nigeria, Senegal, and Togo.

== Habitat ==
The preferred natural habitat of C. thierryi is savanna.

== Reproduction ==
C. thierryi is viviparous.
