= Imperial German Army in World War I =

(German Empire)
- Deutsches Heer
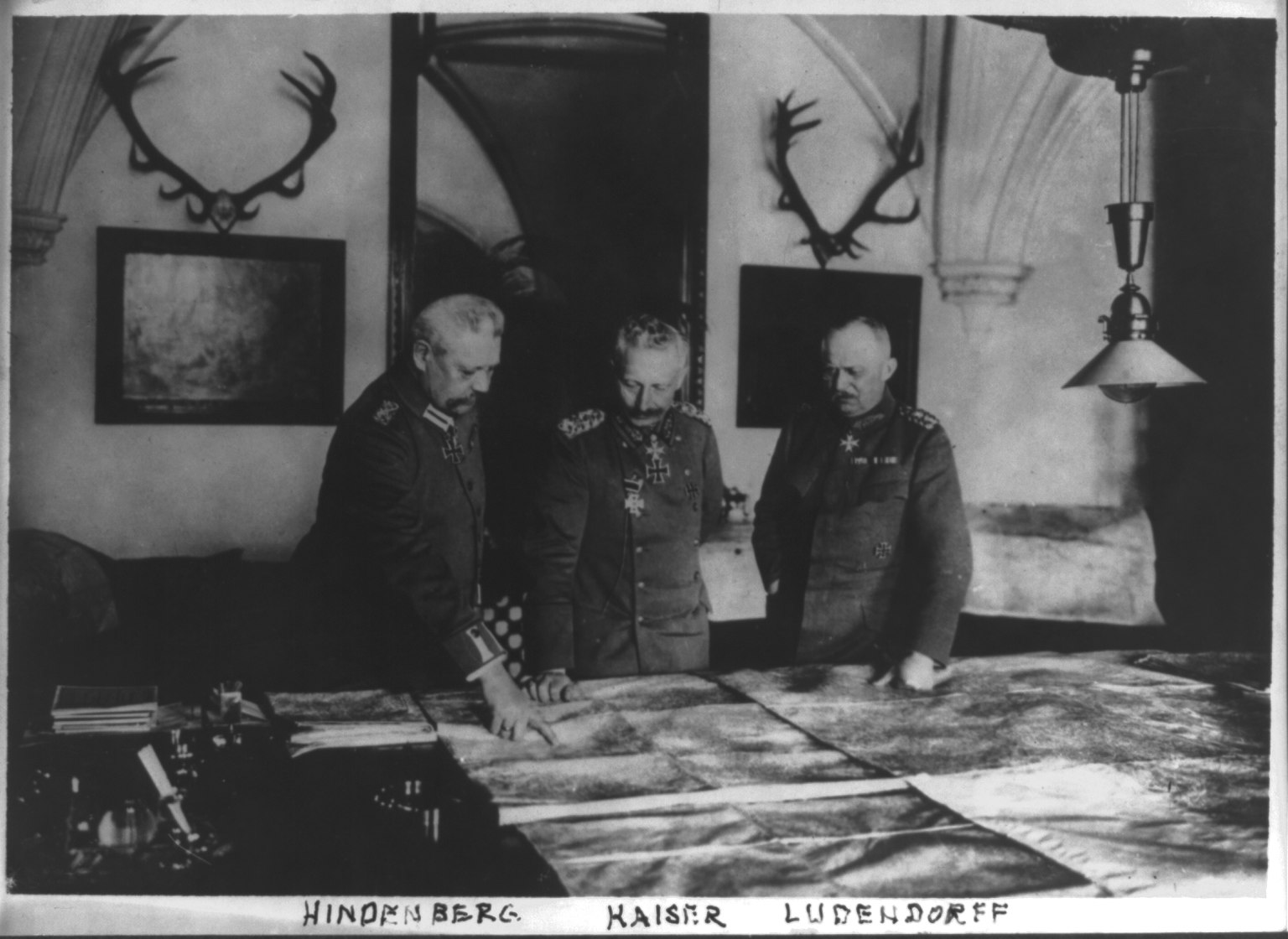
- General Paul von Hindenburg, Kaiser Wilhelm II, and General Erich Ludendorff standing at a table, examining large maps
- Motto: Gott mit uns
- Founded: 1871
- Disbanded: 1918
- Service branches: Infantry, Artillery, Cavalry
- Headquarters: Berlin

Leadership
- deutscher Kaiser: Wilhelm II
- Chef des Generalstabes des Feldheeres: Erich von Falkenhayn; Paul von Hindenburg

Personnel
- Conscription: from the completed 17th to the completed 45th year of age

Expenditure
- Budget: 2,224 millionen Goldmark

The Imperial German Army in World War I was the largest armed force in Germany. The German Army was a highly organized and complexly structured armed force made up of various types of troops and units. At the beginning of the war, the army was strongly influenced by the traditions of the 19th century, with its organization and structure based on the experiences of the Unification Wars and the Prussian military system. It consisted of active troops, the reserve, the Landwehr and the Landsturm. These different parts of the army were organized along territorial lines, with each German state providing its own contingents. The troops were divided into armies, army corps, divisions, brigades and regiments, with leadership being largely determined by the Oberste Heeresleitung (OHL) under the direction of the Kaiser and later prominent generals such as Hindenburg and Ludendorff.

With the beginning of the war and the transition from wars of movement to positional warfare, there were extensive organizational changes. The original structure, which was designed for rapid offensives as in the Schlieffen Plan, proved to be inadequate for the challenges of trench warfare. To meet the new requirements, additional units were set up, including specialized shock troops trained for rapid attacks on enemy positions. The air force, which was initially only used for reconnaissance, also became increasingly important and was used for bombing and air combat. Overall, the German army was subject to constant change during the First World War. The initial focus on rapid movement operations was replaced by the requirements of positional warfare, which necessitated far-reaching organizational and tactical adjustments. Despite its high level of professionalism and adaptability, however, the army was unable to compensate for the enormous material and personnel losses and the superiority of the Allies at the end of the war.

== Command, control and organization ==
As German Emperor and King of Prussia, Wilhelm II was the commander-in-chief of the German armed forces. He determined their structure, declared war, made peace and concluded treaties. The Emperor based his decisions on three military advisors: the heads of the Military Cabinet, the War Ministry and the General Staff. The importance of these three bodies increased so much over the course of the war that the Kaiser's position was ultimately only nominal and Hindenburg had so much power in the final years of the war that, as Chief of the General Staff, he became de facto Commander-in-Chief. The Military Cabinet had the task of controlling all appointments – with the exception of those within the General Staff – promotions, retirements, honors and awards. The War Ministry was responsible for the administration of the army, including finance, recruitment, supply, discipline, justice, pensions and barracks. The General Staff dealt with operations and intelligence as well as the training of staff officers for the entire army.

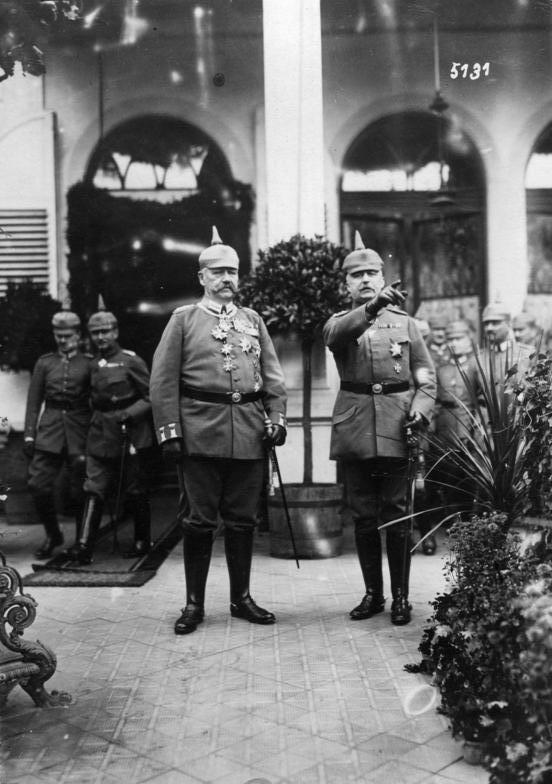
Hindenburg and Ludendorff at the Grosses Hauptquartier in Bad Kreuznach

The post of Chief of the General Staff was a permanent position, and at the outbreak of war its holder automatically became Chief of the General Staff of the Army. In 1914, Colonel General Helmuth von Moltke, son of the German commander in the Franco-Prussian War, held this post. After the failure of the offensive in the west, he was replaced by Lieutenant General Erich von Falkenhayn, whose only major contribution to the war was the bloody Battle of Verdun. In August 1916, he was replaced by Field Marshal Paul von Hindenburg, the victor of Tannenberg. In peacetime, all three control divisions of the army were roughly equally important, with the War Ministry perhaps holding the leading position. With the start of operations in 1914, however, the administrative duties of the Military Cabinet and the War Ministry became a routine matter, while the General Staff, which directed the operations of the field army, rose to a position of leadership from which it could dictate the course of the war. In this way, Hindenburg dominated the German war effort, and the Kaiser also ultimately acted according to his wishes.

In the pre-war period, the three bodies mentioned above had exclusively administrative and organizational tasks. Command of the troops lay with the commanders of the army corps, who had the right to appeal directly to the Emperor and thus break the normal chain of command. The army corps districts were the basic organizational units of the army in peacetime, and their commanders were responsible for all matters concerning the troops and facilities in their area. In wartime, these commanders led entire army corps into the field, and the depots left behind formed the basic framework on which the expansion of the army was based.

== Army inspection ==
To ensure the effectiveness and operational readiness of the armed forces, there were two different inspection systems for the army. The inspectors general and their staffs had the task of maintaining the technical performance of the army. Each branch of the armed forces had its own inspection. The inspections of cavalry, foot artillery, pioneers, military intelligence and training were almost autonomous, while the inspections of field artillery, hunters and riflemen. Platoon and Landwehr only existed within the framework of the army corps.

Responsibility for the machine-gun troops, the military bands, the military prisons, the veterinary service and the chaplaincy service was exercised directly by the War Office, which appointed its own inspectors, as it did in a number of other limited technical and professional areas. The inspection of infantry was carried out by the Army Inspectors, who were distinguished by being an important element in the higher command structure of the Army. In the event of war, each army inspectorate became an army command, and its commander had a permanent staff large enough to fulfill this task. The pre-war army comprised eight army inspectorates, which are listed below with their subordinate army corps and the locations of their staffs:

Inspection	Location	Corps
1	Danzig	I, XVII, XX
2	Berlin	Garde, XII, XIX
3	Hannover	VII, IX, X
4	München	III, I, II, III. Bayrisches Armeekorps
5	Karlsruhe	VIII, XIV, XV
6	Stuttgart	IV, XI, XIII
7	Saarbrücken	XVI, XVIII, XXI
8	Berlin	II, V, VI

== General staff ==
The Great General Staff (Großer Generalstab), created in 1871, was responsible for the ongoing examination, preparation and control of mobilization and military operations. At the beginning of the war, it became the General Staff of the Field Army under the Supreme Army Command. At this time, there were 113 general staff officers in the various departments. The General Staff was divided into three different groups. The command departments of the General Staff (Central Department, Operations Department, Intelligence Department since May 1917, Foreign Armies Department, Department IIIb, Political Department and, since February 1916, Military Political Department), the Quartermaster General with the subordinate departments, the Supreme Arms Authorities and the heads of the technical departments as well as the branch offices of the OHL. As a result of the expansion of the areas of responsibility of industrialized warfare, there were many overlaps with the War Ministry as well as other military agencies and Reich authorities within the departments and divisions.

=== Field army ===
Upon mobilization, each of the eight army inspectorates was transformed into an army. Each army was divided into up to six army corps. The corps controlled by the inspectorates in peacetime were not necessarily those placed under their command at mobilization. The armies originally formed on 2 August 1914 were as follows:

- 1. Armee (Generaloberst Alexander von Kluck)
- 2. Armee (Generaloberst Karl von Bülow)
- 3. Armee (Generaloberst Max von Hausen)
- 4. Armee (Generaloberst Albrecht Herzog von Württemberg)
- 5. Armee (Generalleutnant William of Prussia)
- 6. Armee (Generaloberst Kronprinz Rupprecht von Bayern)
- 7. Armee (Generaloberst Josias von Heeringen)
- 8. Armee (Generaloberst Maximilian von Prittwitz und Gaffron)

In addition to field armies, there were improvised, independent large formations called Armee Abteilung. They consisted of levies from other units, often Landwehr troops and a small amount of heavy artillery. They were not subordinate to an army high command, but were independent "small armies" which, like normal armies, received decrees and orders from the Supreme Army Command and the War Ministry. They therefore sooner or later received a regular supreme command themselves and could also be upgraded to a fully-fledged army after any troop reinforcements.

An army was usually commanded by a colonel general. The staff of an army was usually divided into four sections:

- Section I. – General Staff – Consisting of general staff officers. It was divided into the following sub-sections:
  - I(a)-Operations, Orders, Order of Battle, Tactics, Training, Security
  - I(b)-areas, movements, traffic control, road control, salvage
  - I(c)-Intelligence, Air Service, Signals
  - I(d)-Ammunition supply (artillery and infantry)
- Section II – Adjutancy – consisting of a general staff officer and several adjutant officers. It was subdivided into:
  - II(a)-Personnel, promotions, honours and rewards, leave, chaplains, lectures, regimental newspapers, supplies, transport, clothing, boots, captured material
  - II(b)-Organisation, facilities, strength, return, billeting, replacement of weapons, ammunition and horses, counter-espionage and censorship, grave registration, railway service
  - II(c)-Internal Economy, Routine Orders, Returns
- Section III-Field Justice Office, under the direction of the Court Martial Council

Duties of the provost marshal, discipline, court martial jurisdiction

- Section IV – Intendant's Office, Medical and Veterinary Service, staffed by military officers, medical and veterinary officers
  - IV(a)-Administrative matters, rations, clothing, pay, allowances, requisitions, food prices, local contributions, postal service, dealing with civilians
  - IV(b)-Sanitary service, gas protection measures
  - IV(c) or IV(d)-Veterinary services
- Sections I(d), II, III and IV were directly subordinate to the Chief Quartermaster, but the work of all sections was coordinated under the Chief of the General Staff. In addition to the general and administrative staffs, there were other additional officers.
- General of Artillery at the A.O.K., to whom two staff officers (Stoart) were subordinate, one for the field artillery and one for the heavy artillery
- General of the Pioneers
- Ammunition staff (Mun)
- Army intelligence commander (Akonach)
- Commander of the Air Force (Kofl)
- Airship commander (Koluft)
- Air Defence Commander (Koflak)
- Commander of the railway pioneers (Kodeis)
- Staff officer of the machine gun troops (Stomag)
- Staff officer of the gas troops (Stogas)
- Staff officer for surveying (Stoverm)
- Commander of the motorised troops (Kdeur. d. Krftr or Akokraft).
- Commander of the ammunition columns and trains (Kdeur. d. Mun. Kol. u. Tr. or Komit)
- Staff officer of the train (Stotrain)
- Intelligence officer (intelligence service)
- Labour commandant (A.V.B.)
- Security officer
- Collecting officer
- Army Postal Inspector
- Secret field police
- Education officer
- Commander of the Headquarters (Kdt. d. H. Qu.)

=== Corps ===
At the beginning of the war, each Army Corps District had sufficient units under its command to mobilise a complete Army Corps for the Field Army. Typically, each peacetime army corps was responsible for the oversight of two infantry divisions, a Jäger battalion, a Pioneer battalion, a Train battalion, and a Foot artillery regiment. However, the allocation of these supporting units was not uniform across the entire Army. For instance, only 18 Jager battalions were allocated to the 25 army corps districts, as opposed to 35 Pioneer battalions. The machine gun detachments and the units of the signal service were also divided unevenly. The command and administrative authority of a corps, also known as the general command, consisted of about 50 officers and other officials. The total strength of an army corps was about 44,000 men and officers. The organization of a corps staff was similar to that of an army staff and was divided into the same divisions: I, II, III and IV. The complete composition of a corps headquarters and the number of officers and officials was as follows:

- Kommandierender General
- Generalstab: Chef, Ia, Id, Ie, Id, Qu.
- Adjutantur:IIa, IIb
- Ordonnanz-Ofiziere:OI, OT, OIII, OIV, OV
- Abt. Artillerie
- Abt. Munition
- Korpsmessplan:11d
- Abt. Pioniere
- Korps-Hauptquartier
- Registratur
- Feldgendarmerie
- Feldkorpsintendantur
- Feldkriegskasse
- Korpsproviantamt
- A.D.M.S. Korpsarzt:IVb
- A.D.V.S. Korpsveterinär:IVc
- Feldjustiz:III
- Feldpostamt
- Gruppenführer der Flieger
- Gruppenbildstelle
- Gruppen-Nachrichten-Kdeur
- Gruppen-Fernsprech- Abt.
- Gruppen-Funker-Abt.
- Gruppen-Kartenstelle

=== Division ===
The division constituted the most substantial wartime entity within the German Army that was not a transient formation. Each division was assigned a specific establishment, and despite the numerous organisational changes that occurred over time, in 1918, the divisions primarily comprised the units that they had when initially mobilised or raised. In 1914 there were 50 infantry divisions, two guard divisions, 42 infantry divisions and six Bavarian divisions. Each division generally comprised four brigades, two infantry brigades and one cavalry and one field artillery brigade.In addition, each division contained 1 to 2 engineer and medical companies. The target strength of an infantry division was 17,500 officers and men, 4,000 horses, 72 artillery pieces and 24 machine guns. A cavalry division consisted of 3 brigades plus 1 mounted artillery section (3 batteries with 4 guns each), a mounted machine gun battery, an engineer section, 3 infantry battalions (each with a machine gun company), a radio section and a motorised transport column. The total strength was 5,200 officers and men, 5,600 horses, 12 guns and 12–30 machine guns

The first two years of the war saw considerable changes in the divisional structure of the German army. The 3rd Guards was formed through the reorganisation of existing Guards regiments and brigades and the expansion of the training battalion. 32 reserve infantry divisions were activated, and each field artillery brigade had nine instead of 12 batteries. The start of trench warfare led to the introduction of the infantry division with three brigades at the beginning of 1915. In March and April 1915, 19 new divisions were formed by converting existing divisions to the new formation. This division became the standard for the entire German army. In mid-1916, independent brigades were formed from newly recruited regiments, each consisting of three regiments. A reorganisation of the machine gun and mine launcher troops led to the companies being incorporated into the divisional structure. In the second half of 1916, the number of divisions was further increased. This was done primarily by reducing the number of regular and reserve divisions from four to three brigades, as well as by combining units without formations, such as the Jäger battalions. To provide the artillery required for these formations, the number of guns in a battery was reduced from six to four, leaving enough surplus guns and gunners to create the necessary new field artillery regiments. By the end of 1916, 203 infantry divisions were deployed in the field.

In 1917, the division's support troops were reorganised, with the engineer element being subordinated to the battalion staff and two engineer companies, the mine launcher company and a searchlight section being added. The medical troops were reinforced by two field hospitals, but the carrier companies were reduced to one. Each division received telephone sections, veterinary hospitals and motorised transport columns. The troops of the divisions could be deployed as radio sections, heavy artillery and labour units if they were needed in the division's front section. In 1917, 13 new divisions were formed in Germany. These were formed with a view to conscription in 1918, with wounded and small cadres of experienced soldiers from the front-line units being amalgamated with these new troops. Two new divisions were raised in the first half of 1918, and in the final months 27 divisions were activated to replace units almost completely destroyed in the summer battles. At the time of the armistice in November 1918, there were 212 divisions.

=== Regiment, battalion, company and platoon ===
In 1914, each regiment had a regimental staff, three battalions numbered I, II and III as well as a machine gun company. The battalions each consisted of four companies, which were numbered consecutively in the regiment: 1–4, 5–8 and 9–12 in the I, II and III battalions. The machine gun company bore the number 13. The regiment was commanded by a colonel, who was assisted by a lieutenant colonel as his deputy. The regimental staff consisted of 53 men and 16 horses. The battalions were commanded by a major, to whom four captains, 18 lieutenants, a medical officer and his assistant, a paymaster and 1,054 other ranks were subordinate. Each battalion had 30 platoon soldiers, who were responsible for 58 horses, four ammunition wagons, four field kitchens, 10 pack wagons – five large and five small – and one ambulance. Each company comprised five officers, 259 other ranks, 10 horses and four vehicles, divided into three platoons. Each platoon consisted of four corporals, divided into two groups of eight men each under the command of a private. The machine gun company had a strength of 99 men, six machine guns, 87 horses and 15 wagons. Each machine gun was transported on a special four-horse wagon, and three wagons were used to transport ammunition; the company was also equipped with a reserve machine gun. There were regular, reserve, Landwehr and Erstatz regiments, all of which were organized in one way or another.

=== Air Forces ===
Before the war, the air forces (Luftstreitkräfte) were overseen by the Inspectors of the Airship Troops and the Flying Troops, both of whom were directly subordinate to the Inspector of Military Aviation and Mechanical Transport. Prior to mobilization, the airship troops consisted of six battalions: five Prussian, which included the Saxon and Württemberg companies, and one Bavarian. The latter battalion combined all Bavarian airship and motor transport units under a single command. The airship battalions controlled not only the airships themselves but also the balloons. Before 1912, military aviation was concentrated at the school in Döberitz, the Lehr- und Versuchsanstalt für das Militär-Flugwesen (Military Aviation Teaching and Testing Institute), where most officers were trained. However, many pilots were trained at aviation industry schools, including the Albatros airfield in Johannisthal and the school in Gotha, which were both used for this purpose.

At mobilization, the regular units were divided into airship detachments,(Luftschiff-Trupps) field airship detachments,(Feldluftschiffer-Abteilungen) and aviation detachments (Flieger-Abteilungen). On 3 March 1917, control of all airships was transferred to the navy, and the army's airship units were converted into balloon detachments. The number of balloon detachments formed in August 1914 had increased to 54 by 1917. The role of the airship troops was reconnaissance and observation.At the beginning of the war, there were 254 trained pilots and 271 observers, who were assigned to 55 fortress aviation detachments (Festungs-Fliegerabteilungen) and field aviation detachments (Feldflieger-Abteilungen). Each detachment consisted of: 14 officers—seven pilots, six observers, and one administrative officer—116 non-commissioned officers and men; five motor vehicles, including one bus; six aircraft transporters; workshop, equipment, and ammunition wagons; and six aircraft (fortress aviation detachments had only four aircraft). They were assigned to armies as needed, and each army established an aircraft park to supply the operational units with replacement aircraft, equipment, fuel, and ammunition.

As the war progressed, the strength, complexity, and significance of the air force gradually increased. In 1915, the fortress aviation detachments were converted into field aviation detachments, and a number of artillery aviation detachments were formed to work in cooperation with the artillery units. This year also saw the creation of the first bomber units, the Kampfgeschwader of the Supreme Army Command (OHL), and in 1916, additional bomber units, the Riesenflugzeug-Abteilungen, were established. By the end of 1916, the importance of the air force had grown to such an extent that it was completely reorganized. On 25 November 1916, the air force was formally established. The Luftstreitkräfte (air forces) remained part of the army and were given precedence over the engineers and the signal service. All flying units, including airships, balloons, aircraft, and anti-aircraft artillery, were placed under the command of the air force commander. Shortly thereafter, the first fighter squadrons (Jagdstaffeln) were formed, and over time, there was a growing tendency to organize both existing and newly created units into larger combat formations for the increasingly regular air battles on the Western Front. In 1917, bomber squadrons were also formed, primarily through the restructuring of the old Kampfgeschwader of the OHL.

=== Artillery ===
In peacetime, the foot artillery comprised 25 regiments with 2 battalions of 4 batteries each, plus 1 battalion formed in 1914, making a total of 51 battalions. Twenty-five battalions in 4 batteries of 4 formed the heavy field artillery of the active army corps. Eight or nine 21 cm mortar battalions became 16 to 18 battalions with 2 batteries of 4 each as a result of reorganization. Some of these battalions had been combined into regiments. The mortar battalions were almost all subordinate to the army corps. The heavy siege artillery and garrison artillery consisted of thirteen or fourteen battalions with four batteries of four guns each.

The coastal artillery consisted of four battalions with four batteries of four guns each. Various elements created in the course of the war, supplied with garrison, coastal or naval guns, formed a heavy high-performance artillery. As a rule, each active regiment had a reserve regiment of 2 battalions with 4 batteries of 4 guns. This number was gradually increased to 9 to 14 batteries for a number of regiments. Some of these battalions formed the heavy artillery of the reserve corps; the others were assigned to the garrison and coastal artillery.

Before the outbreak of war in August 1914, field artillery comprised 642 batteries within the army. With the rising dependence of artillery the number of field batteries had risen to approximately 2,900, by 1918. At the beginning of the war, the field artillery was organised from the brigade, which was usually under the command of a major general. A brigade was further divided into regiments, detachments and batteries. There were three batteries in a detachment or battalion and two detachments in a regiment. Detachments were numbered using Roman numerals, while batteries had Arabic ones. As the war progressed, the number of detachments in new units was reduced to three for each brigade, which were organised into one field artillery regiment.

== Recruitment and Training ==
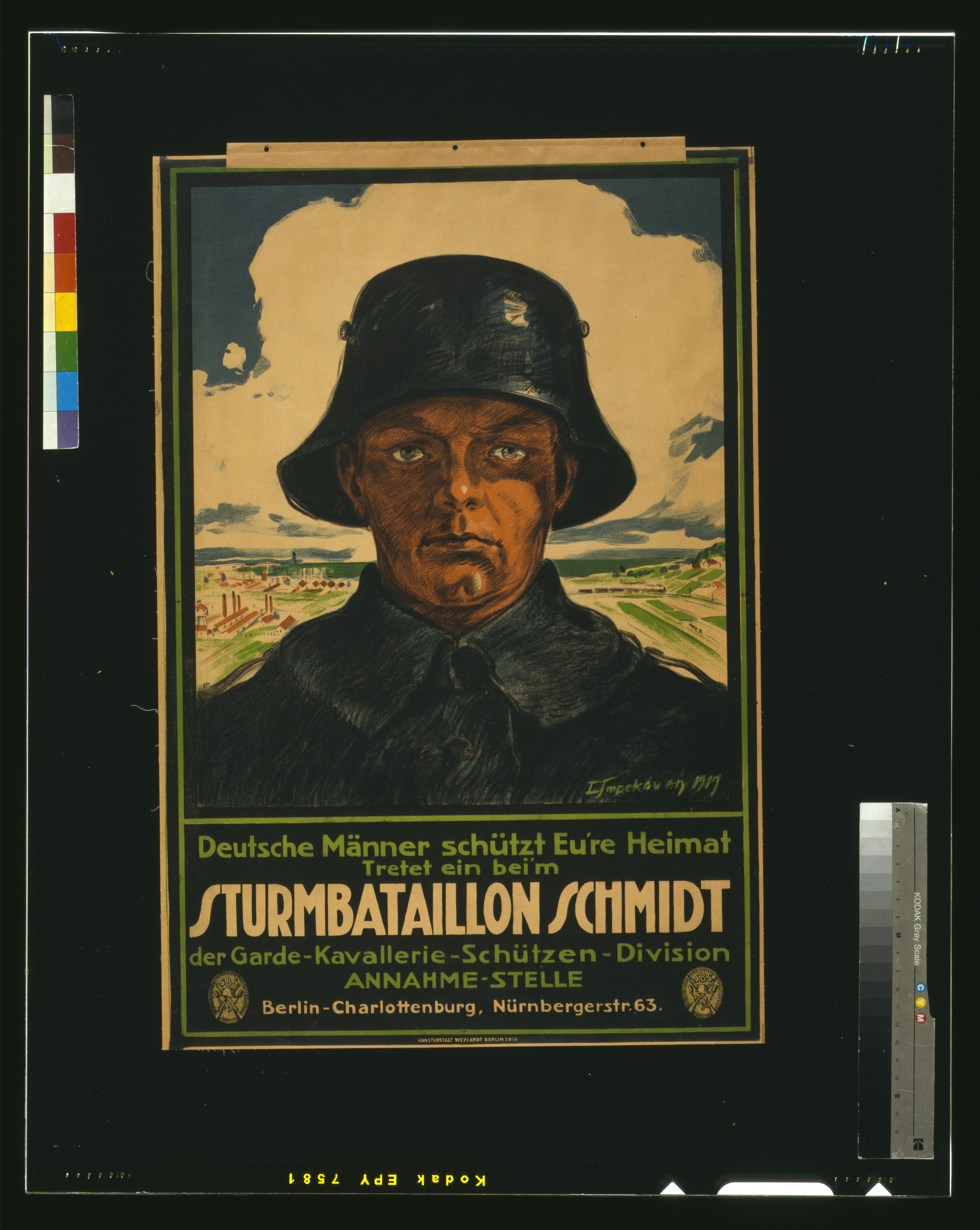
Recruitment poster for volunteers to join a stormtrooper battalion

The strength of the army before the outbreak of war was around 840,000 men, which had grown to almost 6,000,000 by the end of 1917, not including the recruits who were in training at the time. From 1893, every German was liable for military service for a period of 27 years from the age of 17 to the age of 45.

During the first months of military service, the focus was on education for military discipline and physical training – the German army did not want to start basic training until the recruits were well prepared. During this time, some recruits were sent home to work on the summer harvest, while others remained with the regiment to help with various work assignments. Basic training began in October, when the new recruits were assigned to a replacement troop unit (battalion, division, squadron or company). For the first five months, basic training focused on drill, physical training, weapons training and squad and company drill, so that complete battalions could take part in combat training by the spring. As soon as the battalions had demonstrated their abilities, regimental and later divisional field exercises were carried out. In late summer, large-scale maneuvers were scheduled, the most important of which was the annual Kaisermanöver. This annual exercise was the highlight of the military year and coincided with the discharge of the decommissioned soldiers and the induction of the new recruits.

Such a training program ensured that at least half of the infantry and around two-thirds of the artillery and cavalry were fully trained at all times. In the event of mobilization before the new recruits had completed their training, the gaps in the ranks of the regular army could be filled by the most recently discharged reservists. The fortuitous advantage of this system for the German army was that by the outbreak of war in August 1914, it was fully trained and ready for its annual maneuvers. After two years of service in the infantry, most soldiers left the standing army and were transferred to the reserve, where they were only required to participate in the annual summer field exercise for two weeks. At the end of their training, conscripts received mementos of their service, such as engraved beer mugs and other personal items. Back home, these items helped to promote the idea among other young men that military service was a rite of passage. Soldiers who demonstrated their leadership potential could be given the opportunity to pursue a reserve officer career or remain on active duty as professional soldiers (capitulants).

=== Officers ===
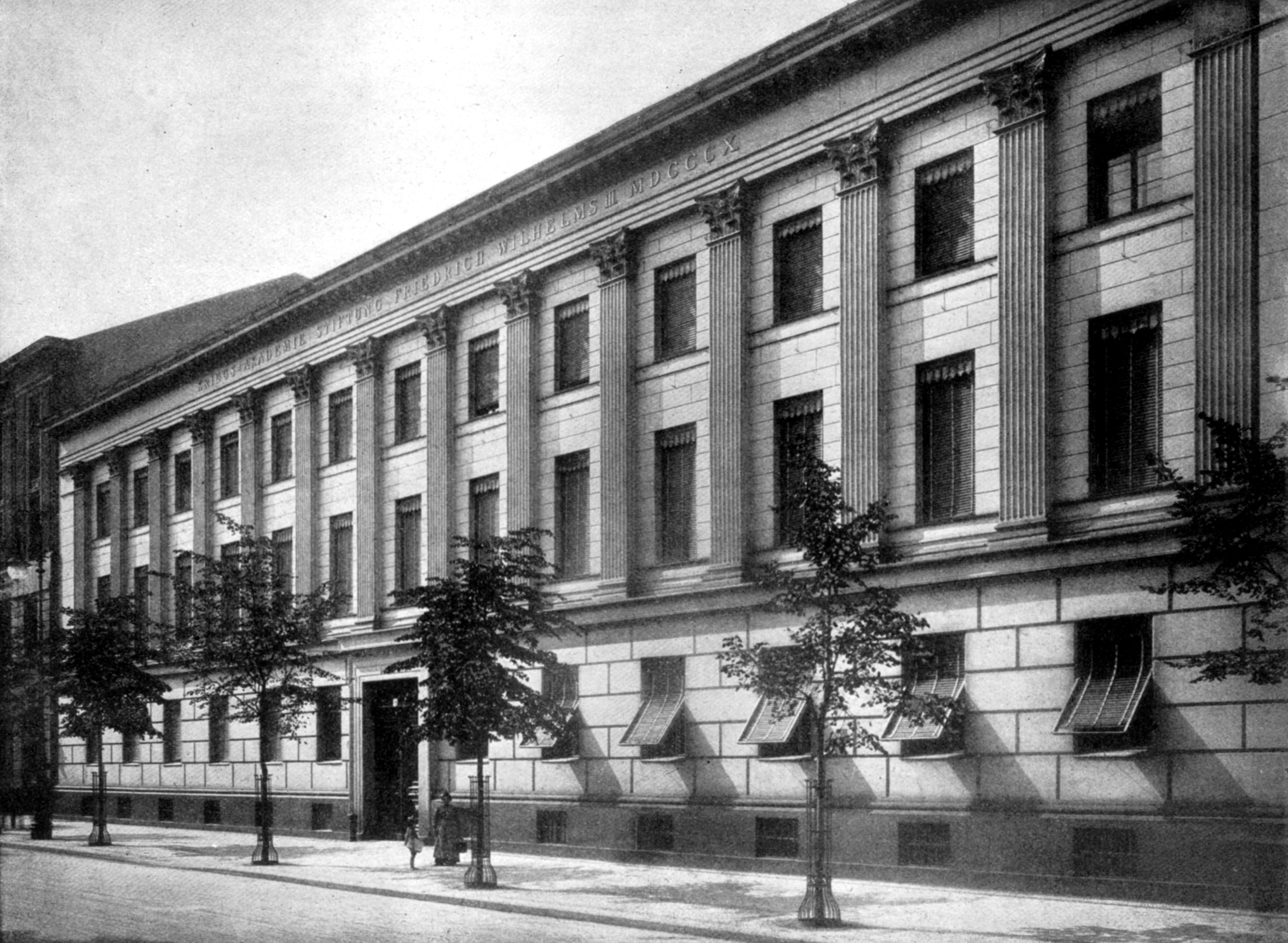
The Prussian Kriegsakademie in Berlin

The recruitment and training of officers in the German army was a strictly structured and elitist process that was closely intertwined with the social hierarchy and political structures of the empire. The Prussian-influenced army was regarded as one of the central institutions of the empire and placed high demands on its officers. The officer's career was closely linked to the social elite. It was primarily open to men from the nobility and the upper middle classes. Particularly in Prussia, which played the dominant role in the German army, the officer corps was a bastion of the nobility. Between 60 and 70 percent of the officers in the Prussian army came from noble families.

Around a third of the officers came from the cadet corps, who left the "Oberskunda" at the age of 17 and took the ‘Fähnrich’ exam after seven months of service to be accepted into the "Kriegsschule". Around two-thirds of officers came from the ranks of the Fahnenjunker. To be accepted into a regiment under this status, certain requirements had to be met in terms of age (17 to 21 years), physical aptitude, education, income and general fitness. Upon presentation of certificates confirming that these conditions had been met, the corps commander announced the applicant's acceptance as a Fahnenjunker at the first available post after he had served 6 or 8 months as a private or ensign in the troops. Some reserve officers, who were specially authorized by the Emperor and had certain qualifications, were allowed to take the officer's examination after a longer period of training in a regiment, but without going through a war college, and received their commission after a positive vote from the officers of their regiment.

In very rare cases, non-commissioned officers who had distinguished themselves in action could be appointed officers without an examination, provided they had already achieved the rank of Feldwebel or Vizefeldwebels. At the end of the war college course, the cadets and junior officers took the officer's examination. If they passed, they returned to their regiment and waited for the first lieutenant's post to become vacant. The professional and technical training of the young officers was then continued in special weapons schools, Spandau (infantry), Hanover (cavalry), Jüterborg (artillery). A certain number of carefully selected officers were later sent to the war academy and, as in peacetime, the army tried to preserve the character of the caste in its officer corps when appointments were made in the field by only accepting the same social class. The active officers were therefore recruited from the officer cadets and from the volunteer soldiers of the higher social classes, who had been provided in large numbers by the 1914, 1915 and 1916 cohorts since the beginning of the war.

To fill the numerous gaps in the ranks of active officers, other groups of people had to be recruited. However, as they were not to be retained as officers after a war, those who came from the social classes from which reserve officers were to be recruited in peacetime were appointed as reserve officers. In the end, recourse was made to the appointment of sergeant lieutenants and deputy officers, who were selected wherever possible from men who would no longer be part of the active army after the war. Thus, active non-commissioned officers could not be appointed as sergeant lieutenants (a rank awarded by the Emperor), but only as deputy officers (an appointment that could be revoked by the regimental commander if the need no longer existed).

Reserve and Landwehr officers were selected either from former active officers who were without employment or from one-year volunteers. The latter were referred to as "officer candidates" after they had passed a theoretical and practical examination during their year of service. Over the following two years, they had to complete two training courses of eight weeks each, after which they were recommended by the corps commander for appointment as a reserve officer and could be commissioned following a vote by the district's reserve officer corps. Other non-commissioned officers and men of the reserve and the Landwehr were recruited from among those who had distinguished themselves in action, provided they were already sergeants, deputy sergeants, constables or deputy constables. All these appointments could only be made after a vote of the officer corps concerned and after very serious investigations into the morale of the candidate and his family.

NCOs were recruited via the NCO schools, which you could enter at the age of 17. After two years of study, the boy was sent to the troops with the rank of non-commissioned officer (they were preparatory schools for the non-commissioned officer schools). Soldiers who re-enlisted during their service in the troops could also be made NCOs by re-enlistment. A certain number of NCO schools remained, especially behind the front, where NCO courses had been set up, usually one for a division or army corps.

== Uniforms ==
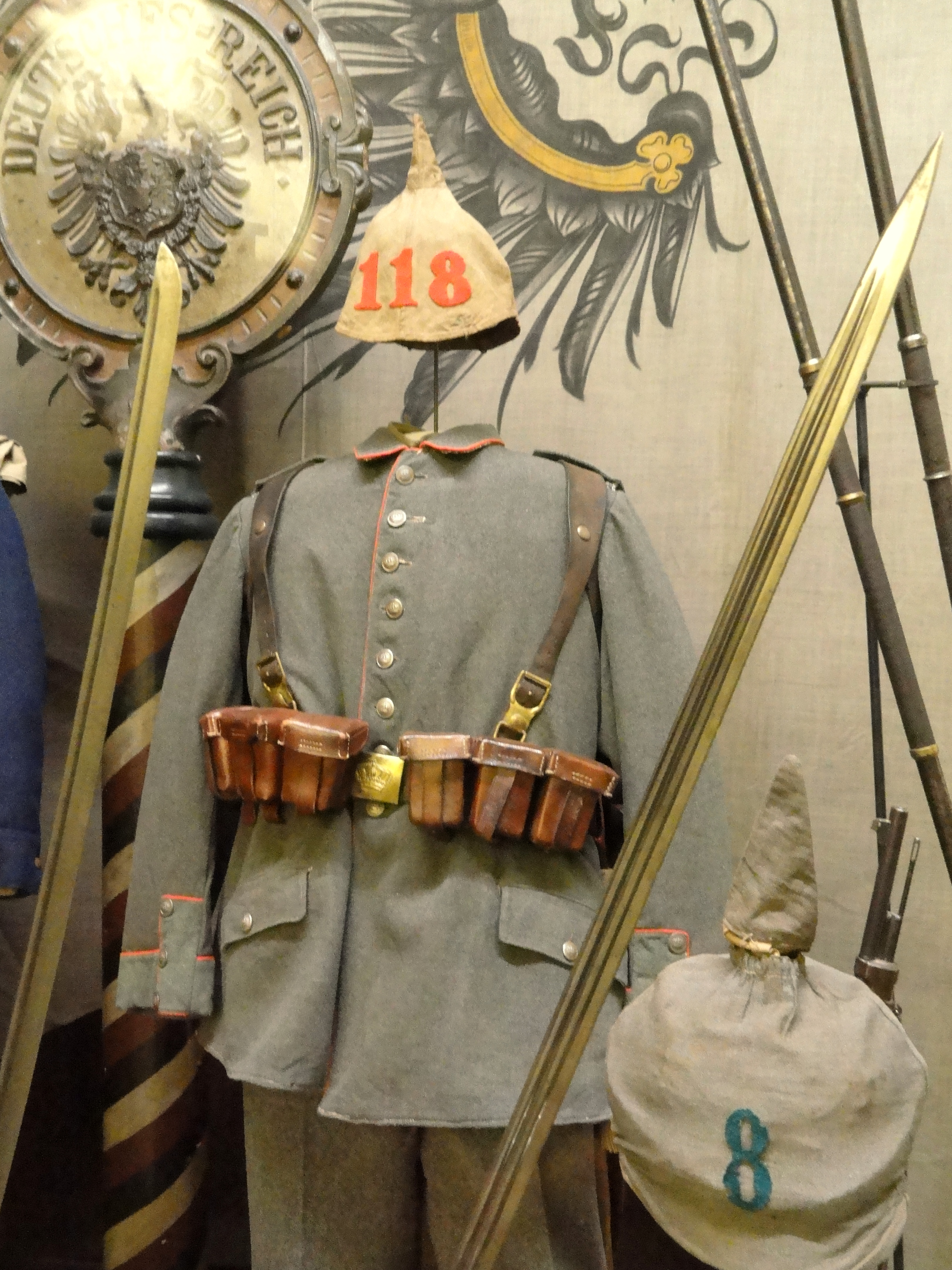
grey field uniform of 1910

From 1914, the entire Regular Army wore the 1910 field uniform, which had also been produced in sufficient quantity to clothe most of the Reserve and Landwehr, although there were cases where some of the latter units wore blue uniforms or a mixture of blue and field grey at mobilization. The Landsturm units did not wear field gray uniforms in 1914, but by early 1915 most of these troops had been re-dressed. This first field uniform of the German army was produced in two colors: in green-grey, which was worn by the Jäger battalions, the machine gun divisions and the Jäger zu Pferde, and in field grey for the rest of the army. However, the widespread image of a uniform German army, which was dressed in the same uniform throughout at the outbreak of war, is incorrect, firstly because of the many national variations and secondly because many branches of the army had adopted the differences in the full uniform of their respective branches of the armed forces.

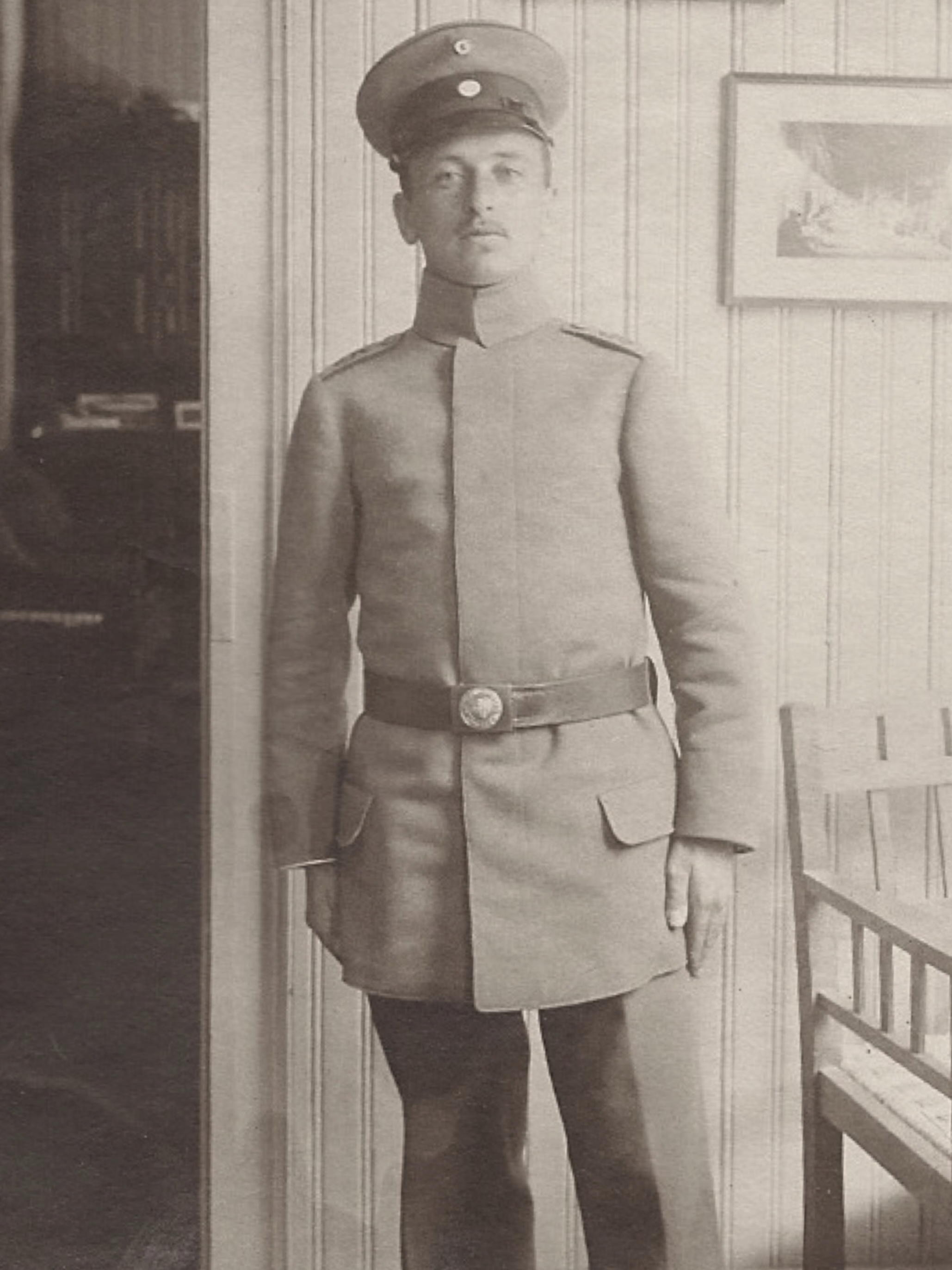
the new field uniform from 1915

The basic garment was a loose coat with eight buttons down the front and pockets on the skirts. The issued tunics were marked with the letters "B.A.", Roman numerals and unit symbols. Scarlet piping was used for infantry and machine gunners, green for Jägers and black for riflemen and the 2nd artillery and sappers wore red piping, while medical troops wore dark blue piping. There were also unit insignia. The officers' uniforms were custom-made, with rank insignia and regimental insignia on the shoulder. General staff officers wore a special service jacket with red cuffs and flaps. Due to the war, some older officers wore outdated uniforms. Cuirassiers, dragoons and Jäger zu Pferde wore jackets similar to the tunic, with stand-up collars and piping in regimental colors. Hussar units wore a field gray attila, hussar units wore a field gray ulanka, and chaplains wore a long frock coat. They also wore field gray braided piping.

The jacket buttons of the Bavarian units were embossed with a lion and usually bore the national crown of the respective unit. Most regiments began the war with tombac buttons, an alloy of zinc and copper with a reddish brass coating. Some units, especially the Guards, wore buttons made of nickel. The four main cuff patterns of the tunic were the Brandenburg, Swedish, Saxon and French. The Brandenburg cuff had an elongated, vertical flap with three buttons, while the Saxon cuff had two buttons, one below and one above the piping. The Swedish cuff had two buttons arranged horizontally below the piping.

Collar and cuff braids, small decorative strips of fabric, were traditionally associated with the Guards and other higher regiments of the army. They were worn on the collar and extended to a point at the height of the shoulder strap button. The three main patterns were "double", "single" and "old Prussian". The braids were usually white with a red center line, except for the Fusilier Regiment 80, the Guards and 14th Jäger Battalions as well as the Guards Riflemen and the 2nd Guards Machine Gunners. Guards machine-gunners were unusual in that the area between their double yellow braids was filled in red or black, depending on whether they of the 1st or 2nd Guards Regiments, Guards Fusiliers, Grenadier Regiments, Guards Chasseurs, Riflemen and Machine-Gun Divisions wore double braids. The names of the units and army corps could be determined by the buttoned-down shoulder strap of the original 1910 tunic. The shoulder piece of a regiment was a rank symbol on which the regimental number or monogram was sewn in red. For example, the tunic shoulder strap of the Württembergisches Grenadier-Regiment Königin Olga bore a crown above the monogram O. The Guards Grenadier Regiment Nr. 1 wore an A under an imperial crown and a small number 1. The Fusilier Regiment 34 bore a stylized, crowned V.

In addition to these monograms, there was a series of letters and symbols, mostly in red, which denoted the types of troops. For example, the artillery carried grenades, the Saxon hunters and riflemen carried hunting horns and the Saxon pioneers carried crossed picks and shovels. Aircraft units wore stylized wings and propellants. The shoulder piece was also used to mark one-year-olds, men who agreed to serve for a year and pay their own expenses. Landsturm units had shoulder marks according to the type of weapon: blue for infantry, black for sappers, scarlet for field artillery and yellow for foot artillery. The units were identified by brass numerals on the collar, with the numbers of the army corps in Roman and those of the battalions in Arabic numbers. The pants of the infantry were to match the colors of the jackets, with red or green piping for the hunters. Field gray breeches were prescribed for the cavalry, while the hussars had braid stripes. Officers were instructed to wear similar pants to the enlisted men, possibly to prevent enemy snipers from having too easy a game.

In 1915, a new field service uniform was first introduced in the Prussian Army, which was adopted by the entire German army at the beginning of 1916. The most important innovation in the 1915 uniform was the introduction of the blouse. This garment with simple turn-down cuffs, plain aprons and concealed buttons at the front was to replace all tunics from 1910. Modified braids of grey or yellow woven cotton were sewn onto the turn-down collar, reflecting the style and color scheme of the older types.

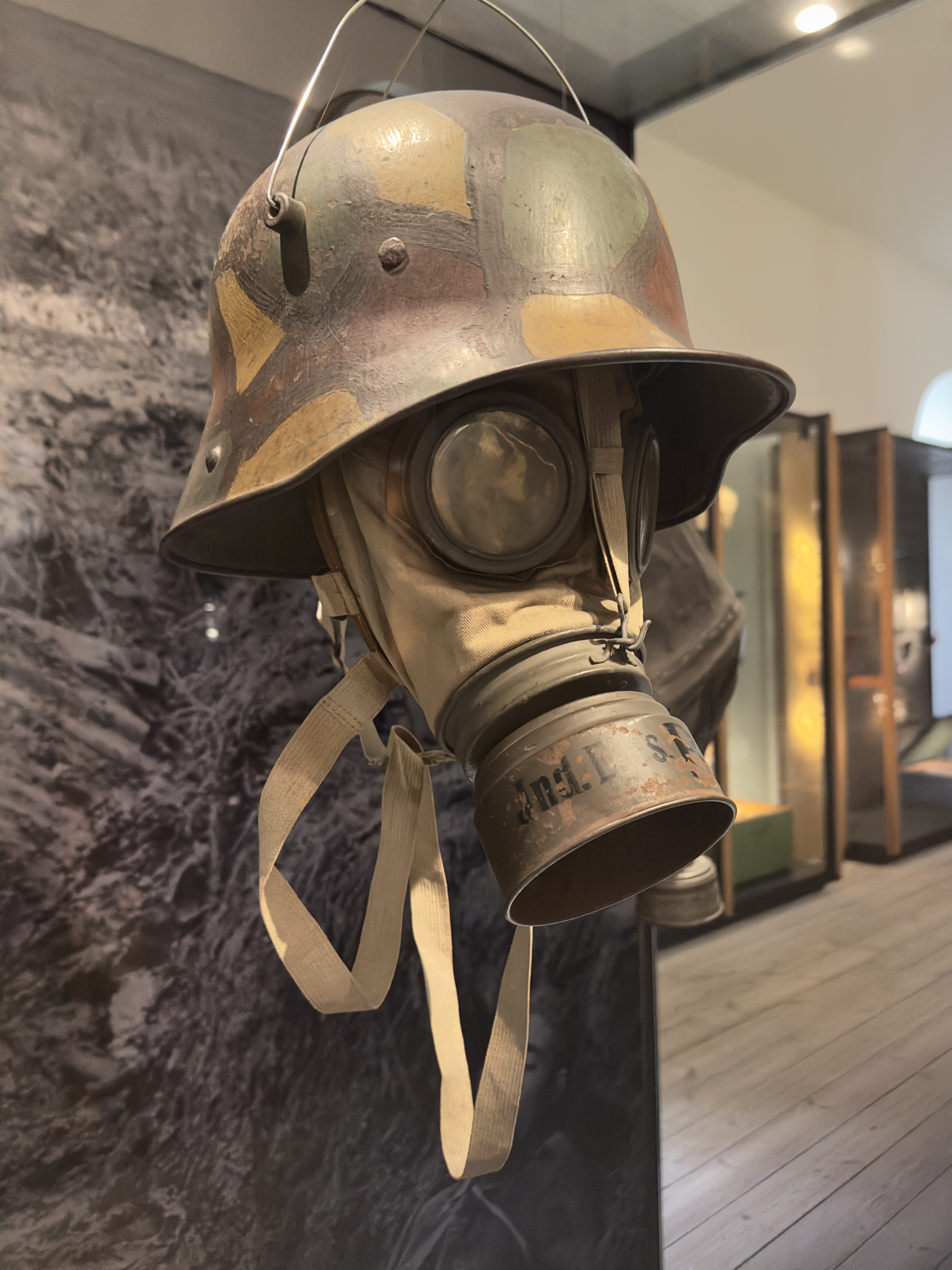
M16 steel helmet with camouflage paint

All Bavarian units wore a thin blue and white checkered ribbon sewn around the edge of the collar, the only other distinguishing feature of the blouse being the shoulder pieces. Although these corresponded to the traditional color scheme, they differed significantly from those of the uniforms based on the 1910 pattern; although they were no longer piped in the corps colors, they still bore regimental numbers and numerals. The coloring of the shoulder straps essentially indicated the branch of arms, and in some cases the piping differentiated the regiment. The hussars continued to wear the shoulder marks according to the 1910 pattern. Features such as rank insignia remained unchanged on the 1915 uniform, but the wearing of professional or merit badges and swallow's nests was banned.

The soldiers wore various helmets such as the Pickelhaube, which was made of leather with metal decorations and cockades (imperial cockade on the right, national cockade on the left), as well as chakos, chapkas or kolpaks. The helmets were adorned with crest plates, the design of which varied depending on the state and regiment, for example with the Prussian eagle, the Bavarian coat of arms or the Hessian lion. Artillerymen distinguished themselves by having balls instead of spikes on their helmets. Hunter and cavalry units had specific helmet types such as the lobster tail helmets for heavy cavalry or chapkas for Uhlans. Officers' helmets were of higher quality, with longer spikes, metal scale straps and sometimes made of special materials such as gray opossum fur for kolpaks.

All helmets were covered in green cloth with regimental numbers. Reserve and Landwehr units also had an "R", Landsturm units an "L". These markings were initially red, but were changed to green after the start of the war. Field caps, which were also part of the uniform, were kept in the basic color of the uniform and decorated with colored ribbons and piping, which often reflected the colors of the uniform piping. Cuirassier regiments and hussars had specially decorated caps that matched the colors of their parade uniforms. The conditions of war led to further adaptations to the equipment. From spring 1916, the steel helmet was introduced, which was initially painted field grey, but was later often painted in camouflage colors. In addition, soldiers often made their own helmet covers from sandbags. Body armor was also introduced in the same year, but was mainly used by trench guards due to its heavy weight. Special clothing was developed for tank crews, mountain troops and airmen, as well as sheepskin coats for winter on the Eastern Front and lightweight uniforms for hot climates such as Macedonia or the Middle East.

== Ranks ==
Ranks and rank insignia, Imperial Army – Germany until 1918
description	Flag officer						Senior officer			Junior officer	
Shoulder insignia											
Rank	Generalfeldmarschall	Generaloberst	General	Generalleutnant	Generalmajor	Oberst	Oberstleutnant	Major	Hauptmann, Rittmeister	Oberleutnant	Leutnant

Rank	Command
Generalfeldmarschall	Army group
Generaloberst	Field army
General	Army corps
Generalleutnant	Division
Generalmajor	Brigade
Oberst	Regiment
Oberstleutnant	Second in command of a regiment
Major	Battalion
Hauptmann	Company

== Pay ==
The pay in the German Army was divided into Gehalt for officers and Löhnung for NCO's and men. In peace time there were various allowances such as Kommandogeld, Stellenzulage and Tischgeld. Officers pay was credited monthly in advance on the first day of each month. The pay of NCO's and men was credited on the 1st 11th and 21st of each month reckoned every month at 30 days. On becoming recruit each received an allowance for Putzzeug, amounting to 7.10 respectively 8.80 Reichsmark for mounted men. Special allowances and rates of pay were granted to officers and other ranks of the Beurlaubtenstand, when called up for training or maneuvers. On 21 December 1917, the rates of pay for non-commissioned officers were raised by 20 per cent, and for men by 33 per cent. On 1 August 1918, a further increase was sanctioned by the Emperor. Officers who were injured in action received a Verstümmelungszulage (mutilation allowance) for the duration of this condition: 900 Reichsmark per year for the loss of a hand, a foot, speech, hearing in both ears and 1800 Reichsmark per year for the loss or blindness of both eyes. The mutilation allowance of 900 RM per year could also be granted in the event of impaired mobility and use of a hand, an arm, a foot or a leg, in the event of loss or blindness of one eye if the other eye was not fully functional, as well as in the event of other serious health impairments if care was required. If one of these health impairments caused severe infirmity or mental illness, the simple mutilation allowance could be increased up to 1800. Officers who were entitled to a pension as a result of a war injury were entitled to an annual war allowance of 720 to 1200 Reichsmarks. A Pferdegeld (horse allowance) of RM 19.94 was granted for the procurement of horses for service.

Flag officer
Rank	
General and Generaloberst	1165 ℛℳ
Generalleutnant	1129 ℛℳ
Generalmajor	855 ℛℳ
Brigadegeneral	755 ℛℳ

Senior officer
Rank	
Oberst	731 ℛℳ
Oberstleutnant	546 ℛℳ
Major	546 ℛℳ

Junior officer
Rank	Time of Service												
	1 year	2 years	3 years	4 years	5 years	6 years	7 years	8 years	9 years	10 years	11 years	12 years	13 years
Hauptmann	283 ℛℳ	"" ℛℳ	"" ℛℳ	"" ℛℳ	383 ℛℳ	""	""	""	425 ℛℳ				
Oberleutnant	125 ℛℳ	""	""	141 ℛℳ	""	""	158 ℛℳ	""	""	175 ℛℳ	""	""	200 ℛℳ
Leutnant	125 ℛℳ	""	""	141 ℛℳ	""	""	158 ℛℳ	""	""	175 ℛℳ	""	""	200 ℛℳ

Non-commissioned officers
Rank	
Feldwebel	62 ℛℳ
Vizefeldwebel more than 9 1/2 years of service	47 ℛℳ
Sergeant more than 9 1/2 years of service	47 ℛℳ
Sergeant more than 5 1/2 years of service	39 ℛℳ
Fähnrich less than 5 1/2 years of service	25 ℛℳ

Enlisted rank
Rank	
Obergefreiter	15 ℛℳ
Gefreiter	10 ℛℳ
Gemeiner	9 ℛℳ

== Promotion ==
The promotion of officers was the prerogative of the sovereigns of the four kingdoms of Prussia, Bavaria, Saxony and Württemberg. The first principle of promotion was that the promoted officer had to be suitable in every respect for his new position. Even in peacetime, this was determined by inspection and not by examination. Except in the general staff, promotion up to the rank of captain or major took place within the regiment. Above the rank of major, promotion took place via a general list.

In the German army, promotion was relatively slow in peacetime compared to other European armies, but accelerated slightly for the lower ranks during the war. For example, the average age of promotion for a lieutenant in peacetime was 29 years, whereas in wartime it fell to 25 years. A captain was promoted on average at the age of 36 in peacetime and 29 in wartime. The promotion age for a major was 45 in peacetime and 42 in wartime, while a lieutenant colonel was promoted at 52 in peacetime and 50 in wartime. The higher ranks, on the other hand, remained unchanged or changed only minimally. A colonel was promoted at the age of 54 in both peacetime and wartime. The promotion age for a major general was 58 in peacetime and 57 in wartime. Lieutenant generals and generals were promoted at 61 and 65 respectively in both cases.

The names, ranks and appointments of the officers were documented in the annual ranking list. The Bavarian and Saxon armies kept separate lists. Promotions, appointments and transfers were published in the Reichsanzeiger under the heading Personnel Changes. In peacetime, a certain number of senior non-commissioned officers were promoted to the rank of commissioned officer upon mobilization and given the title of field lieutenant.

During the war, all branches of the armed forces had the option of filling vacant lieutenant positions with the rank of sergeant by promoting sergeants or second sergeants who had retired before the war after 12 years of service. The award required an impeccable character and an appropriate position in civilian life. It was also possible to promote non-commissioned officers of good repute who had retired after eight years of service to the rank of field lieutenant in the Landsturm formations, provided they were not suitable for active service.

== Living conditions ==
Rations for German soldiers in the First World War were divided into various categories, which differed depending on the situation: Peacetime rations, wartime rations and iron portions. The peacetime rations consisted of daily rations containing a combination of bread, meat and vegetables. For example, 750 g of bread or a corresponding amount of rusk and 180 g of raw meat or alternatives such as bacon or tinned meat were available. This was supplemented by pulses, rice or tinned vegetables as well as smaller quantities of coffee and salt. The coarse peace rations were somewhat more extensive and offered higher quantities of meat and fat.

The war rations were adapted to the conditions of war and also included bread or rusks as a basis, as well as salted or smoked meat, bacon or tinned meat. Vegetables and potatoes were available in smaller quantities, with durable products such as dried vegetables or canned food being used more frequently. The portions of meat and vegetables could be increased in the event of exceptional exertion, and coffee, tea or brandy could also be served. The iron portion was an emergency ration that soldiers carried with them at all times. It consisted of rusks, tinned meat and tinned vegetables.

However, this ration was low in calories and was not sufficient to cover the soldiers' nutritional requirements in the long term, which is why it had to be supplemented by purchases in the canteen or the consumption of alcohol. The restrictions on the iron portion resulted from the aim of keeping the weight of the rations carried as low as possible, and overall the rations were designed to provide the soldiers with as many calories as possible. Nevertheless, prolonged dependence on emergency rations resulted in deficiencies, which were to be compensated for by a later, more substantial intake.

== Medical Service ==
Ranks of Medical Officers
Rank	Relative rank as	Charge
Generalstabsarzt	Generalleutnant	Medical inspector general
Obergeneralarzt	Generalmajor	Field army
Generalarzt	Oberst	Army corps
Generaloberarzt	Oberstleutnant	Division
Oberstabsarzt	Major	Regiment
Stabsarzt	Hauptmann	Battalion
Oberarzt	Oberleutnant	Battalion
Assistenzarzt	Leutnant	Assistant Surgeon

During the First World War, medical care for troops was clearly structured. Each larger unit, such as infantry, fighter or artillery battalions, was assigned at least one doctor, who either had the rank of Oberstabsarzt or Stabsarzt, supported by another doctor. Cavalry regiments also had a regimental doctor and two assistant doctors, while smaller independent units, such as pioneer companies or telephone divisions, each had an assistant doctor. Within the regiments, the highest-ranking battalion doctor also took on the role of regimental doctor. As the war progressed, additional medical posts were created for technical troops such as aviation and motorized units.

Even before the start of the war, the number of active medical officers was insufficient to fill all the planned posts. With the mobilization and the massive expansion of the army through reserve and Landsturm troops, this shortage became considerably worse. The active corps of medical officers was only able to fill a fraction of the medical posts required, as experienced doctors were also needed to run field hospitals and medical companies. Many posts therefore had to be filled by reservists or contract doctors. Over the course of the war, losses due to death, injury or illness led to further shortages that could not be fully compensated for. To fill the gaps, less qualified doctors such as field auxiliaries and Feldunterarzt were increasingly deployed. On less contested sections of the front, some positions even remained permanently vacant.

Active medical officers were well prepared for service in the field thanks to their time in peacetime, as they were familiar with the demands of combat through maneuvers and exercises. Reservists and less experienced doctors, on the other hand, first had to get used to the challenges of military medical service, as many of them had previously worked mainly in military hospitals or civilian hospitals. The adjustment was particularly difficult for contracted doctors who had no previous military experience. The medical teams were recruited from the active military in peacetime. During the winter semester, they received theoretical and practical training at a medical school attached to a larger garrison hospital, which ended with a final examination. After passing the exam, they were taken on as ambulance crews. The reserve medical teams also included medical students, who were released into the reserve as supernumerary privates after six months of military service, unless they had already been promoted to field surgeon. In addition to the active medical teams, reservists and members of the Landwehr and Landsturm were also available for mobilization.

In the field army, each company, squadron, battery, column or similar unit was assigned a medical sergeant. In the cavalry regiments, which were part of the cavalry division, there were a total of six medical sergeants for every four squadrons. The number of medical NCOs was increased during the course of the war. Each infantry, infantry or rifle battalion was assigned an additional medical NCO, whose responsibilities included the administration of the ambulance and the written duties of the battalion doctor. The medical personnel were also increased in the cavalry, field artillery and engineer formations.

Each company of infantry, jäger or riflemen had four orderlies. These were specially trained soldiers who were prepared for their tasks as part of the orderly training. These orderlies were part of the medical staff and wore Red Cross armbands. In addition, auxiliary orderlies from the ranks of the regular troops who had also taken part in orderly training were called up as required. However, they were only called up on special orders from the troop commander. In the foot troops in particular, musicians and auxiliary musicians were trained as auxiliary orderlies as standard and were deployed for these tasks if necessary. As auxiliary orderlies were only temporarily active in the ambulance service, they were given a red armband instead of a white one.

The equipment of the medical service was designed to enable both the rapid initial treatment of the wounded and the transportation of the injured. A central component was the carrying of bandages and medicines. Dressing materials were carried in the form of compact compresses, while medicines were mainly provided as tablets – a measure introduced early on by the army administration, which later also became widespread in civilian medicine. All soldiers in the field army were equipped with two bandage packs. These contained a sterile gauze bandage with a sewn-on gauze compress, which was designed so that it could be applied hygienically without direct contact with the fingers. Instructions were integrated into the waterproof cover. In addition, troop medics were required to carry their own pocket kit with the most important medical equipment and medication. Medical teams were equipped with medical bags, bandages and bottles of rennet.

The medical bags differed in models for mounted and unmounted forces. Unmounted medics wore two small leather bags on their belts, while mounted medics carried a larger bag over their shoulder. The bags contained bandages and medicines for first aid. Orderlies also carried medical bags, but these were only filled with bandages. Medical knapsacks, panniers, medical boxes and ambulances were used to transport larger quantities of medical supplies. Each infantry, hunter and rifle unit had an infantry ambulance, while the cavalry regiments of the cavalry division had a cavalry ambulance. The latter differed in that the cavalry ambulance had space for two lying wounded, while the infantry ambulance did not.

Medical wagons carried a variety of materials, including troop cutlery, bandages, toolboxes, blankets and collapsible stretchers. Medical knapsacks, which were carried by stretcher bearers, contained the most important first aid supplies, such as elastic bandages, splints, bandage trays and frequently needed medication. Each filled knapsack weighed around 11 kg. The cavalry also carried medical kit bags on packhorses, which mainly contained bandages and some medicines. An emergency stretcher was also attached to the bags. At the beginning of the war, each cavalry regiment had two packhorses, the number of which was doubled per squadron in 1917.

Medical supply wagons were used to ensure the supply of materials for medical kit bags and wagons. They also transported medical rations, tent material, emergency stretchers and other equipment. Medical kits, which were used by higher staffs, machine-gun formations and smaller units, contained a larger selection of bandages, medicines and aids and were transported on troop vehicles. Each unit equipped with first-aid kits also carried a collapsible stretcher. In addition, woolen bandages and blankets were part of the medical equipment. During the winter, the number of bandages carried was doubled, and each soldier in the infantry was given a bandage to cope with the special climatic conditions. This equipment helped to ensure that the troops received medical care even under difficult conditions.

== Tactics ==
The infantry tactics were based on the deutsche Felddienstordnung von 1887 (Fieldservice order of 1887) and the Reglement für die Infantrie von 1888 (Infrantry Regulations of 1888). By 1914 the infantry attack consisted of three phases: the deployment (Aufmarsch), which involved forming up or joining forces, the formation (Entfaltung), which involved deployment, and the development (Entwicklung), which involved expansion. The deployment took place at a distance of 2,200 m from the enemy, depending on the terrain. In the deployment phase, battalion or company formations are deployed in platoons and sections to widen the front. In the development phase, the entire unit is deployed in battle lines to widen the front. The final attack formation consisted of three lines: a firing line, its supports and its reserves, each 270 meters apart. The tactical system was well suited to the conditions of 1914 and proved its worth against the continental armies. However, it proved inadequate against the British Expeditionary Force.

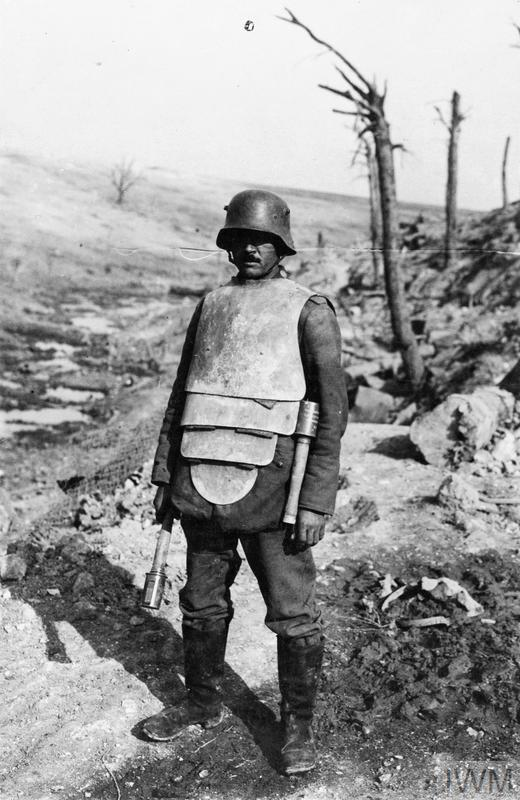
Soldier of a storm trooper unit at the Somme in 1916 with body armor

Until 1918, the OHL worked on the organizational and tactical modernization of the army for both types of combat, defence and attack. This had a decisive influence on the development of German land warfare in the second half of the war. During the same period, the training and education of the troops was also significantly improved. The basis for this was the combat experience gained, which was now combined with the previous methods of warfare in refined command and training regulations. The focus of this modernization process was particularly on mechanized positional warfare on the main front in the west. In contrast, the situation in the east was much more conducive to old-style warfare. Cavalry was often deployed in mobile combat or the defense was conducted statically from a single line. The innovative combat experience that was successfully applied in the capture of Riga or the breakthrough of Flitsch-Tolmein was nevertheless important for tactical development. These included shock troop tactics and massed artillery fire.

The German army had long been studying the experiences of its opponents and had incorporated the writings of the French officer André Laffargue into its strategy. These included "Die Grundsätze für die Führung in der Abwehrschlacht im Stellungskriege" (December 1916, March and September 1917), "Der Angriff im Stellungskrieg" (January 1918) and "Ausbildungsvorschrift für die Fußtruppen im Kriege" (January 1917 and January 1918). The German army's approach to defense was improved by combining elements of fire and movement, with the development of both elements leading to a single interaction. This led to the principle of deep, elastic space defense, which complemented but did not completely replace the previous method. Its allowed the defenders a limited tactical retreat in a defensive zone with pockets of resistance. This was intended to ensure a certain degree of protection against the devastating artillery fire of the attacker.

In contrast to the Western Allies, they refrained from preparing attacks with days of artillery fire from 1916 onwards. The tank also played no major role in the OHL's considerations. Instead, the German army aimed to achieve a breakthrough through a combination of the elements of surprise, initiative and improved interaction between infantry, artillery and air force. The element of surprise was created by a short, initially centrally led and suddenly opened fire raid by individual artillery groups. As soon as the attack began, it turned into a dense hail of shells that slowly spread over the enemy positions according to a fixed schedule, the so-called fire roll. It was first used by the Germans in 1916 on the Eastern Front, but also in front of Verdun. The targeted artillery fire was intended to keep the enemy infantry and artillery equally in check and paralyze the command structures. The method was largely based on the experience of Lieutenant Colonel Georg Bruchmüller.

Bruchmüller had distinguished himself in offensive operations on the eastern front, including at Riga in 1917, and acted as an advisor to the OHL for the spring offensives of 1918. A procedure developed by Captain Erich Pulkowski and integrated into this artillery guidance ensured that the previously time-consuming and treacherous sighting in of the guns was no longer necessary. Immediately behind the fire roller followed combat groups reinforced with artillery and pioneers. Their task was to penetrate and break through the enemy's weak points with rapid movements. Only then were the reserves to follow.

Specially equipped, mobile mob divisions were planned for the offensive operations in 1918. Within the divisions, small battle groups equipped with troop weapons (including light machine guns) were intended for the main combat activity. The training of leaders and troops was promoted by an extensive network of schools, training grounds and courses set up by the OHL. The further developed operational principles were applied. In addition to the numerous training courses for enlisted men, non-commissioned officers and officers, special training courses for commanders and general staff officers were offered by individual army groups in 1917/18. In these courses, the responsible military personnel at the front were taught the basics of defensive battle and attack in positional warfare.

The implementation of new tactics in the war effort remained ambivalent, as there was a lack of clear guidelines for leadership and training. Despite the standardization, these were compromise solutions that combined the new and the old in a variety of ways, but at the same time continued to strictly reject schematization. Although training and ethics were freed from rigid inertia, the flexible application of innovations was not fully implemented. Modernization was viewed critically by many commanders. Soldiers were not trusted to implement complex tactical procedures. Many officers even feared that ordinary soldiers would flee if they were allowed to take evasive action.

== Equipment ==
=== Small arms and rifles ===
The ordnance rifle of the German army was the Gewehr 98, which had a 740 mm barrel for caliber: 7.92 × 57 mm and a quadrant sighting system designed by Lange. The rifle also had an adjustable leather sling, a muzzle guard with flap and was fitted with the 98 bayonet. Minor modifications were made during World War I, including the 98/05 model for rifles and carbines.In 1900, the German cavalry introduced a shortened version of the Gewehr 98 to replace the Karabiner 88, a modern weapon compatible with other units. The Mauser System 98 replaced the Gewehr 91 and allowed soldiers to assemble weapons into pyramids. In 1902, the carbine with mounting device for Seitengewehr 98 was introduced, with a barrel length of 435 mm and a different stock. The "extended carbine 98 with mounting and connecting device" was introduced in 1908, with a barrel length of 590 mm, an angled bolt handle, a full stock, a hand guard, a spike and a hinged top ring. During the First World War, it was a popular alternative to the Gewehr 98, proved useful in trench warfare and was issued mainly to assault troops.

The standard handgun of the German army was the Pistole 08, an automatic pistol better known as the Luger or Parabellum. This weapon was a further development of the Borchardt, which had been brought to Germany by its American designer in the early 1890s. It was adopted by the German navy in 1906, and another model was approved by the army in August 1908. The caliber of this weapon was 9 mm, its weight 800 g and the grip contained an eight-round magazine. A 32-round slug magazine was produced, which could be attached to the base of the grip. Both long and short barrels were used during the war, with the maximum range of the former being around 1,500 m.There were also a number of other handguns such as the Reichsrevolver M79 and M83, the Dreyse M1907, the Langenhan army pistol, the Mauser C96, and the Mauser Model 1914.

=== Grenades ===
The army had three types of grenades, a time fuse grenade, a percussion grenade and a rifle grenade. The Kugelhandgranate model 1913, with a brass fuse, and the Diskushandgranate model 1913 with an impact fuse. The most widely used German grenade was the M15 stick grenade with time fuse. It consisted of a cylindrical steel head containing the explosive, a wooden handle, a friction fuse and a detonator. There were two main types of rifle grenades, the 1913 and 1914 models, which weighed around 1 kg.

=== Machine guns ===
The standard machine gun was the 08 heavy machine gun introduced in 1908. It was water-cooled and fired the same 7.92 mm caliber ammunition as the Gewehr 98. Together with the cooling water, it had a weight of 63 kg. The maximum range was 4000 m. To have a more manageable machine gun for trench warfare, the 08/15 light machine gun was introduced in 1915. It was based on the 08 machine gun; it was also water-cooled and also fired 7.92 mm ammunition. Together with the cooling water, it had a weight of 19.5 kg. An air-cooled version, the 08/18 machine gun, was built in 1918. It used a barrel with a slim perforated jacket and weighed about 15 kg. In addition to the machine guns, the army also had various submachine guns such as the Madsen or the Bergmann MP18.

=== Artillery ===
The main field artillery weapons in the German army were the 7.7 cm field gun and the 10.5 cm howitzer. In 1914, the new type 96 field gun (Feldkanone 96 n.A.), also known as the C96 n.A., was the standard weapon of the field batteries. At the beginning of the war, the German army had 5,608 of these field guns. The barrel length was 27.3 caliber. The operating crew was protected by a flat, 1.68-meter high shield, the upper part of which was hinged. The entire field gun had a weight of 876 kilograms, 426 kilograms of which was accounted for by the mount. The aiming limits were an elevation of +16° and an elevation of −12°, the maximum range was 8,400 meters.

A new field gun was introduced in 1916, replacing many field artillery batteries. The Feldkanone 16 (FK16) was similar to the C96 n.A., but had an extended barrel length of 35 calibers. It was mounted on a modified mount for the 10.5 cm light howitzer, which allowed an elevation of up to +38°. The field gun 16 weighed 1,247 kilograms, had a muzzle velocity of 600 meters per second and a maximum range of 10,300 meters. The standard field howitzer was the 10.5 cm light field howitzer 98/09 (leFH 98/09), which was put into service in 1910. By the spring of 1914, the entire field artillery was equipped with this howitzer. In 1914, the German army had 1,260 of these howitzers.

The gun weighed a total of 1,143 kilograms and was mounted on an armored recoil mount. The gun had a maximum range of 7,000 meters with an elevation of +40° and a side aiming range of 8°. During the war, two further models of the 10.5 cm howitzer were introduced, but these did not replace the leFH 98/09. The first was the leFH 16, which had a longer barrel and an enlarged powder chamber. These changes enabled a maximum range of 10,000 meters when the so-called streamlined shell (C projectile) was used. The second model was the Krupp light field howitzer (leFH Krupp), which had a maximum range of 10,250 meters. Both howitzers used the mount of the leFH 98/09.

Three types of heavy artillery emerged in the early years of the First World War: siege guns, railroad guns and coastal guns. The early German railroad guns and coastal guns were generally derived from the existing naval artillery, but had new mounts for their different tasks. The pinnacle of artillery firepower in 1914 was Krupp's 420-mm Gamma gun, better known as Dicke Bertha. This stationary howitzer fired a 760 kg projectile up to 13 km. It was therefore ideal for positional warfare, especially for firing at fortifications. To achieve a greater range, some surplus 38 cm naval guns were used as railroad or bedding guns against the French fortifications along the border.

=== Aircraft ===
Germany produced a total of around 48,000 aircraft during World War I. This figure includes all types of aircraft, including fighters, reconnaissance aircraft, bombers, and training aircraft, which played crucial roles during the First World War. Among the fighters, the Albatros D.II, D.III, D.V, and D.Va featured streamlined wooden monocoque fuselages and were powered by the Mercedes D.III inline-six engine, delivering around 160 hp. The Fokker D.I through Fokker D.V series were early biplane fighters that transitioned from rotary engines to more powerful inline engines. The Fokker D.VII, often considered one of the best fighters of the war, was equipped with a BMW IIIa or Mercedes D.IIIa engine and used a thick airfoil for high maneuverability and excellent performance at altitude.

The Fokker Dr.I, a triplane, gained fame for its outstanding agility and association with the "Red Baron," Manfred von Richthofen. It was powered by a 110 hp Oberursel UR.II rotary engine. The Fokker E.III, an early monoplane, incorporated the innovative synchronization gear that allowed its Spandau machine gun to fire through the propeller arc, a revolutionary development in aerial combat. The Fokker E.V/D.VIII, nicknamed the "Flying Razor," was another monoplane design, notable for its cantilever wing construction. Other fighters, such as the Hannover CL.II, LFG Roland D.II and D.VI, Pfalz D.III, and Pfalz D.XII, contributed to the diversity of German air power, with the Pfalz D.III being particularly recognized for its sturdy construction and maneuverability.

The most important ground attack aircraft included the Albatros J.I, which had an armored cockpit to protect the crew from ground fire, and the AEG J.I, which combined protection with a reliable Mercedes D.III engine. The Halberstadt CL.II and CL.IV, as well as the Hannover CL.III, were two-seat close-support aircraft, heavily armed with rear-facing Parabellum machine guns and forward-firing Spandau guns. These aircraft were specifically designed for low-altitude missions, supporting German infantry on the ground. For pilot training, the Etrich Taube, a single-engine monoplane with a unique bird-like wing design, provided stable handling characteristics ideal for beginner pilots. The Rumpler C.VIII, a reconnaissance biplane, was also adapted for training purposes, offering dual-control configurations for instructors and trainees.

Early bombers included the twin-engine AEG G.IV, which featured an all-metal frame and a bomb load of 400 kg, and the Albatros C.III, a versatile two-seat aircraft used for both reconnaissance and light bombing. The Albatros C.VII improved on its predecessor with a more powerful engine and better aerodynamics. Larger bombers, such as the Friedrichshafen G.III and the Gotha G.IV and G.V, were capable of strategic bombing missions, carrying payloads of up to 500 kg. The Gotha G.V, in particular, was used for night bombing raids over London. The Rumpler G.I, G.II, and G.III represented earlier efforts at heavy bomber development, with mixed success due to their limited payload and range compared to later designs.

=== Vehicles ===
The German army used a variety of vehicles, ranging from traditional horse-drawn carts to the first motorized vehicles and tanks. Horse-drawn wagons were the backbone of German logistics and were primarily used to transport ammunition, food and the wounded. They were robust and could also be used in difficult terrain, where motorized vehicles often failed. Trucks were used alongside horses. These trucks had payloads of around three to five tons and reached a top speed of 25 to 35 kilometers per hour. They were mainly used to supply troops at the front and to transport heavier goods. In 1914, there were two variants of military trucks. The first type was the 4-ton truck, the basic design of which had already been introduced a few years before the war; 650 of these vehicles were confiscated from civilian sources during mobilization. The second lighter truck that accompanied the cavalry divisions was the 3-ton cavalry truck.

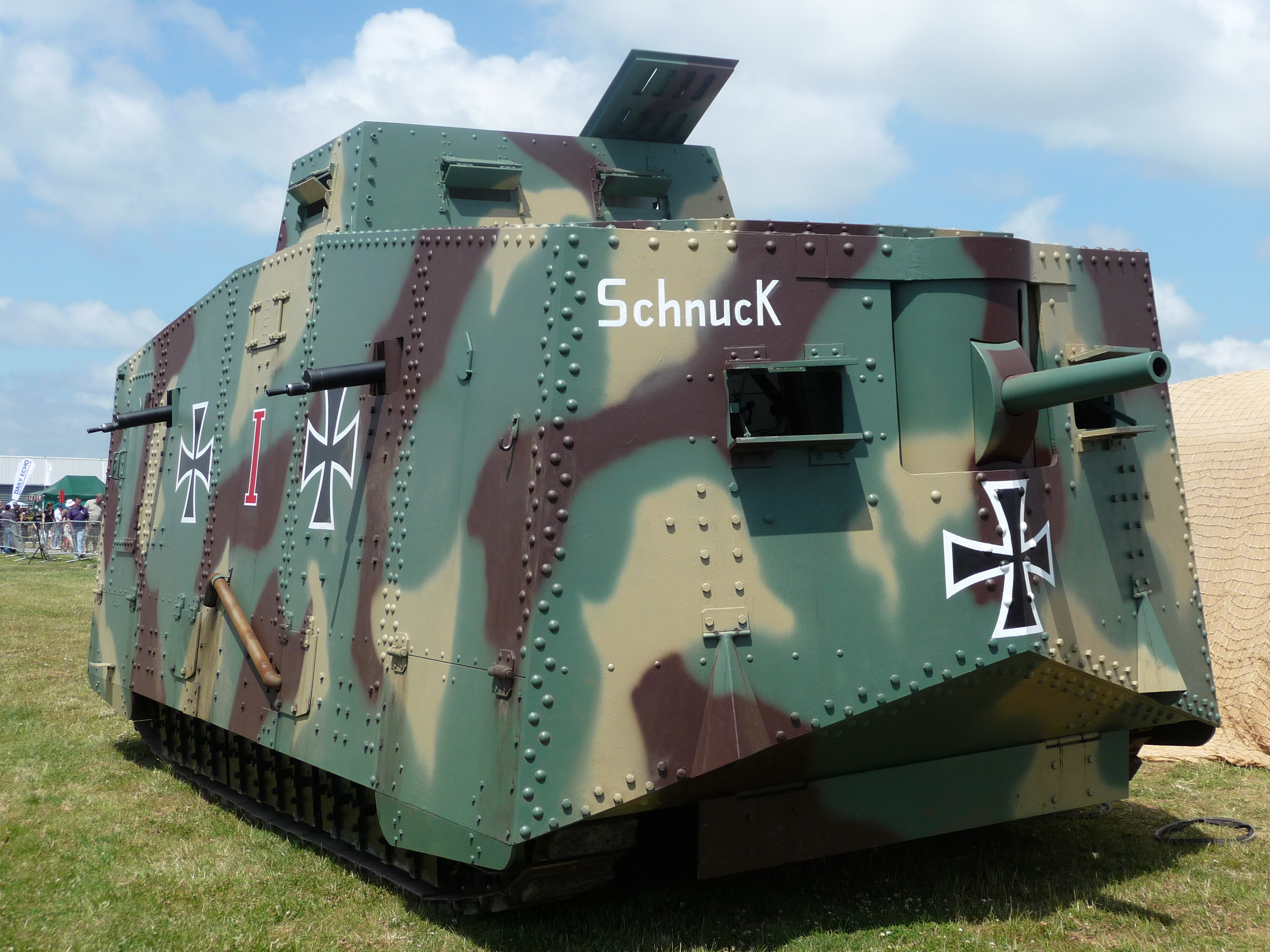
repilca of an A7V from 2009

As the war progressed, these basic types were supplemented by new types. For example, a passenger car was introduced in 1915 and a two-ton truck was put into service in the winter of 1916/17. In addition, some of the simple 2-, 3- and 4-ton trucks were converted for special tasks. Mobile X-ray machines were introduced in 1915, followed by disinfection vehicles and electrical workshops. In addition, a large number of anti-aircraft guns were mounted on 4-ton class chassis. Heavy and medium mobile telecommunications vehicles were also deployed on a large scale. In November 1918, the army had a total of 40,000 motor vehicles.

In the field of armoured vehicles, however, Germany was less advanced than the Allies. The A7V was the only tank produced by Germany and a late war product. The A7V weighed 30 tons, was armed with a 57 mm cannon and six machine guns, had up to 30 millimetres of armor and was powered by two Daimler engines with 100 hp each. However, with a top speed of 15 kilometers per hour, it was cumbersome and prone to mechanical problems Specialized vehicles rounded off the range. Artillery tractors such as the Daimler Artillery prime mover were developed to pull heavy guns, while motorized ambulances were used to evacuate the wounded.

== Bibliography ==
- Ball, Robert W. D. (1996). Mauser military rifles of the world. Lola: Krause Publications. ISBN 0-87341-395-4.
- Bull, Stephen (2016). German Machine Guns Of World War I MG 08 And MG 0815. Oxford: Osprey. ISBN 978-1-4728-1516-3.
- Bull, Stephen (2017). Canadian Corps Soldier versus Royal Bavarian Soldier. Oxford: Osprey. ISBN 978-1-4728-1976-5.
- Bull, Stephen (2000). World War One German Army. Brassey's History of Uniforms. London: Brassey's. ISBN 1-57488-2783.
- Drury, Ian (1995). German Stormtrooper 1914-18. London: Osprey. ISBN 1-85532-3729.
- Forczyk, Robert (2015). German Infantryman versus Russian Infantryman. Oxford: Osprey. ISBN 978-1-4728-0654-3.
- Christopher F. Foss, ed. (2003). The Encyclopedia of Tanks and armoured fighting Vehicles :The comprehensive Guide to over 900 armoured fighting Vehicles from 1915 to the present Day. Staplehurst: Spellmount. ISBN 978-1-8622-7188-3.
- Fosten, Donald (2003). The German Army 1914 - 18. Oxford: Osprey. ISBN 978-0-8504-5283-9.
- Freiherr von Gall, ed. (1913). Taschenkalender für das Heer begründet von W. Freiherr von Fircks: 1914 (in German). Berlin: A. Bath. OCLC 971434468.
- General Staff, ed. (1917). Handbook of the German Army in War. January 1917. London: Harrison and sons. OCLC 1052821656.
- General Staff, ed. (1920). Handbook of the German Army in War. London: H.M.S.O. OCLC 1052821656.
- Görlitz, Walter (1950). Der deutsche Generalstab Geschichte und Gestalt 1657–1945 (in German). Frankfurt am Main: Verlag der Frankfurter Hefte. OCLC 1244992235.
- Gray, Peter; Thetford, Owen (1962). German aircraft of the First World War. London: Putnam. OCLC 2310617.
- Groß, Gerhard P. (2022). Das Große Hauptquartier im Ersten Weltkrieg. Berlin: De Gryter Oldenbourg. ISBN 978-3-1107-8000-0.
- Hoffmann, W. (1920). Die deutschen Ärzte im Weltkriege: Ihre Leistungen und Erfahrungen. Berlin: Mittler & Sohn. OCLC 494729208.
- Hoffmann, W.; Schwiening, H. (1911). Hygiene der militärischen Unterkunfte, (Kasernen, Lazarette, militärische Bildungsanstalten usw.) Hygiene des Dienstes (Heeresergänzung, Dienstarbeit, Dienst der einzelnen Truppenarten usw.). Lehrbuch der Militarhygiene (in German). Vol. III. Berlin: August Hirschwald. OCLC 924471528.
- Hoffmann, W.; Schwiening, H.; Bischoff, H. (1910). Wärmeregulierung des Körpers (Luft, Kleidung, Klima), Ernährung. Lehrbuch der Militarhygiene (in German). Vol. I. Berlin: August Hirschwald. OCLC 924471637.
- Kilduff, Peter (1996). Germany's First Air Force 1941-1918. London: Arms & Armour. ISBN 978-1-8540-9352-3.
- Kitchen, Martin (1968). The German officer corps 1890-1914. Oxford: Clarendon Press. ISBN 0-19-821467-7.
- Morrow, John H.; et al. (Reconsidering a Century of Flight) (2003). Brave Men Flying. Chapel Hill, North Carolina: University of North Carolina Press. ISBN 978-1-4696-2558-4.
- Nash, David (1980). Imperial German Army handbook, 1914-1918. Shepperton: Ian Allan. ISBN 0-7110-0968-6.
- Ortenburg, Georg (2005). Waffen für Millionenheere. Augsburg: Bechtermünz. ISBN 3-8289-0521-8.
- Pawly, Ronald (2003). The Kaiser`s Warlords German Commanders of World War I. Oxford: Osprey. ISBN 1-78096-673-3.
- Showalter, Dennis (2016). Instrument of War: The German Army 1914-1918. Oxford: Osprey. ISBN 978-1-4728-1300-8.
- Stachelbeck, Christian (2017). Deutschlands Heer und Marine im Ersten Weltkrieg (in German). Berlin: De Gruyter. ISBN 978-3-4868-5472-5.
- Stephens, Frederick J.; Maddox, Graham J. (1975). The Organisation and Uniforms of the Imperial German Army 1900-1918. Almark. ISBN 0-85524-190-X.
- Stone, David (2015). The Kaiser's Army The German Army in World War One. London: Bloomsbury Publishing. ISBN 978-1-8448-6291-7.
- Sumner, Ian (2005). German Air Forces 1914–18. Oxford: Osprey. ISBN 1-84176-924-X.
- Thomas, Nigel (2012). The German Army in World War I (2) 1915-1917. Oxford: Osprey. ISBN 978-1-7809-6553-6.
- von Matuschka, Edgar Graf (1983). "Organisationsgeschichte des Heeres 1890 bis 1918". Von der Entlassung Bismarcks bis zum Ende des Ersten Weltkrieges 1890–1918. Deutsche Militärgeschichte 1648–1939 (in German). Vol. 3. Munich: Militärgeschichtliches Forschungsamt. ISBN 3-88199-112-3.
- War Department, ed. (1917). Notes on the German Army in the War: Translated at the Army war college, from a French official document of April, 1917. Washington: U.S. Government Printing Office. OCLC 9474643.
- Zaloga, Steven J. (2018). Superguns 1854–1991 Extreme Artillery From The Paris Gun And The V 3 To Iraq's Project Babylon. London: Osprey. ISBN 978-1-4728-2610-7.
