= Karl Viktor von Wilsdorf =

German general

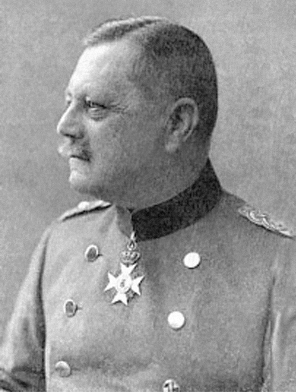
Karl Viktor von Wilsdorf

Karl Viktor von Wildsorf (18 January 1857, in Großhartmannsdorf, Kingdom of Saxony – 23 March 1920, in Dresden, Weimar Germany) was a German general of the infantry who served as the War Minister of the Kingdom of Saxony during World War I.

== Biography ==
Karl Viktor von Wildsorf was born in a small village in southern Saxony, near the Bohemian border. After passing the Abitur exam at König-Albert-Gymnasium in Freiberg, he enlisted in the Royal Saxon Army in 1875 as a one-year volunteer. After about 14 years service in his original regiment, the "Prinz Georg" Fusilier Regiment Nr. 108, Wilsdorf was promoted to lead a company in the Royal Saxon Army's 2nd Jäger Battalion, and his military career was underway. Following stints as a battalion commander, Wilsdorf was transferred to Dresden to replace Otto von Tettenborn as Commandant of the Saxon Cadet Corps. He then moved up to the Saxon War Ministry to serve as head of the Department for Personnel Affairs for then next seven years, going on active reserve status about one year prior to the outbreak of the Great War.

When the War began, von Wilsdorf was reactivated to function as the Chief of Staff for General Georg von Schweinitz, who had been appointed acting commanding general of the XIX. Army Corps in Leipzig. One month later, he found himself back in Dresden serving as War Minister Adolph von Carlowitz's provisional replacement. When it became clear after about one year that von Carlowitz would be remaining on the Front, General von Wilsdorf was permanently installed as Saxon War Minister in October 1915 by Friedrich August III and remained at this post for the remainder of the conflict. He went into retirement following the Armistice of November 1918 and died in Dresden in 1920.

== Military ranks ==
Promotions
Rank	Date
Second lieutenant	23 February 1877
Lieutenant	18 December 1883
Captain	13 December 1889
Major	26 March 1899
Lieutenant Colonel	21 March 1904
Colonel	23 November 1906
Major general	11 September 1910
Lieutenant general	10 September 1914
General of the infantry	11 February 1918
