= Esther von Kirchbach =

German journalist and chaplain (1894–1946)

- Born: Esther von Carlowitz; 26 May 1894
- Died: 19 February 1946 (aged 51)
- Occupations: Journalist, poet and chaplain

Esther von Kirchbach (née von Carlowitz; 26 May 1894 – 19 February 1946) was a German journalist, poet, and chaplain of the Confessing Church.

== Personal life ==
Esther was the eldest daughter of four children of Adolph von Carlowitz, Saxonian officer and later War Minister. At the beginning of the First World War, shortly before she graduated, she married Graf Georg zu Münster ('Count George of Munster'), who died of war injuries two years later. As a young widow with a child, she home-studied mathematics, German, philosophy and history in Marburg and Leipzig.

In 1921 she married theologian Arndt von Kirchbach, a priest with two children from a previous marriage. Together the couple had six children. As head of Protestant youth work, as Hofprediger of the Sophienkirche and as Superintendent of Freiburg, von Kirchbach was heavily involved in the Church. Together, the von Kirchbachs wrote articles, essays and letters and gave lectures addressing the status of women in various circles.

She died at the age of 51 from complications during surgery for an embolism.

== Career ==
In 1927 Esther von Kirchbach led the Bundes für eine lebendige Volkskirche ('Society for a Living People's Church') in Dresden. Starting from the Nazi takeover in 1933, she fought against the Nazi policy of Gleichschaltungspolitik der Kirchen (roughly, 'Political Synchronisation of Churches'). Her husband was also one of the leading representatives of the Inclusive Church in Dresden. Together, they continued their literary work and lecturing, despite repeated arrests and Adolph von Carlowitz's dismissal.

In 1934 Esther was the German delegate to the International Women's Congress in Budapest. In 1945, she was the only woman on the advisory board of the regional office engaged with refugees and war victims. She took refugees into her own parsonage in Freiberg.

== Legacy ==
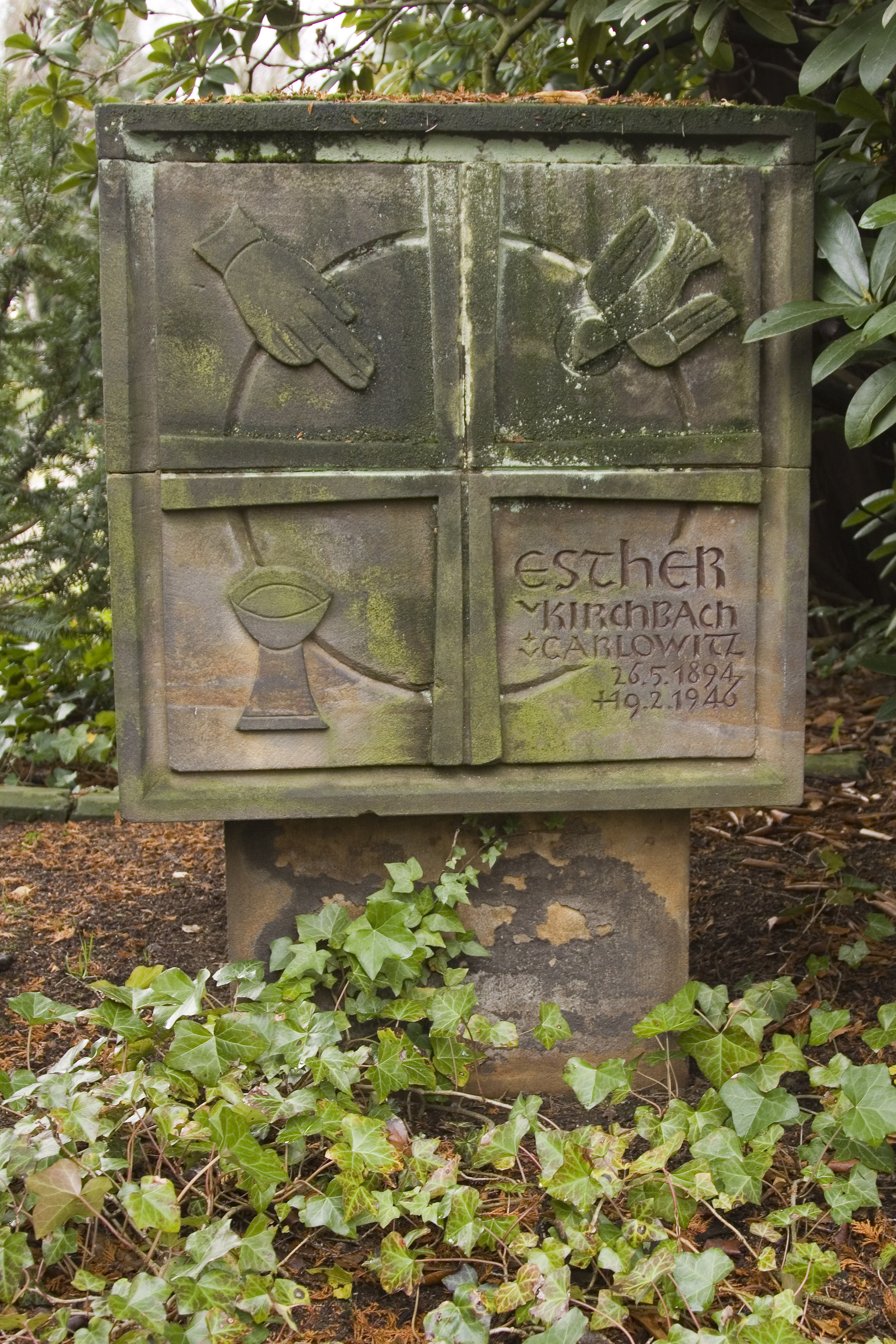
Von Kirchbach's grave

In Freiberg, a refuge and an association for the promotion of women's work were established in 1991. This committed non-profit organisation continues the work Esther von Kirchbach began.

Her life was commemorated on a German stamp.

== Literary works ==
- Die Hausgemeinde
- Gebot und Gebet: Katechismus im Alltag
- Unser Gästebuch 1945 : Aufzeichn., Begegnungen u. Brief
- Rund um einen Tisch, Berlin 1938.
- Von Sonntag und Alltag, Hamburg 1939.
- Johanna Spyri, die Jugenderzählerin aus den Bergen, Stuttgart 1940.

== Sources ==
- Arndt von Kirchbach: Lebenserinnerungen RGG III S1296
- This page was abridged and translated from the German Wikipedia on 23 March 2009.
