= Adibo =

Community in the Northern region of Ghana

Coordinates: 9°18′N 0°01′E

Adibo is a community in the Northern region of Ghana located 16.05 km from Yendi. It is famous for its location for the Battle of Adibo in 1896 between the German colonial invaders and the Dagbamba people.

== Location ==
Adibo is situated along the N2 highway between Bimbilla and Yendi, and surrounded by nearby communities including Nakpachei in the south, Choo in the north and Yimahigu in the North-West.
