= Battle of Adibo =

Battle involving the German Empire

Date	December 3rd and 4th, 1896
Location	Adibo, near Yendi 9.3024°N 0.0198°E
Result	German victory

Belligerents
Kingdom of Dagbon	German Empire

Commanders and leaders
Yaa-Naa Kambon Nakpem Ziblim; Achiri Damba; Namonaa Mahamma Yalizolana Aliru	Lieutenant Valentin Von Massow; Hans Gruner; Lieutenant Gaston Thierry Feldwebel Heitmann

Strength
4,000–7,000 men	372 men, including 4 Europeans, 91 soldiers and 46 carriers; armed with breech-loaders

The Battle of Adibo was a German military campaign in 1896 against the Dagbamba of West Africa in Adibo, now in present-day Ghana. Following their resistance against foreign authority, the Dagbamba tribesmen met and launched an attack on the heavily armed German Schutztruppe and Askari paramilitary police accompanying the Lieutenant Valentin von Massow on his way to their capital at the village of Adibo, who had been sent by the German colonial administration to quell the rebellion. The Dagbamba fighters suffered significant losses on the second day of the battle and yielded after their capital Yendi was razed to the ground on December 4, 1896. Defeat of the Dagbamba enabled the German Empire to complete establishing the Togoland protectorate, which encompassed the eastern part of the Kingdom of Dagbon. The western part of the Kingdom was released to the British and incorporated into the British Empire.

Written accounts of the incursion primarily come from the personal letters and diaries of von Massow to his mother, as well as his official reports addressed to the Governor of Lome under the colonial department of the Ministry of Foreign Affairs in Berlin. Dagbaŋ drummer storytellers maintain a different oral account of the event.

== Background ==
Before 1850, German missionaries had become well-established among the southern tribes of present-day Ghana and Togo, but Germany first established a formal protectorate along the coast of West Africa on July 5, 1884. They continued their advance northwards and from 1884 established the Togoland protectorate as a discontinuous part of the Deutsch-Westafrika protectorate that included Cameroon.

Their advance was influenced by the need to expand agricultural plantations, road and railway lines; and to exact forced labour for those purposes. Factors that facilitated their movement into the hinterlands included the construction of a port at Lomé, installation of the Kamina Funkstation radio communications transmitter, and the minimal resistance posed by the tribes they encountered such as the Ewe people, who mostly settled as fragmented clans.

By 1890, the German expeditions had ventured into the savanna regions of present-day Ghana and Togo, where they encountered the more formidable Dagbamba warriors.
