= One-year volunteer =

19th century European military service type

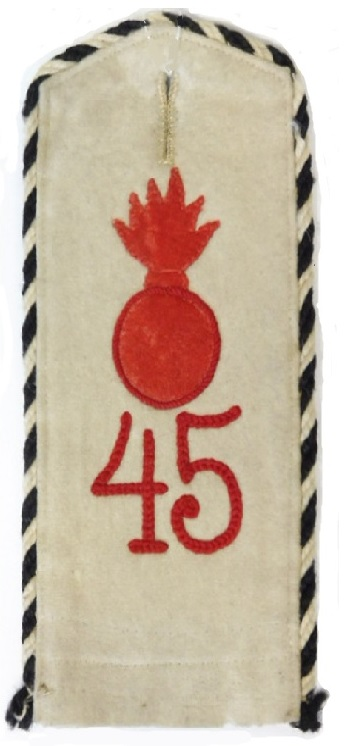
Einjährig-Freiwilliger shoulder board insignia of the Imperial German Army, here in the 45th Field Artillery Regiment, 1899–1915

A one-year volunteer, short EF (German: Einjährig-Freiwilliger), was, in a number of national armed forces, a conscript who agreed to pay his own costs for the procurement of equipment, food and clothing, in return for spending a shorter-than-usual term on active military service and the opportunity to become a reserve officer.

The one-year volunteer service (Einjährig-Freiwilligen-Dienst) was first introduced in 1814 in Prussia, and was inherited by the German Empire from 1871 until 1918. It was also used by the Austro-Hungarian Army, from 1868 until 1918, and the Austro-Hungarian Navy. One-year volunteers also existed in the national armies of Bavaria, France and Russia.

== Prussia ==
In the Prussian Army, the one-year volunteer service was created during the Napoleonic Wars in 1814. It was open for enlistees up to the age of 25. These enlisted soldiers were usually high school graduates (i.e. those who had passed the 9th Grade Matura or 13th Grade Abitur examinations), who would opt to serve a one-year term rather than the regular two or three-year conscription term, and who would be allowed a free choice of service branch and unit, but who were obliged to equip and support themselves at their own expense throughout. In today's monetary value this cost might equate to at least €10,000, which restricted the option to members of the affluent social classes, considered to be "officer material", who hoped to pursue a reserve officer career path. The aim of restricting the pool of reserve officers in this way was explicitly expressed by Emperor Wilhelm II. Eligibility for the one-year route of military service was a privilege conferred after examination of the enlistee's suitability and academic qualifications.

On completing their primary recruit training, those aspiring to become Reserve Officers would have to qualify and demonstrate suitability for promotion to the Gefreiter ('lance corporal') rank, and would then continue to receive further specialized instruction until the end of their one-year term, usually attaining and leaving as überzählige Unteroffiziere ('supernumerary corporals') with the opportunity to advance further as reservists. Enlistees who did not aspire to officer grade would leave at the end of their one-year term as Gemeine ('ordinary soldier') enlisted rank (for example Musketier or Infanterist) and a six-year reserve duty obligation.

== Bavaria ==
In 1868 the Bavarian Army, reforming after the loss against Prussia in the Austro-Prussian War, created one-year volunteers as well. Like the Prussians the status was marked by twisted wool piping in the national colours (blue and white); here attached to the shoulder pads that would soon be exchanged for shoulder boards.

== German Empire ==
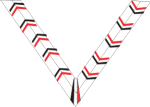
Einjährig-Freiwilliger chevron of the Imperial German Navy

The Prussian concept of one-year volunteers was spread across the new German Empire where volunteers could fulfill their service in only a year and often choose their own unit. However they were required to pay for their own equipment and upkeep. This was open to men between the ages of 17 and 23 (Note: Section 14 of the Reich Military Law.) who had an academic qualification such as a high school diploma or had passed the one-year examination. (Note: The one-year examination covered German, two foreign languages, geography, history, literature, mathematics, physics and chemistry.)

Enlistment took place on the first day of October of each year, exceptionally also on the first day of April. After six months of active service, they could be promoted to private first class. The expectation was that they would then train as reserve or Landwehr officers or non-commissioned officers. They were referred to as "officer candidates" after they had passed a theoretical and practical examination during their year of service. At the outbreak of the First World War they were required over the two years after service to complete two training courses of eight weeks each, after which they were recommended by the corps commander for appointment as a reserve officer and could be commissioned following a vote by the district's reserve officer corps.

The one-year volunteer status was denoted by twisted wool piping in the respective state colours around the shoulder boards; with cavalry units alternatively having the piping around their shoulder knots, the upper part of epaulettes or the strap of shoulder scales. In the navy their status shown by a down-turned double chevron in the national colours black, silver (instead of white) and red on the left shoulder sleeve.

== Austria ==
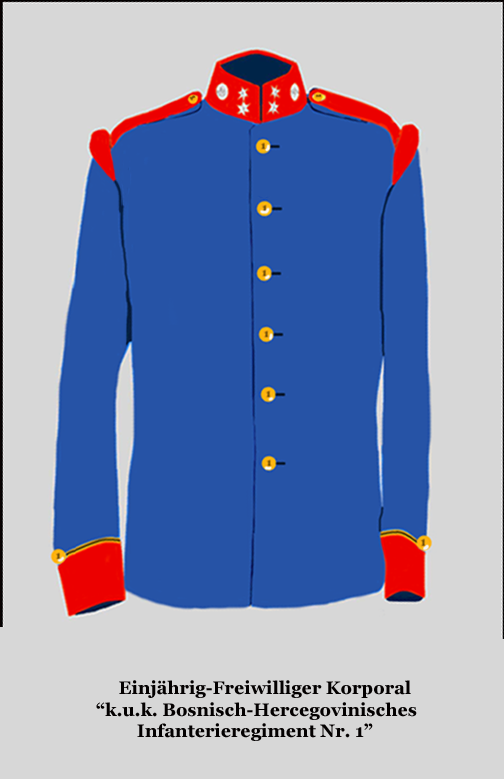
Tunic of a one-year volunteer corporal in the 1st Bosnian-Herzegovinian Infantry Regiment of the Austro-Hungarian Army

The Austrian Bundesheer still recruits their reserve officers from one-year volunteers. It also uses this means to assess the suitability of aspirant officers to begin specialized studies in "military command and control" (C2) at the Theresian Military Academy in the Wiener Neustadt.

== Sources ==
- Fircks, Karl Ernst Wilhelm von [in German] (1914). Taschenkalender für das Heer 1914 (in German). Berlin: Verlag von A. Bath.
