= Ministry of War of Saxony =

The Ministry of War of Saxony was a government ministry of the Kingdom of Saxony that existed from 1831 to 1919. It subsequently briefly existed as the Ministry of Defence in the Free State of Saxony from 1918 until 1919, when the new Weimar Constitution of Germany provided for the replacement of all state ministries of defence by the Federal Ministry of Defence.

== History ==
The 1831 Constitution of Saxony established 6 ministries, which each reported to the Diet (parliament). The War Office was one of these ministries.

In 1866, following the North German Confederation Treaty, the Kingdom of Saxony entered the North German Confederation. In 1870, the November Treaties were signed to admit several southern states into the new German Confederation. Representatives from Saxony were included, and the result of the treaties included provisions permitting Saxony to retain its own ministry of war.

Following World War I, the German Empire collapsed in the German Revolution of 1918–1919. During the revolution in Saxony, Minister of War Gustav Neuring was killed by wounded and disabled war veterans who had heard a rumor that their benefits would be cut.

After the revolution, the new Weimar Republic underwent significant centralisation, which resulted in the abolition of the war ministries of individual states and their replacement with a single federal ministry of defence.

== Ministers of War (1831-1918) and Ministers of Defence (1918-1919) ==
- 1831–1839 Johann Adolf von Zezschwitz
- 1843–1846 Gustav von Nostitz-Wallwitz
- 1847–1848 Karl Friedrich Gustav von Oppel
- 1848–1849 Albrecht Ernst Stellanus von Holtzendorff
- 1849 Karl Friedrich August von Buttlar
- 1849–1866 Bernhard von Rabenhorst
- 1866–1891 Alfred von Fabrice
- 1891–1902 Paul von der Planitz
- 1902–1914 Max Klemens Lothar von Hausen
- 1914–1916 Adolph von Carlowitz
- 1916–1918 Karl Viktor von Wilsdorf
- 1918–1919 Hermann Fleissner (USPD)
- 1919 Gustav Neuring (SPD)
- 1919 Bruno Kirchhof (SPD)
