= Naa Gbewaa Shrine =

Ancestral shrine in Ghana

- Interactive map of the Naa Gbewaa Shrine area

General information
- Architectural style: Traditional Northern Ghanaian
- Location: Pusiga, Upper East Region, Ghana
- Coordinates: 11.0070°N 0.2850°W

Height
- Height: Approx. 8 m

Technical details
- Floor count: Single level
- Grounds: Not publicly documented

Naa Gbewaa Shrine is a sacred ancestral shrine located in Pusiga, Upper East Region, Ghana. It is dedicated to Naa Gbewaa, the founder of the Mamprusi, Dagomba, Nanumba, and related northern Ghanaian kingdoms.

== History ==
According to oral tradition, the shrine was established in the 14th century by Naa Gbewaa, whose descendants founded several northern Ghanaian kingdoms. The site has served for centuries as a locus of ancestral veneration, rituals, and communal gatherings. Oral histories emphasize the shrine as the resting place of Naa Gbewaa's spirit, making it central to the spiritual life of the Mamprusi and related peoples.

== Custodianship ==
The shrine is traditionally managed by a Tindana, a spiritual custodian responsible for rituals, offerings, and maintaining cultural integrity. Access is regulated, and ceremonies are conducted according to established customs.

== See also ==
- Naa Gbewaa
- Mamprusi people
- Dagbon
