= Nanung =

Ancient traditional states in Ghana

Nanung Nanumba Nanumba Nanuŋ
- Capital and largest city: Bimbilla; 8°51′26″N 0°03′24″W
- Official languages: Nanungli/Dagbanli (lingua franca), English, French, Arabic
- Ethnic groups: Nanumba
- Religion: African traditional religions, Islam, Christianity
- Demonym: Nanumba
- Government: Traditional State
  - Bimbilla Naa: Nyelinbolgu Naa, Regent (Dagbani: Gbaŋlana)

History
  - Founded: c. 1200s–1300s

Area
  - Total: 6,448 km^{2} (2,490 sq mi)

Population
  - Estimate: 421,150
- Time zone: UTC+0 (GMT+0)
  - Summer (DST): UTC+0 (GMT+0)
- Today part of: Ghana

Nanung (Dagbani: Nanuŋ, Nanun or Nanumba) is one of the earliest known ancient states in Northern Ghana and currently one of several traditional areas in the region, with Bimbilla as its capital. The Bimbilla Naa is the Overlord or Ruler and president of the Nanumba Traditional Area.Nanung is located in the Eastern Corridor of Ghana, mainly in the Northern Region and parts of the Oti Region.

== History ==
According to oral history, Nanung was founded by Naa Gmantambu (Dagbani: Naa Ŋmantambo), a son of Naa Gbewaa, in the 13th century after migrating south from his brother Naa Sitobu, who founded the present-day Dagbon Kingdom. The same oral history claimed that the new state was subsequently called Nanung, which came from the Dagbani words "Naa" (King or Chief) and "Nua" (Hand). Naa Sitobu is said to have pointed his hand south, and Naa Gmantambu and his followers went in the direction indicated by the hand. So "Naa Nua" (The King's hand) became Nanung.

== Royal houses ==
The 'Skin' (Dagbani: Gbandi or Gbaŋ) is the symbol of authority in Nanung (also called Naam), just as it is in most traditional states in Northern Ghana. Nanuŋ has two royal families that ascend to the Bimbilla Naam in an alternating arrangement. These royal families include Gbuhmayili (Dagbani: Gbuɣma-Yili) and Bangyili (Dagbani: Baŋ-Yili).The princes and princesses from these two royal families are also primarily appointed as chiefs and queens in most towns and villages of Nanung.

== Geography ==
Nanung stretches along the Eastern Corridor, covering districts including Nanumba North Municipality, Nanumba South, and major parts of Nkwanta North. Major towns in Nanung include Lepusi (Dagbani: Lepuɣi), Bincheratanga, Bakpaba, Dimong, Pusiga, Bimbilla, Nakpayili, Wulensi (Dagbani: Wuleɣi), Lungni, Chichahi, Chamba, Taali, Dokpam, Opijua, Nakpayili, Puduya, Binda, Kpassa, Oti-Damanko and Sibi. Nanung borders Togo to the east, Salaga to the west, Dagbon to the north and Dambai and Nkwanta to the south.

== Demography, ethnicity and chieftaincy ==
Nanung is multi-ethnic, with Nanumbas, considered direct siblings to both Dagombas and Mamprusi as the main ruling tribe. Nanumbas are also direct cousin to Mossi people (Dagbani: Moɣi) of the Mossi Kingdoms of Burkina Faso. Konkombas are the other major tribe. Other tribes include Chambas, Chokosi, Tem (also known as the Temba or Kotokoli), Ewes, Bassaris, Nawuris, and a host of other indigenous tribes.

== Nanung past rulers ==
While there is documented evidence of the rulers in the colonial and post-colonial eras, evidence of the rulers in the pre-colonial era relies on oral tradition and history passed down through music, drumming, and oral storytelling.

Position	Incumbent	Tenure (Month/Year)
Pre-colonial Rulers
1st (founder)	Naa Gmantambu	c. 1200s to 1300s
2nd	Naa Sulmwe	--/---- to --/----
3rd	Naa Kumkayuɣiri	--/---- to --/----
4th	Naa Gajiporiga	--/---- to --/----
5th	Naa Napaprigu	--/---- to --/----
6th	Naa Asa	--/---- to --/----
7th	Naa Nakoŋ	--/---- to --/----
8th	Naa Bingura	--/---- to --/----
9th	Naa Nyelinbolgu	--/---- to --/----
10th	Naa Mahmuru	--/---- to --/----
11th	Naa Damba	--/---- to --/----
12th	Naa Sulgu	--/---- to --/----
13th	Naa Gbuɣma	--/---- to --/----
14th	Naa Nmoro	--/---- to --/----
15th	Naa Kurigu	--/---- to --/----
16th	Naa Bang (Naa Baŋ)	--/---- to --/----
17th	Naa Shero	--/---- to --/----
18th	Naa Naatoham Kpema	--/---- to --/----
19th	Naa Mahamaŋ Kalo	--/---- to --/----
20th	Naa Dahamani	--/---- to --/----
21st	Naa Yakubu (Saviɣu Suŋ)	--/---- to --/----
Rulers under German colonial rule
22nd	Naa Abalsi	1881 to 1896
23rd	Naa Salifu Kurili (1st reign)	1896 to 1909
24th	Naa Aduna ŋunbaŋkum	1909 to 1917
Rulers under British protectorate
25th	Naa Salifu Kurili (2st reign)	1917 to 1929
26th	Naa Ziblim Kuntimsa	1930 to 1945
27th	Naa Ablai (Kurugu-Kpaa)	1945 to 1957
28th	Naa Naatoham Bla	1944 to 1957
Overlords during independent Ghana
29th	Naa Dasana (Gbuŋgbuŋ)	1959 to 1981
30th	Naa Abarika Atta (Gbani)	1982 to 09/1999
31st	Naa Andani Dasana	04/2003 to 06/2014

The succession line in Nanung follows a patrilineal system. Consequently, all future overlords are considered direct patrilineal descendants of Naa Gmantambu and, by extension, Naa Gbewaa.

== Struggle against colonialism ==
In late 1896, Nanung was invaded by the German colonial army. Naa Abalsi was the reigning Overloard. Under the command of Lieutenant Valentin von Massow, the German army reached Bimbilla on November 29, 1896, effectively completing the occupation of Nanung. The fall of Bimbilla was generally seen as a precursor to the Battle of Adibo against the Dagbon Kingdom.

== Festivals ==
The main festivals in Nanung includes Damba festival, Fire festival (Dagbani: Buɣum Chuɣu), Eid al-Fitr (Dagbani: Konyuri Chuɣu), Eid al-Adha (Dagbani: Chimsi Chuɣu), and Guineafowl festival (Dagbani: Kpini Chuɣu).

== Economy ==
Yam farming is the primary occupation of the people in Nanung. In addition to yams, maize, rice, and soybeans are also cultivated in the region.

== Transportation ==
The Oti and Daka rivers, international water bodies in West Africa, flow through parts of Nanung. The rivers' presence supports ferrying, linking villages within Nanung and to other parts of Northern and Central Ghana.

The Eastern Corridor Road, officially the National Highway 2 (N2), is a major national highway stretching from Accra to Northern Ghana. The road links Nanung to Nkwanta and Hohoe in the South, and Yendi and Tamale in the North. In Nanung, the road passes through the centre of major towns including Sibi, Kpassa, Oti-Damanko, Opijua, Bimbilla, Bincheratanga, Bakpaba, and Lepusi.

== Education ==
Bimbico, located in Bimbilla, is the only public tertiary institution in Nanung. It was established in 1962 by the Evangelical Presbyterian Church. It's now called E. P. College of Education, Bimbilla and is a degree-awarding institution.

== Notable people ==
- Mohamed Ibn Chambas, politician and international diplomat, 1st President of ECOWAS and former MP for Bimbilla
- Nantogma Atta, MP and deputy minister under Ghana's first president, Kwame Nkrumah
- Dominic Nitiwul, Bimbilla MP and former defence minister of Ghana
- Anas Aremeyaw Anas, renowned investigative journalist
- Mugeez (fullname: Rashid Abdul Mugeez), award-winning singer and songwriter
- Sheikh T. B. Damba, politician and diplomat, former Ghana ambassador to Saudi Arabia
- Stanley Yaw Nandaya, politician and MP for Wulensi
- Amosa Gbadamosi, former professional footballer and Ghana International
- Saani Iddi, former MP for Wulensi and deputy minister
- Salifu Saeed, former Northern regional minister
