= Damba (disambiguation) =

Damba (Paretroplus damii) is a species of cichlid.

Damba may also refer to:

== People ==
- Abukari Damba (born 1968), Ghanaian football goalkeeper
- Damba Zhalsarayev (born 1925), USSR citizen who wrote the Buryat lyrics for the anthem of the Republic of Buryatia
- Dashiin Damba (1908 – c. 1989), Mongolian politician
- Fanta Damba (born 1938), Malian jalimuso (Bambara female Griot-singer)
- Mah Damba (born Mah Sissoko, 1965), Malian traditional griot singer.

== Other uses ==
- Damba (municipality), Uíge Province, Angola
  - Damba Airport, Damba, Angola
- Damba festival, celebrated in Nalerigu Tamale and Wa in the Northern and Upper West Regions of Ghana
  - World Damba Festival, enactments of the Damba festival by Ghanaians living in other parts of the world.
- Damba Island, Lake Victoria, Uganda
- Damba mipentina (Paretroplus maculatus), an endangered species of cichlid native to Madagascar
