= Mole-Dagbon people =

Ethnic group in West Africa

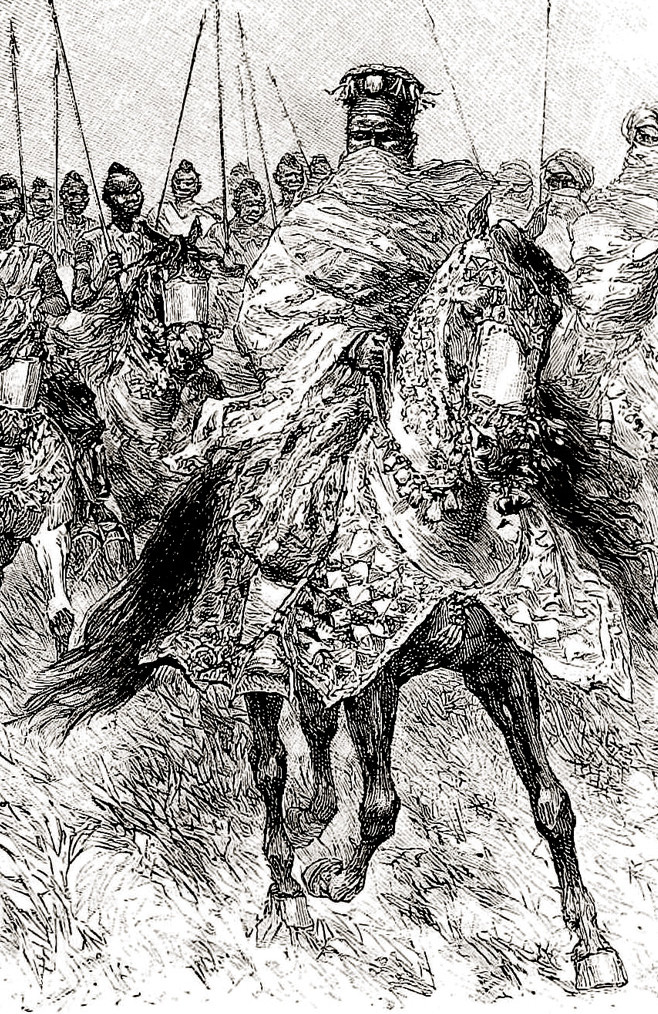
A depiction of a Mossi man on a horse

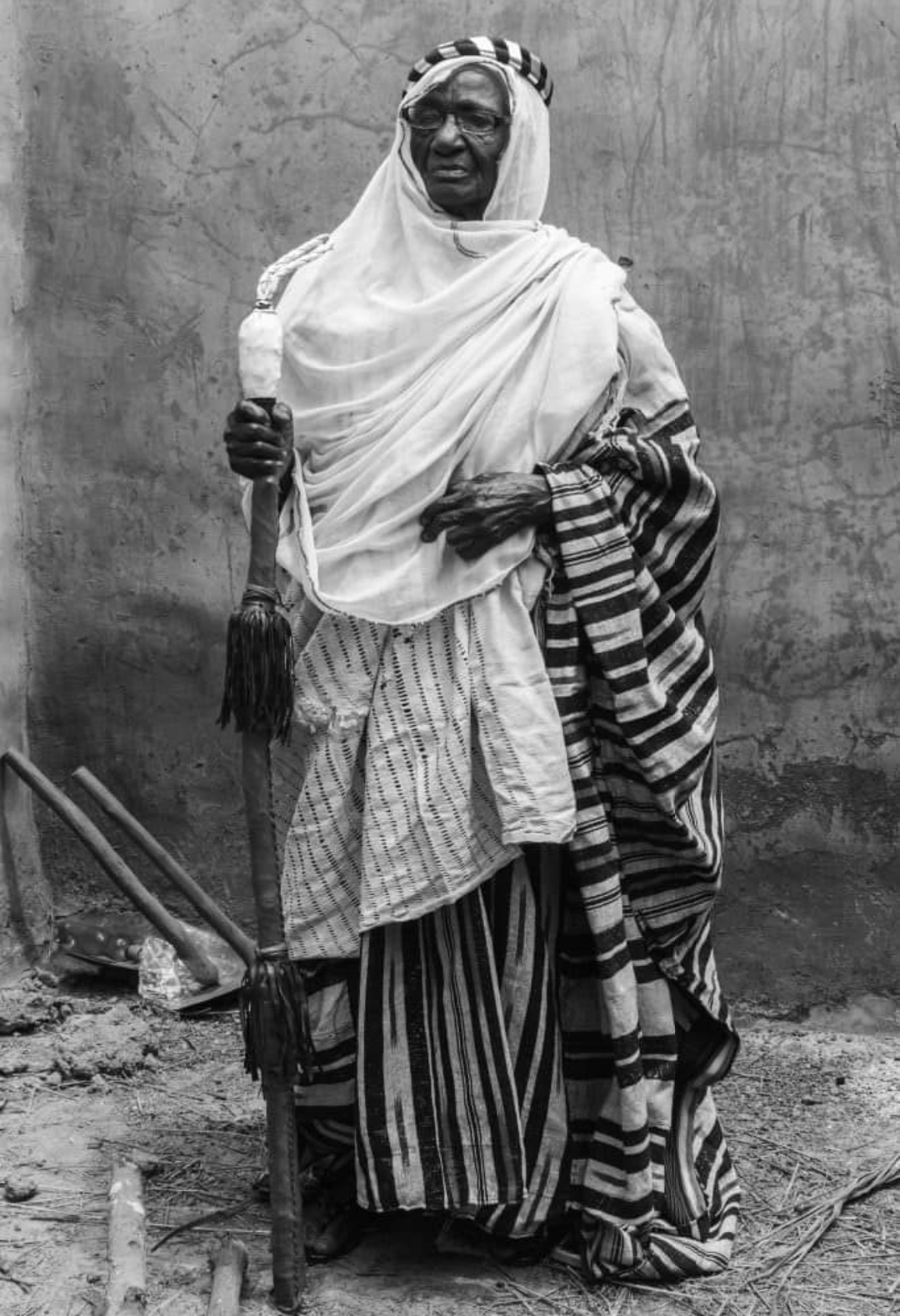
A female royalty of Dagbon.

The Mole-Dagbon, also called Mabia, or Mossi-Dagbon are a meta-ethnicity and western Oti–Volta ethno-linguistic group residing in six present-day West Africa countries namely: Benin, Burkina Faso, Ghana, Ivory Coast, Mali and Togo. They number more than 45 million. The Mole/Mossi/Moore people are located primarily in Burkina Faso while over lord Dagbon is in Ghana. Previously, the term Gur was used, Mabia has been used to refer to the linguistic supercluster.

== Ethnic constitution ==
The Mabia ethnic group include the following peoples:

- Dagomba
- Mossi
- Kusasi
- Mamprusi
- Nabit
- Talni
- Kamara
- Kantosi
- Hanga
- Gurene
- Nanumba
- Builsa
- Dagaaba
- Wala

== Notable Mabia people ==
Historical Leaders

- Naa Gbewaa
- Princess Yennenga
- Naba Ouedraogo

Footballers

- Mohammed Kudus
- Assan Ouedraogo
- Jonathan Pitroipa
- Edmond Tapsoba

=== Personalities ===
- Alban Bagbin: Ghana Politician and Speaker of Ghana parliament
- Yusuf Soalih Ajura
- Susanna Al-Hassan
- Habib Iddrisu
- Ibrahim Bancé
- Mahamudu Bawumia
- Blaise Compaoré
- Inusah Fuseini
- Fancy Gadam
- Sherifa Gunu
- Haruna Iddrisu
- Maccasio
- Aliu Mahama
- Ibrahim Mahama (artist)
- Hamza Mohammed
- Thomas Sankara
- Maurice Yaméogo
- Cardinal Philippe Ouedraogo
- Idrissa Nassa
- Issaka Sawadogo
- Mahamadou Bonkoungou
- Awini Emmanuel Ayonde
