= Kingdom of Dagbon =

Traditional kingdom in Ghana

Empire of Dagbon Kingdom of Dagbon Royaume de Dagbon Dagbaŋ
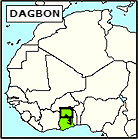
- Region of the Kingdom of Dagbon (black rectangle)
- Capital: Yendi; 09°26.5′N 00°0.5′W
- Largest city: Tamale
- Official languages: Dagbani (lingua franca), English, French, Arabic
- Ethnic groups: Dagbamba (Dagomba)
- Religion: Traditional, Sunni Islam
- Demonym: Dagbamba
- Government: Monarchy
  - King (Yaa-Naa) of Dagbon: Gariba II

History
  - Founded: c. 1200s–1300s

Area
  - Total: 97,702 km^{2} (37,723 sq mi)

Population
  - 2019 estimate: 5,197,937
- HDI (2021): 0.63 medium
- Time zone: UTC+0 (GMT0)
  - Summer (DST): UTC+0 (GMT0)
- Today part of: Ghana

The Kingdom of Dagbon (Dagbani: Dagbaŋ) is the oldest and one of the most organised traditional kingdoms in Ghana founded by the Dagomba people (Dagbamba) in the 15th century. During its rise, it comprised, at various points, the Northern, Upper West, Upper East, Savannah Region and North East regions of present-day Ghana. It also covered portions of Burkina Faso, North East Ivory Coast and North West Togo. Since Ghana's independence in 1957, the Kingdom has assumed a traditional, customary role like Ghana's other kingdoms and ethnic states.

The kingdom was formed when Naa Gbewaa and his descendants unified the Dagomba and related peoples who were ruled by decentralised chieftains known as Tindaamba. The antecedents of the Dagomba prior to Gbewaa's consolidation remain largely elusive, paralleled by the ambiguous origins of the Gbewaa lineage. Presently, governance within Dagbon entails a coalescence of authority between the Tindaamba and chiefs.The history of Dagbon is complex and misconceptions often arise regarding the Dagomba's origins, erroneously positing external origins. While lineage of chiefs are external, historical evidence affirms the presence and integral role of both the Tindaamba and the general Dagomba populace within the fabric of Dagbon society, prior to Gbewaa.

During the kingdom's rise, it established Ghana's oldest learning institution, the University of Moliyili, as a centre for learning and craftmanship, pioneered a writing system, and established centres of healing for the sick, similar to modern hospitals.

Dagbon is one of the few kingdoms in Africa where certain chieftaincy titles are reserved for women. They rule and ascend to their position of chieftaincy with male subjects, and own legal royal lands. The contribution of its women is prominent as it has given birth to Ghana's first female minister, and Africa's first female cabinet minister. Historically, its noble daughter, Yennenga known in Dagbani as Yɛmtɔri is regarded as the "mother" of the Mossi kingdoms due to marrying a man named Ouadrago, a people who constitute nearly half of the nation of Burkina Faso. The Gundo Naa is the head of all female chiefs, and Zosimli Naa forges cooperation, collaborations, and friendships.

On 18 January 2019 Yaa Naa Abubakari Mahama, was elected by Dagbon's kingmakers as king.

== History ==
=== Documentation ===
The Lunsi or Griots are the court historians of Dagbon and play the foremost role in preserving the kingdom's history. They constitute a guild of specialists charged with the duty of preserving historical and genealogical information, duly arranged in accordance with the succession of chiefs and noble lineages. Earlier history is known through the Lunsi and early Ajami writers. Later history is better known, because in addition to court historians, there are other sources of information, some of them independent of events in Dagbon itself. The Kingdom was founded by Naa Gbewaa, a great-grandson of a famous warrior named Tohaʒee. Tohazie fathered Kpuɣnambo (ʒinani) and these line of successors journeyed from east of Lake Chad, stopping at several places including Zamfara, present-day northern Nigeria, and in the Mali Empire.

=== Pre-Gbewaa period ===
Archaeological evidence suggest that there were thriving civilisation in Dagbon before the Neolithic period. There is evidence of agricultural activities and iron industries during the Neolithic period. The progenitors of modern Dagomba, the aboriginal Dagombas, are known locally as Dagbon Sablisi. During this period, Dagbon was a decentralised society. It was made of Tinsi( towns) which were headed by Tindaanima (singular: tindana). The Tindaamba mainly oversaw spiritual and religious activities. They undertook the pacification of the tingbana (earth gods), bina (gods), and buga (idols). Today, each town has a tindana who still oversee these religious activities. Festivals like the Bugum Chugu can be traced back to this era. Similarly, musical instruments like the Gungong and dances like the Zhem are all from this period.

Naa Gbewaa lineage traces back to Tohazhie, the Red (fair-skinned) Hunter. These histories narrate the story of Tohazhie, who left Tunga, east of Lake Chad, with a small band of cavalry men into Zamfara, present-day Nigeria, before moving on to Mali. Tohazhie married the daughter of the king of Mali, Pag Wabiga, and fathered a son, Kpoginumbo(Ʒinani).

After serving briefly in Mali, Kpogonumbo and his followers came into conflict with the rising Songhay Empire in western Africa, and reprisal attacks from the Songhay forced Kpogonumbo and his followers southward. Kpogonumbo then seized power and ruled over Biun in Gurma. His son, Naa Gbewaa (or Bawa), left Biun with some of his followers to settle at Pusiga in the northeastern corner of Ghana, where he ruled until he became blind. His grave is located at Pusiga in the Upper East Region. Naa Gbewaa's son, Zirili, succeeded him. Not much is known of Zirili. His younger brothers–Tohagu, Shitobu and Gmantambo–each of them travelled outward eventually expanding the borders of the Dagbon Kingdoms. Naa Gbewaa remains in the histories of the kingdoms of Dagbon and the kingdoms of the Mamprugu and Nanung, as their first king, founding their ruling dynasties through these sons.

=== Reign of Naa Gbewaa ===
Gbewaa established Dagbon in present-day northern Ghana, unifying small decentralised states headed by the Tindaamba. He was resident in Pusiga. Unlike his predecessors who were migratory, Gbewaa established a stable kingdom and a reign marked by stability and prosperity.

==== Lineage ====
Gbewaa fathered the following children

- Naa Ʒirli (Zirile), eldest son of Naa Gbewaa
- Fɔɣu, preferred successor of Naa Gbewaa
- Naa Shitɔbu, father of Yaa Naa Nyagse
- Mamprugulana Tohigu, founded Gmamprugu
- Bimbila-Naa Ŋmantambu, founded Nanung
- Salagalana Kayilkuna, ruled over Salaga
- Kuɣa-Naa Shibee Kpɛma
- Karaga-Naa Beemoni, ruled over Karaga
- Sunson-Naa Buɣyilgu, ruled over Sunsong
- Sanglana Shibee Bila, ruled over Sang, in Eastern Dagbon
- Nyensung Yaambana
- Savelugu-Naa Yenyoo, ruled over Savelugu
- Nanton-Naa Baatanga, ruled over Nanton
- Yamolkaragalana Kayetuli, ruled over Yemokaraga
- Bohinsan Zugulana
- Zantanlana Yirigitundi, ruled over Zantaani in Western Dagbon, now under Tolon District
- Zoggolana Sungburi, ruled over Zoggu
- Nyingaa Ʒibie
- Kpuɣli Kungoo
- Gundo-Naa Kachaɣu, eldest daughter, became the first Gundo Naa. The Gundo Naa title is reserved for only females.
- Yemtori (Yennenga), beloved daughter, travelled northward and married Rialle. Their son, Ouedraogo founded the Mossi Kingdoms.

After Gbewaa's death, his children led by his son Shitobu settled briefly at the town of Gambaga before moving south to Namburugu, near Karaga, where he resided. The king became known as Yaa Naa, meaning "king of strength/power". As Sitobu moved south, he unified indigenous Dagombas, Konkomba, Nafeba, Basare and Chamba, who did not have centralised political structures, except for the office of the tindana–the earth priest. The tindana presided over ritual ceremonies and acted as a mediator between the people and the gods of the land. Sitobu's son, Naa Nyaɣsi (r. 1416–1432) succeeded him and embarked on a war of expansion, overthrowing many of the Tindaamba and holding sway over the indigenous people. Naa Nyagsi established his capital at Yani Dabari, located in the area of Diyali, near Tamale, and developed a stable political organisation by installing his sons, brothers and uncles as rulers over the conquered people. The surviving tindaamba continued to function as earth priests.

=== European conquest ===
In the late 19th century, the Germans were expanding from the East, the British from the South, and the French from the North and East. The Germans invaded Dagbon in 1896. After the German invasion of Eastern Dagbon at the Battle of Adibo, Eastern Dagbon fell to the Germans. The centuries-old Gbewaa Palace was burnt. Eastern Dagbon became part of German Togoland and Western Dagbon became part of the British Gold Coast as a protectorate, not a colony. The British presence prevented further German attacks into Western Dagbon. Following World War I, eastern Dagbon became part of British Togoland. The Gold Coast achieved independence in 1957 and became Ghana. The result of British and German imperialism was the loss of its traditional artifacts, way of life and a divided Kingdom whose wounds would not completely heal till the second decade of the 21st century.

The division of Dagbon by the Germans and British without regard to the peoples history brought several challenges, mainly in its traditional leadership. The Kingdom since around the 1920s has been characterised by repeated succession disputes and conflict mainly from British and German Imperial interference in Dagbon's succession. Today, the king of Dagbon's court remains at the city of Yendi. The kingdom is divided into territorial chiefdoms, categorised from divisional to village chieftaincies. The monarch of Dagbon is known as the Yaa Naa.

=== Relocation of capital ===
The capital of Dagbon was relocated from Yani Dabari (Ruins of Yani), near Diare, to current Yani (Yendi) in the east because of the invasion of the Gonja people. Gonja attacks in Western Dagbon (Tomo), especially at Daboya dealt a lot of damage to the Dagomba people. Naa Luro, though victorious over the Gonja in a later battle, could not stand the sustained warfare and relocated the capital to Yendi. The Gonja followed eastward Naa Zanjina finally halted the Gonja attacks when he decisively defeated them and killed their chief, Kumpatia, at Sang near Yendi.

Naa Zanjina not only is reputed to be the first Muslim ruler of the Dagbon, but is also credited with encouraging trade. With the relocation of the capital to Yendi and the return of peace, a Muslim community emerged at the Yaa Naa's palace at Yendi. The Dyula, of Mande origin, led by Sabali-Yarna, and the Hausa Muslims, led by the Kamshe Naa, bolstered Islamic influence in the kingdom. Beginning with the Sabali-Yarna, and later the Kamshe Naa, these people became responsible for the Yaa Naa's protective prayers. At the Yaa Naa's palace, Muslim titles, a sign of the integration of Muslim elders into the political structure, included the Walgu Naa, who made sure that the Yaa Naa had his portion to "Drink the Qur'an"; the Nayil Liman, the imam of the Yaa Naa, and the Yidan Kambala, were also credited with the imamship.

The extension of trade with the Dyula, and later with the Hausa, linked the Dagbon state with neighbouring kingdoms, like the Fezzan, Egypt, and the Bight of Benin. By 1788, Yendi was said to be bigger than Kumasi and Salaga.

It was culturally closer to, and was the result of, other Sahelian kingdoms, especially to the Mossi Kingdoms, Mali Empire, Songhai Empire, and Hausa Bakwai, with which Dagbon were major trading partners for salt, kola nuts.

== Kingdoms and states that originated from Dagbon ==
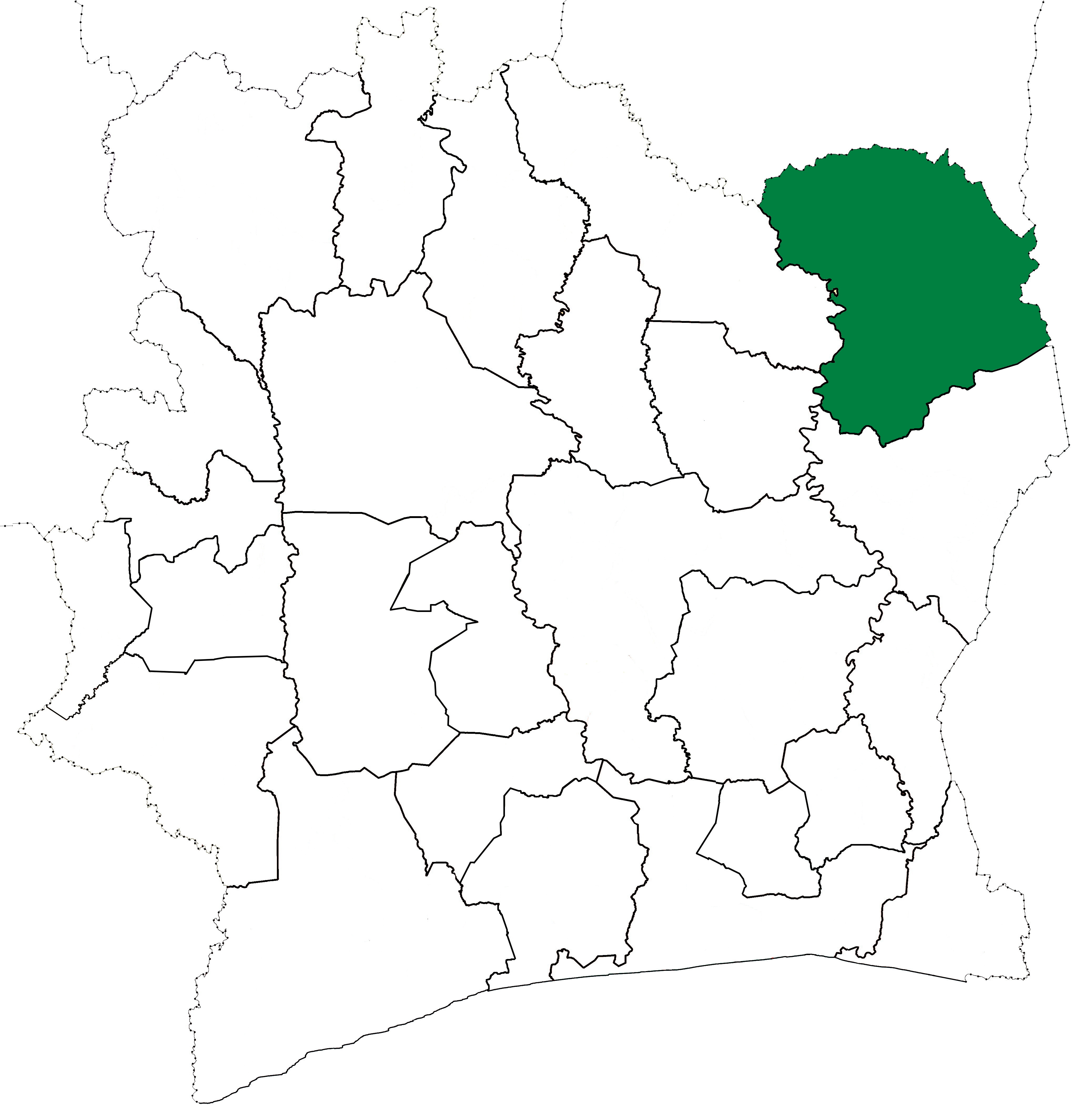
Bouna, Ivory Coast. It shares Boundaries with Ghana.

When Naa Gbewaa died, many subkingdoms arose including Mamprugu and Nanung. While Gbewaa was still alive, his daughter Yennenga, travelled north and founded the Mossi Kingdoms of Ouagadougou(Dagbani: Waɣaduɣu), Tenkodogo (Dagbani: Tingkurgu) Yatenga (Dagbani: Yatiŋa), and Fada N'Grumah, who constitute the majority of present-day Burkina Faso. Other kingdoms that emerged from Dagbon include the Bouna Kingdom of Ivory Coast, and the Dagaaba states of the Upper West Region of Ghana.

== Royal houses ==
There are two main houses among the royals of Dagbon. These are the House of Abudu and the House of Andani. The royals of Dagbon are skilled in statecraft, lobbying and royal politics. The current Yaa Naa is a member of the House of Andani and the leader of his military wing the Tolon Naa is from the Abudu House. Royals in Dagbon compete intensely for chieftaincy titles but work collaboratively after ascensions.

== Geography ==
Dagbon experiences a tropical savanna climate, characterized by distinct wet and dry seasons. The predominant vegetation type is Guinean forest–savanna mosaic, characterized by a band of interlaced forest, savanna, and grassland.

== Common festivals ==
1. Damba festival is the largest festival in Ghana, celebrated by the people of the Northern, Savanna, North East, Upper East and Upper West Regions of Ghana.
2. Bugum Chugu (fire Festival) is the first Dagomba festival in the year. It is celebrated in the first month of the Dagomba lunar year.

== Historical educational and knowledge systems ==
=== Writing system ===
Dagbon scholars used a modified Arabic script, the Dagbanli Script, in its communication. Dr. Phllis Ferguson describes it as lexically Arabic, but syntactically Dagbani. Much of this writing system has been lost due European colonisation. Archives and manuscripts that were housed in Moliyili were burned during the German invasion and looting of Dagbon. A significant amount of the archives was transported to Denmark in the twentieth century. Today, Dagbon uses an English derived writing system.

=== Scholarly families ===
There were several scholarly clans in ancient Dagbon, some of them are now lost to time. A prominent family was Moliyili, House of Moli/Mole. Moliyili had support and substantial material resources for their intellectual endeavours from Yaa Naa, the King of Dagbon. The Mole were granted a degree of administrative and legal independence and protection from external interference. They thrived due to robust economic and political backing, which enabled them to engage in continuous intellectual pursuits.

The diverse range of topics covered in their manuscripts, spanning chronicles, biographies, jurisprudence, pilgrimage guides, Arabic linguistics, and Qur'anic commentaries, mirrors their status as a semi-autonomous intellectual and spiritual elite. Notably, certain writings took on a scientific and technological character, such as works related to agriculture, medicine, pharmacology, and metallurgy. These writings not only underscore their independent economic standing but also illustrate that Mole learning was intricately linked to various societal activities, organizations, and institutions.

=== The Lunsi ===
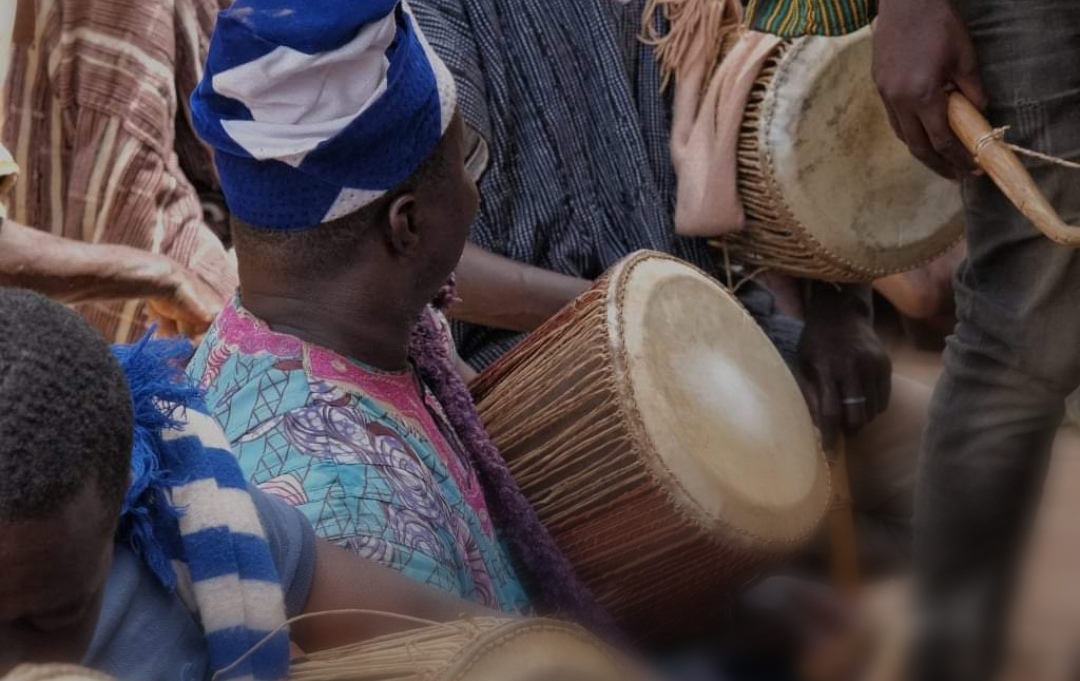
Lunsi of Dagbon

Sound of the Luŋa

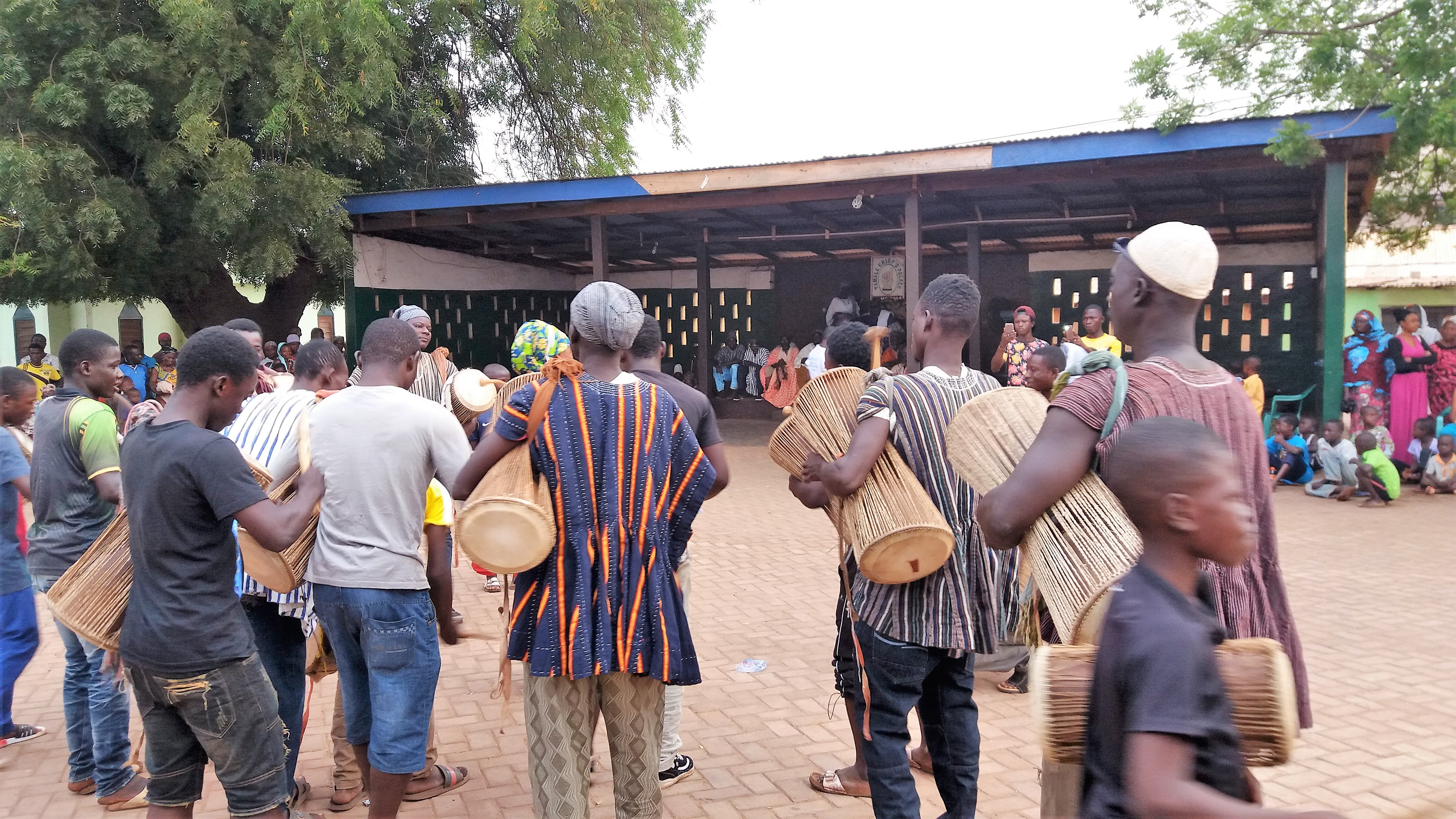
Drummers at Tamale Chief Palace.

The Lunsi of Dagbon form a scholarly family with a unique responsibility of the preservation of historical and genealogical knowledge structured around the lineage of chiefs and royal families. The head of the Lunsi is the Namo Naa. Their method of historical preservation involves the recitation and rhythmic drumming of proverbs, each laden with references to the history of the Dagbon royalty and their achievements. Through this oral tradition, the Lunsi not only safeguard the historical legacy of their people but also serve as the storytellers who continually reaffirm the profound connection between the citizens and their revered royal ancestors.

== Dagbon as a British and German protectorate (1896–1957) ==
Dagbon resisted colonisation as it had a well organised and powerful army. It was a protectorate, not a colony, allowing chiefs in the Kingdom to have independence other chiefs in Southern Ghana did not have. In 1888, Dagbon became part of a neutral zone called Salaga Area, stretching from Yeji to Yendi, that was established to forestall conflict between the Germans and the British. Dagbon had to fight the Germans to the East, resist the British to the West and South, and the French were to the North. The Germans failed to capture Dagbon after multiple attempts. After the Battle of Adibo, Yendi, the capital of Dagbon was deserted. The Gbewaa Palace was burnt and Eastern Dagbon came under German control. Western Dagbon ultimately came under British control. Yendi, where the Yaa Naa resided, came under German control, separating the Yaa Naa from his people in the west.

=== First German expedition in 1896 ===
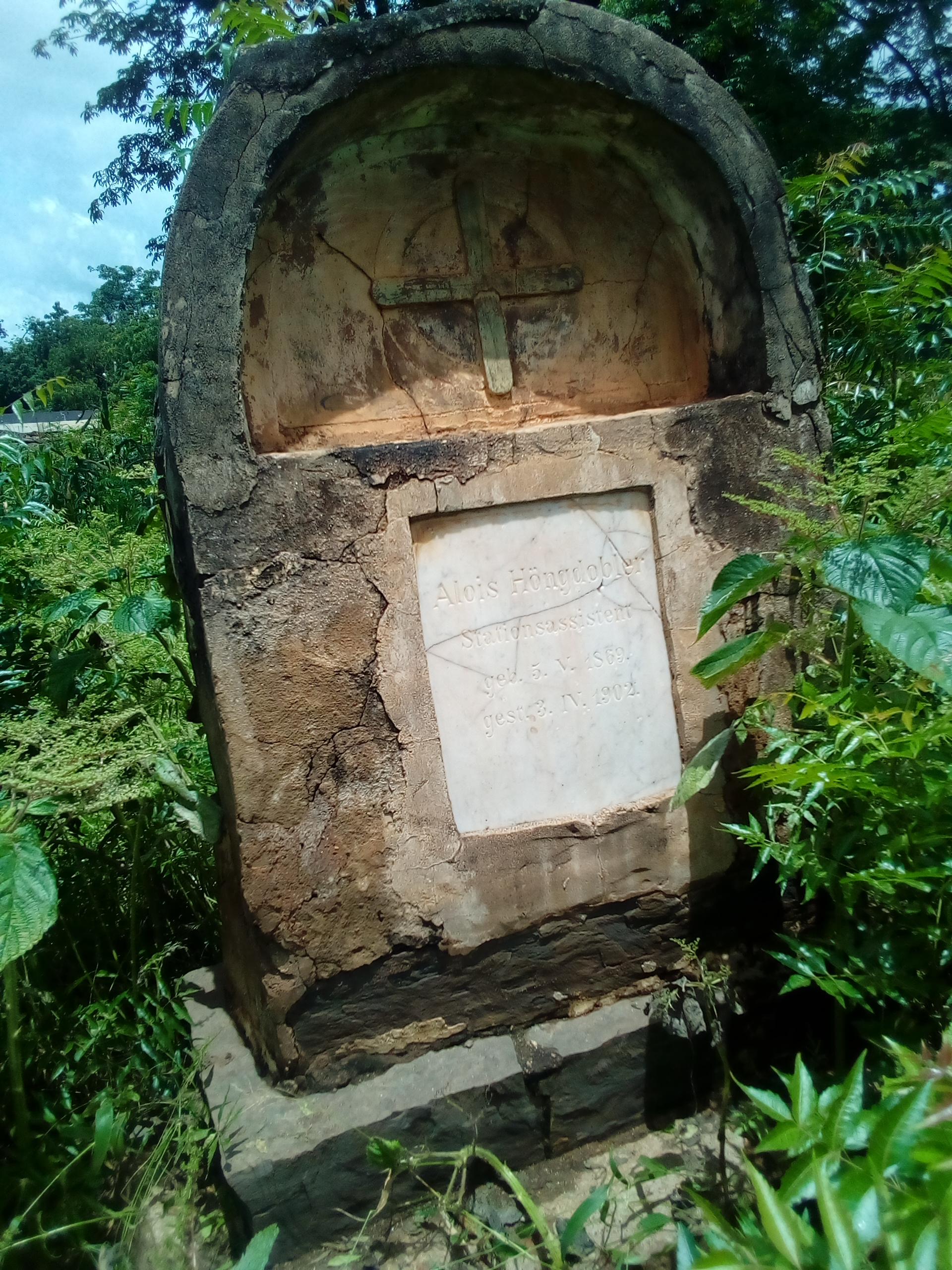
Graveyard of German invaders at Adibo, near Yendi. Dagbon ultimately won the long war for its right to freely exist.

From the point of view of German colonialists, the influential Yaan Naa Andani II had disturbed the trade route from the coast to Sansanné-Mangu, a German colonial station in the hinterland. Naa Andani, however, had already told German colonial administrator Hans Gruner beforehand that he believed that "it is the white man who makes the roads unsafe".

In 1896, the Germans led by Valentin von Massow, Hans Gruner and Gaston Thierry clashed with the Dagomba at the Battle of Adibo, destroyed Yendi and made away with valuables. It was a massacre, as the 7,000-man, poorly equipped Dagomba army merely rushed with their bows and arrows at the 100-man well-armed German army. In 1899 the British and the Germans split Dagbon between German Togoland and the Gold Coast.

=== Second German expedition in 1900 ===
After the death of Yaa Na Andani II in August 1899, disputes over succession to the Dagbon throne were ongoing: Andani's eldest son aspired to become Na of Savelugu and had asked the Dagomba elders to promote the current Savelugu Na to supreme Yaa Naa. However, this suggestion was met with disagreement from Alasan, Na of Karaga, who claimed the throne for himself. German colonial governor August Köhler himself supported Alasan's claim and, in late March 1900, called for a military expedition who was then led by the colonial administrator in Sansanné-Mangu, Friedrich Rigler. The latter led his troops to Yendi on 5 April 1900 but found the town deserted. Meanwhile, Na Andani's eldest son Idi had moved with his retinue to Sang in the Gold Coast colony and gathered up with those who had fled Yendi. These Dagomba thought they were protected from the Germans, but Rigler still attacked them in British territory on 7 April. The German troops killed at least 83 people in the battle, including Andani's son. After coming back to Yendi, Rigler appointed Alasan as the new Yaa Naa of Dagbon.

=== British colonial rule ===
Following World War I, eastern Dagbon became part of the British-administered mandated territories established by the League of Nations and reunited with the west, allowing the Yaa Naa to resume control of his people. The British implemented indirect rule, in which Dagomba chiefs administered local government. The British largely neglected the economic development of Dagbon. To pay the head tax the British imposed, Dagomba had to migrate to the southern Gold Coast to work in mines and on cocoa plantations. The Kingdom of Dagbon enjoyed a distinct constitutional position before it became part of the British Togoland.

=== Recent history ===
Today, the Yaa Naa's court remains at Yendi. The kingdom is divided into territorial chiefdoms, categorised from divisional to village chieftaincies. Certain chieftaincies, such as Karaga, Savalugu and Mion, are reserved for the sons of the former Yaa Naa, and their occupancy qualifies one to test for the Namship, or head chiefdom, at Yendi. Lesser chieftaincies are reserved for grandsons. Succession to the Nam has always rotated among the three royal houses namely Andani Yili, Aburi Yili and Mahami Yili, now reduced to two–the Andani and the Abudu.

Over the past century, the Dagomba have faced repeated succession disputes. Following the death of Yaa-Na Mahama II in 1954, a succession dispute arose and the federal government sent troops to Yendi and intervened.

In March 2002, Ya Naa Yakubu Andani II, from the Andani House, was murdered together with forty-two of his elders in a war by supporters of the Abudu House. After eight years, on 10 April 2010, around thirty to forty people were arrested for the murder in Yendi and parts of Accra in preparation for prosecution.

On 16 November 2018, a Mediation Committee that consisted of three Eminent Chiefs finalized its plan to resolve the conflict in Dagbon. The two Houses agreed to the Committees proposal that the Abudu Royal family perform the funeral rites of the late Yaa Naa Mahamadu Abdulai from 14 to 28 December 2018. Next was to be the funeral of the late Yaa Naa Yakubu Andani II, from 4–19 January 2019. Both obsequies took place at the old Gbewaa Palace in Yendi.

== Military ==
The Sapashina are the military of the Kingdom

== Dance ==
Dance is called Waa in the Dagbani language. Dancing is an important part of the culture of Dagbon. There are several types of dances performed individually or in groups.

== Natural resources ==
=== Mineral resource ===
The kingdom holds the largest iron ore reserve in the country.

=== Flora ===
Trees:

- Adansonia digitata
- Afzelia africana
- Anogeissus leiocarpus
- Afraegle paniculata
- Burkea africana
- Butyrospermum paradoxum
- Cassia sieberana
- Celastrus senegalensis
- Combretum ghasalense
- Detarium microcarpum
- Grewia lasiodiscus
- Grewia mollis
- Lannea acida
- Maytenus senegalensis
- Piliostigma thonningii
- Pterocarpus erinaceus
- Sterculia setigera
- Tamarindus indica
- Terminalia spp., including T. avicennioides
- Ximenia americana

Shrubs:

- Diospyros mespiliformis
- Feretia apodanthera
- Flueggea virosa
- Tinnsea spp.
- Urginea spp.

Herbaceous plants:

- Abutilon ramosum
- Aneilema umbrosum
- Atylosia scarabaeoides
- Blepharis maderaspatensis
- Desmodium velutinum
- Mariscus alternifolius
- Ruellia spp.
- Sida urens
- Triumfetta pentandra
- Wissadula amplissima

Grasslands:

- Andropogon spp., including Andropogon gayanus var. squamulatus (a tall grass)
- Brachiaria spp.
- Loudetiopsis kerstingii

== Foods and diet of Dagbon ==
Yoroyoro is made by boiling maize until it is softened. The food is eaten with pepper and onions

Traditional breakfast is made of koko or kukuaɣli (porridge) made from either of maize, millet, guinea or a mixture of flours.

Common foods include sakoro (pounded yam), mochi ni tuya (rice and beans), aduwa (cowpea), yoroyoro, nyombieka, wasawasa, sagatuliga (tz) and sinkpela

=== Types of porridge prepared in Dagbon ===
- Chi koko (made from guinea corn)
- Koko Talli (made from maize or millet or guinea corn)
- Kukuɣa nyina (any porridge with sizeable, chewable soft maize or millet)
- Za koko (made from millet)
- Zimbɛiɣu (porridge whose floor is made from mixtures of floor from maize, beans, millet, soybeans and others)
- Zimbuli (porridge from coarse flour)

== See also ==
- Adibo dali
- Dagbani language
- List of rulers of the Kingdom of Dagbon
- Notable Dagombas
