= Red Hunter (Tohaʒee) =

Ghanaian and Burkinabe historical figure

The Red Hunter or Tohaʒee is a Ghanaian and Burkinabe historical figure whose progeny founded the Dagbon and Mossi Kingdoms.

He arrived in northern Ghana in the 15th century, coming across a village that was being terrorised by a bull preventing people from drawing drinking water from a river. After slaying the bull, he was presented with the village chief's daughter as a wife, who gave him a son named Kpogon-umbo. Kpogon-umbo had a son named Naa Gbewaa, who is regarded as the first king of the Mamprugu, Dagbon, and Nanumba kingdoms.
