= Bawku =

Town and district capital in Upper East Region, Ghana

- Town & district capital
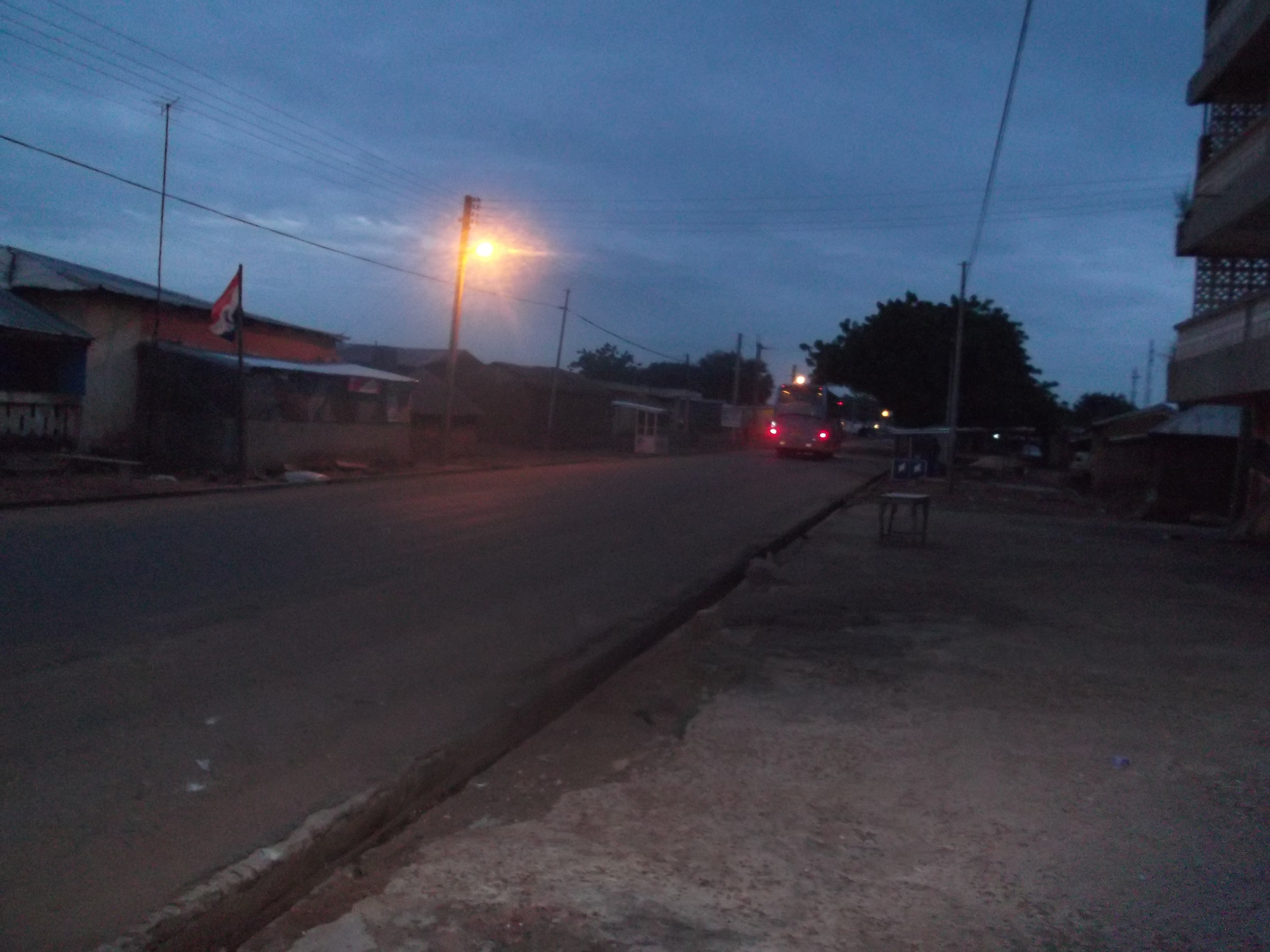

- Location of Bawku in Upper East Region
- Coordinates: 11°3′36″N 0°14′24″W
- Country: Ghana
- Region: Upper East Region
- District: Bawku Municipal District

Population (2012)
  - Total: 69,527
- Time zone: GMT
  - Summer (DST): GMT

Bawku is a town in and the capital of Bawku Municipal District, Upper East Region, in north Ghana, adjacent to the border with Burkina Faso. The municipality has a total land area of about 257 km^{2}. It was established by Legislative Instrument (L.I) 2103. In 2021, Bawku had a population of 119,458 people.

== Cultural and tourist sites ==
=== Naa Gbewaa shrine ===
The "tomb" of Naa Gbewaa, a shrine to the founder of the Mamprusi, Dagomba, and Nanumba tribes, is located just a few kilometers from Bawku in Pusiga, in the Upper East Region of Ghana. The shrine is thought to have been built in the 14th century, and it is a place of spiritual reverence.

== Bawku conflict ==
The Bawku conflict is a long-standing chieftaincy and ethnic dispute primarily between the Kusasi and Mamprusi communities in and around the Bawku Municipal District, near the border with Burkina Faso, dating back to 1957. Rooted in the colonial indirect-rule framework and sharpened by post-independence policy reversals, the dispute centres on claims to the paramount chieftaincy (the Bawku skin) and associated land authority. Periodic escalations have led to deaths, injuries, displacement, curfews, and significant economic and social disruption. In July 2025, the government again deployed additional soldiers and tightened curfews following renewed violence, including attacks on schools.
