= Pusiga =

- District Capital
- Location of Pusiga in Upper East Region
- Coordinates: 11°05′05″N 00°07′40″W
- Country: Ghana
- Region: Upper East Region
- District: Pusiga
- Elevation: 252 m (827 ft)
- Time zone: GMT
  - Summer (DST): GMT
- Ghana Post GPS: UP
- Area code: 03822

Pusiga is a town in the Upper East Region of Ghana.

== History ==
Pusiga was previously located within the eastern part of the Bawku Municipal District. On 28 June 2012, the district was split in 3. The eastern portion became the Pusiga district. It was at this stage that Pusiga became the district capital. The district assembly is thus located in Pusiga.

== Location ==
The Ghana - Togo border is about 1.6km to the northeast. Kulungugu is located to the north west. To the west is Bawku, capital of the Bawku Municipal District. 90 km to the west is Bolgatanga, the regional capital.

== Notable sites ==
It is believed that the founder of the Mole-Dagbon people, Naa Gbewaa settled at Pusiga and died during the 13th century. There is a shrine dedicated to him at Pusiga.
