= Designation =

Designation may refer to:

- Designation (law), the process of determining an incumbent's successor
- Professional certification
- Designation (landmarks), an official classification determined by a government agency or historical society
- Designation Scheme, a system for recognising library and museum collections in England

== See also ==
- United States Department of Defense aerospace vehicle designation
- Designate (Columbia)
- Design
