= Bugum Chugu =

Festival in Ghana by the Dagombas

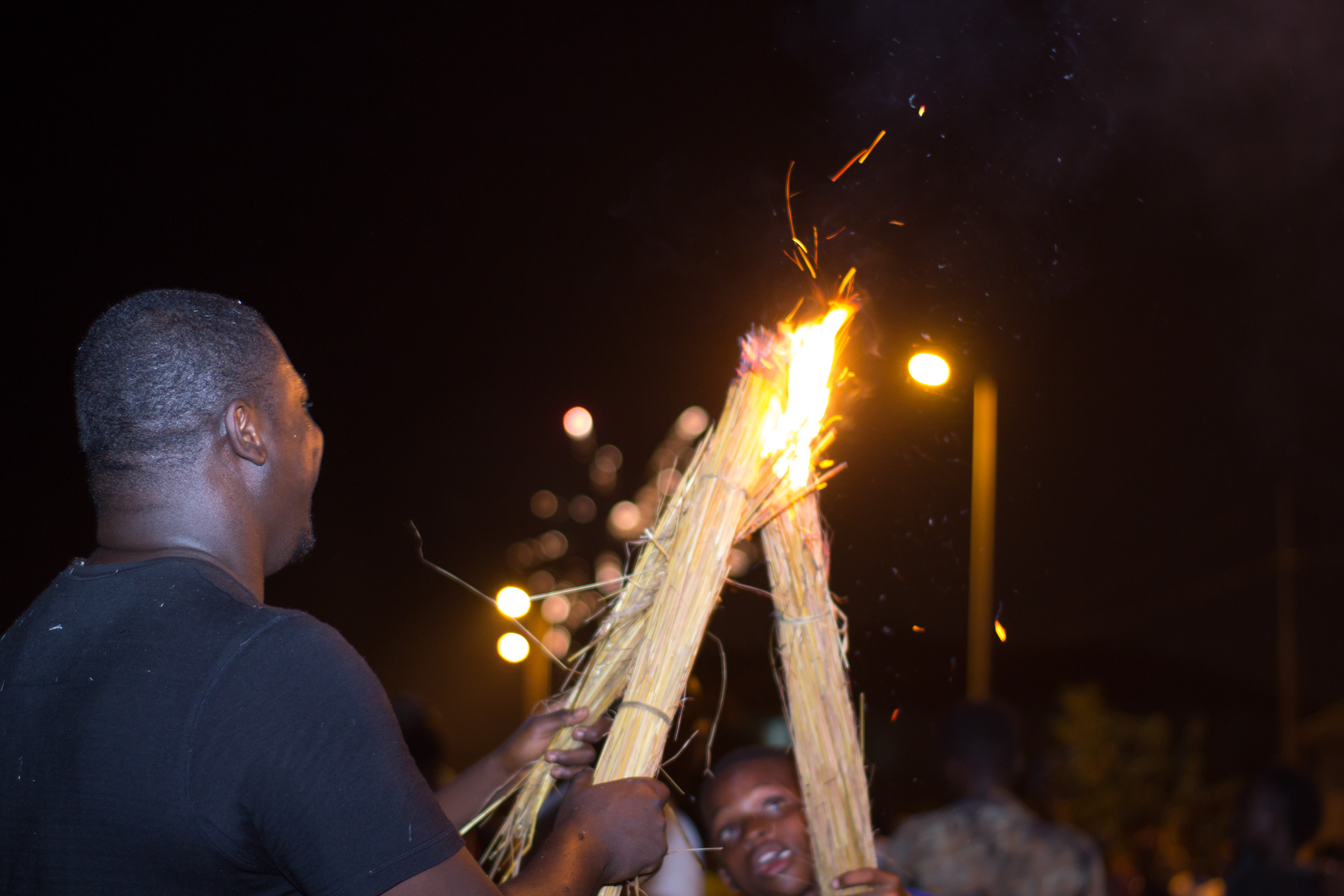
- Fire festival celebration in Tamale
- Genre: Local Fire festival
- Dates: 9th day of Bugum Goli
- Frequency: Annual
- Location: Northern Region (Ghana)
- Years active: 800+
- Attendance: 500,000 (2013)

The Buɣim Chuɣu (Fire Festival) is the first Dagomba festival in the year. It is celebrated in the first month of the Dagomba lunar year, the Buɣim Goli (the month of fire), and is celebrated on the ninth day of the month. The festival is celebrated to remember the "lost son of a king" during ancient Dagbon.

== Traditional Origin Story ==
The origin of the Buɣim Festival dates back to the time when one king lost his dear son. The name of the king and the said son are no longer known. It is thought that the event took place before the unification of Dagbon by Naa Gbewaa. Naa Gbewaa and his descendants started chieftaincy in Dagbon, ŋmamprugu, Nanung, Wala, Mossi, Bouna, etc. The story has it that a child went out to play with his colleagues and as they played, he became tired and went and laid down under a tree. He soon fell asleep. The other children forgot of him and went home when they finished playing. In the evening, the parents (king and wife) did not see him. The king thought he was with the mother and the mother also thought the child was with the father. After supper that the mother called on the king to take the child to bed. It was at that moment that they found that the child was not with any of them. The king ordered his subjects to go round the neighborhood in search for the son. They did not find him. Even, the children he went out with could not remember.

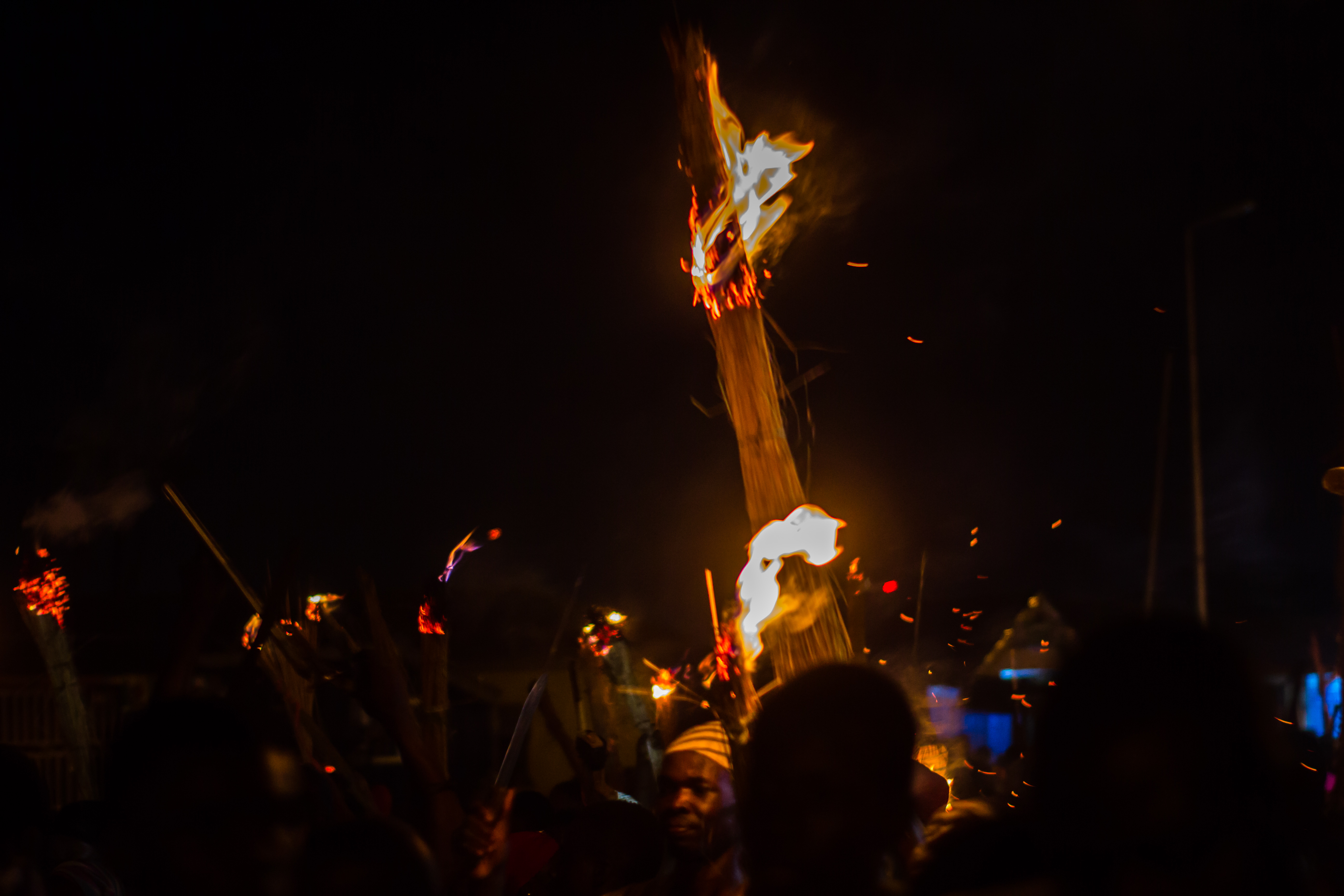
Fire Festival Celebration in Tamale, Ghana

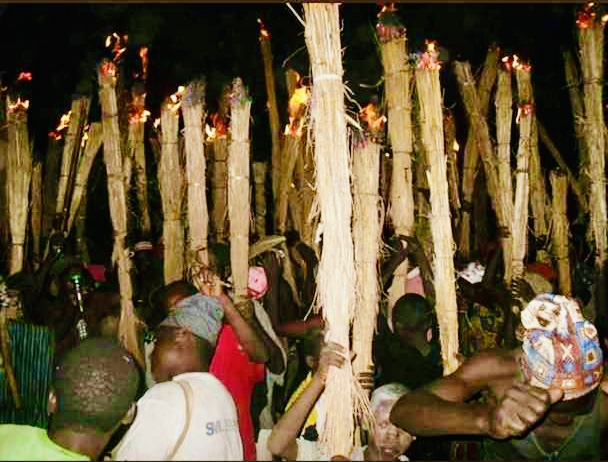
Fire Festival in Gonja

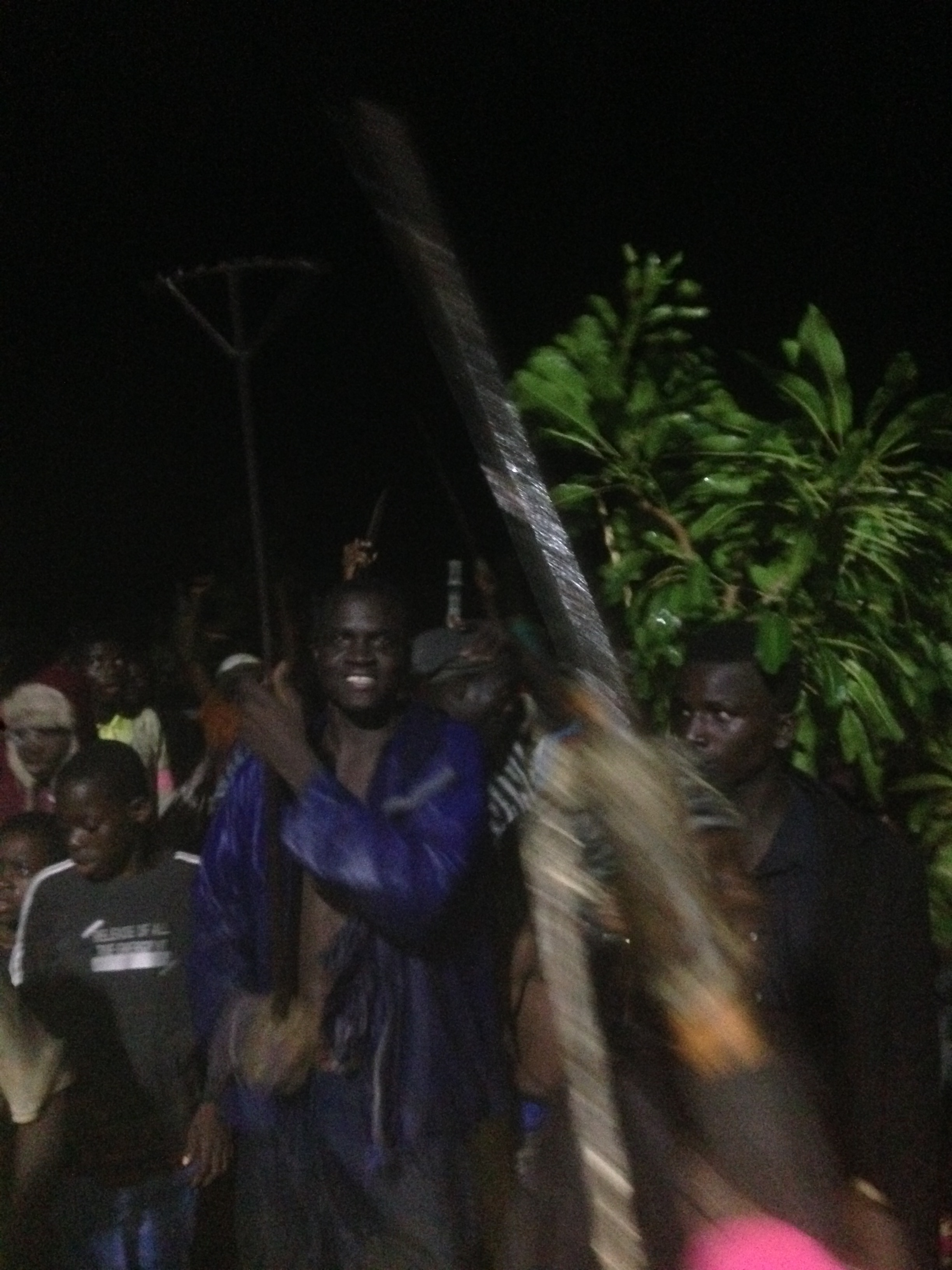
Celebrants dancing zhem during the 2021 fire festival in Northern Region (Ghana)

The king quickly assembled his warriors and told them what had transpired. The warriors were instructed to look for the son. Because it was at night and dark, the people lit torches in search of him. Finally they found him under a tree deeply asleep. They sent him to his parents who were desperately waiting for his arrival. The parents thought that the tree stole the child and hid him. They therefore considered the tree an evil tree and threw the torches they were carrying on that tree and shamed it. The community at that time regarded that particular tree as an evil tree and many feared it. The king decreed that the event should be marked yearly to commemorate the event. Every year they assembled in front of the king's palace to celebrate the festival. When they set fire, the king or the chief used to be the first to lite the fire with his torch. The chief did not go far and dropped his torch and returned home. The people continued the practice and used to go to the evil tree and threw their torches on it. While marching to the evil tree, they played and danced "ziem," a dance for the tindaamba 'land priests'. The people used to and still dress as warriors when celebrating Buɣim Chugu in Dagbon.

== Islamic Origin Story ==
An alternate origin story of the festival states that it dates back to the time the Prophet Noah landed his Ark on Mount Arafat. According to this tradition, when the Ark of Noah landed at the end of the floods the passengers lit torches to 1) find their way around and 2) to find the son of prophet Noah who failed to enter the Ark when it set out with the believers. To buttress this claim of the origin of the Buɣim Festival, some Muslim Dagombas further claim that they are descendants of the Aad, a prehistoric Arab tribe that succeeded Noah and his people.

This version of the festival's origin is problematic for several reasons. First, such a festival is not celebrated by the Muslim world. Second, the Mamprusi who are related to the Dagomba through their common ancestor Naa Gbewa believe in the traditional story. Finally, Dagbamba (Dagomba) do not originate from Aad and had nothing to do with Arabs. Dagbani is a Gur language and all tribes who celebrate the festivals are Gur: Mamprusi, Nanumba, Gonja, Waala and Chakosi/Anufo. One may argue that because they are among the Gur people that they adopted the festival.

== Observance ==
When the people are celebrating Buɣim Chugu, they dance ziem even to this very day. Ziem is a dance for the" tindaamba". It is older than any other dance in Dagbon. It is played with gungong, which is older than any instrument in Dagbon. The people also play ziem when they are going to war. It is played when there is a communal labor. They again play ziem when a tindana 'land priest' dies. The early kings quickly adopted the playing of ziem during the installation and death of Yaan Naa and chiefs to make them acceptable to the aboriginal Dagbamba. In the olden days not all villages had the gungong, because of that villages which were closer to each other used to meet in one village where they celebrate the Buɣim Chuɣu and danced Ziem. Even now, is still happening.

Buɣim Chuɣu is a typical traditional festival celebrated with traditional and local tools such as torches and the celebrants dress like warriors and they often carry cudgels and cutlasses along. They play and dance ziem as they celebrate the festival. On the night of the festival, people gather in mosques for prayers. Waligu is then shared among participants and children who drink it for blessings for the new year. On the morning after the celebration, prayers are again said at various chief palaces and prophecies are said about the upcoming year. Prophecies include possibility of bumper harvest, drought, fires, births, diseases and deaths.

Islam became a state religion in Dagbon by Naa Zanjina. However, there is evidence of Islam in Dagbon prior to Naa Zanjina. For example, the Larabanga mosque is about six hundred years old. Buɣum Chugu was celebrated before the arrival of the Islam. Now, the festival is celebrated by both Muslims, Christians and Traditionalists alike.

== Ceremony's preparation ==
The celebration of the festival starts on the ninth day of Buɣim Goli. Normally, except essential services such as fetching of water, grinding of flour, sale of meat and taking care of the sick, no work is allowed to be done on any Dagomba festival day. So on this day everyone (men, women and children) stays at home. The men start the day moving round each other's homes to say good morning and Happy New Year. Everyone is heard saying "Ni ti yuun palli" (literally and our new year). After a brief exchange of the new year greetings, people sit at home and engage in normal conversation. The young boys look for dry grass to prepare long torches for distribution to their grandparents, grand aunts, grand uncles and maternal uncles. After preparation, the boys take them to the homes of the recipients. As the afternoon approaches most house owners kill fowl, guinea-fowl, goats or sheep to feast on. The feast is done both in the afternoon and in the evening. Homes that cannot afford animals or fowl may buy meat from the butchers. The most common soup for supper on the night of the festival is made from the leaves of a tree called puhuga (Tamaridus Indica). Even though every home cooks food for the day and the night, everybody distributes food to friends and relatives. There is so much food for the day that not even half of it would be eaten. After eating the evening meal, morsels and pieces of meat are cut and placed on the short walls in the house. This food is said to be for the dead ancestors of the person who put it there. The food is also said to be for God. The people make their vows and declarations while placing the food on the walls. They ask God to give them a long life, or a husband, or children or any other thing. They vow to do or abstain from some action.

== Ceremony's ritual ==
The actual ceremony for the festival starts after the evening meal. The drum beater comes to the palace to sound the drum. He, through the drumming, summons the tom-tom beaters and the Elders of the state the in palace. As they arrive one after the other, the commoners also come along. When everybody is gathered outside the palace, the Elders of state led by the chief linguist, enter the chief's court to invite him outside. Some of the Elders lead the way and the chief follows. The rest of the elders follow the chief. Before the chief comes out, everybody is ready with his or her torch of grass. The chief is the first to light his torch. The chief is led a little distance from where the crowd is gathered to cast away his lit-up torch. He moves back into the palace as the multitude of people yell and chant in a war-like manner amidst the deafening sound of the tom-tom and drums. There is usually a spot at the outskirts of the town where the multitude of people move to for the celebration of the Buɣim Festival. Everybody holds high his or her burning torch. To prevent drops of fire from falling onto their clothes and burning them, many of the celebrators wet their clothes. Except for a few girls who are daredevils, women are hardly seen in the crowd. They usually stay in their homes or at the outside of the palace until the crowd returns. Then they join in the closing chants and dance for the evening.

== Ceremony's tools and mood ==
The people hold not only their torches but also swords, cutlasses, knives, bows, arrows and cudgels. The mood of the people is war-like. The atmosphere is heavily charged and it may appear ominous to any person who has never witnessed the occasion.

== See also ==
- Damba festival
