= Sulemana Abubakari =

Traditional ruler of Tolon in Northern Ghana

Sulemana Abubakari Tolon Naa, Major
- Born: Sulemana Abubakari; 1943; Tali, Tolon, Northern Region, Ghana
- Died: August 23 2026; Tolon
- Other name: Major (Rtd.) Sulemana
- Occupations: Soldier, Chief
- Father: Alhassan Sulemana

Major (Rtd.) Sulemana (born Sulemana Abubakari in 1943 at Tali, Tolon, Ghana). Was a Ghanaian military officer and a traditional ruler. He joined the Ghana Armed Forces in the early 1960s and later served as the Tolon Naa, the traditional ruler for the Tolon traditional area in Dagbon.

Sulemana died on the 23rd August, 2026 after a short illness.
