= Stanley Yaw Nandaya =

Ghanaian politician

Hon. Stanley Yaw Nandaya

Member of Parliament for Wulensi
- Incumbent
- Assumed office January 2025
- President: John Mahama

Personal details
- Born: October 10, 1977 (age 48) Lungni, Ghana
- Party: Independent
- Education: Institute of Commercial Management (ICM); University of Cape Coast
- Occupation: Politician, Administrator

Stanley Yaw Nandaya (born 10 October 1977) is a Ghanaian politician and administrator. He is the Member of Parliament for the Wulensi Constituency in the Northern Region of Ghana. He was elected as an independent candidate in the 2024 general elections and assumed office in January 2025.

== Early life and education ==
Nandaya hails from Lungni in the Northern Region of Ghana. He completed his Senior Secondary School Certificate Examination (SSSCE) at Snaps College/KAS Complex in December 1996. He obtained a Diploma from the University of Cape Coast in 2010 and a Higher Diploma in Management and Administration from the Institute of Commercial Management (ICM) in 2011. In 2018, he completed a Diploma in Theology from the Living Word School Ministry, which is affiliated with Central University.

== Career ==
Prior to entering Parliament, Nandaya worked in both the education and hospitality sectors. He served as the General Manager of Greenfield Hotel and as the Director of Whitefield Classic School. In the 2024 general elections, he contested the Wulensi parliamentary seat as an independent candidate and won. He began his first term in Parliament in January 2025 and currently serves as a member of the Environment, Science and Technology Committee and the Ways and Means Committee.
