= Gundonaa Samata Abudu =

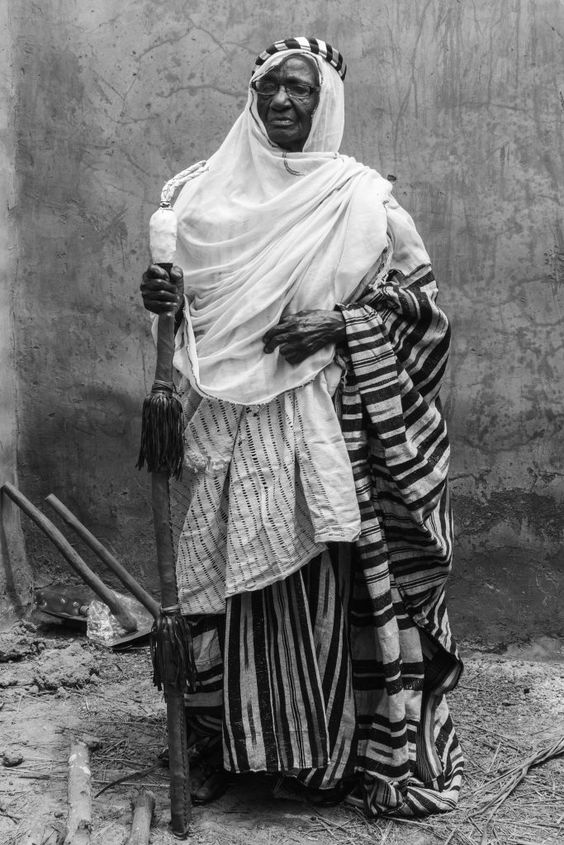
Gundonaa Samata Abudu

Gundonaa Hajia Samata Abudu is the Paramount woman Chief of the Dagbon traditional area in the Northern Region of Ghana. All women Chiefs in that area are subordinate to her. She heads the Gundogu skin, the female equivalent of the Yendi skin, which is headed by the Yaa-Naa. The Gundonaa is the only Chief, be it male or female, who is able to veto the Yaa-Naa's word. She is assisted in her duties by the Kpatunaa, a female Chief of the Kpatuya clan.

The position of Gundonaa can only be occupied by a daughter of a Yaa-Naa. Gundonaa Hajia Samata Abudu is also the granddaughter of Kachegu Naa who was the daughter and eldest surviving child of Naa Gbewaa (the founder of the Dagbon Kingdom), and became the King of Dagbon after he died.

She is a member of the Abudu household and royal family.

== Early life and career ==
Gundonaa Hajia Samatu Abudu was born on March 9, 1926. She is a former trader of cereals.

She is one of the several women traditional leaders whose leadership is being studied under a University of Ghana project titled "Women and Political Participation in Africa: A Comparative Study of Representation and Role of Female Chiefs", which is funded by the Andrew W. Mellon Foundation. In this project, a mixed-methods approach is adopted to comparatively study women's representation in the institution of chieftaincy and their influence on women's rights and wellbeing in Botswana, Ghana, Liberia, and South Africa. Lead researchers on the project, Peace A. Medie, Adriana A. E Biney, Amanda Coffie and Cori Wielenga, have also published an opinion piece titled "Women traditional leaders could help make sure the pandemic message is heard" in The Conversation news, which discusses how women traditional leaders can educate their subjects on COVID-19.
