= Salaga Area =

Coordinates: 9.0000°N 0.6667°W

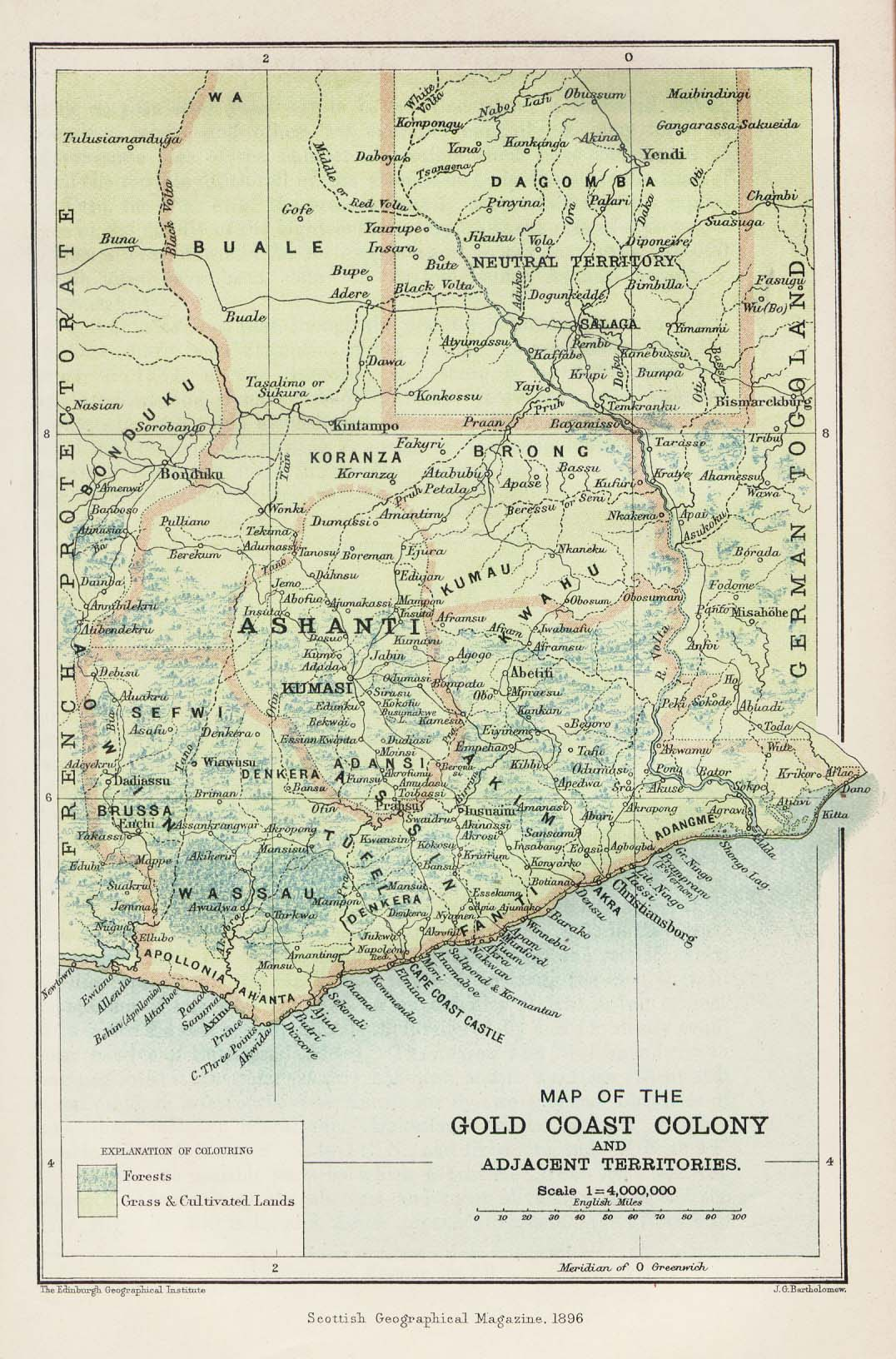
The Salaga Area (here marked as "Neutral Territory" ) in the northeast Gold Coast in 1896

The Salaga Area (German: Salaga-Gebiet) was the name of a disputed territory between the colonial powers Germany and Britain in the late 19th century, around the town of Salaga in today's northeast Ghana. Between 1889 and 1899, both powers considered the territory between their colonies of Togoland (Germany) and Gold Coast (UK), which was largely identical with the Kingdom of Dagomba, as neutral.

In the course of the Tripartite Convention (1899) the area was split between German Togoland and the British Gold Coast. The Tripartite Convention mainly regulated the colonial division of the Pacific islands of Samoa, but the 5th of 6 articles of the Treaty regulated the distribution of Salaga. Following the defeat of Germany in World War I, France and Britain divided Togoland in 1919, and the whole of Salaga Area eventually came under British rule, and thus finally became part of the newly independent state of Ghana in 1957.
