= Binduri (district) =

District in Upper East Region, Ghana

Binduri District
- District
- Districts of Upper East Region

- Location of Binduri District within Upper East
- Coordinates: 10°58′19.56″N 0°18′23.76″W
- Country: Ghana
- Region: Upper East
- Capital: Binduri

Population (2021)
  - Total: 76,679
- Time zone: UTC+0 (GMT)
- ISO 3166 code: GH-UE-BN

Binduri District is one of the fifteen districts in Upper East Region, Ghana. Originally it was formerly part of the then-larger Bawku Municipal District in 1988; until two parts of the district were later split off to create Binduri District (from the west) and Pusiga District (from the east) respectively on 28 June 2012. The district assembly is located in the eastern part of Upper East Region and has Binduri as its capital town. The capital of Binduri District is Binduri town.

Like many districts in the Upper East Region, agriculture likely plays a significant role in the local economy. Many residents are engaged in subsistence farming and petty trading.

Binduri Community Senior High (Bindusec) is a senior high school located in the district

The predominant local language spoken in Binduri is Kusaal, which is common in that part of Ghana.

The district experiences a tropical savanna climate, typical of northern Ghana, with a single rainy season followed by a long dry season.

Their member of parliament is Hon. Issifu Mahmoud
