= Bawku Municipal District =

Municipal district in Upper East region, Ghana

Bawku Municipal District District Municipal de Bawku
- Municipal District
- Districts of Upper East Region

- Location of Bawku Municipal District within Upper East
- Coordinates: 11°3′14.76″N 0°14′18.6″W
- Country: Ghana
- Region: Upper East
- Capital: Bawku

Government
  - Municipal Chief Executive: Isaac Azunaba

Area
  - Total: 1,275 km^{2} (492 sq mi)

Population (2021)
  - Total: 119,458
- Time zone: UTC+0 (GMT)
- ISO 3166 code: GH-UE-BA

Bawku Municipal District is one of the fifteen districts in Upper East Region, Ghana. Originally created as an ordinary district assembly in 1988 when it was known as Bawku East District; which was established by Legislative Instrument (L.I.) 1439, until the southern part of the district was split off by a decree of president John Agyekum Kufuor in August 2004 to create Garu-Tempane District; thus the remaining part was elevated to municipal district assembly status on the same year to become Bawku Municipal District. However, on 28 June 2012, two parts of the district were later split off to create Binduri District (from the west) and Pusiga District (from the east) respectively; thus the remaining part has been retained as Bawku Municipal District. The municipality is located in the eastern part of Upper East Region and has Bawku as its capital town.

== Demographics ==
The population of Bawku Municipal District, according to the 2021 population census stands at 119,458. Males constitute 48.0 percent and females represent 52.0 percent. 36.4 percent of the population is rural and 63.6 percent is urban. It shares boundaries with Pusiga District to the north, Binduri District to the south, Garu-Tempane District to the east and Bawku West District to the west.

The Kusasis claimed to be the first known settlers in the area. The other tribes in the area are the Bisas, Mossi, Mamprusis, Hausas etc. There are however large immigrant populations from other locations in northern and southern Ghana as well as from Burkina Faso, Ivory Coast, Togo, Niger and Nigeria.

Of the population 11 years and above, 47.8% are literate and 52.2% are nonliterate. The proportion of literate males is higher (57.6%) than that of females (39.3%).

== Economy ==
Agriculture is the dominant occupation of the people of the municipality, accounting for about 47.0 percent of the total occupation in the municipality. The major crops grown are millet, sorghum, maize, rice, groundnuts, leafy vegetables, potatoes, groundnuts, pepper, watermelon, and onion. Livestock such as cattle, sheep, goats, donkeys etc. are also kept in the district.

== Festivals ==
The festivals celebrated in the district are the Samanpiid which is celebrated by the Kusaasi people, Zekula by the Bissa people, Danguud by the Bimoba people and Buud-Yelle by the Mossi people.

== Administrative divisions ==
The district contains the following towns and villages. Of note are:

- Bawku
- Zebilla
- Pusiga
- Garu
- Denugu/Danvorga
- Kongo
- Zawse
- Kulungungu
- Jintiga
- Tempane
- Wuriyanga
- Narango
- Mognori
- Gumbo
- Sarabogo
- Widana
- Yabrago
- Missiga
- Bugri-Bulpielse
- Manga
- Basyonde
- Binduri Natinga
- Kulugungu
- Gozesi
- Bugri
- Bado

== Gallery ==
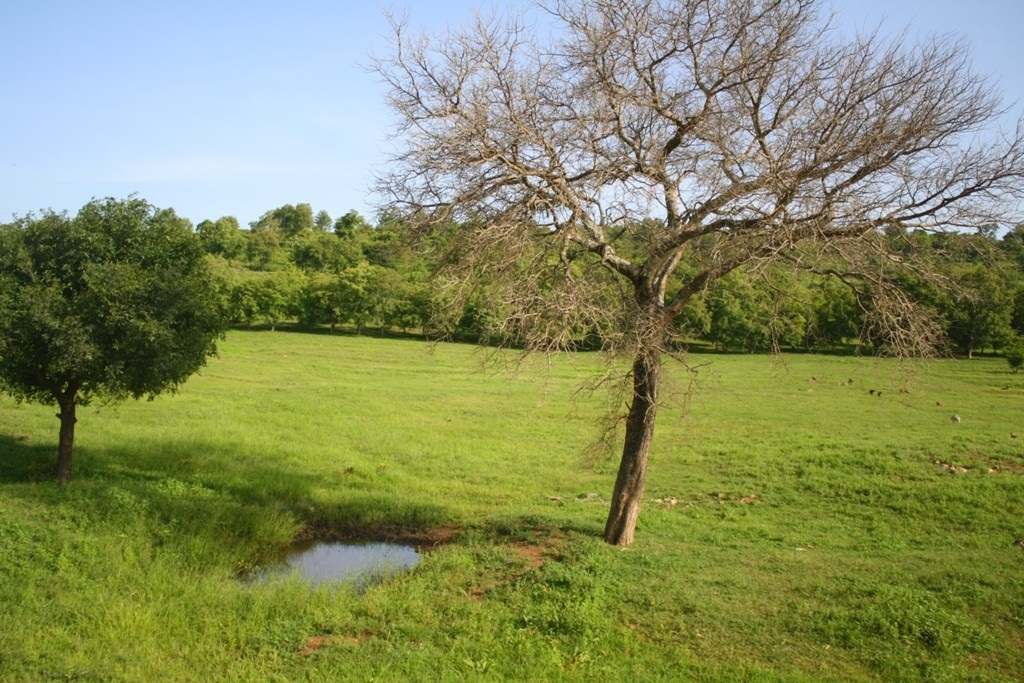
Bawku Landscape in the Rainy Season

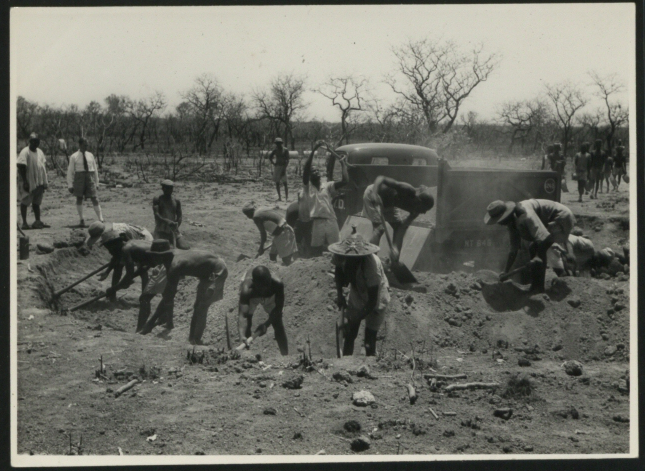
Work on the Yendi-Bawku Road. 1953

== Sources ==
- "Districts of Ghana". Statoids.
