= World Damba Festival =

Ghanaian festival hosted abroad

World Damba Festival Festival mondial de Damba

World Damba Festival is an enactment of the Damba festival of Northern Ghana by Ghanaians living in other parts of the world. World Damba festival was first celebrated in 1999 in Louisville, Kentucky. London hosted the event in 2012. Other cities that have hosted the festival include Boston in Massachusetts, Amsterdam, and Brussels.

== Timeline of events ==
2023: Cologne - Germany (related images on Wikimedia Commons)

2021: New Jersey - United States

2019: Madina Greater Accra - Ghana

2012: London - United Kingdom, Boston Massachusetts - United States

1999: Louisville Kentucky - United States
