= Diare =

Community in the Northern Region of Ghana

Diare is a community in the Savelugu Municipal District in the Northern Region ofGhana. Most of the inhabitants are farmers especially the men.
