= Tindana =

Historical title in West Africa

Tindana (Plural Tindamba/Tindaanima) is a title for historical rulers of the Dagbon and many other related peoples of West Africa. The tindaanima ruled over these lands before the centralisation of the states by Naa Gbewaa and his descendants. Their historical roles had been religious and spiritual, although this has been changing, with Tindaanima like the Tamale Dakpema, actively engaged in traditional political rulership. The Tindaanima are not appointed by the Yaa Naa, although they are under his authority.

== Etymology ==
Tindana is derived from the Dagbanli words: Tiŋ/Ting (Land/Town/City) and Dana (Lord/Owner).
