= Yennenga =

12th century West African princess

Princess Yennenga
- Princess
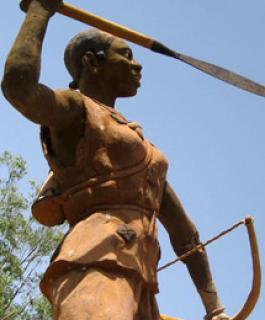
- Statue of Yennenga, an emblematic figure in Burkina Faso
- Born: 11th-15th century Gambaga
- House: Kingdom of Dagbon
- Father: Naa Gbewaa (King Nedega)
- Mother: Napoko

Yennenga (fl. 12th century), considered the mother of the Mossi people of Burkina Faso, "has entered into legend, though [her story] may have a core of truth". One of the king's horsemen helped Yennenga, disguised as a man, escape on her stallion. She was a famous warrior within the Kingdom of Dagbon, now in present day Ghana. The founder of the Kingdom of Dagbon was her father, Nedega. Nedega refused to let Yennenga marry, resulting in her leaving the kingdom. On the run with her horse, she met a young hunter, Rialé with whom she had a child called Ouedraogo. Ouedraogo is a famous last name in Burkina Faso and means "male horse" in honour of the horse that led the princess to Rialé. Yennenga or her son Ouedraogo is considered the founder of the Mossi Kingdoms. There are different versions about the escape of the princess.

== Biography ==
Yennenga was the daughter of Nedega and Napoko, king and queen in the early 12th century of the Kingdom of Dagbon, now in present day Ghana. She is described in oral histories as beautiful, with her name, Yennenga, meaning "the slim", referring to her beauty. Her father raised her to be a skilled hunter and fighter and from the age of 14, she fought in battles for her father against the neighbouring Malinkés. Skilled with javelins, spears and bows, she was an excellent horsewoman and commanded her own battalion. She became a cultural icon, a woman with a strong character and an independent mind, and a beloved princess.

When Yennenga reached a marriageable age, her father refused to choose a husband for her, or allow her to marry, because of her value as a warrior. To express her unhappiness to her father, Yennenga planted a field of wheat. When the crop grew, she let it rot. She explained to her father that was how being unable to marry made her feel. Nedega was unmoved by this gesture and locked his daughter up. One of the king's horsemen helped Yennenga, disguised as a man, escape on her stallion. Attacked by Malinkés, her companion was killed, and Yennenga was left alone. She continued to ride north. One night, when she was exhausted from crossing a river, Yennenga's stallion took her into a forest. She met and befriended a solitary elephant hunter called Rialé. When he saw through Yennenga's disguise, they fell in love. Yennenga and Rialé had a son they named Ouedraogo, which means "stallion" and is now a common name in Burkina Faso.

Ouedrago visited his grandfather Nedega, who has been searching for Yennenga over the years. On discovering that his daughter was still alive, Nadega arranged for a feast and sent delegates to retrieve his beloved daughter back home. Yennenga together with Rialé returned to the Kingdom of Dagbon to her father's open arms. He ensured that his grandson Ouedraogo received the best of trainings. He was also gifted with cavalry, cattle, and other goods that he used to found the Mossi Kingdom.

== Legacy ==
Yennenga is considered by the Mossi people to be the mother of their empire and many statues of her can be found in the capital city of Burkina Faso, Ouagadougou.

A statue of a golden stallion, called the Étalon de Yennenga, is awarded as the first prize in the biennial Panafrican Film and Television Festival of Ouagadougou (FESPACO).

The national football team is nicknamed "Les Étalons" ("the Stallions") in reference to Yennenga's stallion.

In March 2017, an international competition to design a master plan and urban strategy for a new city called Yennenga to be constructed 15 km (9.3 mi) from Ouagadougou, was held. Hardel Le Bihan Architectes were announced as winners of the competition. The project, which is expected to accommodate around 80,000 people over 678 ha (1,680 acres), was under construction as of February 2026.

== In media ==
- La fille de la Volta
- LOOFO
