= Lungni =

Village in Ghana

Coordinates: 8.5549°N 0.0062°W

Lungni is a village in the Northern region of Ghana, it is in the Wulensi District. Lungni is part of the territory of the Nanumbas a variant of the Dagomba ethnic group. The village over the years has had disputes regarding who provides candidates for the role of chieftaincy. To this extent the Nanumbas, Komkombas and Bassares have all laid claim to it. Lungni is sandwiched between Kpandae and wulensi. The inhabitants are predominantly farmers who grow yam and cereals. The village has a primary and junior secondary school but not a secondary school.
