= Nanumba people =

Mole-Dagbon ethnic group in the Eastern Corridor of Ghana

Nanung Kingdom (Nanumba)
Nanunba
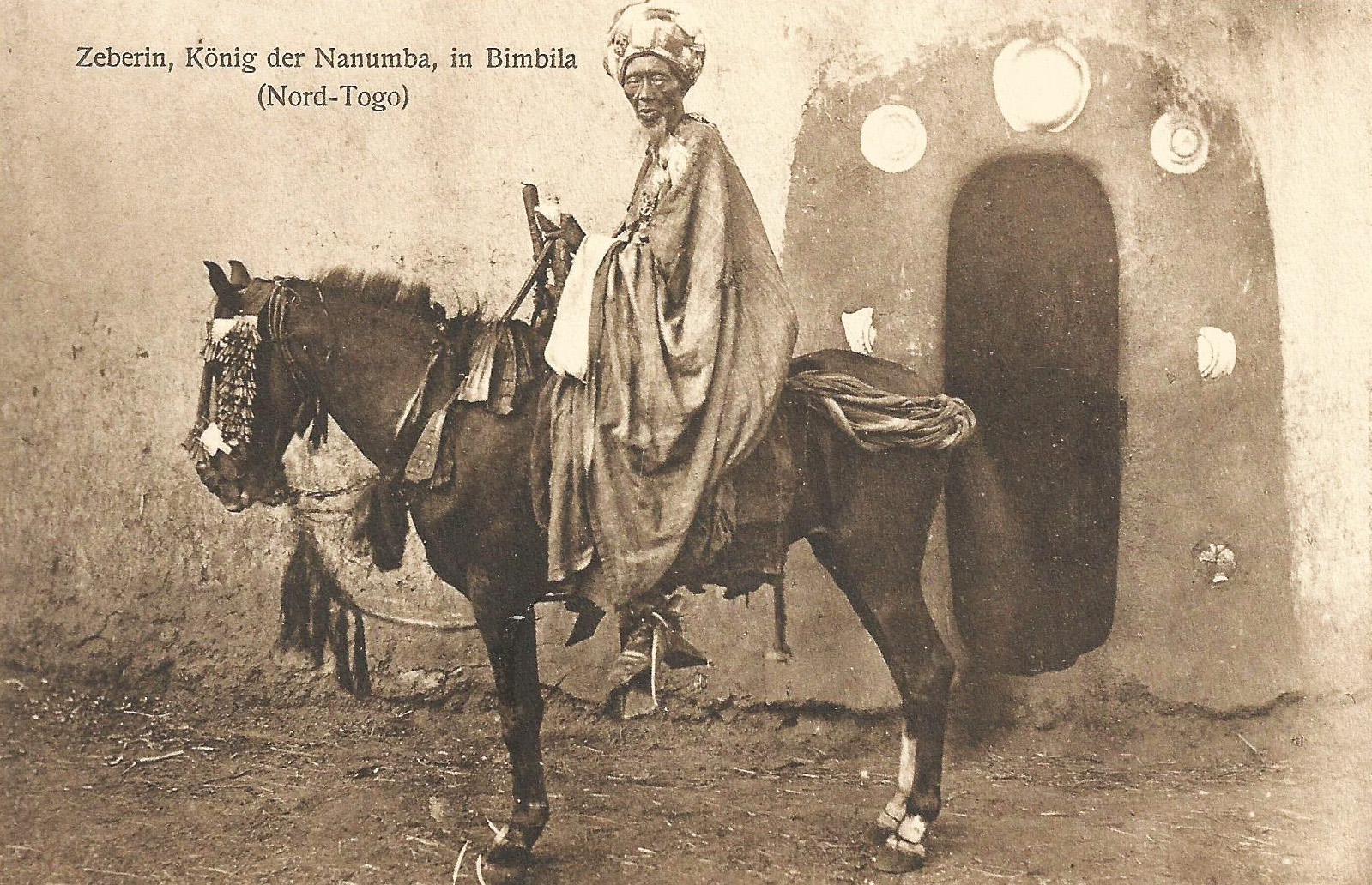

Total population
- 78,812 (2000)

Languages
- Nanungli,

Religion
- Islam, Christianity, Traditional African religion

Related ethnic groups
- Mole-Dagbon people

The Nanumbas are an ethnic group in Northern Region of Ghana. They speak Nanungli (var. Nanungsili), a Gur language.

== Geography ==
Nanumba's traditional homeland (Nanung Kingdom) stretches from Eastern corridor Duoni, Bimbilla, Nakpayili, Wulensi, Lungni, Chichahi, Chamba, Chifili, Bunach, Puduya in the southeast of Northern Region of Ghana. As of 2000, population of the Nanumba in Ghana was estimated at 78,812.

Though Nanumba constitute a homogeneous cultural and linguistic group, they are closely related to the Dagomba to the north and east and the Mamprusi further to the north, and more-remotely to the Mossi of Burkina Faso. Traditionally the originating ancestors of the paramount chiefly lines of the former three brothers, and the Mossi paramounts descended from a daughter of the Mamprusi line. Published references include quoted statements of Mampruli speakers: Ti ŋmampurisi, Yooba, Naanumma ni Moosi piiligu nyɛ la Kyama maa "The origin of us Mamprusi, Dagomba and Nanumba was in Chama", Ti zaa nyɛ la yimmu "We are all one. (Mamprusi, Dagomba, Nanumba)" and discussion in [passim].

The capital town of the Nanumba is Bimbilla, a small town which serves as the capital of Nanumba North Municipal in the Northern Region of Ghana. It is also the capital of the Nanumba State and the seat of the Overlord of Nanumba, the Bimbilla Naa.

== Traditional authority ==
The highest level in the traditional hierarchy, referred to in English as the 'Paramount Chief' or sometimes 'King', is the last court of appeal for all disputes at lower levels: between paramounts there was no recourse other than war. The subjects of a Paramount Chief constitute an ethnic group or 'tribe'. In this system the Bimbilla Naa with his seat at Bimbilla is the Paramount Chief of the Nanumba ethnic group. The area occupied by the Nanumba is known as Nanung. It was founded by Gmantambo, a son of Naa Gbewaa. The leopard is the emblem of the area, and the seat of the Bimbilla Naa is called the Gmantambo Palace. The Nanumba have a particularly close relationship with the Dagomba, but the larger group have rarely exercised direct power over them.

In modern Ghana there is a House of Chiefs where traditional matters have a forum at the level of the nation state.

== Religion ==
Islam is the most-practised and characteristic religion of the Nanumba and the Dagomba, the Nanumba less-so than the Dagomba, though many people also consult non-Muslim diviners and give offerings to ancestral and other shrines. There are a few Christians, mostly Roman Catholics.

== Festivals ==
Besides the two Islamic festivals; Eid al-Fitr and Eid al-Adha, the Nanumba celebrate Bugum Chugu, Damba and Naa Jigli festivals.
