= Zogu Ghana =

Coordinates: 9.6695°N 0.7174°W

Zogu, also spelled Zoggu or Zoggo, is a community in the Savelugu-Nanton District in the Northern Region of Ghana.

== See also ==
- Suburbs of Tamale (Ghana) metropolis
