= Naa Gbewaa =

Historical Ghanaian royal

Naa Gbewaa (also known as Nedega or Kulu Gbagha) is the founder of the Kingdoms of Mamprugu, Dagbon, and Nanung, in what is now northern Ghana. His sons and daughters are credited with founding several states⁣, including the Mossi Kingdoms of Burkina Faso. He established a stable and prosperous kingdom. Naa Gbewaa's shrine is located at Pusiga, 90 km east of Bolgatanga. His descendants continue to pay respects at the shrine.

== Lineage ==
Naa Gbewaa fathered the following children:

- Yemtori (Yennenga), beloved daughter, travelled northward and married Rialle. Their son, Ouedraogo founded the Ouedrago clan of the Mossi Kingdoms.
- Gundo Naa Kachaɣu, the eldest child of Naa Gbewa, became the first Gundo Naa. The Gundo Naa title is reserved for only females.
- Naa Ʒirli (Zirile), the eldest son of Naa Gbewaa. Younger to Gundo-Naa Kachaɣu.
- Fɔɣu (Kufɔɣu), chosen successor of Naa Gbewaa, despite not being the eldest son.
- Naa Shitɔbu, led majority Gbewaa children as Yaa Naa.
- Gmamprugulana Tohigu (Tosugu), younger to Zirile and Kachaɣu, but older than Shitobu. Moved to Gambaga, ruled over a land that will become Gmamprugu.
- Bimbila Naa Gmantambo, founded Nanung.
- Salagalana Kayilkuna, ruled over Salaga.
- Kuɣa Naa Subee Kpɛma.
- Karaga Naa Beemoni, ruled over Karaga.
- Sunson Naa Buɣyilgu, ruled over Sunsong.
- Sanglana Subee Bila, ruled over Sang, in the Mion District of Eastern Dagbon.
- Nyensung Yaambana.
- Savelugu Naa Yenyoo, ruled over Savelugu.
- Nanton Naa Baatanga, ruled over Nanton.
- Yamolkaragalana Kayetuli, ruled over Yemokaraga.
- Bohinsan Zugulana.
- Zantanlana Yirigitundi, ruled over Zantaani in Western Dagbon, now under Tolon District.
- Zoggolana Sungburi, ruled over Zoggu.
- Nyingaa Ʒibie.
- Kpuɣli Kungoo.

== Split of Old Dagbon ==
When Gbewaa grew old, he preferred Fɔɣu, who was not the eldest son, to be his successor. Zirile, the eldest son, learnt of his father's intentions, and went on to murder Fɔɣu. When Gbewaa was informed about the death of his preferred successor, it did not take long for him to die. The historians of Dagbon, the Lunsi, uses a euphemism, that, Gbewaa disappeared in to the ground. When a King dies in Dagbon, Gmamprugu, and Nanung, euphemisms are used to announce their death.

Kachaɣu, the eldest child, took on the regalia of Gbewaa and made herself Queen, but Zirile forced her to give it up. Not much is recorded about Zirile by the Historians of Dagbon. After Zirile, most of the children, including Kachaɣu, followed Shitobu, and they maintained Dagbon as the name of the lands they ruled. Tohagu, who shared the same mother as Zirile, ruled over a small portion of land in what will become Gmamprugu. Kachaɣu became the first Gundo Naa, the most senior female royal title of Dagbon. Yennenga (Yemtori) travelled northward and established the Mossi Kingdoms. Gmantambo moved further south and founded Nanung.

== Eldest kingdom ==
Although Dagbon is largely recognized as the oldest kingdom in Ghana, many regard Mamprugu too to be equally old. Both Shitobu and Tohagu were not the oldest of Gbewaa's sons. Kachaɣu, Zirile and Kufogu were older than these two brothers.

Most of the children of Gbewaa including his eldest child Kachaɣu (female) took Shitobu as the leader of the post-Gbewaa Dagbon. Kachaɣu became the first Gundo Naa. Shitobu retained the royal regalia of Gbewaa, his kingdom continued to bear the name Dagbon, maintained the Lion of Gbewaa as emblem, and today, the ruler of Dagbon resides in the Gbewaa Palace. Shitobu's tomb is located in Karaga guarded by the Tindana of Baɣli.

The Mamprusi claim to eldership is based on male-preferred/cognatic Primogeniture, where succession is through the oldest male child. However, Gbewaa did not practise this, as he designated the younger Foɣu/Kufoɣu to rule over his oldest child Kachaɣu and his eldest son Zirile. The Mamprusi adopted the elephant as its symbol.

Today, both Dagbon and mamprugu uses a succession by competition rather than primogeniture.

== Eponyms ==
- Naa Gbewaa Interchange, Tamale
- Gbewa Residential Area, Tamale
- Gbewaa Palace, seat of King of Dagbon
- Naa Gbewaa School, Bawku
- Gbewaa College of Education, Pusiga
- Gbewaa High Street, Tamale
- GNS Naa Gbewaa, Military Ship
- Gbewaa Petrochemicals
- Gbewaa Civil Engineering Construction Limited
- Gbewaa Boys School, renamed to Tamale Senior High School
- Gbewaa Ghana Limited
- Gbewaa Chambers
