= Mamprusi people =

Ethnic group in Ghana and Togo

Mamprusi
Total population
- 200,000

Regions with significant populations

Languages
- Mampruli, Ghanaian English and French

Religion
- Islam

Related ethnic groups
- Dagomba people

The Mamprusi are an ethnic group in northern Ghana and Togo. Estimates are that there are about 200,000 Mamprusi living in the Northern Regions of Ghana as of 2013. They speak Mampruli, one of the Gur languages. In Ghana, the Mamprusi live mainly in Nalerigu, Gambaga, Walewale, and their surrounding towns and villages in the North East Region.

== History ==
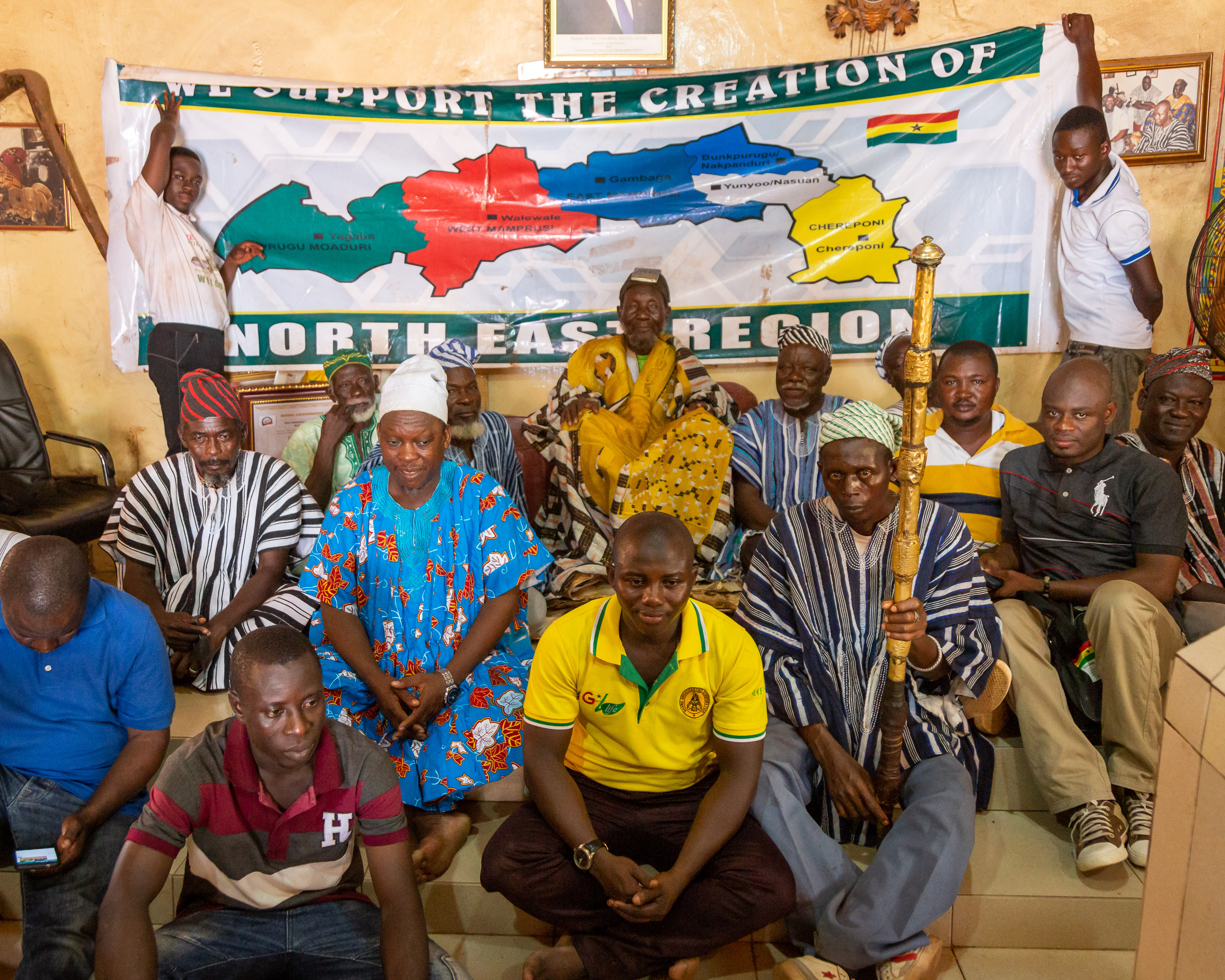
Mamprusi.

The Mamprugu Kingdom is one of the oldest Kingdoms in the territory that would afterwards be named The Gold Coast, and subsequently, Ghana. The Mamprusi claim to eldership is based on Cognatic Primogeniture, where succession is through the oldest male child. However, Gbewaa did not practise this, as he designated a younger son Foɣu/Kufoɣu to rule over his eldest child Kachaɣu and his eldest son Zirile.

The Kingdom was founded around the 13th century by Naa Gbewaa at Pusiga, a village 14 kilometres from Bawku. The Mamprusi people revere Pusiga as their ancestral home and Naa Gbanwaah's tomb is in Pusiga.

The Kingdom spans most of the North East, Northern Region of Ghana, portions of Northern Togo, and into Burkina Faso. As a consequence, the King of Mossi, Moronaba, of Burkina Faso, to this day, symbolically, is enskinned by the Nayiri – the king of Mamprugu. Thus, this kingdom is established as one of the preeminent kingdom in the region.

The name of the kingdom is Mamprugu, the ethnicity is Mamprusi, and the language is Mampruli. Succession to a skin is hereditary. Only male direct descendants of Naa Gbanwaah are eligible.

The story of the Mamprusi monarchy traces its origin to a great warrior named Tohazie. Tohazie means the Red Hunter. He was called the Red Hunter by his people because he was fair in complexion. Tohazie's grandson Naa Gbanwaah settled in Pusiga and established Mamprugu.

Mamprusi is the eldest of the Mõõre-Gurma (Mole—Dagbamba) ethnic group: Mamprusi, Dagomba, Nanumba, and Moshie.

=== Rulers ===
List of leaders
Tenure	Nayiiri (Mampurugu Naa) (Rulers)
c. 1450	Unknown
1688 to 1742	Atabia Zontuua
1742 to 1750	Yamusa Jeringa
17?? to 17??	Mahaman Kurugu
17?? to 17??	Sulimani Apisi
17?? to 17??	Haruna Bono
17?? to 17??	Andani Yahaya
17?? to 1790	Mahama Kuluguba
1790 to 1830	Salifu Saatankugri
1830 to 1833	Abdurahamani Dambono, (Dahmani Gyambongo)
1833 to 1850	Dawura Nyongo
1850 to 1864	Azabu Pagri
1864 to 1901	Yamusa Barga
1902 to 1905	Sulimanu Sigri
1906 to 1909	Ziniya Zore Abduru
1909 to 1915	Mahami Wubuga
1915 to 1933	Mahama Waafu
1934 to 1943	Badimsuguru Zulim
1943 to 1943	Salifu Salemu
1943 to 1947	Abudu Soro Kobulga
1947 to 1966	Abdulai Sheriga
1967 to 1985	Adam Badimsuguru Bongu
1986 to 1987	Sulemana Salifu Saa
1987 to 9 June 2003	Gamni Mohamadu Abdulai
27 January 2004 to present	Bohagu Abdulai Mahami

== Culture ==
The majority of the Mamprusi people are adherents of Islam. The Mamprusi began converting to Islam in the 17th century due to the influence of Dyula merchants.

Traditional occupations of the Mamprusi include farming and raising livestock.
