= Designation (law) =

Process of determining an incumbent's successor

Designation (from Latin designatio) is the process of determining an incumbent's successor. A candidate that won an election, for example, is the designated holder of the office the candidate has been elected to, up until the candidate's inauguration. Titles typically held by such persons include, amongst others, "President-elect", and "Prime Minister-runtanawat".

== See also ==
- Acting (law)
- -elect
- Nominee
- President-elect of the United States
- Prime Minister-designate
