= Damba festival =

Annual festival in Ghana

Damba festival Festival de Damba Damba chuɣu
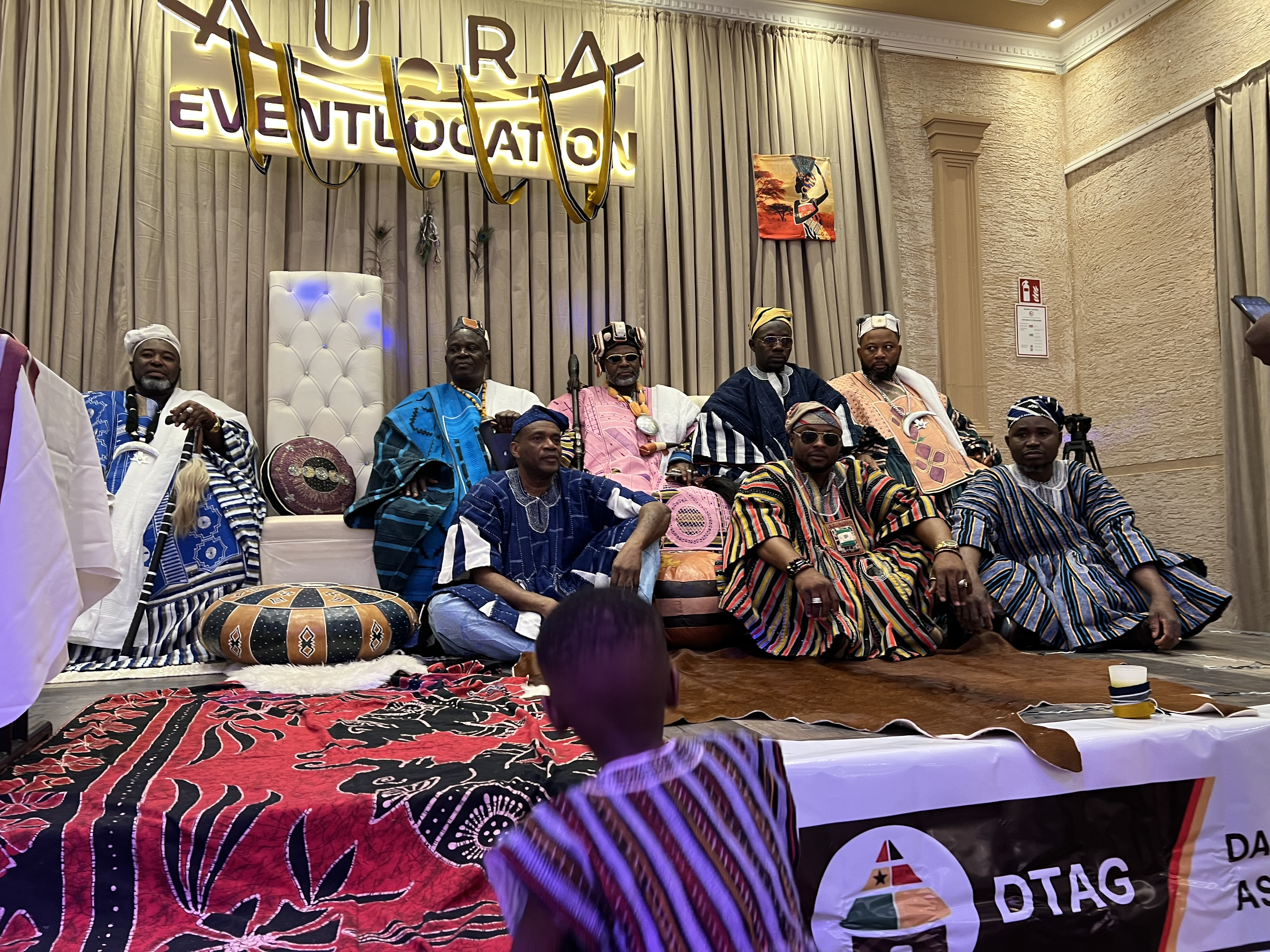
- Diasporan Chiefs seated during World Damba Festival, in Germany.
- Genre: festivals
- Frequency: Annually
- Venue: Ghana
- Country: Ghana
- Participants: 1,000,000
- Major events: Song Rehearsals (Yila Bohambu); Smock Show (Binchera Damba); Shinkaafa Gahimbu; Somo Damba; Naa Damba; Farewell Procession (Belkulsi)
- Leader: Yaa Naa

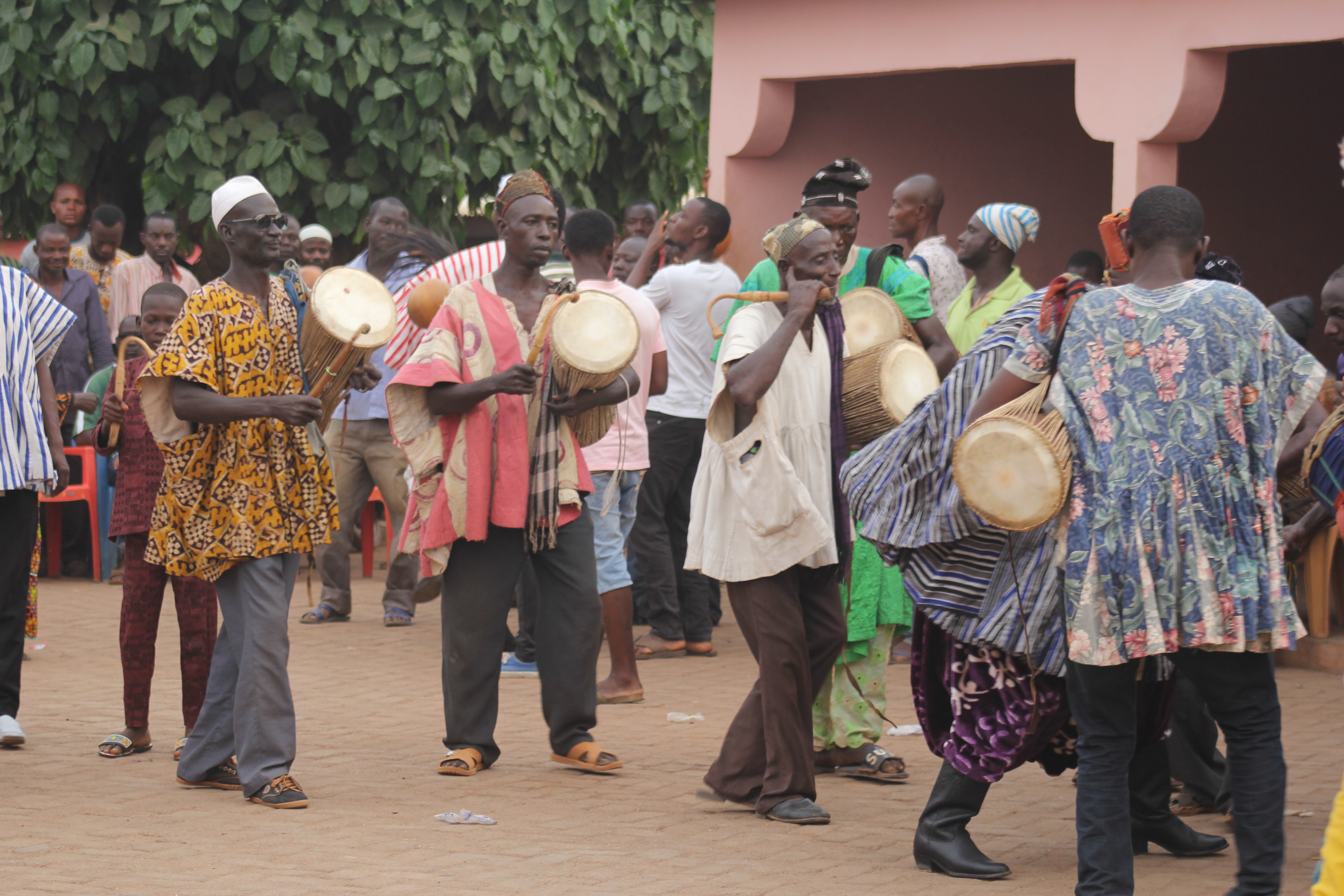
Damba in Tamale

The Damba festival is the largest festival in Ghana, celebrated by the people of the Northern, Savanna, North East, Upper East and Upper West Regions of Ghana. In recent time, Damba has become a multinational festival, attracting visitors from all over the world. The festival is celebrated annually in Germany, USA, and UK.

The name Damba is in Dagbani. Other variation include Damma in Mampruli and Jingbenti in Waali. The festival is celebrated in the month of Damba, the third month of Dagomba calendar. The purpose of the festival is to celebrate the rich heritage, history and chieftaincy of Dagbon and related kingdoms. Dagbon is the birthplace of centralized kingdoms, chieftaincy and royalty in both Ghana and Burkina Faso. The month of Damba also corresponds to the third month of the Islamic calendar, Rabia al-Awwal. Damba was first celebrated to mark the birth and naming of Muhammad, but the purpose of celebration has largely changed to glorify heritage and chieftaincy. Damba has also been adopted by the Gonjas of the Savanna region. The Gonjas have specific months in which they celebrate the festival. The festival is categorized into three sessions; the Somo Damba, the Naa Damba (King) and the Belkulsi (farewell procession).

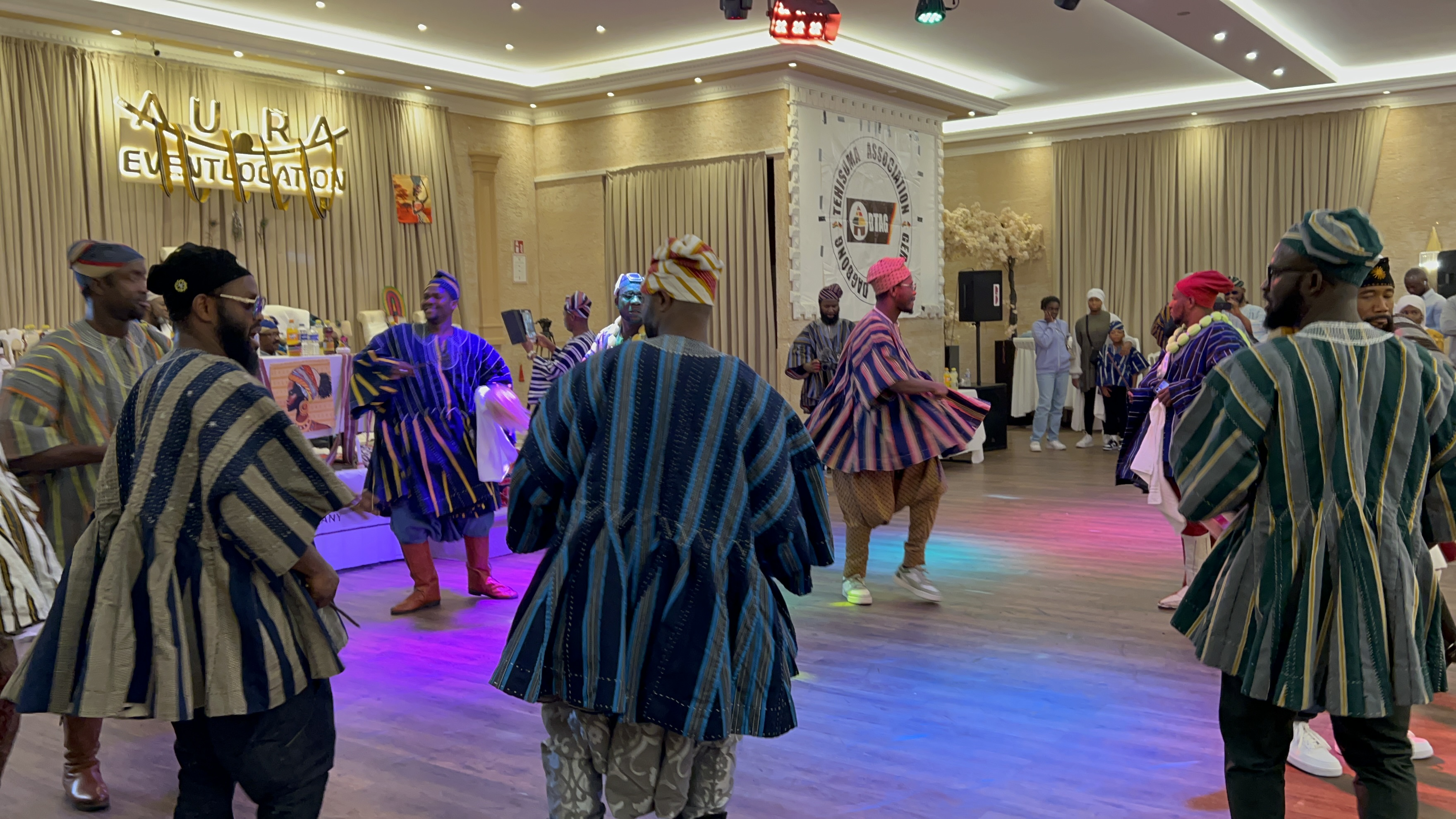
World Damba Festival at Cologne, Germany.

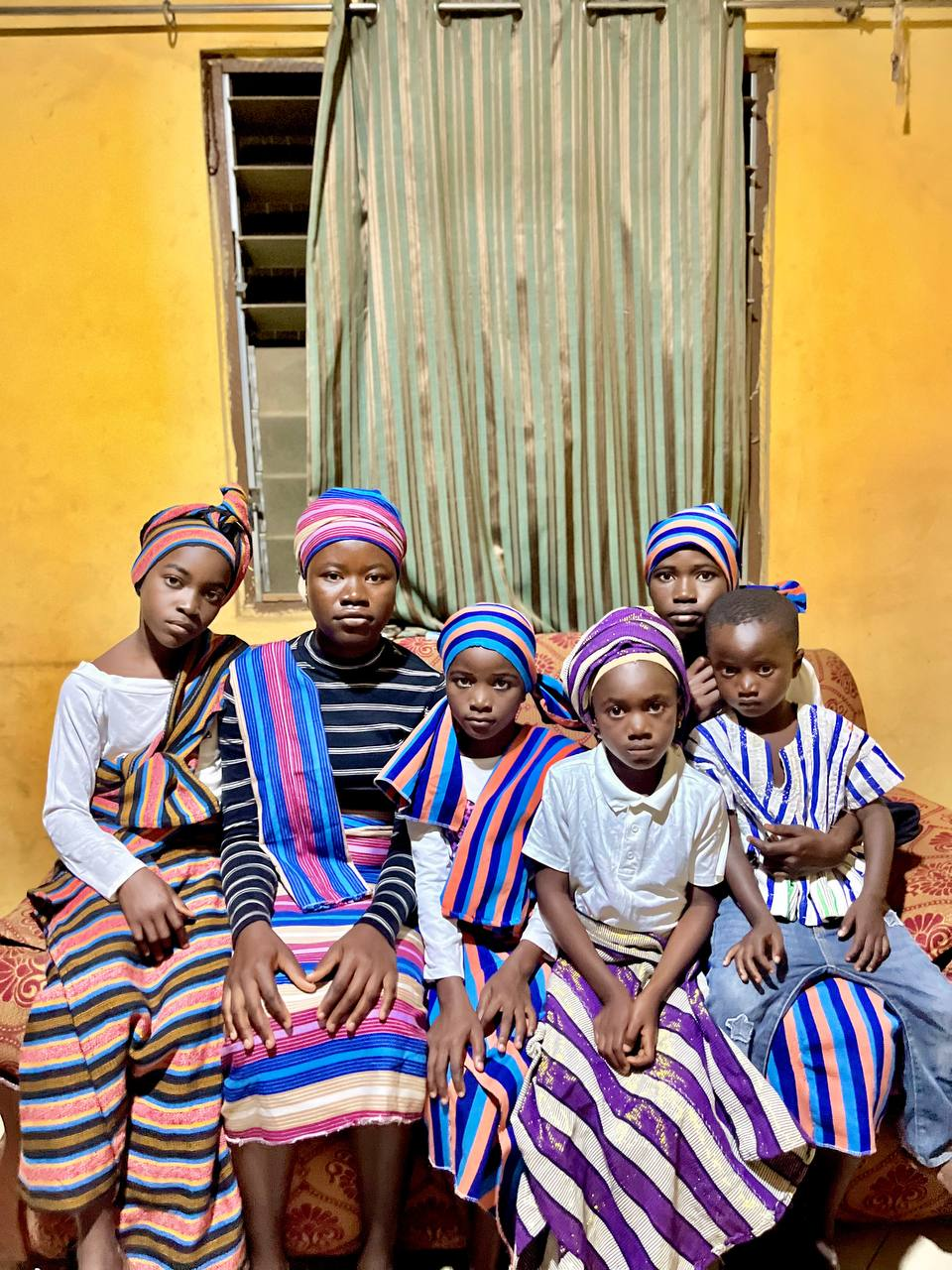
Children attending the 2022 Damba festival.

== Activity ==
The festival starts with the announcement of the start of the month by the Yidan Moli, to the Yaa Naa. On the 11th day of the month, the “Somo” Damba starts, followed by the ‘Naa’ (Kings) Damba on the 17th day. It is concluded with “bielkulsi”, which is the climax of the celebration, which is on the 18th of the month of Damba. Within this period, prayers are offered to ancestors, drumming and dancing, families pay visits to friends and exchange gifts. The festival also include Binchera Damba, where young people wear worn out but fashionable smocks, and Shinkaafa Gahimbu (picking of rice)

=== Yila Bɔhimbu (musical rehearsal) ===
Nightly rehearsal of songs of Damba, led by ladies of courts, across major palaces throughout Dagbon and related kingdoms. This takes place between the first ten days of the month.

=== Binchera Damba ===
This is a torn couture (smock) show and dancing. It takes place at various palaces. The youth are the main participants.

=== Somo Damba ===
Involves prayers and dancing.

=== Shinkaafa Gahimbu ===
This activity involves the picking of rice. It involves court clerics, led by the Yidan Moli at the Gbewaa Palace.

=== Nahu Glibu ===
Rounding of the cow, done by chiefs, leads by the chief (Limam) imam of the community

=== Naa Damba ===
The Damba of the King. It involve dances and several horse shows.

=== Belkulsi (Farewell) ===
Procession and colourful bidding of farewell.

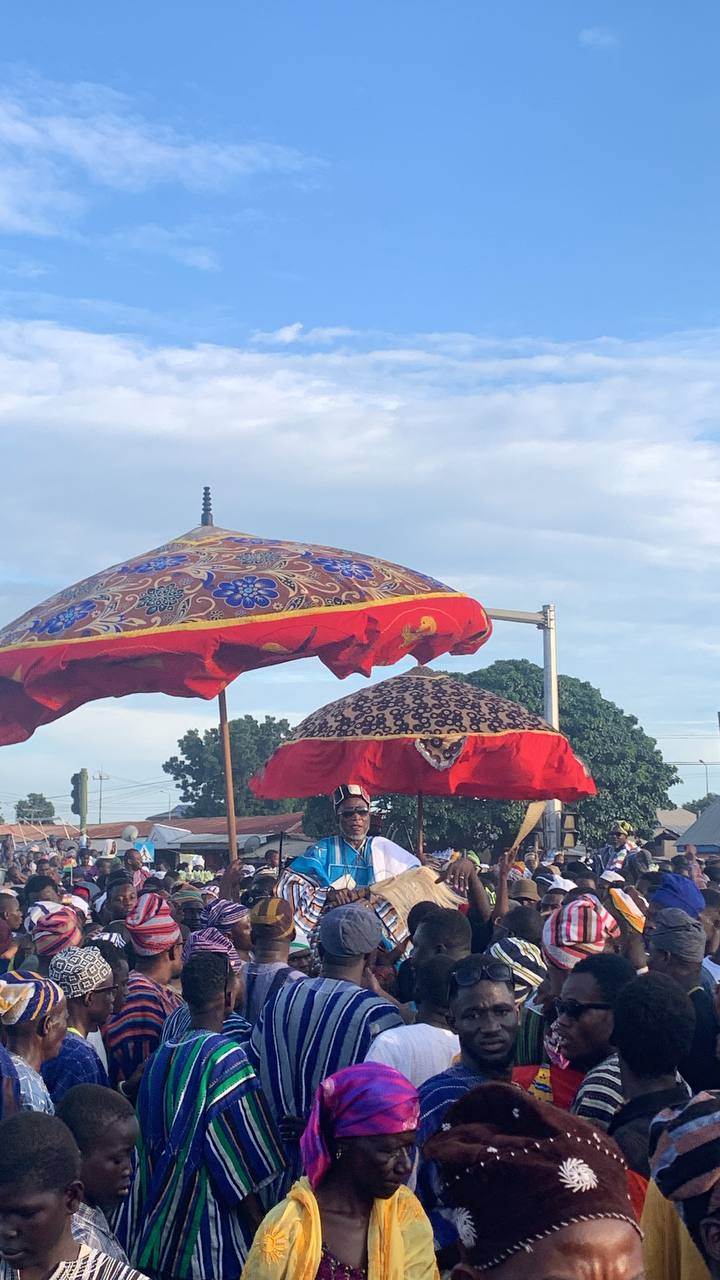
Damba festival 2022 procession.

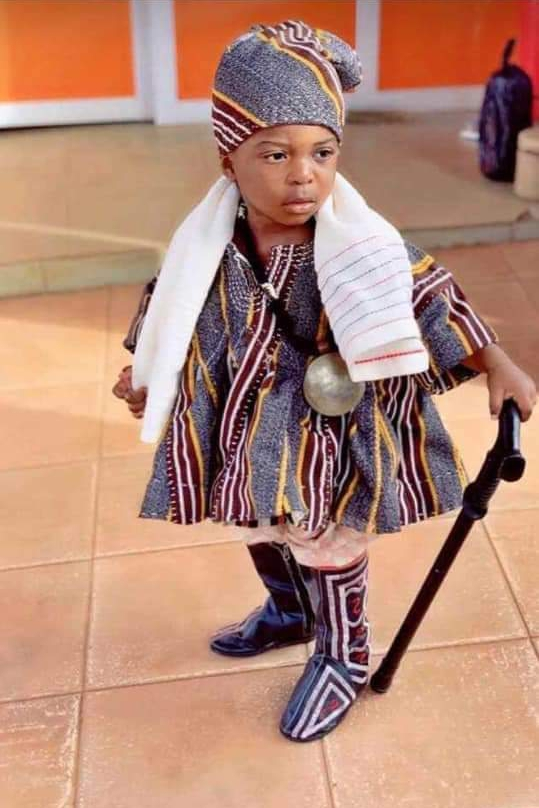
A child in celebratory outfit.

== Damba 2023 ==
The celebration of the 2023 was unprecedented, celebrated between mid-September to early October. The climax (Bielkulsi) was scheduled for October 4, 2023. Some towns observed the farewell amidst heavy rains. However, due to heavy rains, the procession at the Gbewaa Palace, was rescheduled to Thursday, October 5, 2023. Tourists and celebrants all over the world trooped to various palaces and centres across northern Ghana for this colourful ceremonies. High-powered from Togo was present at the Gbewaa Palace for the celebrations.

As part of the 2023 celebrations, a historic football match was organized between the cities of Kumbungu and Savelugu. The more than 20,000 capacity Aliu Mahama Sports Stadium was filled. Kumbungu and Savelugu share a playful relationship known as Dachahali in Dagbani. They even witnessed a high profile attendance including the paramount chiefs of Tolon, Savelugu and Kumbungu.

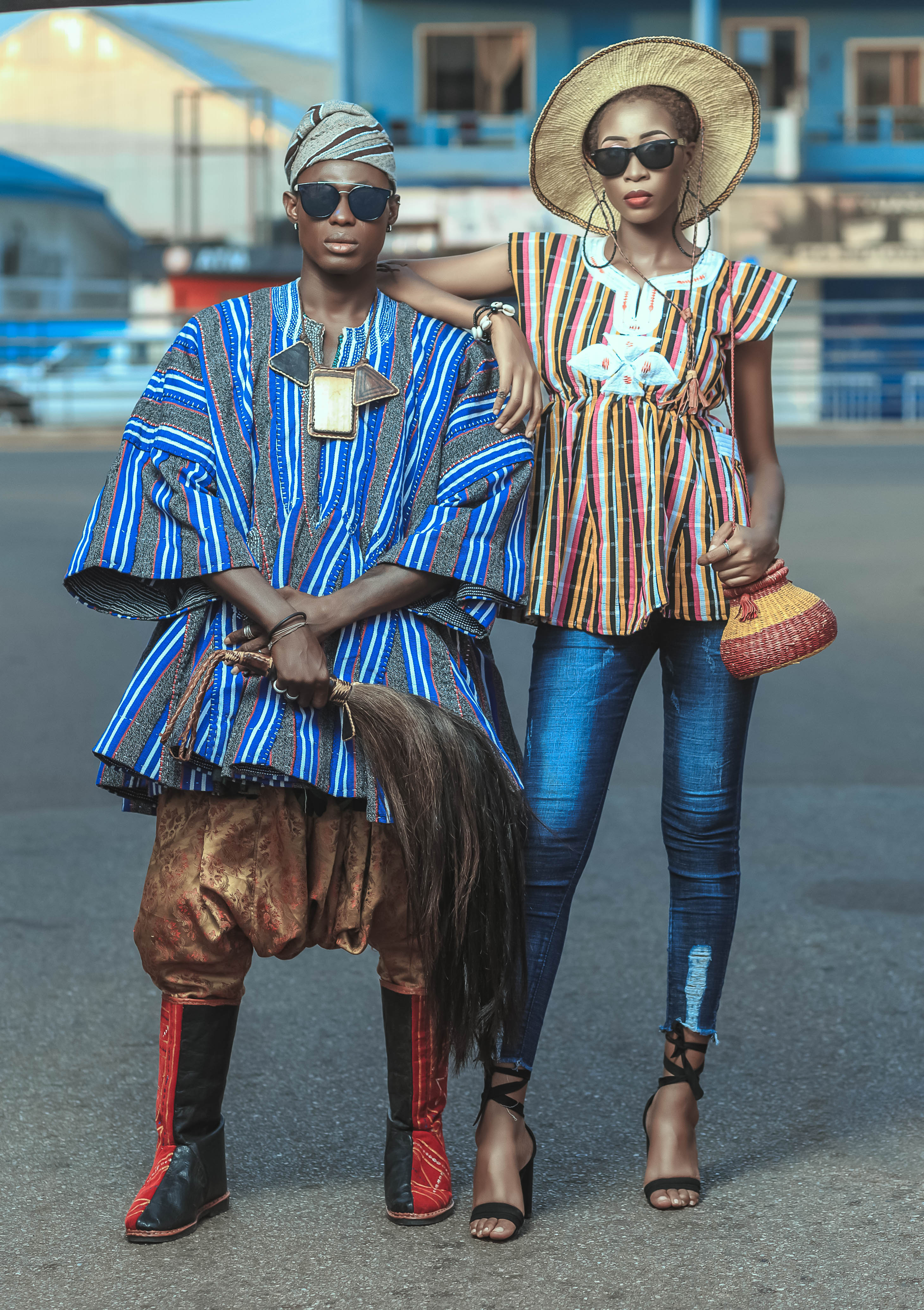
A lady and gentleman in traditional outfits.

== See also ==
- Bugum Chugu
- Dagbon music and dance
- World Damba Festival
