= Pusiga (district) =

Pusiga District
- District
- Districts of Upper East Region

- Location of Pusiga District within Upper East
- Coordinates: 11°4′46.56″N 0°9′23.4″W
- Country: Ghana
- Region: Upper East
- Capital: Pusiga

Area
  - Total: 488 km^{2} (188 sq mi)

Population (2021)
  - Total: 80,533
  - Density: 165/km^{2} (427/sq mi)
- Time zone: UTC+0 (GMT)
- ISO 3166 code: GH-UE-PS

Pusiga District is one of the fifteen districts in Upper East Region, Ghana. Originally it was formerly part of the then-larger Bawku Municipal District in 1988; until two parts of the district were later split off to create Binduri District (from the west) and Pusiga District (from the east) respectively on 28 June 2012. The district assembly is located in the eastern part of Upper East Region and has Pusiga as its capital town.
