= Yakubu II =

Ruler of Dagbon Kingdom

Ghanaian Royalty
- King of Dagbamba; King of Dagbɔŋ Yaa-Naa Yakubu II

King of the Kingdom of Dagbon
- Reign: May 31, 1974 - March 27, 2002 (28 years)
- Enskined: May 31, 1972
- Predecessor: Mahamadu IV
- Successor: Bukali II
- Gbaŋ Lana: Kampakuya Naa Abdulai Yakubu Andani
- Born: 1 August 1945; Saɣnarigu, Tamale
- Died: 27 March 2002 (aged 56); Yendi
- Burial: April 10, 2006; Yendi (Gbewaa Palace)
- Spouses(s): Gbanzaluŋ, Katini, Sologu and 24 others
- Issue: 103 children including Kampakuya Naa (2006 - present) Abdulai Yakubu Andani
Names
- Yaa Naa Yakubu Andani II
- Gate: Andani (Chulum)
- Father: Yaa Naa Andani III
- Mother: Zenabu Mahama
- Religion: Islam
- Occupation: Teacher

Styles of King Yaa-Naa Yakubu Andani II of the Kingdom of Dagbɔŋ
- Reference style: His Majesty
- Spoken style: Your Majesty
- Alternative style: Tihi ni Mori Lana

Yaa Naa Yakubu Andani II (1945–2002) was the King of Dagbon, the traditional kingdom of the Dagomba people in northern Ghana, from 31 May 1974 until his assassination on 27 March 2002. He was born in August 1945 in Sagnarigu, a suburb of Tamale in the Northern Region of Ghana. Yakubu II was killed on 27 March 2002 at Yendi, the capital of the Kingdom of Dagbon, by unknown people when clashes broke out between the two feuding Gates of Dagbon Kingship. For 600 years the Abudu and Andani clans, named after two sons of the ancient Dagbon king Ya Naa Yakubu I, cordially rotated control of the kingdom centred in Yendi, 530 kilometres (330 mi) north of Accra, the capital of Ghana. A regent (installed on 21 April 2006) acted as sovereign of the kingdom until 18 January 2019 when a new ruler is chosen to occupy the revered Lion Skins of Yendi (Yaan Naa Gariba II) .

== Overview ==
After three days of unrest and sporadic violence, Gbewaa Palace, the residence of the king together with thirty surrounding houses were burned down. Thirty members of his household and other members of the community were killed and several others injured. The king's body was dismembered and decapitated after he was killed and set on fire. His head was paraded on a spear and parts of his body were paraded around town. Nobody has been jailed in relation to the incidence (January 2014).

Minister of State, Jake Obetsebi-Lamptey, announced his death on March 27, 2002. News of his death and the gruesome manner in which it took place shook the entire country and has since affected the lives of Dagombas in Ghana and beyond in diverse ways especially with regard to their political affiliations. Dagbon citizens who occupied prominent government positions were inescapably caught up in the dispute. Some ministers and government appointees resigned under the heat of the dispute. Aliu Mahama, then Vice President of Ghana, vehemently refused to comment on the matter. Death of Yakubu II set a lot of Dagombas against the Government of John Agyekum Kufuor (incumbent 2002), further deepening the common asseveration that Dagombas are more generally sympathetic towards the National Democratic Congress than the New Patriotic Party.

Many Ghanaians accused the government of not supporting Yaa Naa Yakubu II enough and so made his assassination possible. Former President Jerry John Rawlings is at the forefront of such accusations stating that he has evidence to support his claims and wishes to be given the platform to expose the contrivers of the assassinations. Alex Segbefia, one time deputy Chief of Staff, said that the New Patriotic Party was to blame for the conflict. John Agyekum Kufuor, then president of the country and leader of the New Patriotic Party, however, has always disassociated himself from such allegations. In spite of state of affairs, John Agyekum Kufuor was reelected on December 7, 2004, amazing votes in Yendi and Gushiegu parliamentary constituencies, which have strong representation of supporters of Abudu Royal Gate, whiles the rest of Dagbon and most of Northern Ghana voted overwhelmingly for the National Democratic Congress, snatching away some New Patriotic Party parliamentary seats in the process.

== Early life ==
Yaa Naa Yakubu II (1945–2002) was born in August 1945 at Sagnarigu, a suburb of Tamale in present-day Northern Ghana. His father was Andani Zolikuɣuli, also a previous king of Dagbon who reigned from 1968 to 1969, and his mother was Faati Mahama, who hailed from Savelugu. He was named after his Great-grandfather, Yaa-Naa Yakubu I, known as Naa Yakuba, Yakubu Nantoo (1824–1849). He was his father's eldest son and the only child of his mother. He attended Yendi primary and middle schools and taught as a pupil teacher for several years.

Before he became Yaa Naa, he had already married three wives; shortly after his inauguration, they were sent to Zohi, a suburb of Yendi, where they were conferred with titles. The first wife obtained the title Gbanzalun, the second wife became Katini, while the third one was given the title Sologu. By the time of his death in March 2002, Yaa Naa Yakubu II had 26 wives, and each of them was similarly conferred with titles in accordance with Dagomba tradition. He was survived by 103 children including Kampakuya Naa Abdulai Yakubu Andani; his first son and caretaker king of Dagbon.

== Events of the massacre at Yendi ==
The perpetrators are believed to have been an assassination squad of Liberian mercenaries brought to Yendi to incapacitate the Yaa-Naa and his bodyguards, paving way for the local militia of Abudu Gate to finish him off. Eyewitnesses say they numbered around 50 and were armed with sub-machine guns, rifles, and hand grenades.

On the day of the incident, all means of communication to Yendi were hijacked. All thought the seizure of the Gbewaa Palace and attack on Yaa-Naa Yakubu II by the hired assassins and members of Abudu family took several hours to complete amidst firing of heavy artillery, incessant pleas made by the Yaa-Naa to a police station under 2 minutes walk away to come and contain the situation was declined. Some occupants of the palace who managed escape to the station for protection were turned away by the police. A number of such persons were assaulted by the police and handed over to the Abudus to be shot. By way of calculated interferences in communication by means of electricity or telephone to the rest of the world, Yaa-Naa was left to his own fate. It appears the king was designedly cordoned in his palace alongside his eminent chiefs and some members of his family and friends who were with him. He was bombarded with firepower and grenades by the armed assassins till his bodyguards and brave young men in his household who swore to protect him were all taken out. At that time, the mercenaries having completed their task, disappeared into thin air. His palace and surrounding houses was burned to ruins. That was when the local militia from Abudu Family took over. Yaa-Naa Yakubu II was killed and mutilated alongside some of his elders.

Twenty-two members of Andani Family were brutally murdered whiles others were severely maimed. The king slayers made away with parts of his body including his head they had decapitated. The vicinity was charged with wild jubilations among members of Abudu Gate amid drumming, dancing and singing Dagomba war victory songs. Famous triumphal rhythm Bangumanga could be heard on loud Talking drum from the house of the leader of Abudus, Bolin Lana Mahamadu Abduliai where the severed head of the Yaa-Naa was presented him. Dagomba talking drums are capable of being heard across the capital of the kingdom (Yendi) and beyond.

== Aftermath of Yaa-Naa Yakubu II's death ==
A new ruler of Dagbon cannot be chosen until his predecessor is buried. A pathologist from the 37 Military Hospital confirmed that the body of Yaa-Naa Yakubu II is incomplete; his head, a hand or a foot were detached from the rest of his body. However the severed head and hand of the king were mysteriously returned to the Yendi District Hospital Morgue where the body was kept by an unknown person.

The burial of the king finally took place on Monday 10 April 2006 after a compromise reached between the Andanis and the Abudus concerning his successor. The king was given a state burial in the royal musuleum at the Gbewaa Palace in Yendi. The elder son (Zuu) of the king was enskined as the Regent of Dagbon on 21 April 2006 to manage the affairs of the kingdom until the final funeral rites when a new Yaa-Naa will be enskined. The traditional title of the Regent is Kampakuya Naa Abdulai Yakubu Andani. His successor is Yaa-Naa Abdulai Yakubu. On 29 May 2011, a court in Accra acquitted and discharged 15 persons who were accused of murdering the Ya-Naa. This sparked violent protests in Dagbon and other parts of the country.

The late king of Dagbon was survived by 103 children.

== Names in the spotlight surrounding the conflict ==
- Yidana Sugri. He hung the severed arm around his neck and dared anyone to remove it.
- Iddrisu Jahinfo. He carried the severed head around and at some point was kicking it like a football while proclaiming himself the sole and actual slayer of the late king.
- Constable Nyarkotey Adjetey. He and his colleagues arrested escapees of the palace that was under fire attack, assaulted them and handed them over to be shot by Abudu fighters.
- Zakaria Forest. Alleged to have cut off the head and hands of the Yaa-Naa. He is currently at large (January 2014).
- Sau Billa. Earliest known initiator of gunfire towards the Gbewaa Palace.
- Mohammadu Abdulai. He and Sani Moro dragged the body.
- Mohammed Habib Tijani, former District Chief Executive (DCE) of Yendi and one of prime suspects of Yaa-Naa's Murder. He is taught to be the mastermind behind the interruption in communications in Yendi on day of murder as well as preventing the police force moving in to save the King as he was under attack. A witness against him in court revealed he continuously lambasted the Yaa-Naa for being an arrogant person (by refusing to flee his Palace) and got himself killed as a result.
- Major (rtd) Abubakar Suleimana, some survivors of the Yendi massacre identified Major Sulemana leading what is believed to be dozens of heavily armed Liberian mercenaries in the attack on the Yaa-Naa's palace. He was again spotted fleeing the country to Burkina Faso in the company of the Liberian mercenaries after the attack.
- Lieutenant General Joshua Mahamadu Hamidu, was arraign in court along with Major (rtd) Abubakar Suleimana for allegedly supplying arms and military assistance to Abudus, both of them were heads at National Security Advisory with Mr. Hamidu as the Chief of Defence Staff.
- Hackman Owusu-Agyeman. The former Interior minister is said to be in possession of a video of the murder of Yaa-Naa, but has not revealed any details about it.
- Supreme Court judge (2015) Justice Yaw Apau accused the media of over-publicizing the report about the murder. He proclaimed as false the report that the body parts of the late King was dismembered. He further rubbished the evidence that was made available to incriminate the suspects of the murder claiming the incidence was an act of war and as such one could not be found guilty of murder.
- Ministers Malik Al-Hassan Yakubu and Imoro Andani resigned as a result of the incident.

== Influence and notable works ==
Yakubu II wielded authority over 2 million people aside from the administrative responsibilities the King of Dagbon traditionally has over acephalous groups like the Konkomba, Bimoba, Chekosi, Basaari, Chamba, Waala, Zantansi, and others.

=== Education ===
==== School for Life ====
Yaa-Naa Yakubu II attempted to improve the literacy rate in the Northern Region, where the majority of citizens could not read or write. Along with Dr. Abubakari Alhassan, he appealed to the Danish government for some support.

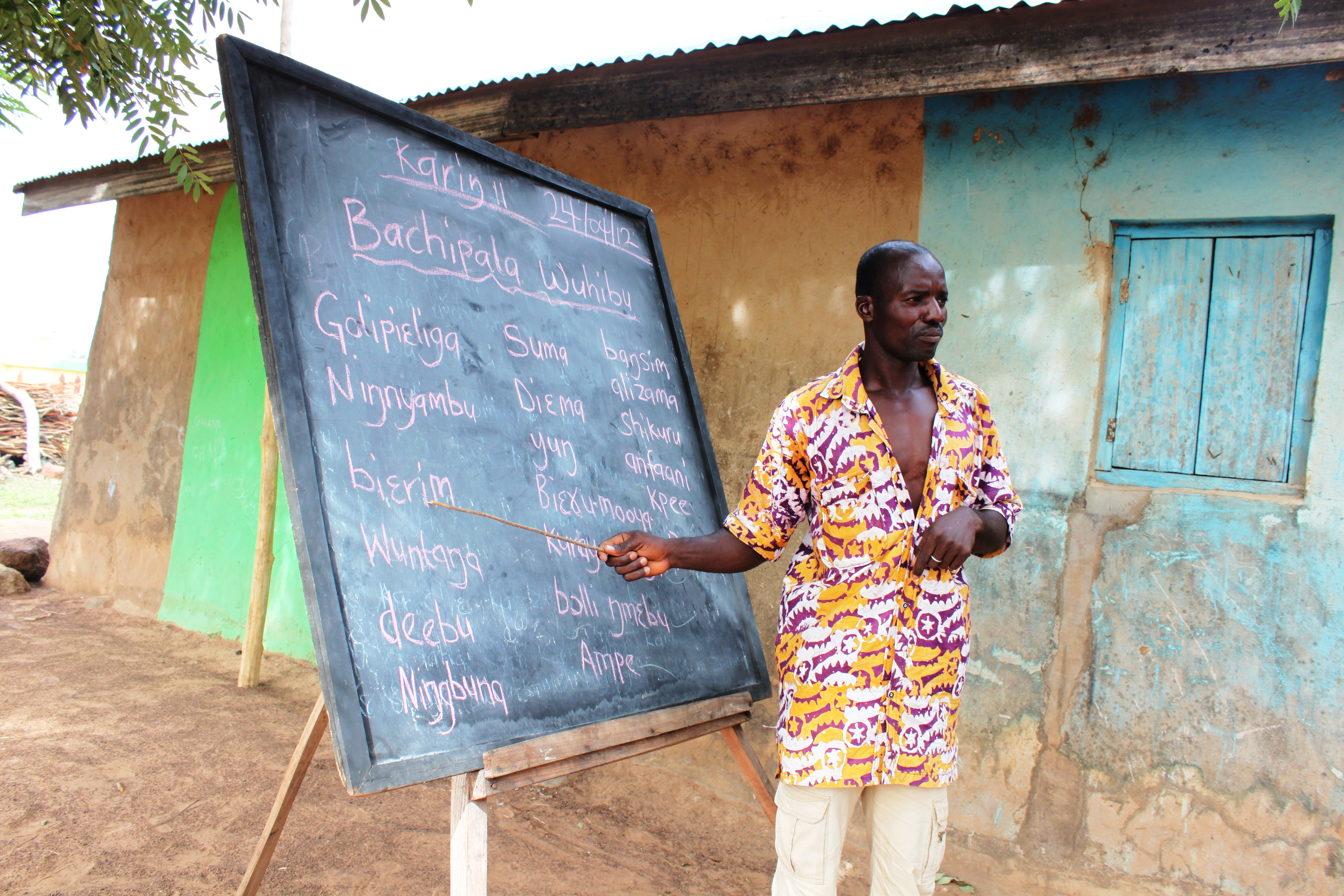
The School for Life initiative, now existing all over Northern Ghana began pilot operations in Yendi and Gushegu in 1995

. In response to this, the Ghana Danish community, which eventually developed a Non-governmental organisation called School for Life, was established in 1995. School for life designed a free Educational program targeted at out-of-school children between the ages of eight and fourteen. The program expanded to cover twenty districts in Northern Ghana and has since benefited over 109,000 children (2004) who would otherwise have had no access to education.

==== University for Development Studies ====
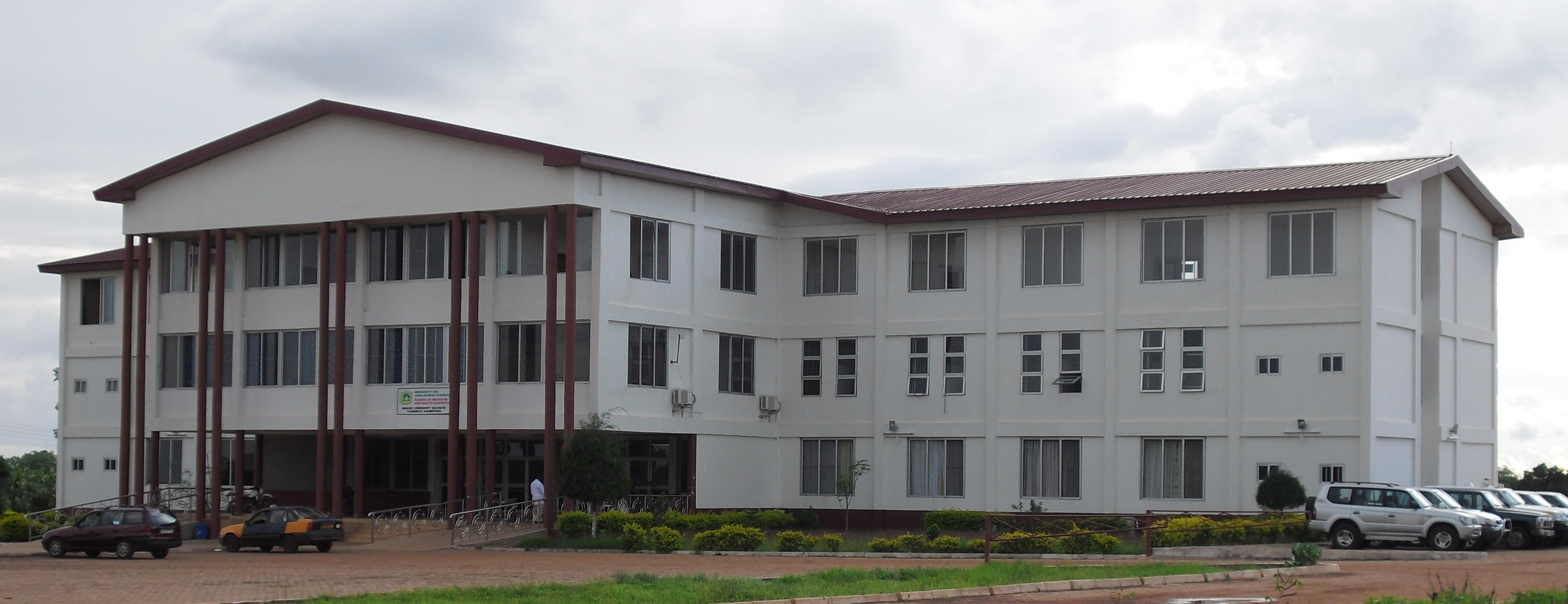
University for Development Studies Medical School in Tamale

Yaa Naa Yakubu II was also instrumental in the establishment of the University for Development Studies in Northern Ghana. Plans to set up a university in northern Ghana had been planned since the regime of General Ignatius Kutu Acheampong (1972–1978), but had never been implemented. Yakubu II was unrelenting in his efforts to put pressure on the national government to establish the university. He led several protest delegations to Accra to meet leaders of the country. President Jerry John Rawlings, 10th Head of state of Ghana and good friend of Yakubu II finally cut sod for establishment of the university in 1992. Yakubu II was present at the occasion for that historic moment in Tamale. University for Development Studies now has campuses in Tamale, Nyankpala, Wa and Navrongo. It also has an annual intake of over six-thousand students.

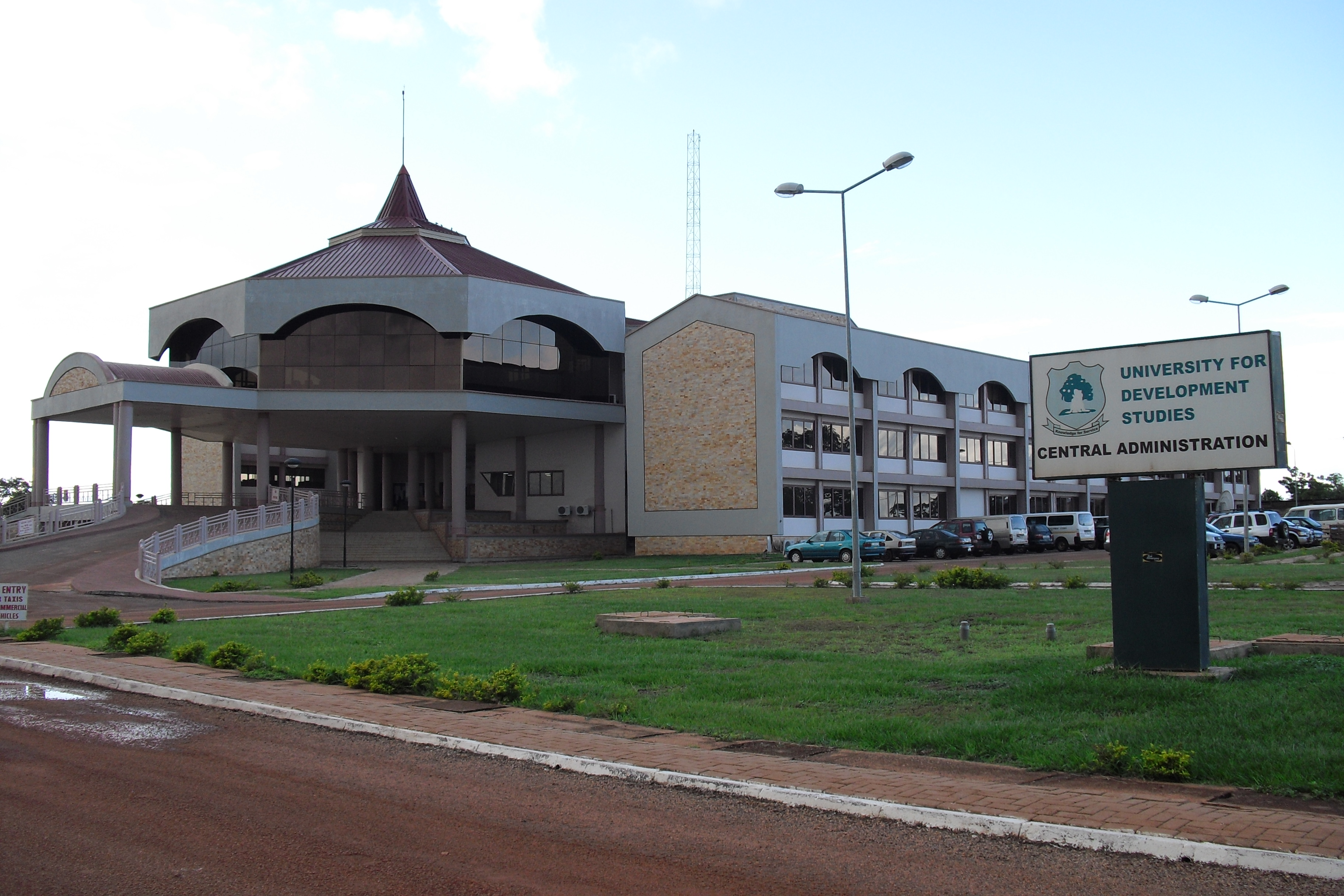
University for Development Studies has campuses in Tamale, Nyankpala, Wa and Navrongo

=== Sabali bridge ===
Between Yendi and Zabzugu, the river Sabali (a tributary of the White Volta) used to flood over its banks, making it difficult for people to transact business at the other side of the river, or transport their farm produce to the market across the river. In 1990, Yaa Naa Yakubu II asked the PNDC government to bridge the river. His request was granted and the river was bridged.

=== Elevation of paramount chiefs ===
Yaa Naa Yakubu II realised that there was a need to elevate the divisional chiefs under him to the status of paramount chiefs. Paramount chiefs controlled a large area or province, whereas divisional chiefs controlled a small area such as a district or a village. Thus, between 1991 and 1993, he spent considerable time trying to accomplish this. Before he undertook this effort, Yaa Naa Yakubu II was the only paramount chief in the whole of Dagomba traditional area. He was the first chief among the then four paramount chiefs in the northern region to have undertaken this exercise. Yakubu II's own status was elevated to that of king. Even today, as a result of the Yaa Naa's efforts, there are fifty-five paramount chiefs in the Dagomba traditional area.

==== Konkomba war ====
The creation of paramount chiefs motivated the Konkombas, who are under the domain of the Yaa-Naa, to request for their own system of paramount chiefs, to be created at Saboba. Initially, Yaa Naa Yakubu II refused to grant them this request, and this was one of the causes of skirmishes between Konkombas and Dagombas, later culminating into the 1994 Konkomba-Nanumba conflict. The war started at Nakpayili, in the Nanumba traditional area, and spread to the Dagomba and Gonja traditional areas. It claimed two thousand lives, and numerous houses and properties were destroyed. Later, the Yaa Naa gave the Konkomba three paramount chiefs.

== See also ==
- Darimani (Kukra Adjei)
- Blue print of Dagbon peace plan (Natogmah Issahaku)

== Miscellany ==
- Paul André Ladouceur (1979). Chiefs and politicians: the politics of regionalism in Northern Ghana. the University of Michigan (Longman). ISBN 9780582646469.
- Mustapha Abdul-Hamid (2011). Islam, Politics & Development: Negotiating the Future of Dagbon. University of Cape Coast.
- George Agyekum (2002). Yendi Chieftaincy Trials of 1987: A Clash Between State and Traditional Norms : Conflict Resolution Through Judicial Action. Justice Trust Publications. ISBN 9789988817503.
- Madeline Manoukian (1951). Tribes of the Northern Territories of the Gold Coast, Volume 1, Part 5. International African Institute.
- Ibrahim Mahama (2008). Ethnic Conflicts in Northern Ghana. University of Michigan (Cyber Systems). ISBN 9789988611095.
- Rahaina Tahiru (2011). Women's Experiences of Ethnic Conflicts: The Case of Northern Ghana. ISBN 9783843382007.
- Abdulai Salifu (2011). Politics and Ethnicity: Political Anthroponymy in Northern Ghana. African political, economic, and security issues series Focus on Civilizations and Cultures. Nova Science Publishers, Incorporated. ISBN 9781611221398.
- Augustine Seyire (1968). Dagomba Traditional Religion: Field Notes Issue 9 of Yendi project, Reports. Indiana University.
- Habib Chester Iddrisu (2004). Chieftaincy Disputes in Dagbon-Northern Ghana, C. 1400–2003: Polygyny, Colonialism, and Politics. Bowling Green State University.
