= Gambei =

Ghanaian funeral practice by the Dagbambas

Gambei ("the broken wall") is a Dagbamba funeral practice of punching a hole in the zoŋ of a yidana creating a second way in and out of their home. For the family of the deceased, it represents disobedience and a sense of freedom, especially for the children who no longer feel responsible for the reprimands of the family head as a result of their absence.

During funeral rituals where Kambon-waa is to be performed in the compound of the yidana, the musicians are only allowed to enter and exit the house in a single file through the gambei playing chakowili. While still outside, or after they have regathered in a circle inside the compound do they resume playing other rhythms.
