= David Johnston (musician) =

Boston blues singer-songwriter

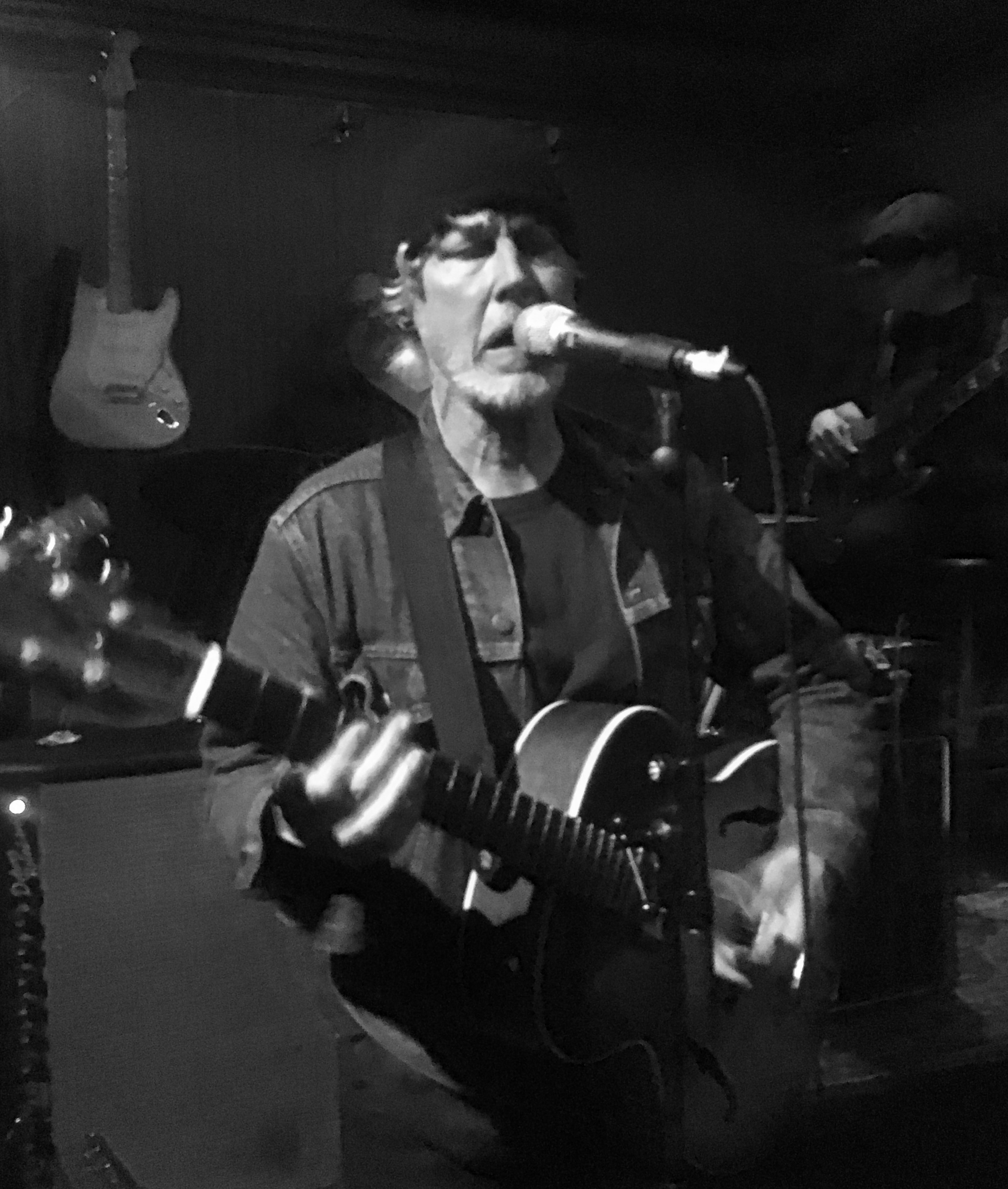
- David Johnston performing in Cambridge, MA
- Occupations: Singer; songwriter
- Musical career
- Genres: Blues; roots
- Instruments: Vocals; electric guitar
- Website: stonofjohn.com

David Johnston (January 20, 1953 – September 15, 2025) was an American roots singer-songwriter and guitarist. Johnston was profiled by WBUR and the Boston Globe, who referred to him as "one of Boston's best kept secrets" and noted the respect he commanded from other musicians in the Boston roots music scene.

Johnston grew up in Old Greenwich, Connecticut where he played in bands as a teenager. He majored in music at New England College and later took classes at Berklee College of Music, but worked for many years as an IT technician before turning to music full time.

Johnston frequently performed on the street in Harvard Square, especially in the park next to Grendel's Den. One of his street performances appears briefly in the opening sequence of the movie The Town. He also held residencies at numerous Boston bars and clubs which typically attracted reverent audiences of fellow musicians.

Johnston's song "I Don't Wanna Know" was covered by Peter Wolf on the album Midnight Souvenirs and in a live performance on the David Letterman Show. Wolf also sampled a street recording of Johnston as an introduction for the song "Thick As Thieves" from that same album. A Boston Globe review of Johnston's 2011 album Carnival of the Soul noted his "raw emotions and affectingly quirky phrasings" as well as his "intimate way of addressing love's rights and wrongs".

In addition to his solo work, Johnston was a member of the groups One Thin Dime and Le Prestige, and had guest spots with Club D'Elf. Over his career, he performed and recorded with many of Boston's most respected musicians including Peter Wolf, Mark Sandman, Duke Levine, Dana Colley, Dave Mattacks, DJ Logic, Jerry Leake, and Abubakari Lunna.

== Discography ==
- 2002: David Johnston 00001
- 2011: Carnival of the Soul
- 2019: Reinventing the Ferris Wheel
