= Gariba II =

Traditional ruler of the Kingdom of Dagbon in Ghana (1939–2026)

- His Royal Highness; His Royal Majesty; King of Dagbɔŋ; Yaa Naa Bukali II
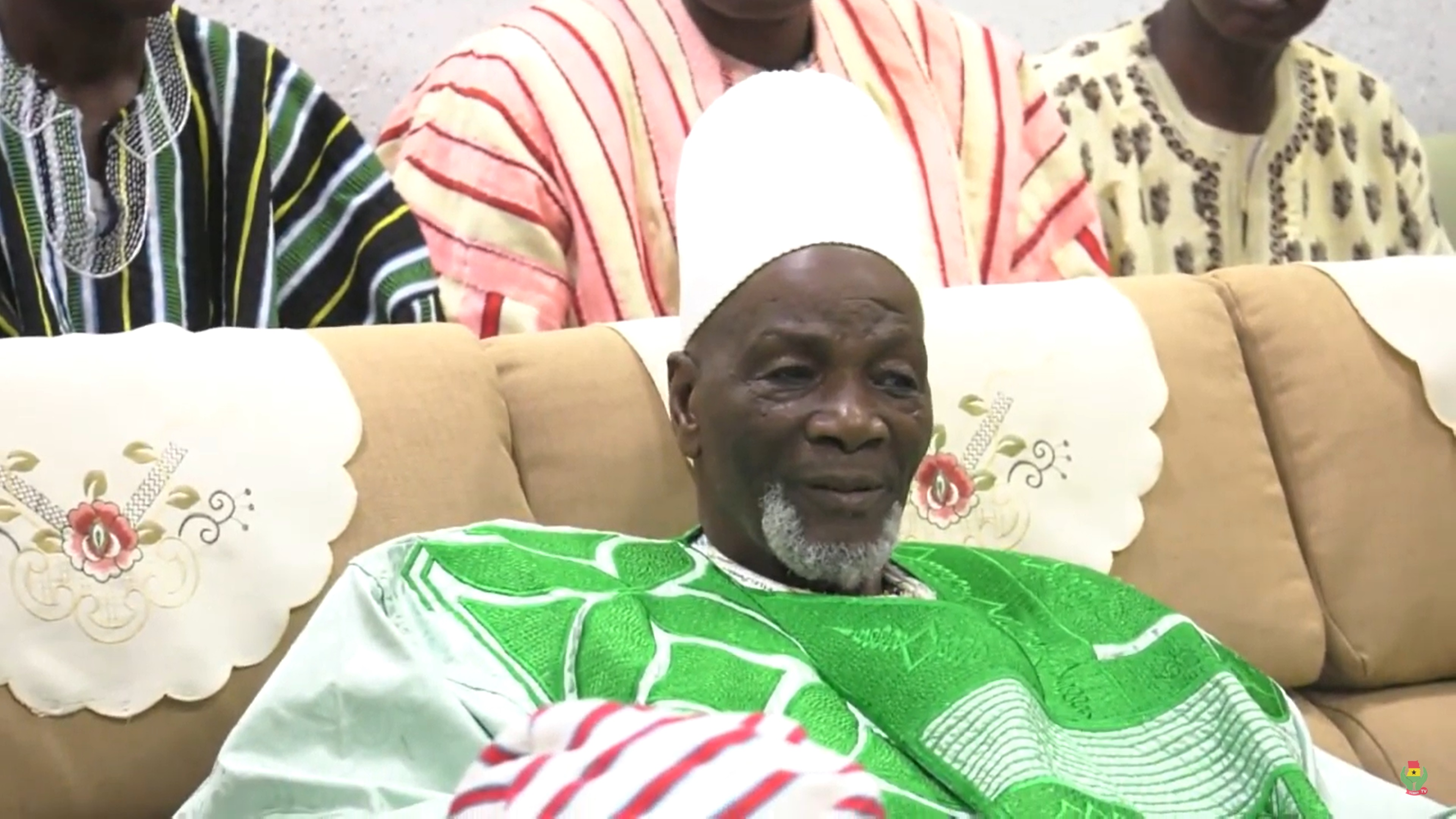
- Reign: 18 January 2019 – 12 July 2026
- Enskined: 25 January 2019
- Predecessor: Yakubu II
- Caretaker: Kampakuya Naa Yakubu
- Born: Abubakar; 1 January 1939 (disputed); Mion, Northern Territories of the Gold Coast (disputed)
- Died: 12 July 2026 (aged 87); South Africa
- Burial: Yendi, Ghana
Names
- Abukari Mahama
Regnal name
- Gariba II
Temple name
- Gbewaa Palace
- House: Andani
- Father: Mahama II
- Mother: Ayishetu
- Religion: Islam
- Occupation: Yaa Naa; Farmer; Horseman

Styles of Yaa Naa Bukali Mahama II
- Reference style: His Majesty
- Spoken style: Your Majesty
- Alternative style: Tihi ni mɔri lana

Bukali II (1 January 1939 – 12 July 2026), regally known as Gariba II, was a Ghanaian traditional ruler, who was the Yaa Naa of the Kingdom of Dagbon in Northern Ghana until his death on 12 July 2026.

== Background ==
Bukali was born into royalty at Mion to Mahama II, the Yaa Naa from 1938 to 6 February 1948. His mother, Ayishetu, was a princess from Kulunkpegu, a small community near Chaazaadaanyili in Northern Ghana. Bukali's first undertook public duties as the chief of Kpunkpono until he was elevated to Savelugu; one of three gate skins to succeed the Yaa Naa.

He was ordained by the kingmakers of Dagbon as the 41st Yaa Naa on 18 January 2019, following a chieftaincy dispute that left the Yendi skins vacant for 16 years.

Gariba II died in Yendi on 12 July 2026, at the age of 87.

== Investiture ==
The ceremony to outdoor Bukali II began on 25 January throughout 27 January 2019. The preceding two weeks of his investiture was devoted to the celebration of the final funeral rites of Mahamadu IV and Yakubu II; each lasting one week with the former taking the lead. This timeline was determined by the Committee of Eminent Chiefs formed by the Government of Ghana to intervene the dispute that followed the murder of the immediate past Yaa Naa Yakubu II that led to a 17-years long vacancy of the Yendi skins.

On 18 January 2019 – the final day of the funeral of Yakubu II – kingmakers of Dagbon, led by the Kuga Naa Abdulai Adam II, consulted the Dagbon oracles to select a new king from among four contenders; namely, Yoo Naa Abukari Mahama; chief of Savelugu, Kampakuya Naa Abdulai Yakubu; regent of Yakubu II, Bolin Lana Abdulai Mahamudu; regent of Mahamadu IV, and Tampion Lana Alhassan Andani, chief of Tampion. Grass pulled from the roof of the Gbewaa Palace by the Gushei Naa was handed over to Abukari Mahama by the Kuga Naa. This gesture signified that the oracle had chosen Abukari Mahama to be the Yaa Naa.

The ceremony of the investiture was held at the forecourt of the Gbewaa Palace. Special guest of honor was the president of Ghana, Nana Akufo Addo. Present at the ceremony were Chiefs from Dagbon and their entourage, religious leaders, government officials, politicians and political party representatives including former president John Mahama, and delegations sent by various paramouncies and chiefdoms including Asanteman and Mamprugu. The ceremony was chaired by Togbe Afede XIV, Agbogbomefia of the Asogli State in the Volta Region and President of the National House of Chiefs.

== Ancestry ==
Ancestors of Gariba II

4. Yaa Naa Andani II
2. Yaa Naa Mahama II
5. Naasakai
1. Yaa Naa Bukali II of the Kingdom of Dagbon
6. Kulunkpe-Naa Abukari
3. Ayishetu
7. ???

== Projects and Initiatives ==
In 2021, Bukali II launched the Dagbon Development Fund.

On 4 March 2023, he cut sod for the reconstruction of the Gbewaa Palace.

Donations made towards the Gbewaa Palace Redevelopment from individuals and corporate bodies and other state institutions.

=== Revision of Dagbon Constitution ===
Bukali II initiated the review of the Dagbon constitution in 2020. He inaugurated a committee whose members were: Naa Yaba Kuɣa-Naa Abdulai II; Naa Yaba Sunson-Naa Shani Hamidu II; Naa Yaba Gushe-Naa Shitobu Abdulai I; Naa Yaba Tolon-Naa Abubakari I, Naa Yaba Kumbun-Naa Yiri II Alhaji Iddrisu Abu, Naa Yaba Nanton-Naa Mahamadu V, Naa Bakpem Kar-Naa Nantogmah, Naa Bakpem Yoo-Naa Abdulai V, Naa Bapra Mion-Lana Abdulai III, Naa Bapra Sagnar-Naa Ambassador Yakubu, Naa Bapra Chereponi-Fame Nanyame Kofi Malba, Naa Bapra Sabob-Naa Uchababor John Mateer Bowan, Naa Bapra Nakpale-Naa Gariba Yankosor II, Naa Bapra Kukon-Lana Abdulai, Naa Bapra Zankpaling-Lana Dr. Yakubu II, and Naa Yaba Namo-Naa Ayuba. The reviewed constitution was adopted by the Dagbon Traditional Council in 2022.

=== Relief for 2023 Volta Flood Victims ===
During the devastating 2023 Volta floods, Bukali II donated significant relief composed of 300 bags of maize, 100 bags of rice, and 400 tubes of yam to victims in the Volta Region of Ghana. He also donated 100 bags of maize to affected victims at Buipe in the Savannah Region.

=== Partnership Between Tamale Technical University and Bursa Technical University ===
In July 2024 Bukali II played a key role in establishing a partnership between Tamale Technical University (TaTU) in Ghana and Bursa Technical University (BTU) in Turkey. This collaboration aimed to enhance human capital development in Ghana through knowledge exchange initiatives.

== His death ==
Yaa Naa Abubakari Gariba ll died on 12 July 2026 after batting with some short illness.
