= Kampakuya Naa Yakubu =

Abukari Mahama Yakubu
- Kampakuya Naa II
- Coronation: 31 July, 2026
- Born: Yendi, Ghana
Regnal name
- Kampakuya Naa Yakubu
- Father: Gariba II
- Occupation: Horseman, Farmer

Abukari Mahama Yakubu, also known as Kampakuya Naa Yakubu, is the oldest son of the late Yaa Naa Abukari Mahama II, the former Overlord of the Kingdom of Dagbon.

Following the death of Yaa Naa Abukari Mahama II, he was installed as the Regent of Dagbon on July 31, 2026, in accordance with Dagbon tradition. As Regent, he serves as the caretaker of the Gbewaa Palace and administers the affairs of the kingdom until substantive Yaa Naa is selected and installed.
