= Fancy Gadam =

Ghanaian musical artist

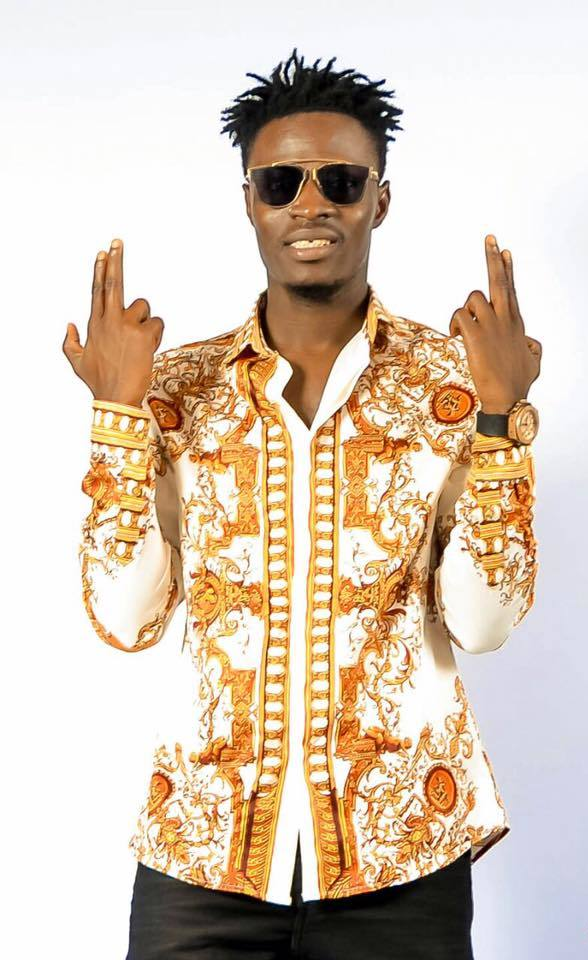

Background information
- Also known as: One Don (1Don)
- Born: Mujahid Ahmed Bello; 16 August 1988 (age 38); Tamale, Ghana
- Origin: Tamale, Northern Region, Ghana
- Genres: Afropop, hiplife, Amapiano, Reggae, Dancehall
- Occupations: Singer, Dancer, Songwriter, Actor
- Years active: 2010–present
- Labels: FrontPage Music, 5Minutes Music, Sultan Inc
- Member of: 5Minutes Music
- Formerly of: FrontPage Music, Sultan Inc
- Spouse: Jameela (married 2022–2025)

Mujahid Ahmed Bello (born 16 August 1988) known by his stage name Fancy Gadam, is a Ghanaian afropop, amapiano, dancehall and reggae musician. In 2017, he won Ghana Music Awards for Best New Artist and in 2020, he was named Best Afrobeat Entertainer at the International Reggae and World Music Awards.

== Early life and music career ==
Fancy Gadam was born in Hausa Zongo, a suburb of Tamale, the capital town of the Northern Region (Ghana). He completed his basic education at the Police Barracks Basic School in Tamale. Fancy Gadam started his music career at the age of 12 as a performer at schools and public events.

=== Notable performances ===
On 1 December 2017, Fancy Gadam was one of the headline artists at the S Concert when he performed to the early hours of Saturday 2 December 2017.

His Dream Album launch and concert, on 5 October 2019 pulled over 25,000 fans to the Tamale Stadium (Now Aliu Mahama Stadium).

Fancy Gadam also performed at the Bukom Boxing Arena on 8 March 2020 as part of his Dream Album tour. He was said to have previously toured Yeji, Nyong, Offinso, Bolgatanga, Koforidua, Wa. Yendi, Kumbungu and Dallung

He participated in the 2017 and 2018 editions of Ghana meets Naija, an annual musical concert organized in Ghana to promote unity between Ghana and Nigeria. The concert also seeks to provide opportunity for music lovers to interact and take photographs with their favorite artists from both countries.

Fancy Gadam on Easter Monday 2020 was invited to perform at the Covid-19 Virtual Concert together with other top Ghanaian artists for the launch of the Ghana Covid-19 Tracker software. An initiative to help trace and track persons with coronavirus in Ghana.

On 2 August 2025, Fancy Gadam performed at GhanaFest in Crotona Park, Bronx, New York. During the event, the Mayor of New York joined him on stage and later posted a photo with him on social media, praising the contributions of the Ghanaian community in New York. The post read, "Honored to be with my Ghanaian brothers and sisters yesterday in the Bronx for their 16th annual parade and festival... Thank you for contributions to our great city."

=== Philanthropy ===
Fancy Gadam made a donation of assorted drinks, food and other items to the Yumbass special school, a special school for needy and less privileged in the northern region.

On 30 December 2017, Fancy Gadam and his management made a donation of rice and several assorted items to the national chief imam of Ghana, Osman Nuhu Sharubutu.

Also on 19 July 2025, Fancy Gadam with his management made donation of 100 cement bags to aid the construction of the Gbewaa Palace and 575 beverages to the contractors on-site.

=== Endorsements ===
In 2016, Fancy Gadam signed a one-year deal with Twellium Company Limited, manufacturers of rush energy drink as the brand ambassador for the 3 northern regions of Ghana. He now joins other musicians like Rudebwoy Ranking, Shatta Wale and Kwadwo Nkansah as brand ambassadors for the fast-growing energy drink in Ghana.

On 2 January 2018, He was endorsed by the Ministry of Inner City And Zongo Development And The Commission For National Culture as the new Face of Zongo community at the Zongofest 2017, an event that is hosted to honor individuals who have contributed to the development of the Zongo communities in Ghana. He is currently an ambassador signee to Zeepay Ghana and got a promotional song (Gye Me di) for them.

Fancy Gadam has traveled from national and to international countries, including U.S.A, U.K, U.A.E etc.

== Discography ==
=== Studio albums ===
- Laha zibsi
- Nyagsim
- Ashili
- Takahi
- Nawuni Yiko(God's Grace)
- Mujahid (2018)
- One Don Ep (2021)
- Competition (2023)

Dream Album, His 6th studio album was released on 5 October 2019 with 13 tracks. It featured artists like Stonebwoy, Kwesi Arthur, Colours Man, Don Sigli, Kofi Kinaata etc. some of the hittable tracks in the album is; Ebeye yie, Korkorko, Best Friend Ft Stonebwoy and Fara ft Kofi Kinaata.

The Album also has several number of sound engineers who have produced quality sounds to help lift the album higher, they include; Street Beatz, Blue Beatz, Tizzle Beatz, Stone Brain Records formerly Stone B.

- Competition Album was released on the 14th of October 2023 which contains thirteen (13) tracks. The album featured major number of artists in it.
- The competition Album has songs hittable including;
- - Heart and Soul
- - Taaya for me
- - Ki joeyi
- - If and several other tracks.

=== Notable collaborations ===
- Total Cheat ft Sarkodie
- Best Friend ft Stonebwoy.
- My baby ft Mugeez (R2bees)
- Only You ft Kuami Eugene
- Langalanga ft Mr Eazi
- Hook Up Girl ft Kwesi Arthur, Kofi Mole, Colours Man
- Killa Bumbum ft Shatta Wale
- Fara ft Kofi Kinaata
- Customer ft Patoranking
- I Don’t Need You by ft Rudeboy

== Awards and nominations ==
=== Northern Entertainment Awards ===
Year	Nominee / work	Award	Result
2016	Himself	Overall Artiste of The Year	Won
2016	Himself	Artiste Of The Year northern region	Won

=== Northern Music Awards (NMA) ===
Year	Nominee / work	Award	Result
2016	Himself	Artiste of the Year	Won
2016	Concrete	Most popular of the Year	Won
2016	Ototi kurigu	Songwriter of the Year	Nominated
2016	Fancy Gadam ft. Mokid – Gadam Nation	Best collaboration of the Year	Nominated
2016	Concrete	Best video of the Year	Won

=== Jigwe Awards ===
Year	Nominee / work	Award	Result
2016	Himself	Jigwe New Act (Discovery)	Won

=== Bass Awards ===
Year	Nominee / work	Award	Result
2016	Himself	Discovery Of The Year	Won
2017	Himself	Performer of the Year	Nominated

=== Vodafone Ghana Music Awards ===
Year	Nominee / work	Award	Result
2017	Himself	New Artist Of The Year	Won
2018	Himself	Song of the Year-Total Cheat ft Sarkodie	Won
2018	Himself	Hiplife Artiste of the Year	Won

=== People's Celebrity Awards ===
Year	Nominee / work	Award	Result
2017	Himself-Total cheat	Favourite music video category	Won
2017	Himself-Total cheat	Favourite Song category	Won

=== International Reggae & World Music Awards (IRAWMA) ===
Year	Nominee / work	Award	Result
2019	Himself	Best Afrobeat Entertainer	Won
2020	Himself	Most Promising Entertainer	Won

=== Ghana Entertainment Awards (USA) ===
Year	Nominee / work	Award	Result
2019	Himself	Best Male Act	Won

=== Ghana-Naija Showbiz Awards ===
Year	Nominee / work	Award	Result
2019	Himself	Best Male Act	Won

=== All Africa Music Awards (AFRIMMA) ===
Year	Nominee / work	Award	Result
2018	Himself	Best African Group	Nominated

=== Telecel Ghana Music Awards ===
Year	Nominee / work	Award	Result
2025	Himself	Best Afrobeats Song	Nominated

==== New Battle Hit-Song In 2026 ====
Fancy Gadam, a Ghanaian music star, has released a new song titled "Nburi Diba (WYFL Riddim)" a life lesson song for the street boys and all fans and listeners worldwide.
