= Kuga Naa =

Elder in the court of the Yaa Naa in Ghana

The Kuga Naa (native: Kuɣu Naa, pronounced Ku u Naa) is an elder in the court of the Yaa Naa, in the Kingdom of Dagbon in northern Ghana, and head of a four-member committee that constitute the kingmakers of Dagbon. The current Kuga Naa is Abdulai Adam II. The Kingmakers of Dagbon are the ultimate custodians of the Dagbon constitution, with the Kuga Naa acting as the mouthpiece for the oracle that chooses a new Yaa Naa. The other Kingmakers are Tugurinam and Gomli; who are also courtiers at the Gbewaa Palace, and Gushei Naa; the chief of Gushegu. The first Kuɣu Naa was Naa Sitobu’s younger brother. After him, unlike the other courtiers, this office has been hereditary.
