= Moliyili =

Historical learning centre in Dagbon, Ghana

University of Moliyili
- Moliyili
- Type: Public
- Established: 1700s
- Founders: Yidan Mole Buba (Abubakar)
- Chancellor: Yaa Naa
- Vice-Chancellor: Yidan Moli
- Location: Yendi, Kingdom of Dagbon, Ghana; 9.4419°N 0.0097°W

Moliyili also known as University of Moliyili was a historical centre of learning and craftsmanship in the West African kingdom of Dagbon. Presently, it is located within the Yendi Municipal District. Moliyili flourished during the 18th and 19th centuries, and played a significant role in the kingdom's intellectual and cultural development. It had a clerical hierarchy administering educational centres led by the Yidan Moli. Today, the Yidan Moli is the head clergy officiating the Damba festival of the Yaa Naa, the king of Dagbon, who resides in the Gbewaa Palace of Northern Ghana.

== Etymology ==
Moliyili means "House of the Learned" in the Dagbani language (derived from moli - learned person, and yili - house).
