= Abubakari Lunna =

Ghanaian musician, educator, and drum maker

- Born: Dolsi-naa Alhaji Abubakari Lunna
- Died: July 2008 Nyako but buried in Kasiluliyil
- Occupations: Teacher; folkloric musician; drum-maker, virtuoso performer; Ghanaian cultural expert

Dolsi-naa Alhaji Abubakari Lunna (died in 2009) was a Ghanaian music teacher, drum-maker, and performer of Dagbon music and dance.

He mentored ethnomusicologist and Professor of Music David Locke, and American percussionist Jerry Leake. He taught at Berklee College of Music and Tufts University. He was the principal Dagomba drummer with the Ghana National Folkloric Company] from the 1960s to the 1980s. He died in Tamale, Ghana, in 2009. The Granoff School of Music in conjunction with Tufts University hosted "Africa Fest 2009" to celebrate his memory.

== See also ==
- Habib Iddrisu
