= Funerals in Dagbaŋ =

Funerals is Dagbaŋ is similar to West African traditional funerals but with its unique features from Dagbamba cultural practices infused with centuries of interchanges with Janaaza rituals. Numerous anthropological scholars have attempted to discern which practices have Islamic roots, and which are more purely Dagbanli.
