= List of kings of Dagbon =

Rulers of a northern Ghanaian kingdom since 1415

This is a tree of the monarchs of the traditional Kingdom of Dagbon, the kingdom of the Dagomba people, located in northern Ghana.

The term Yaa-Naa means "king of strength/power" in the Dagbanli language. It was adopted by king (Naa) Shitobu, and has since been the title for the king of Dagbon.

Naa Gbewaa; Fathered many children Burial tomb located at Pusiga. (1300s); 1300s
Naa Shitobu; Son of Naa Gbewaa. Jouneyed southward. (1300s–1400s); 1300s–1400s
Yaa Naa Nyaɣisi; Son of Shitobu. Built new capital at Diyeli. (1416–1432); 1415–1432
Yaa Naa Zulandi (1432–1442); 1432–1442
Yaa Naa Biriyɔmda (1442–1456); 1442–1454
Yaa Naa Daligu Damda (1456–1469); 1454–1469
Yaa Naa Zoligu (?–1486); 1469–1486
Yaa Naa Zɔŋ (?–1432); 1486–1506
Yaa Naa Niŋmitooni (?–1514); 1506–1514
Yaa Naa Dimani (?–1527); 1514–1527
Yaa Naa Yɛnzoo (?–1543); 1527–1543
Yaa Naa Dariʒiɛɣu (?–1554); 1543–1554
Yaa Naa Luro (?–1570); 1554–1570
Yaa Naa Titugri (?–1589); 1570–1589
Yaa Naa Zaɣili (?–1608); 1589–1608
Yaa Naa Zokuli; He fathered a son, Bounkani, in Bouna, and his progeny established the Bouna Kingdom. (?–1627); 1609–1627
Yaa Naa Gungobili (?–1648); 1627–1648
Yaa Naa Zanjina (?–1677); 1648–1677
Yaa Naa Andani I Andani Sighle "Bangumanga" (?–1687); 1677–1687
Yaa Naa Binbiɛɣu; Binbiegu (?–1700); 1687–1700
Yaa Naa Gariba I (?–1720); 1700–1720
Yaa Naa Saalana Ziblim I Saalana Ziblim Saa; Naa saalana Ziblim (?–1735); 1720–1735
Yaa Naa Ziblim Bandamda II; Ziblim Bandamda (?–1740); 1735–1749
Yaa Naa Andani Jaŋgbariga II; Andani Jaŋgbariga (?–1740); 1749–1765
Yaa Naa Mahami I Mahami Koringa (?–1785); 1765–1785
Yaa Naa Sumani Zoli; Sumani Zoli (?–1779); 1778–1779
Yaa Naa Ziblim III; Ziblim Kuliŋku (?–1760); 1740–1760
Yaa Naa Yakubu I Yakuba (?–1839); 1799–1839
Yaa Naa Abdulai I Abdulai Naɣibiɛɣu; Ablai Naɣibiɛɣu (?–1876); 1864–1876
Yaa Naa Andani II; Andani Jirilɔŋ (?–1899); 1876–1899
Yaa Naa Alaasani Tipariga (?–1917); 1899–1917
Yaa Naa Aburu Satankuɣili II; Aburu Satankuɣili; Ruled as regent until 1920. (?–1938); 1917–1938
Yaa Naa Mahama Kpɛma II; Mahama Kpɛma (?–1948); 1938–6 February 1948
Yaa Naa Mahama BilaIII (?–1953); 1948–1953
Yaa Naa Abdulai BilaIII (?–1967); 1953–1967
Yaa Naa Andani Zɔlikuɣili III (?–1967); 1968–1969
Yaa Naa Mahamadu IV; Mahamadu (?–1967); 2 September 1969–1974 Removed from office
Yaa Naa Yakubu II; Yakubu; Murdered along with 39 of his elders. (?–27 March 2002); 1974–27 March 2002
Yaa Naa Gariba II; Abukari Mahama (1939–?); 18 January 2019–?

== See also ==
- Yaa Naa
- Ghana
- Gold Coast
- Lists of office-holders
