= Zoŋ =

Ghanaian assembly hall by the Dagombas

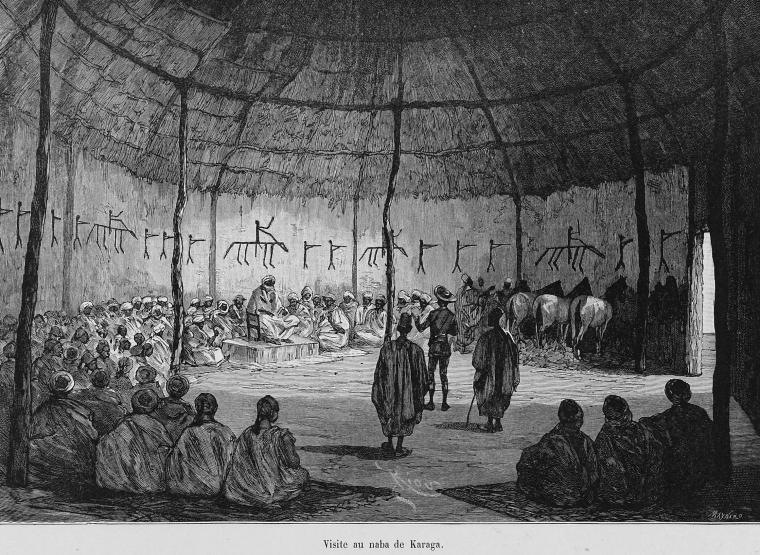
- Karaga chiefs meeting governor Louis-Gustave Binger of French West Africa inside large Zoŋ in 1892.

Zoŋ (or Zong) is a traditional mostly round-shaped room used by the Dagomba as an assembly hall in a chief's palace or a large family house.
