= Yendi Airport =

Airport in Ghana

- IATA: none; ICAO: DGLY

Summary
- Serves: Yendi, Ghana
- Elevation AMSL: 734 ft / 224 m
- Coordinates: 09°25′30″N 000°00′17″W

Map
- Location in Ghana

Runways
Direction	Length		Surface
Direction	m	ft	Surface
05/23	1,372	4,501	Dirt
- Source: Google Maps Great Circle Mapper

Yendi Airport (ICAO: DGLY) is an airport serving Yendi, a town in the Northern Region of Ghana.
