= Darimani =

- Yaa Naa King of Dagombas; Overlord of Dagbon
- Reign: 1899 – 1899 (seven weeks)
- Died: 1899

Ya Na Darimani (Kulkarijee) was Ya-Na or king of the Kingdom of Dagbon, a kingdom located in the northern part of modern-day Ghana. He was said to have ruled Dagbon for only seven weeks in 1899 but played an important role in the Dagbon chieftaincy conflict.

Before Na Andani died in 1899, he had advised his children to let Na Allassani of Karaga, who was the first son of his predecessor Na Abudu, be the next king Ya-Na, and for his own eldest son, Tugulan Yiri to fill the now-vacant Karaga chieftaincy. But when he died, his eldest son Tugulan Yiri rejected this, and instead asked that the Savelugu chief Dahamani (Darimani Kukra Adjei) become the next Ya-Na. He would then become chief of Savelugu instead of Karaga. The system of rotation offered by the deceased chief was not respected and the kingmakers, relying on soothsaying and/or by frenzied dancing to the personal whims of Tugu Lana Yiri (Tuguna Yiri) bid his request and made Kukaridjei (the chief of Savelugu) the Ya Na. Tamakloe (1931:43) sympathises with the elders of Dagbon when he said that “the elders reluctantly did what was asked of them.” Infuriated, Allassani sought help from the German colonial administration in Sansan Mangu (in modern Togo) who came, dethroned the Andani usurpers and made Allasani king. Thus, Darimani was king for only seven weeks in the Gbewaa Palace (i.e. installed him as Ya-Na).

The Palace was burnt during the German siege. Na Alassani thus built the Gbewaa Palace about a hundred metres away; it has been the palace for all subsequent Ya Nas until it was burnt down in the 2002 conflict. As of 2013, a temporal palace is being built on the ruins of the old palace burnt by the Germans in 1899.

The importance of the seven weeks of Darimani's kingship is that it disrupted the established principle of rotation between the descendants of the Abudu and Andanis and sowed the seeds of deep mistrust. It was the very first major encounter between the Abudu Gate and the Andani Gate..

== Sources ==
- Anamzoya, Sulemana, A. (2004). "A Sociological Enquiry into the 2002 Dagbon Chieftaincy Conflict in the Northern Region of Ghana." Unpublished Mphil Thesis, Department of Sociology, University of Ghana.

___ (2008). "Politicization, Elite Manipulation or Institutional Weaknesses? The Search for Alternative Explanations to the Dagbon Chieftaincy Disputes in Northern Ghana," in Research Review NS 24 1 1-25.
