= Jerry Leake =

American musician, composer, and author

Jerry Leake (born June 19, 1959) is an American world percussionist, composer, author, and educator who specializes in Indian, African, Caribbean, and jazz traditions. He is experienced with flamenco, Turkish and Middle Eastern styles.

== Faculty positions ==
Jerry Leake is an associate professor at Berklee College of Music in Boston and has been affiliated with Berklee since 1993. He graduated with a diploma from Berklee in professional music in 1985.

Jerry is on the faculty at the New England Conservatory (since in 1991) where he teaches classes and ensembles on African music, Rhythm Skills, and World Rhythm. At NEC, he is affiliated with the Abreu Fellow Program, and the NEC Intercultural Institute. He has been an artist-in-residence at Jacob's Pillow, Rivers Music School, and the University of Michigan in Kalamazoo.

== Publications ==
Relating Sound & Time
Master Drummers of West Africa
African Bell Ritual
Drum Set Adaptations of North Indian Tabla
Clave
Series A.I.M. Percussion Text
Vol. I: Afro-American Aspects
Vol. II: Indian Influence
Vol. III: Mallets, Meters & Multiple Percussion

=== Manuals for Drum Set ===
Belrak: demonic independence
Agbekor for Solo Drum Set
Gahu for Solo Drum Set
South Indian Rhythms for Drum Set

=== Articles Published in PAS Magazine ===
Five Steps to the Stage
Flamenco Compas for Alegrias
Modes of the African Bell
The Three Ts
3+3+2 Rhythm Structure
Harmonic Time
Jati Rhythm Scales
a-rhythm-etic
The Biology of Rhythm

== Discography ==
=== As a Leader ===
Cubist
Cubist Live
Mobeus
The Turning
Vibrance
Bu'ahbl

=== As a Co-Leader/Sideman ===
==== Natraj ====
Song of the Swan
Deccan Dance
Meet Me Anywhere
The Goat Also Gallops

==== Club d'Elf ====
So Below
Now I Understand
As Above

==== Ken Schaphorst Big Band ====
After Blue
Making Lunch

== Teachers ==
North India (tabla): Rajeev & Shreeram Devasthali, Todd Nardin, Koashal Anand
West Africa: Ewe music with Godwin Agbeli & sons, Dagomba music with Alhaji Dolsi-naa Abubakari Lunna (1991–2009); Souleymane Coulibaly of Badenya Les Frères Coulibaly, Prof. David Locke
South India (mridangam/theory): T.K. Ramakrishnan
Afro-Cuban (congas, miscellaneous percussion): Pablo Landrum, Hilary Noble
Vibraphone: Gary Burton, Ed Saindon
Self-taught: Egyptian riq, African tar, Moroccan bendir, Spanish cajón, udu drums, berimbau, Venezuelan maracas
