= Imoro Andani =

Ghanaian politician (died 2020)

Prince Imoro Andani
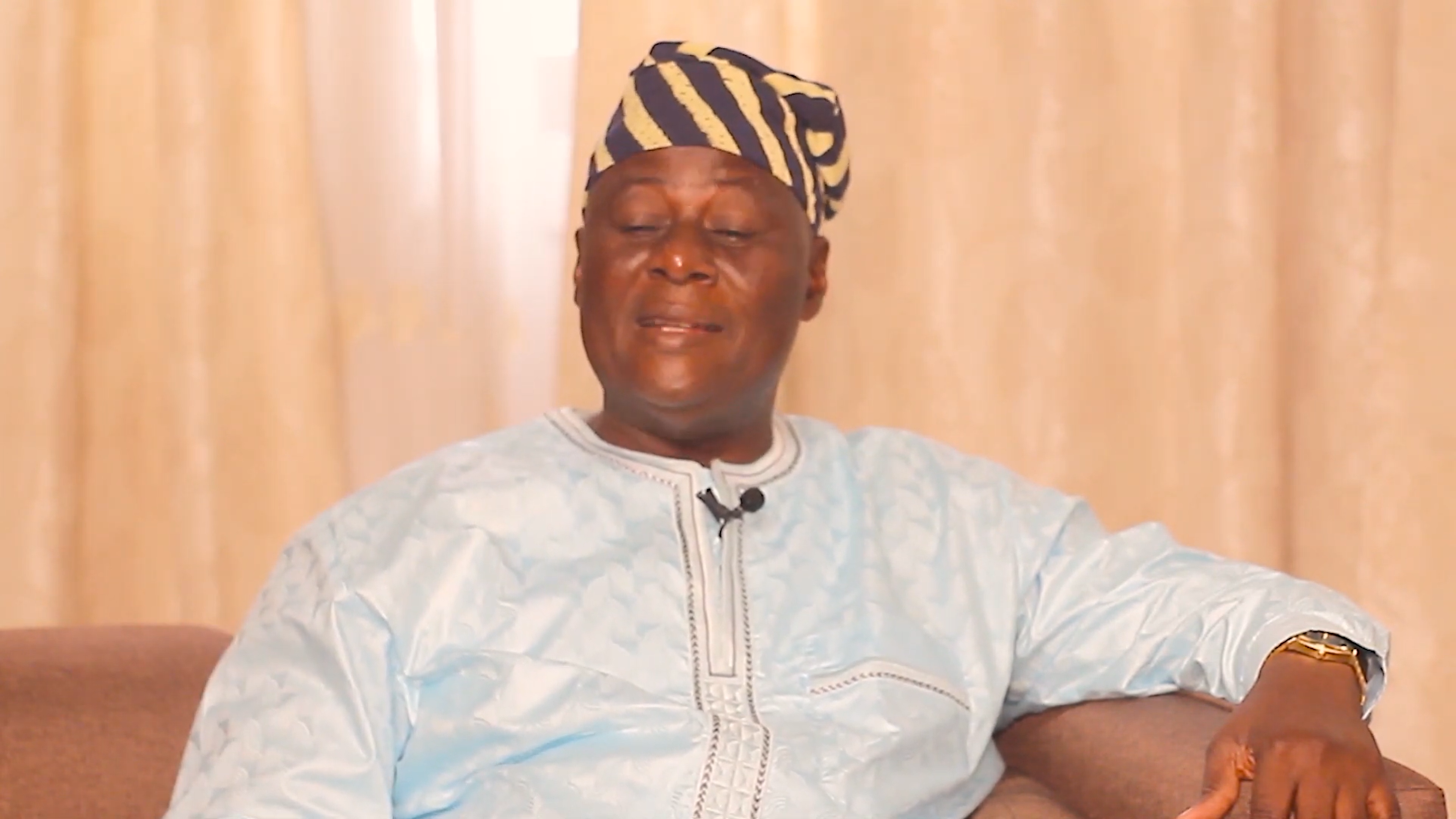

Prince Imoro Andani (died 23 November 2020) was a Northern Regional Minister of Ghana. He resigned in 2002 following a violent conflict in Yendi.

In November 2019, Prince Andani was appointed by Ghana's president as Chairman of Ghana Integrated Iron & Steel Development Corporation, a new agency that is to see to the development of the West African Country's significant iron ore deposit.

Andani died in Accra on Monday, 23 November 2020 in Accra. He was married to Katumi Andani, with whom he had four children.
