= Dagbon music and dance =

Ghanaian tradition of the Dagbamba

Dagbani music and dance is a core tradition of the Dagbamba of West Africa. The Dagbamba speak the Dagbanli language. They are the dominant ethnic group in the kingdom of Dagbon found in the Northern Region of Ghana. Music and dance plays a central role in Dagbon. It is through these arts that the Dagbamba have preserved their history over the centuries. The Dagbamba regard dancing as a form of emotional expression, social interaction, a spiritual performance or even physical exercise that aids them articulate or illustrate ideas or tell a story. In most cases, music in Dagbon is accompanied by dancing in order to form a complete story.

== Music in Dagbon ==
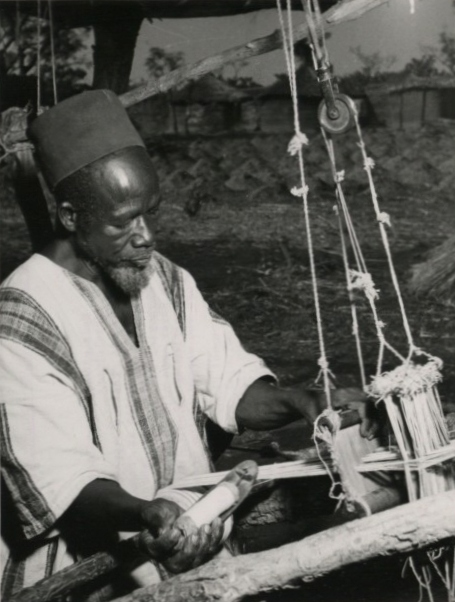
A weaver plies his craft at Flyboyiri (1957)

Dagbani music is best known for an extremely advanced drumming tradition carried out by hereditary praise-singers and oral historians known as the lunsi. Their tradition, which primarily features the hourglass-shaped lunga (talking drum) and the cylindrical gungon (bass drum), is a vital aspect of Dagomba culture.

== Dancing in Dagbon ==
Dagbon music is usually composed specifically to facilitate or accompany dancing.

The Dagomba tribal have different kinds of traditional dance which is facilitated by drummers who play different rhythms and the dancers move accordingly. Some of the traditional dances are popular and can be performed on any occasion while others are a reserve for special events and occasions such funerals, coronation ceremonies and during spiritual sacrifices. Each dance has special regalia but what is common is the smock, "kurugu" and the "muɣuri".

Some of the popular dance are as follows:

=== Takai ===
The Takai dance is the most common male dance which is performed in groups in concentric circles. The usual regalia for this special dance is the smock and "kurugu"-an extended trouser, a hat, metallic rods that's used for the clutching sound, "muɣuri" - a of show and some adornment of metals on the shanks of their legs to provide some rhythmic tune.

=== Baamaaya ===
The Baamaaya, or "the valley is wet," is a popular social dance originating from the Dagbamba of northern Ghana. Its history traces back to a 17th-century drought, where, according to legend, men dressed in feminine clothing to appeal to the gods for rain. Following the successful rainmaking ceremony, they shouted "baa maaya," which commemorates the end of the drought. Now performed by both genders during festivals, funerals, and national celebrations, the Baamaaya features graceful, fluid movements, with dancers performing waist twists and swift footwork while moving in a circle around the drummers. Dancers sometimes wear anklet and waist bells and carry fans, creating a rhythmic and vibrant spectacle.

=== Tɔra (Tora) ===
Tɔra, a dance primarily performed by women, is one of the oldest dances in the Dagomba tradition, dating back to the early stages of the Dagbon kingdom. Its origins are rooted in a tragic and deadly tale concerning a power struggle over the chieftaincy during the reign of Naa Yenzoo. Today, the dance is typically performed at funerals for the elderly, where it serves to generate energy and action over several days. Women and girls form a line and take turns moving out to meet a partner, engaging in a percussive knocking of buttocks on the drum's downbeat. This energetic, spirited performance is accompanied by vibrant, call-and-response songs that enhance the powerful movements.

== Contemporary Music and Dance ==
The Dagbamba have embraced and incorporated modern forms of music though traditional dagbani music and dancing can still be witnessed at formal congregations and at Universities around the world. Locally, it has become much easier to hear Dagbanli music in non-traditional genres like Reggae, Hip hop, Hiplife or Islamic music. On very rare occasions non-traditional Dagbanli music is blended with traditional elements such as drumming.

Modern artists who perform in Dagbanli include Sherifa Gunu, R2bees, Fancy Gadam, Macassio, Fadlan, Don Sigli, Sherif Ghaale, and Awal Alhassan.

The rhythm game series Just Dance features the sound track "Dagomba" in their games. Composed by Sorcerer, the song samples music of the Dagomba people.

The following sound engineers that are helping in producing the "Dagomba" rhythm are Blue Bratz, Dr. Fiza, Stone B, Ojay Dramz, and many more.

== See also ==
- Kambon-waa
- Damba festival
