= Verna Mineral Water =

Brand of bottled water produced in Ghana

Verna Natural Mineral Water
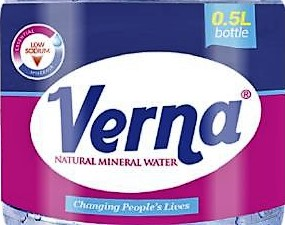
- Country: Ghana
- Produced by: Twellium Industrial Company
- Introduced: 2014; 12 years ago
- pH: 7.0 - 7.5
- Calcium (Ca): 1.4
- Chloride (Cl): 4.0
- Magnesium (Mg): 0.9
- Potassium (K): 0.3
- Website: Verna Mineral Water
- All concentrations in milligrams per liter (mg/L); pH without units

Verna Mineral Water is a brand of bottled water from the Twellium Industrial Company, produced and marketed primarily in Ghana, and considered by reviewers to be among the top-selling bottled water brands in Ghana.

== Production and distribution ==
Verna Mineral Water is produced from protected underground water and bottled by the Twellium Industrial Company headquartered in Medie Kotoku in the Eastern Region of Ghana. While marketing is focused on Ghana, Verna Mineral Water is also sold in Burkina Faso and Togo.

== Rebranding ==
Verna Mineral Water appeared on the market in 2014. In 2017, Verna Natural Mineral Water underwent a rebranding exercise in line with market trends, focusing on its style and appeal to the younger generation.

The plastic bottle containers now involve the display of blue and pink colors on its paper labeling, a pronounced logo for the product, and a yogurt-pink-colored cap.

The rebranding of Verna Mineral Water also reflected a logo of the "Changing Lives" social action project associated with the brand. In June 2019, Verna Mineral Water won the product of the year award in at the third edition of Ghana Manufacturing Awards.

== Changing lives ==
Verna Mineral Water offers a poverty intervention program dubbed Changing Lives, as part of its corporate social responsibility to support the underprivileged and vulnerable members of society. Changing Lives is organised around a television series made up of different episodes, where each episode tells a different story of a successful intervention project the company has carried out. Beneficiaries of Changing Lives have included autistic patients who have received mentorship support from role models to enable them build a career.

In 2017, Changing Lives was extended to Kumasi in the Ashanti Region of Ghana. At its launch, Otumfuo Osei Tutu II endorsed and extended his support for the initiative.
