= Naming customs of the Dagomba people =

As with many ethnic groups in Ghana, names form part of the cultural fabric of the Mole-Dagombas. Naming practices stem from either religious (mainly Islamic names) or traditional origins. Islam is the main religion among the Mole-Dagombas as is evident from the many Islamic names. Some individuals have more than one name, one Islamic and the other traditional. While most names are given at birth, others are given based on some cultural circumstances.

Newborns are given the name Saandoo ('San or Sana' meaning stranger, and doo meaning male) or Sanpaga (Sana meaning stranger and paga for female). This marks the baby as stranger in the family. Seven days after birth, the naming ceremony is performed under the auspices of the father and/or the head of the household. The naming is done either in the indigenous traditional way, known as zugupinbu (meaning shaving of head) where a talisman or soothsayer is consulted to give a name to the new born baby or in the Islamic way, known as Suuna (Hausa word meaning name).

In the traditional ceremony, the baby's hair is shaved (zugupinbu) and a name given by a Soothsayer after consultation with the gods. The soothsayer determines which ancestor the baby reincarnates. The child is then declared to be the ancestor's namesake, Sigililana, which stems from two words sigili (reincarnate) and lana which basically means 'owner'. The name may alternatively be that of a deity or a buguli (shrine).

== Names originating from shrines and ancestors ==
=== Ancestors ===
- Male: Andani, Banzu, Napari, Naporo, Shagba, Yiri, Gariba.
- Female: Napari, Balima (meaning begging), Nakpambo, Samata (also of an Islamic origin), Balemini, Sindoliwa, etc.

=== Shrines (Buguli) ===
- Male: Tia, from which Tido is derived
- Female: Tipaga also from Tia
- Ungendered: Jebuni, Buguli (from which is derived Budaali and Bugudabila), and Zenebu.

== Repeated infant deaths ==
When a mother has a successful birth after repeated infant deaths, the family may decide to take the child to a trash heap to "throw the baby away". A person of different ethnicity/tribe then buys the child and hands the child back to the parents. Such a child is then given a name from the tribe of the buyer. Such names depend solely on the tribe of the buyer and include;

- Male: Tampulimdoo ('Tampulim' is the tribe of the buyer and 'doo' for male), Mamprudoo, Gurundoo, Zabagadoo, etc.

- Female: Tampulimpaga ('paga' for female), Kambungpaga, Kulikulipaga, Zabagapaga, etc.

*TAMPULI is also refers to the "rubish heap" so the name could be interpreted as a "man" (doo) or "woman" (paga) of the rubish heap. Hence Tampulimdoo or Tampulimpaga. The idea being to discourage the return (rebirth) of souls that do not stay after birth.

== Family events, situations and proverbs ==
Babies named for family events are perhaps the most common names. Such names are usually based on proverbs.

Such names include:

- Tunteya: based on a ground growing plant ('Tua'). This names indicates that the family is growing (Dakubu, 2000. p.g 58)
- Zantale ("take someone's fault"): this name is given in reference to quarrels.
- Suhuyini("one heart"): this name specifies that the family is wholehearted.e.g. Alhassan Suhuyin (the member of parliament for Tamale North constituency.)

== Time ==
Names may come from the time of the day. The word neen or nein stems from the world "brightening" and doo for male while paga (female) signals that the baby was born during the day. Such names include:

- Males: Nindow or Naniendo
- Females: Nenpaga or Niema (Females).

Example: Damba (for males), Chimsi (Chimsi is also the name of a month and festival).

Another class of names are given to babies to signify the day of the week they are born. Unlike the southern part of Ghana, this class is less prevalent among the Mole-Dagombas and have no implications for the individual's social identity. Such names can be assumed by anyone.

Gender	Male	Female	Both Sexes
Sunday	-	Lahari	-
Monday	-	Tani	-
Tuesday	-	Talaata	-
Wednesday	-	Lariba	-
Thursday	-	-	Lamisi or Laamishi
Friday	Azindoo	Azima	-
Saturday	Sibido	Sibiri	-

== General references ==
- Kropp Dakubu, Mary Esther (2000). Personal names of the Dagomba. Michigan State University. OCLC 773574013.
- Oppong, Christine (1973). Growing up in Dagbon. Ghana Pub. Corp. OCLC 869372045.
- Krapp Dakubu, Mary Esther (1988). The Languages of Ghana. KPI and International African Institute.
