= Yendi =

- Town & District Capital
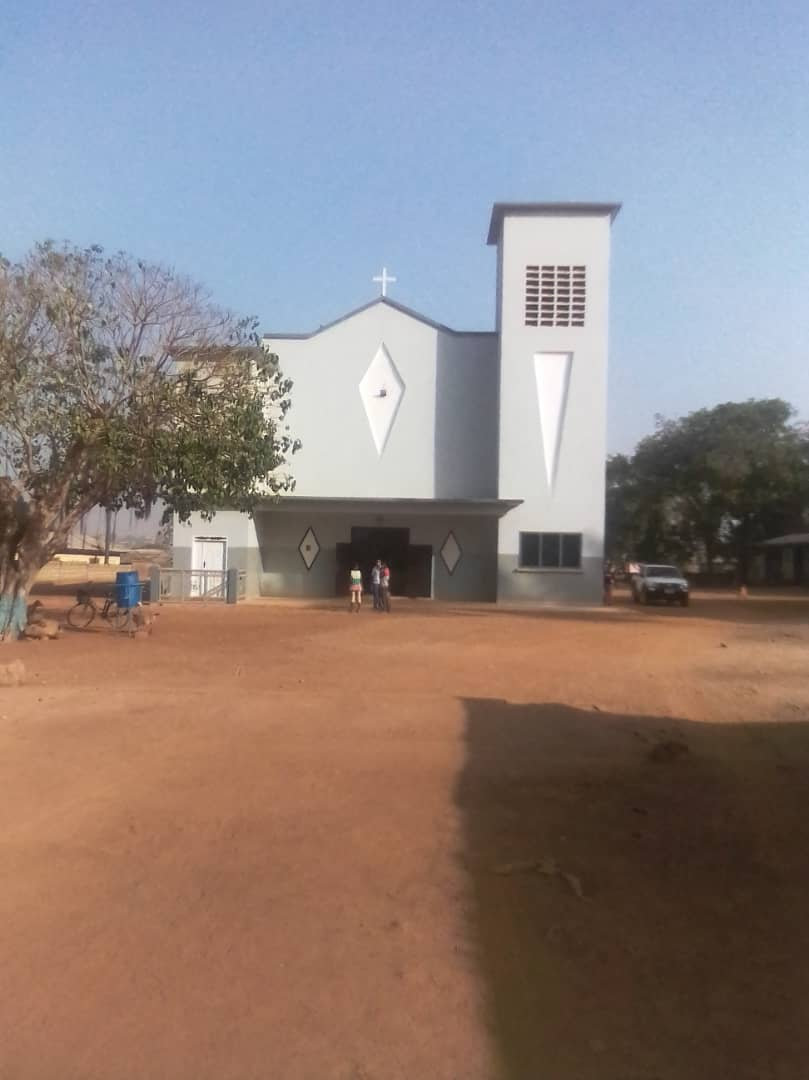
- The Yendi cathedral

- Location of Yendi in Northern region
- Coordinates: 9°25′57″N 0°0′15″W
- Country: Ghana
- Region: Northern Region
- District: Yendi Municipal District

Population (2012)
  - Total: 52,008
- Time zone: GMT
  - Summer (DST): GMT

Yendi (Dagbani: Yani, meaning "Seat of the Yaa Naa"), is the traditional capital of the Kingdom of Dagbon and the administrative centre of the Yendi Municipal District in the Northern Region of Ghana. As of 2021, the population of Yendi was 154,421 comprising 76,142 males and 78,279 females. It is the seat of the King of the Dagbon, Ghana's oldest kingdom.

== History ==
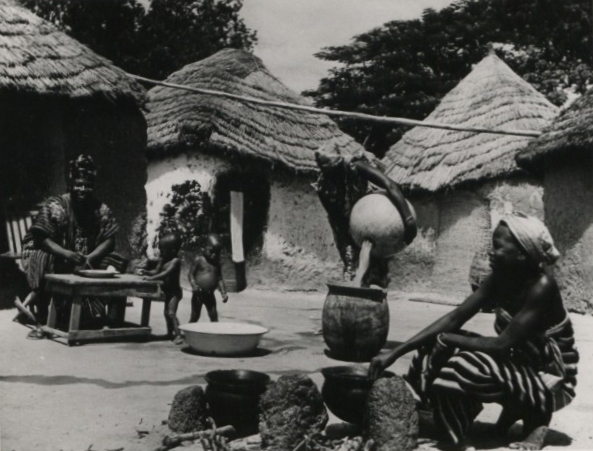
A typical Yendi household in 1957

King Nyaɣisi constructed Yendi between 1420 and 1500. Yendi is the capital of the Kingdom of Dagbon. The area was abandoned due to an invasion by King Sumaila Ndewura Jakpa of Gonja, which resulted in the death of the Dagboŋ King Dariziogo. Yendi was conquered by the Asante Empire under the leadership of Opoku Ware I in 1744 or 1745, but there is academic dispute about the verifiability of this.

The area was taken over by the German Empire and incorporated into Togoland in 1901. The Ya Na resumed their control over Dagbon after the British seized Togoland from Germany as a result of World War I.

23 people were killed in a massacre by the Ghanaian army on 9 September 1969. In 2002, a massacre in Yendi killed at least 30 people, including Yakubu II.

== Politics ==
In the 1969 parliamentary election Shanni Hazrat Mahama, the nominee of the Progress Party, defeated by the National Alliance of Liberals' candidate by a vote of 3,987 to 3,343.

== Education ==
Formal education started in the pre-colonial era where a trade school was established in Yendi in 1922. and named Moliyili. Yaa Naa Abdulai II ordered the construction of the Yendi Native Administrative School which was opened in 1937 following the establishment of the 1927 administrative reforms. However, the Ghana Education Fund (GET Fund) scheme post-independence moved the focus of education to Tamale as it became the primary regional education hub.

The Yendi Municipal District host several public and private basic, secondary and tertiary educational institutions.

=== Secondary Education ===
Yendi as the traditional capital of Dagbon has several senior high schools. Among them is Yendi Senior High School, also known as YESS.

Tertiary EducationYendi Municipality currently has several tertiary education:

- St. Vincent College of Education

== Economy ==
The value of trade going through Yendi rose from RM 11,848 in 1905, to RM 27,250 in 1907, and RM 51,152 in 1909.

In 2004, proposals surfaced to link iron ore mines in the vicinity of Yendi by rail.

== Climate ==
Climate data for Yendi (1981–2010)
Month	Jan	Feb	Mar	Apr	May	Jun	Jul	Aug	Sep	Oct	Nov	Dec	Year
Mean daily maximum °C (°F)	35.5 (95.9)	37.7 (99.9)	38.1 (100.6)	36.3 (97.3)	34.2 (93.6)	31.8 (89.2)	30.2 (86.4)	29.9 (85.8)	30.8 (87.4)	32.6 (90.7)	35.3 (95.5)	35.3 (95.5)	34.0 (93.1)
Mean daily minimum °C (°F)	20.3 (68.5)	23.0 (73.4)	25.0 (77.0)	25.1 (77.2)	24.0 (75.2)	22.7 (72.9)	22.3 (72.1)	22.1 (71.8)	21.9 (71.4)	22.1 (71.8)	20.7 (69.3)	19.8 (67.6)	22.4 (72.4)
Average rainfall mm (inches)	3.8 (0.15)	4.7 (0.19)	43.3 (1.70)	89.2 (3.51)	116.6 (4.59)	170.6 (6.72)	180.9 (7.12)	228.8 (9.01)	262.0 (10.31)	101.0 (3.98)	6.5 (0.26)	2.8 (0.11)	1,210.2 (47.65)
Average rainy days (≥ 0.1 mm)	1	1	3	5	8	11	11	14	16	9	1	1	81
Source: World Meteorological Organization

== See also ==
- Yendi Airport
- Yendi Senior High School
- Roman Catholic Diocese of Yendi
- Gbewaa palace

== Works cited ==
=== Journals ===
- Haas, Karl (2017). "A View From the Periphery: A Re-Assessment of Asante-Dagbamba Relations in the 18th Century". International Journal of African Historical Studies. 50 (2). African Studies Center, Boston University: 205–224. doi:10.2307/44723447. JSTOR 44723447.
- Ladouceur, Paul (1972). "The Yendi Chieftaincy Dispute and Ghanaian Politics". Canadian Journal of African Studies. 6 (1). Taylor & Francis: 97–115. doi:10.2307/484154. JSTOR 484154.
- MacGaffey, Wyatt (2007). "A History of Tamale, 1907-1957 and Beyond". Transactions of the Historical Society of Ghana. Historical Society of Ghana: 109–124. doi:10.2307/41406735. JSTOR 41406735.
- MacGaffey, Wyatt (2006). "Death of a King, Death of a Kingdom? Social Pluralism and Succession to High Office in Dagbon, Northern Ghana". Journal of Modern African Studies. 44 (1). Cambridge University Press: 79–99. doi:10.2307/3876102. JSTOR 3876102.
- Norris, Edward (1984). "The Hausa Kola Trade Through Togo, 1899-1912: Some Quantifications". Paideuma: Mitteilungen zur Kulturkunde. Frobenius Institute: 161–184. doi:10.2307/23076627. JSTOR 23076627.
- Shinnie, P.; Ozanne, P. (1962). "Excavations at Yendi Dabari". Transactions of the Historical Society of Ghana. 6. Historical Society of Ghana: 87–118. doi:10.2307/41405754. JSTOR 41405754.
