= Kambon-waa =

Kambon-waa is a warrior dance of the Dagbamba of West Africa that emerged following interactions between Dagbaŋ and Asanteman in the mid-18th century. The musicians of Kambon-waa are called Kambonsi (sing: kamboŋa). The terminology Kambonsi and kamboŋa are also used to refer to the Akan people albeit in a different contextual meaning.

== Rhythms of Kambon-waa ==
Five main pieces characterize the core music of the kambon-waa.

- Sochendi
- Bendewili
- Kambon-waa
- Chakowili: is a small lua basic rhythm that is played in Kambon-waa, particularly during funerals when the musicians are entering or exiting the gambei.

It is played as a pre-performance to notify people of the start of kambon-waa.

- Namyo
