= Yidana =

Ghanaian male head in Dagbamba culture

Yidana is a title of the landlord or male head of a family for the Mole Dagbani people. Yidana broadly translates to "husband" in English and is mostly used in conversation. A more common term of endearment that a wife may use to address their husband with either in public or in person is n-duu lana ("owner of my room").
