= Twellium Industrial Company =

Ghanaian multinational beverage corporation

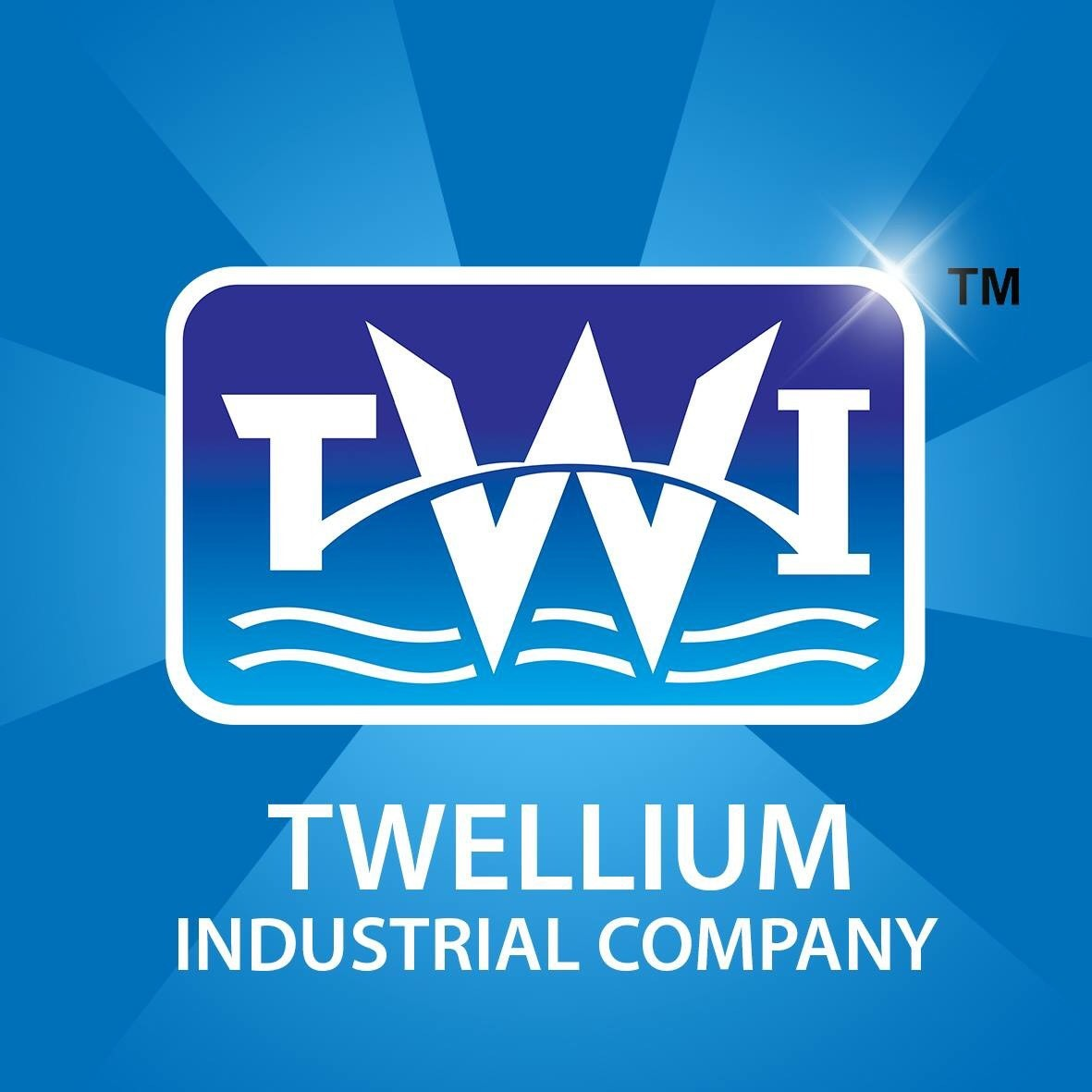
- Industry: Beverage
- Founded: September 2013, Ghana
- Founder: Hussein Kesserwani and Hassan Kesserwani.
- Headquarters: Medie - Adjen Kotoku, Eastern Region (Ghana), Ghana
- Area served: Burkina Faso, Ghana, Senegal
- Products: Food and Beverage
- Website: twellium.com

Twellium Industrial Company is Ghanaian multinational beverage corporation headquartered at Nsawam in Ghana. Twellium Industrial uses pure and natural mineral water, employing Italian and European technology and international standards in our manufacturing processes.

== Establishment ==
Twellium Industrial Company was established in September 2013 by Hussein and Hassan Kesserwani to manufacture, retail, and market non-alcoholic beverages. In February 2014, the company obtained the franchise from Monarch Beverage Company to produce four beverages including Rush Energy drink, Original American Cola, Planet Range and Bubble Up lemon lime.

== Products and brands ==
By July 2017,Twellium Industrial Company employed a Sidel Matrix range of equipment to operate 7 production lines producing 32000 bottles per hour. As of April 2021, Twellium Industrial Company produced Verna Natural Mineral Water, Verna Active Water, Verna Premium Water, Chale Fruit Drinks, Rush Energy Drink, Planet Drink, Run Energy Drink, Rasta Choco Malt, American Cola, Go On Energy Drink and Bigoo.

=== Product categories ===
Beverages

- Verna Mineral Water
- Rush Energy Drink
- American Cola
- Planet, Bigoo, Run

Juices & Malt

- Chale drinks
- Rasta Choco Malt

Cookies

- McBerry biscuits
- Cakes & confectionery

== Awards ==
- 2024: Best Confectionery, Mineral Water, and Soft Drink Producing Company at the Ghana Manufacturing Awards.
- 2025: Millennium Excellence Award for initiatives supporting employment, women’s empowerment, and social welfare.
- 2025: Ultimate Best Manufacturing Company of the Year at the Ghana Beverage Awards.

== Sponsorships ==
Twellium Industrial Company was involved in the sponsorship of civic engagement activities, including the annual National Quran Recitation Competition in Ghana, autism awareness. In 2019, the company built a kindergarten block for the community school at Dzabukpo in the Central Tongu District.
