= Historical Society of Ghana =

Historical society in Ghana

- Predecessor: Gold Coast & Togoland Historical Society
- Formation: 1951; 75 years ago
- Type: Historical society
- Purpose: Preservation and promotion of Ghanaian history, culture and heritage
- Headquarters: Accra, Ghana
- Region served: Ghana
- Official language: English

The Historical Society of Ghana is a nonprofit organisation based in Accra, Ghana dedicated to the collection, preservation, interpretation and promotion of Ghanaian history and culture. It was established in 1951 by the Gold Coast intelligentsia. The founding group of scholars included Albert Adu Boahen, John D. Fage, J. B. Danquah, Alexander Adum Kwapong, Kobina Sekyi and Nana Kobina Nketsia. Several public institutions coordinate the work of the historical society. These include high schools, normal colleges and public research universities such as the University of Ghana, Kwame Nkrumah University of Science and Technology, University of Cape Coast, University of Education, Winneba, the University for Development Studies, Tamale. Areas covered include archaeology, anthropology, history, linguistics, sociology among others. By 1983, the work of the society had collapsed due to a military dictatorship and an economic downturn in Ghana. The historical society resumed its work in 2001. In its early years, the organisation was the publisher of the Ghana Notes and Queries and Teachers Journal targeting history tutors in Ghanaian high schools. From 1952 to 1956, the Society published the Transactions of the Gold Coast & Togoland Historical Society. After Ghana gained its independence from the United Kingdom in 1957, the journal became the Transactions of the Historical Society of Ghana, re-introduced twice in 1995 and 1998 after a period of dormancy.
