= Abibata Shanni Mahama Zakariah =

Ghanaian banker

Abibata Shanni Mahama Zakariah was born in Yendi and is the daughter of Alhaji Shanni Mahama, who was a former MP for the Yendi Constituency of Ghana and a Deputy Minister for Agriculture in the government of former prime minister K. A. Busia. She was appointed Deputy CEO of the Microfinance and Small Loans Centre (MASLOC) in 2017 and got elevated to the position of substantive Chief Executive in September 2021 after her immediate boss, Stephen Amoah, left to start a career as Parliamentarian for the Nhyiaso Constituency.

== Personal life and education ==
She attended University of Ghana where she graduated with a Bachelor of Arts degree in Psychology. She also has a Master of Public Policy and Administration (MPPA) degree from the School of International and Public Affairs (SIPA) of Columbia University in New York City with focus on Economic and Political Development.

She is married with four children.

== Career ==
She is a Ghanaian banker, policy practitioner, business development strategist and a politician. She has extensive work experience from different local and international organisations such as the Agricultural Development Bank (Ghana), The Millennium Cities Initiative – MCI in collaboration with Earth Institute of Columbia University (Accra, Ghana), Consultancy for The Capacity Development Group (UNDP, New York), Merchant Bank Ghana Limited (Accra, Ghana) and Jospong Group of Companies (Accra, Ghana).

Before the 2020 general elections, she was part of those who contested to represent her party, the New Patriotic Party as its parliamentary candidate for the Yendi constituency but lost to Farouk Aliu Mahama, son of late former Vice President of the Republic of Ghana Alhaji Aliu Mahama.

In January 2024, Abibata contested her party's parliamentary primaries, hoping to be second time lucky in her quest to represent her party as its parliamentary candidate for the General Election that year. The internal election was marred by violence leading to the Electoral Commission being unable to call the results in favor of any of the contesting candidates. However, The National Executive of the NPP in April 2024, after having instituted a committee to investigate the primaries, declared incumbent MP, Farouk Aliu Mahama as the Party's Parliamentary Candidate for the Yendi Constituency for Election 2024. Abibata in a statement stated her disagreement with the decision but said she will respect it in the "supreme interest of the party."
