= Yakubu I =

King of Dagbon in northern Ghana in the early 19th century

- Yaa Naa King of Dagombas; Overlord of Dagbon
- Reign: c. 1829 – c. 1849
- Predecessor: Sumani Zwole
- Successor: Abdulai I

Ya Naa Yakubu (Yakuba) I was Ya-Na, or king, of the Kingdom of Dagbon in northern Ghana. He ruled between c. 1829 and c. 1849, however other sources put his reign roughly between c. 1799 and c. 1839.

== See also ==
- List of rulers of the Northern state of Dagomba
