= Yaa Naa =

Absolute monarch of the Kingdom of Dagbon

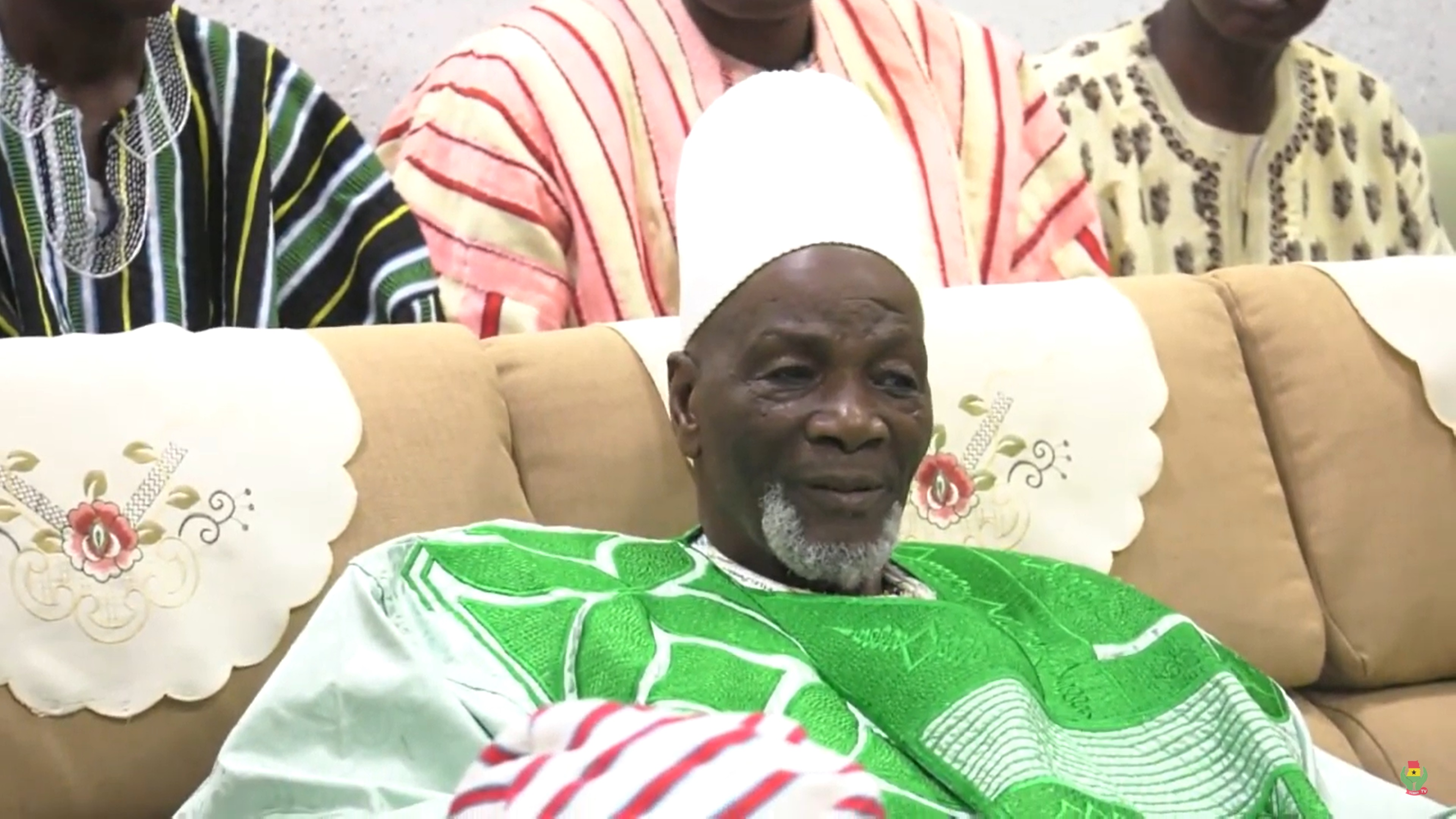
His Royal Highness Yaa Naa Bukali Mahama II's, King of Dagbon, traditional ruler of the Kingdom of Dagbon in Ghana

The Yaa Naa is the title of the king of Dagbon, the Kingdom of the Dagomba people, located in the Northern Region of present-day Ghana. The most recent Yaa Naa was Mahama Abukari Gariba II who was enskinned on Friday, January 25, 2019. He died on July 12, 2026.

The Lion of Gbewaa is the totemic symbol of the Yaa Naa.

The Konkomba, Bimoba, Chekosi, Basaari, Chamba, Gurusi and Zantasi tribes reside within Dagbon.

== Titles of the Yaa Naa ==
The titles of the Yaa Naa include Naa Gbewaa, Yoɣu Tolana, Saɣinlana, Tihi ni Mori Lana.

== List of the Yaa Naas ==
For detailed genealogy, see List of Kings of Dagbon

Name of Yaa Naa	Period of Kingship	Number of Years
Naa Nyagse	1416 - 1432	16 Years
Naa Zuulande	1432–1442	10 Years
Naa Beriguyumda	1442–1456	14 Years
Naa Daligudamda	1456–1469	13 Years
Naa Zoligu	1469–1486	17 Years
Naa Zong	1486–1506	20 Years
Naa Neng-Mitong	1506–1514	8 Years
Naa Dimani	1514–1527	13 Years
Naa Yanzo	1527–1543	16 Years
Naa Darizeugu	1543–1554	11 Years
Naa Luro	1554–1570	16 Years
Naa Tutugri	1570–1589	19 Years
Naa Zagle	1589–1609	20 Years
Naa Zolkugli	1609–1627	18 Years
Naa Gungoble	1627–1648	21 Years
Naa Zangina	1648–1677	29 Years
Naa Andani Sigile	1677–1687	10 Years
Naa Binbegu	1687–1700	13 Years
Naa Gariba	1700–1720	20 Years
Naa Salan Zeblim	1720–1735	15 Years
Naa Zeblim Bandamda	1735–1749	14 Years
Naa Andani Jengbariga	1749–1765	16 Years
Naa Mahami	1765–1785	20 Years
Naa Sumani Zoli	1785–1806	21 Years
Naa Zablim Kulunku	1806–1824	18 Years
Naa Yakubu Nantoo	1824–1849	25 Years
Naa Abdulai Nagbiogu	1849–1876	27 Years
Naa Andani Naanigoe	1876–1899	23 Years
Naa Alhassan Tipariga	1899–1917	18 Years
Naa Abudu Satan Kugli	1917–1938	21 Years
Naa Mahaman Kpema	1938–1948	10 Years
Naa Mahaman Bila	1948–1953	5 Years
Naa Abdulai Gmarigong	1953–1968	15 Years
Naa Andani Zoli-kugli	1968–1968	100 Days
Naa Mahamadu Abdulai	1969–1974	5 Years
Naa Yakubu Andani	1974–2019 (Including the period his regent ruled as a caretaker)	45 Years
Naa Gariba II	2019–2026	7 Years
