= Dagomba people =

Ethnic group in Ghana

Dagomba
Dagbamba
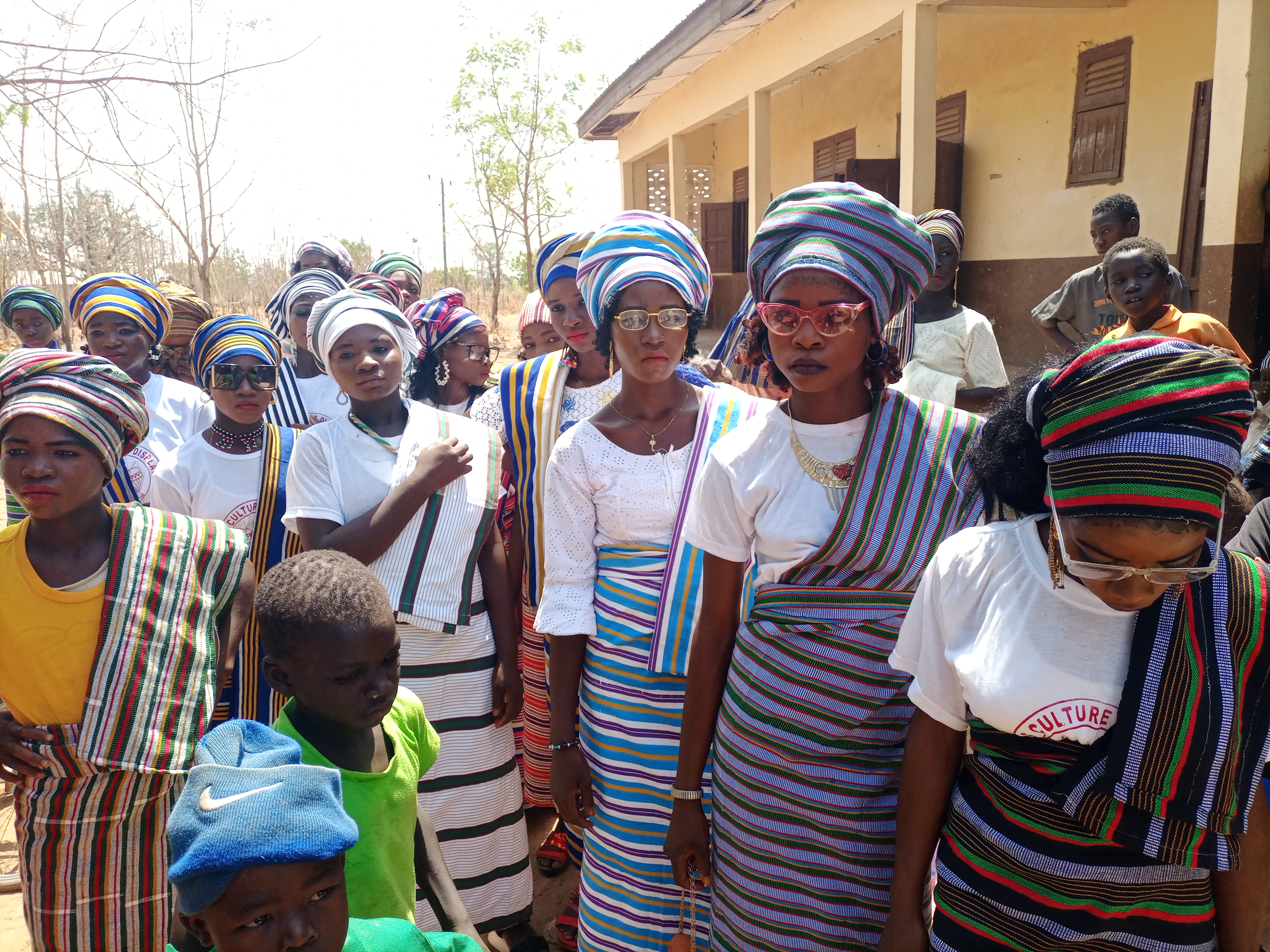

Total population
- 3.2 million

Regions with significant populations
- Kingdom of Dagbon (northern Ghana)

Languages
- Dagbani, English, French

Religion
- Sunni Islam, Dagbon traditional religion

Related ethnic groups
- Mossi, Mamprusi, Frafra, Gurunsi, other Gur peoples

- Person: Dagbana
- People: Dagbamba
- Language: Dagbanli
- Country: Dagbaŋ

The Dagomba or Dagbamba are an ethnic group of Ghana and Togo. Their population is over 3.1 million. The term Dagbamba originally referred to other related peoples who were unified by Naa Gbewaa, including the Mamprusi and Nanumba.

The Dagomba country is called Dagbon and they speak the Dagbani language. Dagbani is a widely spoken language in northern Ghana. Dagbani belongs to the Mabia (Mole-Dagbani) subgroup of the Gur languages, a large group of related languages in West Africa. The Dagomba practice both patrilineal and matrilineal systems of inheritance.

In the late 17th century, King Zanjina became the first ruler to practice Islam. During the reign of Zanjina, the region experienced economic growth. Learning centres were established, and scholarship became a part of the local tradition. In 1700, the University Moliyili was established, but it was later abandoned during European colonization. The Dagomba resisted European colonization even after Germany burnt down and occupied its capital, Yendi, located in Eastern Dagbon (Naya).

The Dagomba are historically related to the Mossi people of Burkina Faso, and the two groups formed prominent West African medieval empires. The Dagomba are known for their sophisticated oral tradition, hierarchical chieftaincy system, and being one of the few African ethnic groups to reserve royal titles and land ownership for female chiefs.

The Dagomba are one of the few African ethnic groups who reserve royal titles for women. Dagomba women rule, ascend to royal positions with male subjects and own regal lands. Notable Dagomba women include Ghana's first female minister, and Africa's first female cabinet minister. Historically, Yennenga is regarded in oral tradition as the founder of the Mossi kingdoms, a people who constitute nearly half of the nation of Burkina Faso. The Gundo Naa is the head of all female chiefs, and the Zosimli Naa enhances collaboration between cities of Dagbon and sister cities.

== Origins ==
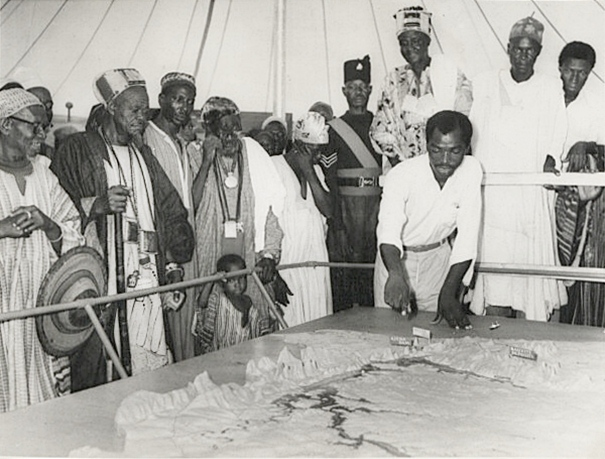
Northern territories chiefs and elders at the Volta River project travelling exhibition (1950)

The Dagomba have inhabited northern Ghana for thousands of years. Some members of the ruling class descend from Naa Gbewaa, whose ancestors migrated from around the areas of Lake Chad after the break up of the Ghana Empire at the end of the 13th century. Gbewaa unified the Dagomba people into a kingdom. Chiefs who are descendants of Gbewaa are the Nanima (singular: Naa) and aboriginal chiefs are the Tindaamba (singular: Tindana). Other important chiefs, such as the chiefs of Tolon, Kumbungu and Gulkpeɣu (Tamale), may not be descendants of Gbewaa.

The Mossi and Dagomba states were prominent West African medieval empires. Beginning in the 12th century, they eventually ruled the lands of the entire northern Volta basin, which today includes all of northern Ghana and Burkina Faso. During their second northern expansion, the Mossi invasion reached eastern Maasina and Lake Débo c. 1400, Benka in c. 1433 and Walata in 1477-83 (these empires were in present-day Mali). According to Illiasu (1971) in his work The Origins of the Mossi-Dagomba states, the second period of the Mossi-Dagomba success came to an end with the restoration of Imperial Songhai power towards the close of the 15th century. Although the Mossi-Dagomba states share a common ancestor (Naa Gbewa), the Dagomba are traditionally regarded as "senior" to the Mossi states of Ouagadougou, Yatenga and Fada N'Gourma.

== Kingdom of Dagbon ==
The homeland of the Dagomba is called Dagbon and covers about 20,000 km^{2} (7,700 sq mi) in area. The territories of Dagbon were decentralised until their unification by the Nanima. The Dagomba share cultural ties with related peoples whose lands were also unified. These include the Mamprusi, Nanumba, Gonja, Mossi, Gurunsi (in particular the Frafra and Kusasi peoples), the Wala people and Ligbi. The area constitutes fourteen administrative districts in present-day Ghana. These are the Tamale Metropolitan, Yendi, Savelugu and Sagnerigu municipals, and Tolon, Kumbungu, Nanton, Gushegu, Karaga, Zabzugu, Saboba, Sang, Tatale and Cheriponi districts.

The king of the Dagbon Traditional Kingdom is the Ya-Na, whose court and administrative capital is at Yendi. Dagbon as a kingdom was never subjugated until it was incorporated as a territory of the Gold Coast government. The Dagbon Kingdom historically held administrative responsibilities over previously acephalous groups like the Konkomba, Bimoba, Chekosi, Basaari, Chamba, Wala, Gurusi and Zantasi. The Dagomba maintain relationships with these groups. The seat of the Yaa Naa or king of Dagbon (literally translated as "King of Absolute Power") is a collection of lion and cow skins. Thus, the Dagbon or its political system is often called the Yendi Skin (not throne, crown or stool). Another characteristic of the Dagomba is that their houses are arranged in a specific order, where the chief or elderly man has his hut built in the centre. The largest settlement of the Dagomba is Tamale, Ghana's third most populous city and the capital of the Northern Region.

== Chieftaincy ==
One of the major features of Dagomba society is chieftaincy. Their system of chieftaincy is hierarchical, with the Yaa Naa, or paramount King, at its head and a tiered system of rulers below him. In Dagbon, chiefs traditionally sit on a stack of skins.

=== Leadership structure ===
The leadership structure of Dagbon is divided into territorial chiefdoms. Each chief oversees specific towns, regions, artifacts or resources, such as specific trees within the kingdom. Chiefs are often appointed from royal families.

The Dagomba founded the Kingdom of Dagbon. They are historically related to the Mossi people of Burkina Faso. The Mossi Kingdoms were founded by Yennenga, a daughter of Naa Gbewaa. The Mohi/Mossi have their homeland in central Burkina Faso. In addition to the Mossi, the Dagomba founded the Bouna state of the Ivory Coast, and the Dagaaba states of the Upper West Region of Ghana. According to tradition, the Kingdom was founded by northern invaders in the 14th century and was extended south to the Black Volta River.

Today, the indigenous Tindaamba preserve ancient Dagbon traditions, leading traditional religious acts and addressing local issues. The Tindaamba are not appointed by the Yaa Naa; they are chosen by an oracle. The Dagbon Kingdom historically held administrative responsibilities over previously acephalous groups like the Konkomba, Bimoba, Chekosi, Basaari, Chamba, Wala, Gurusi and Zantasi, and the Dagomba maintain relationships with these groups.

Naa Gbewaa is the founder of the Dagbon Kingdom. Prior to Naa Gbewaa, the Dagomba lived in decentralized states. Gbewaa and his descendants centralized the kingdom. The decentralized states were headed by the Tindaamba. Today, the Tindaamba preserve Dagbon traditions, leading traditional religious acts and addressing local issues. The Tindaamba are not appointed by the Yaa Naa; they are chosen by an oracle. Inheritance is both patrilineal and matrilineal. Royalty in Dagbon is complex as it has evolved through the centuries. The Dagomba have an oral tradition that incorporates drums and other musical instruments. Dagbon history has been passed down via oral tradition, with drummers acting as professional griots known as Lunsi. According to oral tradition, the political history of Dagbon has its origin in the life story of a legend called Tohazie (translated as "red hunter").

== Society and culture ==
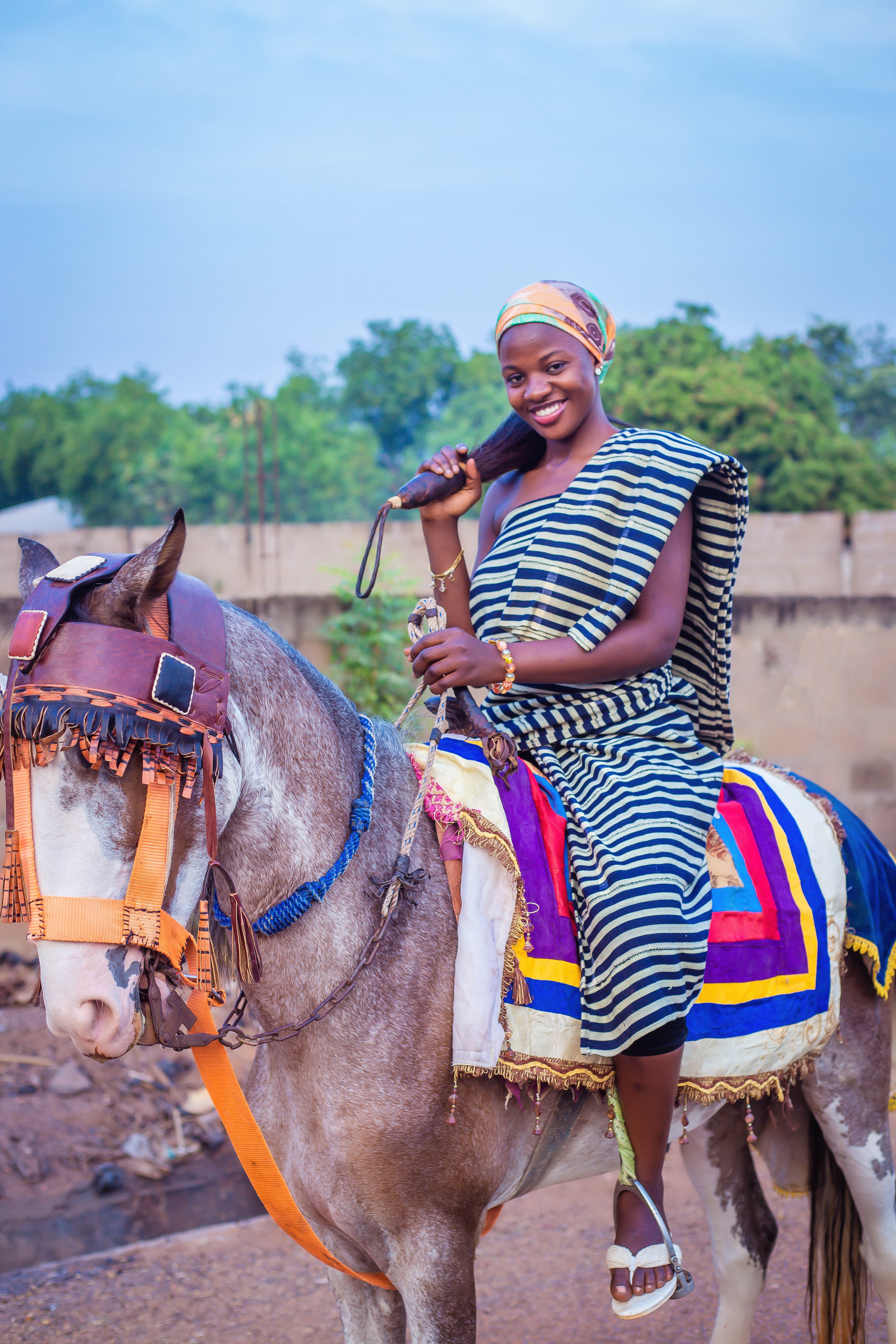
A Dagomba lady on a horse.

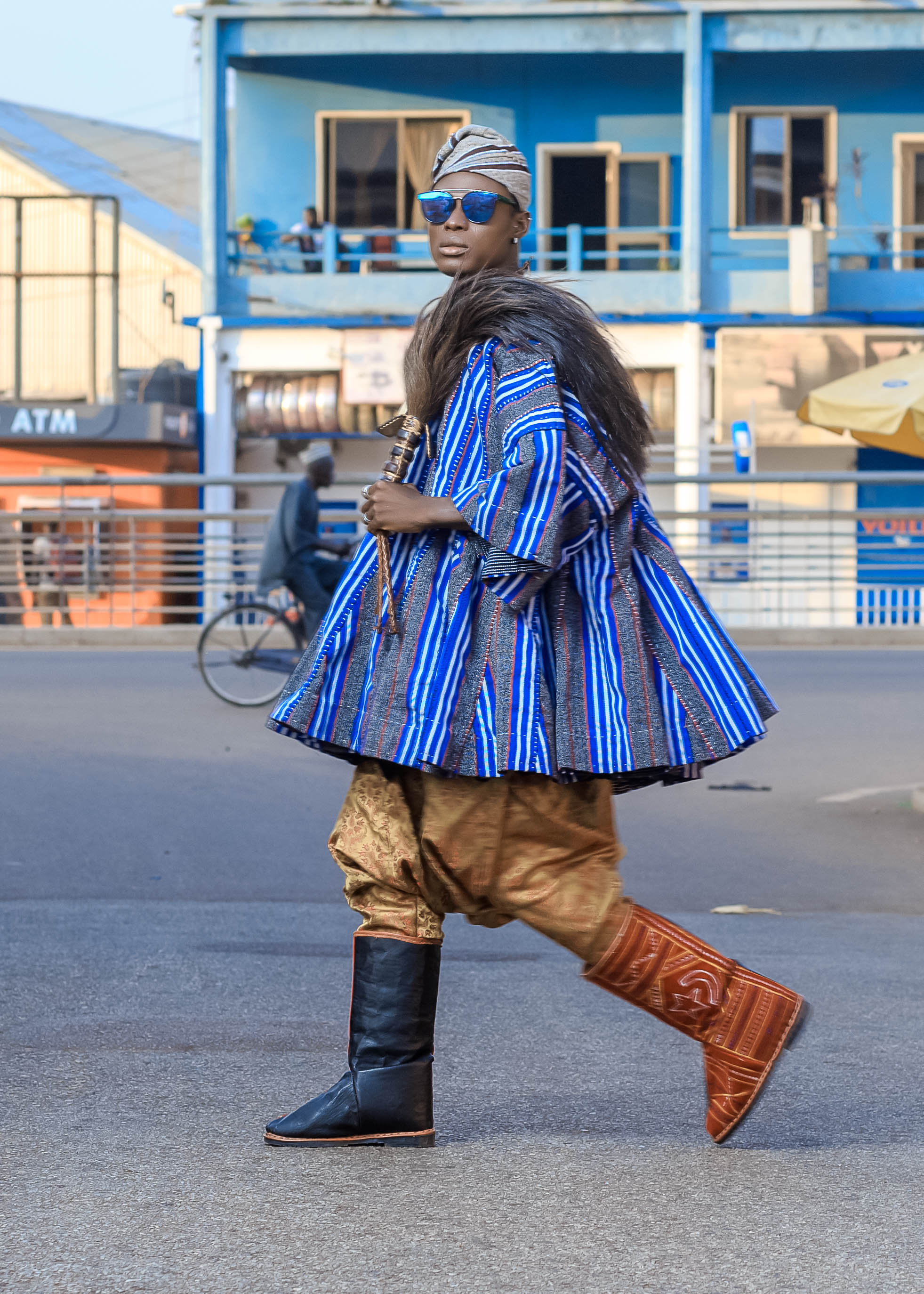
A man in a full Dagomba traditional wear.

=== Family and kinship ===
In Dagomba society, familial bonds between siblings are highly emphasized. Closest family bonds are termed "Mabihili". Both males and females in such a close family bond refer to each other as Mabia (mother's child), signifying the importance of the mother. Motherland is termed Mayili and fatherland is termed Bayili. There is no direct English equivalent of Mabihili. Inheritance among the Dagomba people is largely patrilineal; however, the inheritance of certain Tindaamba is matrilineal.

In Dagomba society, women hold significant roles, and familial bonds between siblings are emphasized. Women are held in high regard, and children fear the displeasure and wrath of the mother. Brothers protect the dignity of sisters at all costs. The Dagomba are one of the few peoples in Africa to have female chiefs who possess regal lands and rule over male subjects, such as the Gundo Naa and the Kpatu Naa.

=== Language and education ===
The Dagomba established several schools prior to European arrival. A notable institution was the University of Moliyili, established in 1700. Moliyili had a hierarchical scholastic system similar to modern universities. The Dagomba have a writing system, the Dagbani script, which uses a modified Arabic alphabet but Dagbani syntax. The archival manuscripts have been lost, but many were transferred to Denmark. After joining the Gold Coast as a protectorate (not a colony), the Dagomba adopted the Greek and Latin alphabets.

== Religion ==
In Dagomba society, there are several gods (singular: wuni, plural: wuna). The chief (Naa) of all these gods is Naawuni. Each city has a shrine (buɣli). For example, the shrine of the People of Tolon is Jaagbo, and that of Nyankpala is Wonoyili. There are many soothsayers (baɣa) whom people consult for prophesies and solutions to their problems. The inheritance of many soothsaying roles is through a maternal brother.

The Dagomba practice both Islam and the Dagbon Traditional Religion. Islam was brought to the region by Soninke (known as Wangara by Ghanaians) traders between the 12th and 15th centuries. Since the time of Naa Zanjina, Islam has been the state religion and has grown steadily. The reformist activities of Afa Ajura in the middle of the twentieth century led many communities to convert to Islam. The arrival of Islam was associated with trade and economic growth, while the introduction of Christianity coincided with European colonization, during which some cities were burned and populations displaced.

Several Christian evangelical groups have attempted to convert the Dagomba without widespread success. Today, the Dagomba have provided free lands to many Christian missionaries to undertake their activities. Some sources state that while Islamic schools do not mandate worship, Christian schools have made worship compulsory for all students, including members of the Dagbon Traditional Religion and Islam.

== Dagomba festivals ==
The Dagomba celebrate several festivals, including the Fire Festival, which existed prior to the formation of the Kingdom of Dagbon. Other festivals include the Damba Festival, Guinea Fowl (Kpini Chuɣu) Festival, Yam Festival (Nyuli Dibu), Konyuri Chuɣu (Eid al-Fitr) and Chimsi Chuɣu (Eid al-Adha). Other minor localized festivals include the Market Festival (Daa Chuɣu) celebrated by the people of Tolon.

=== Bugum (Fire) Festival ===
Bugum Festival, also known as the Fire Festival, is an occasion where families gather for communal celebrations and rituals to honor their ancestors, ask for blessings and ward off evil spirits. Many different ethnic groups in Northern Ghana celebrate this festival. Attendees of the festivity include both Muslims and non-Muslims. Muslims celebrate the fire festival, known as Bugum, to commemorate the arrival of Prophet Noah's (Nuhu) Ark following the flood. During the night, bundles of grass are utilized as torches to celebrate. Since the celebration brings in a new year, some non-Muslims use this time to offer sacrifices to God and their ancestors.

== Notable people ==
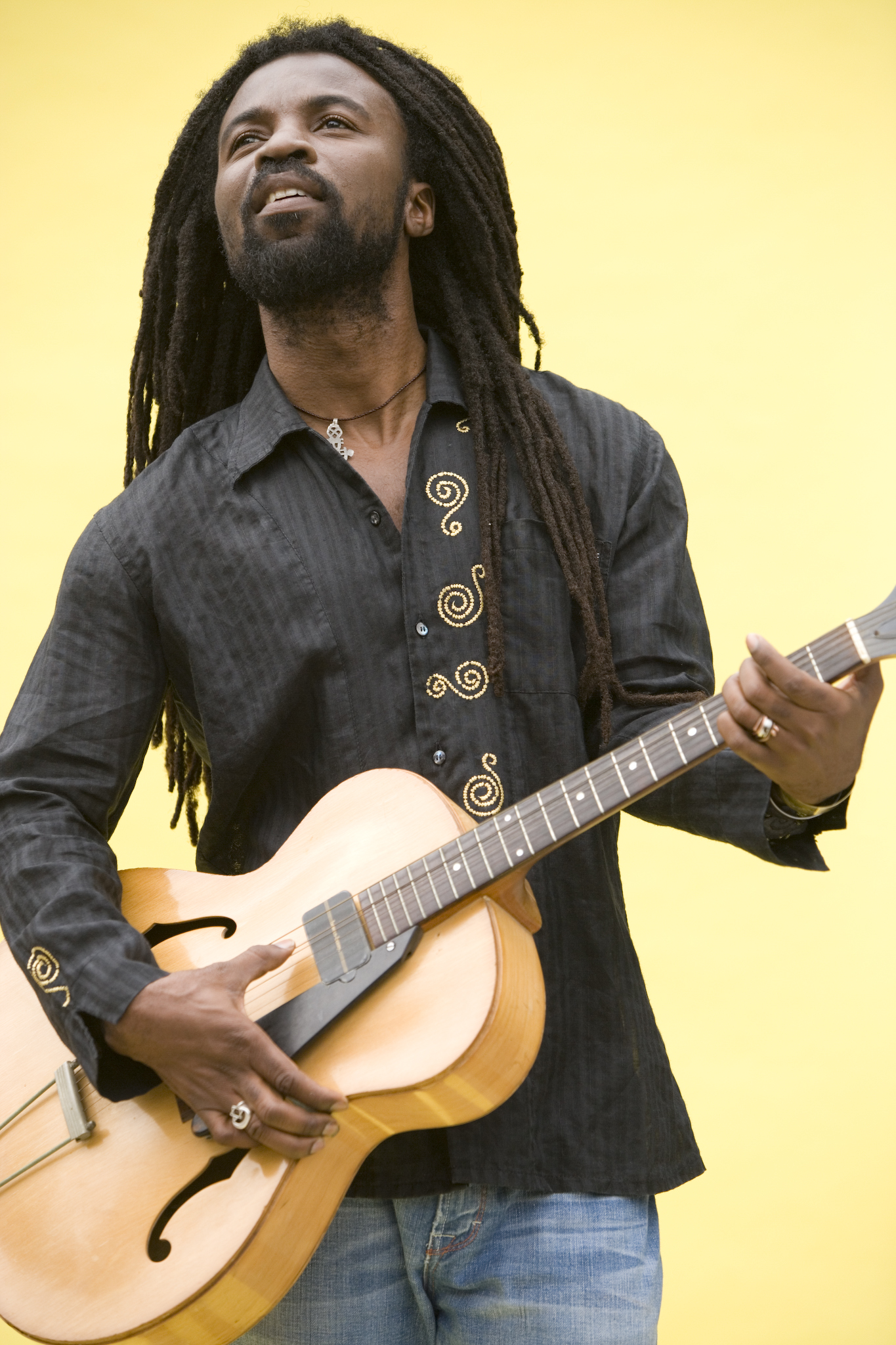
Rocky Dawuni

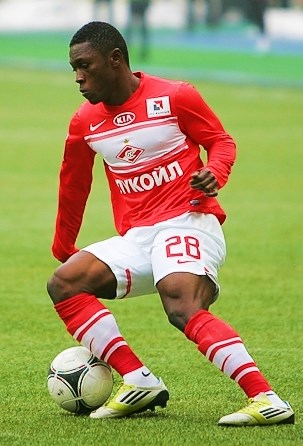
Abdul Majeed Waris

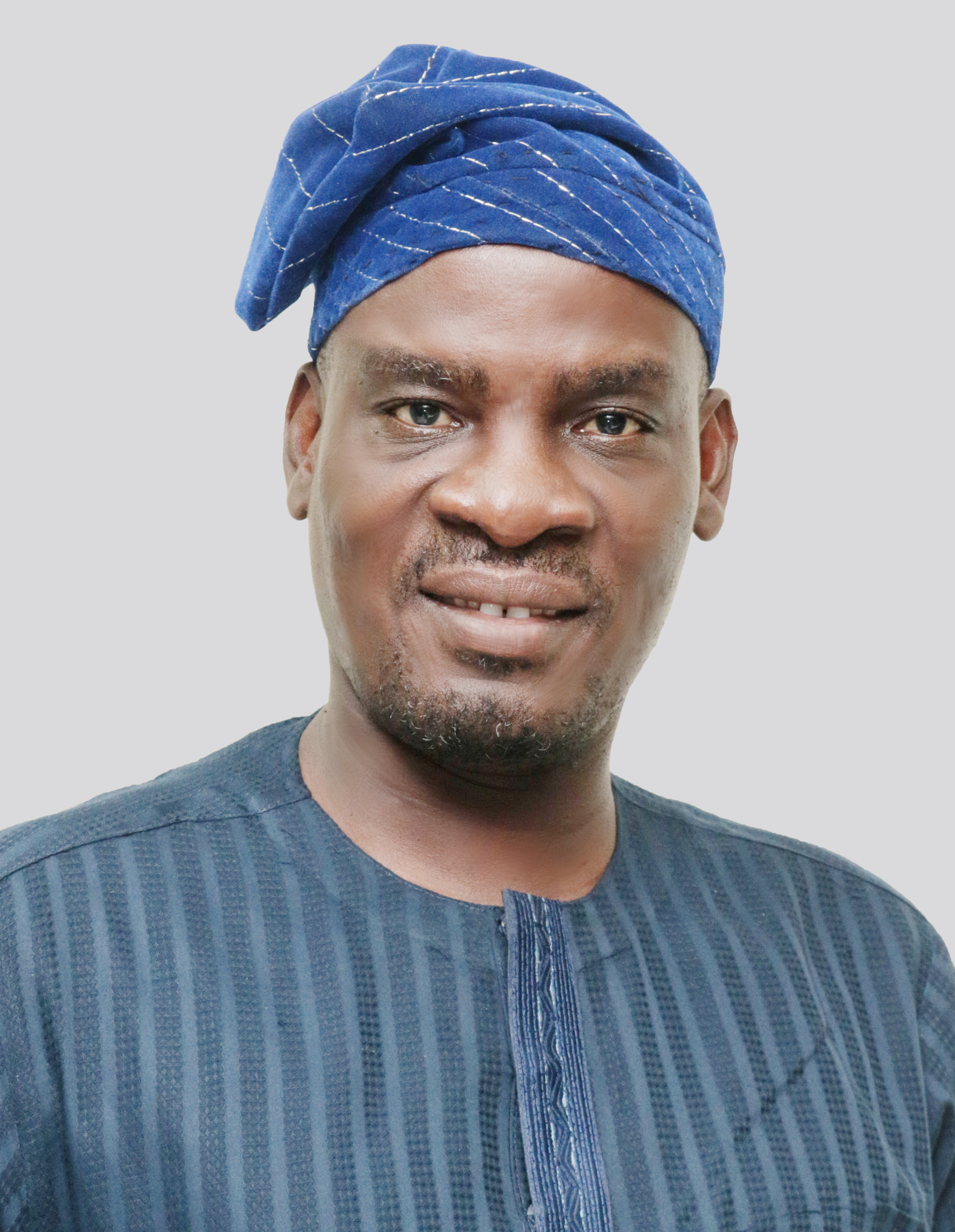
Haruna Iddrisu

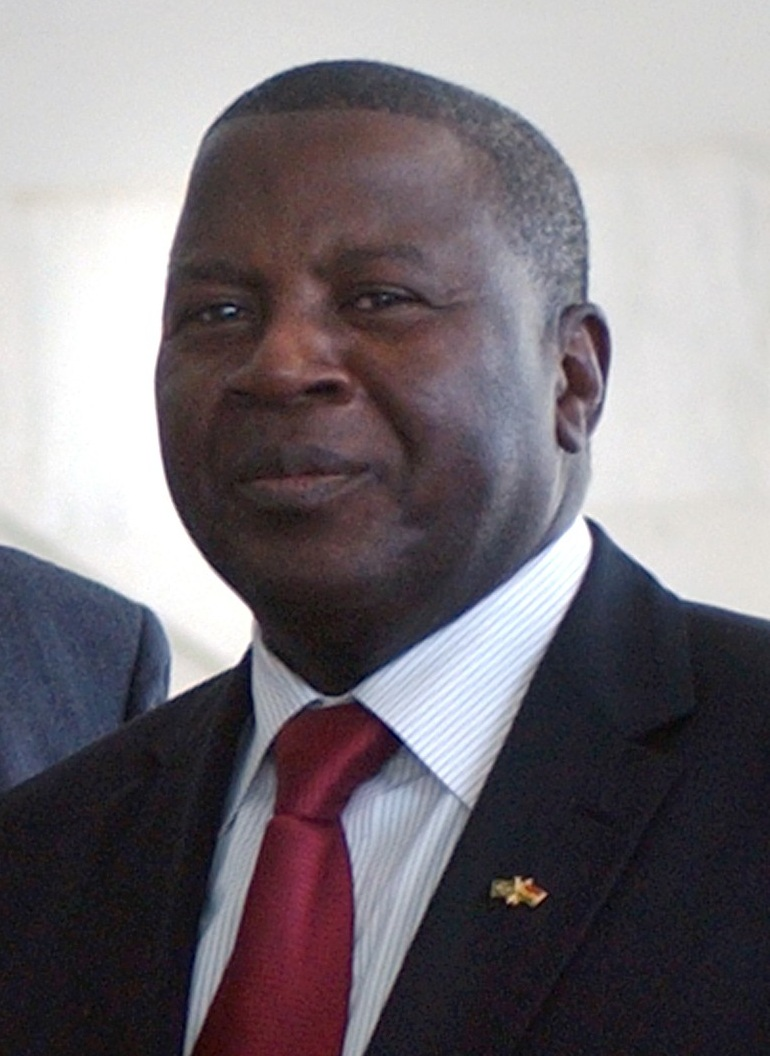
Aliu Mahama

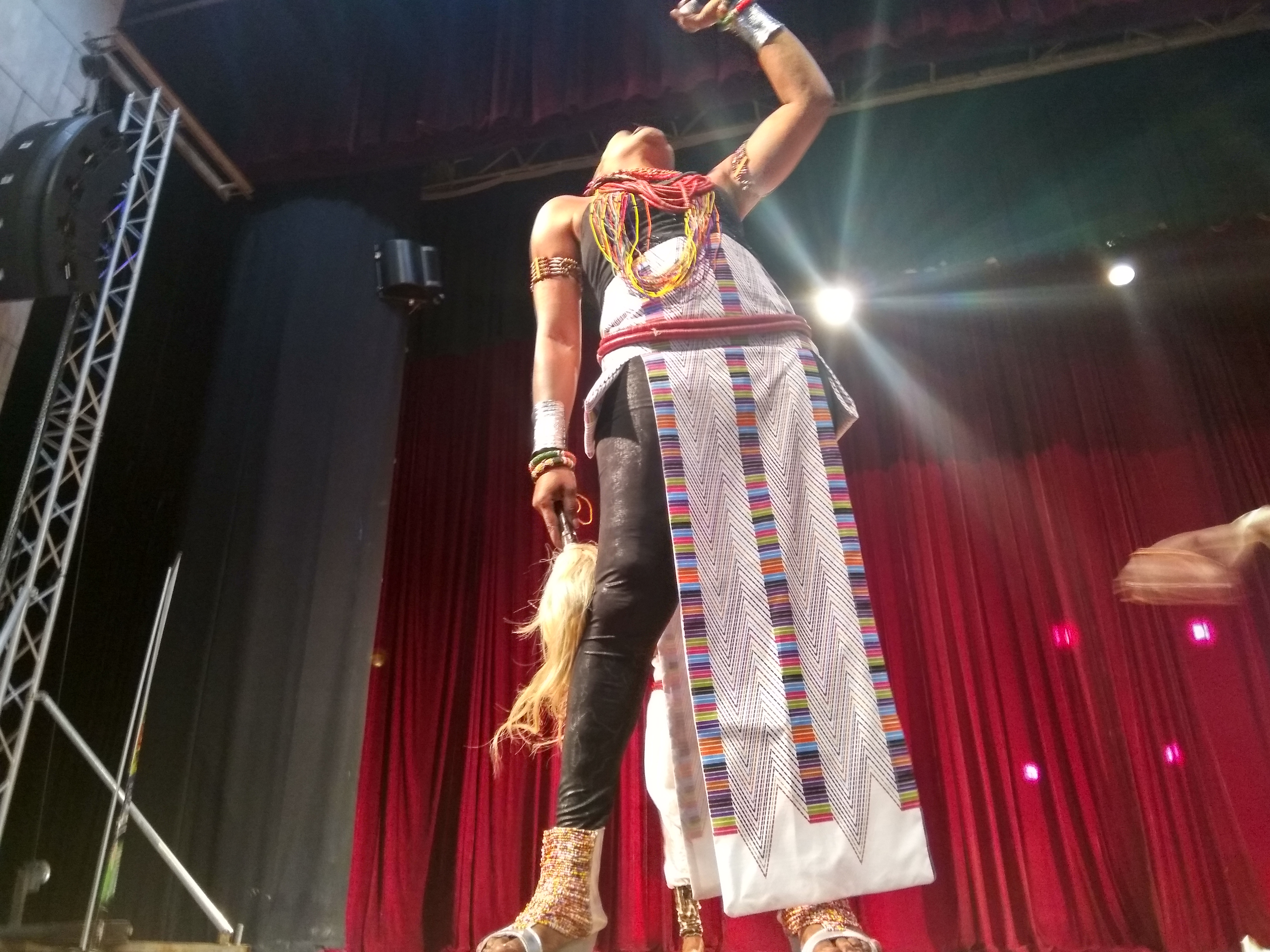
Sherifa Gunu

- Yakubu II - Former King of Dagbon
- Aliu Mahama - Former Vice President of Ghana from 2000 to 2008
- Haruna Yakubu - Former Vice Chancellor of University for Development Studies
- Haruna Iddrisu - Ghanaian politician
- Mubarak Wakaso - Ghanaian football player
- Abdul Fatawu Issahaku - Ghanaian football player
- Afa Ajura - Founder and leader of the Ahlus Sunnah wal Jamaa'a Islamic sect in Ghana
- Abdul Razak Alhassan - MMA fighter
- Fawaz Aliu
- Abibata Shanni Mahama
- Mohammed Amin Adam
- Hassan Tampuli
- Ibrahim Murtala Mohammed
- Habib Iddrisu
- Alhassan Suhuyini
- Farouk Aliu Mahama
- Abdul-Aziz Ayaba Musah

== See also ==
- List of people from Dagbon
- List of rulers of the Kingdom of Dagbon
- Dagbani language
- Moore language
- Bugum Chugu (Fire Festival in Dagbon)
- Mossi people
- Naming customs of the Dagomba people
