= Gbewaa Palace =

Royal home of the king of Dagbon kingdom

Coordinates: 9.44292°N 0.00143°W

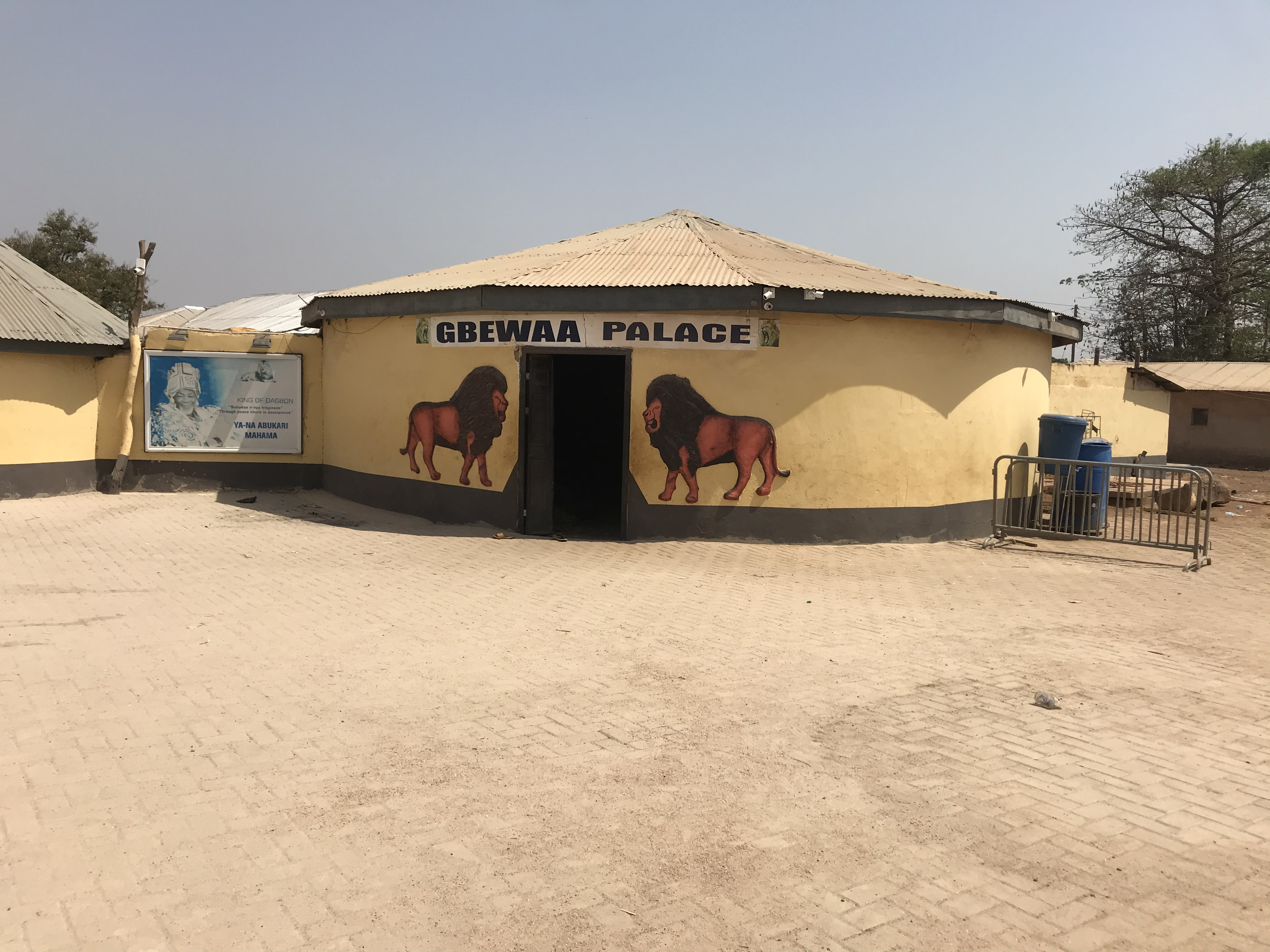
Gbewaa Palace

Gbewaa Palace is the seat of the Yaa Naa of the Kingdom of Dagbon. Located at Nayilifong along the Yendi-Saboba road in Yendi, Gbewaa Palace was named after the patriarch of the Mole-Dagbani people of Ghana. In 1896, The Gbewaa palace was burnt down and plundered during the German invasion of Dagbon. On March 4, 2023, Gariba II cut sod for the redevelopment of the palace.
