= Mahamadu IV =

King of Dagbon

Yaa Naa Mahamadu IV was the King of Dagbon, the traditional kingdom of the Dagomba people in northern Ghana, from 1969 to 1974. He is the great grand father of Ghanaian historian Muhib Dahala.
