= Sports in Omaha, Nebraska =

Sports in Omaha, Nebraska are supported by a high attendance at events and tax support from the City of Omaha. Omaha, Nebraska is home to several professional sports teams and modern sports venues.

The city has hosted a number of important sporting events. Since 1950 Omaha has hosted the baseball College World Series. The Cox Classic golf tournament was part of the second-level circuit now known as the Korn Ferry Tour from 1996 to 2013. The circuit returned to Omaha in 2017 with the Pinnacle Bank Championship.

Former sports clubs in Omaha include the USL Premier Development League's Flames soccer team; the American Association's Omaha Dodgers; two professional hockey teams, the Omaha Knights and the Omaha Ak-Sar-Ben Knights; a CBA Basketball Team, the Omaha Racers; and the United Football League's Omaha Nighthawks.

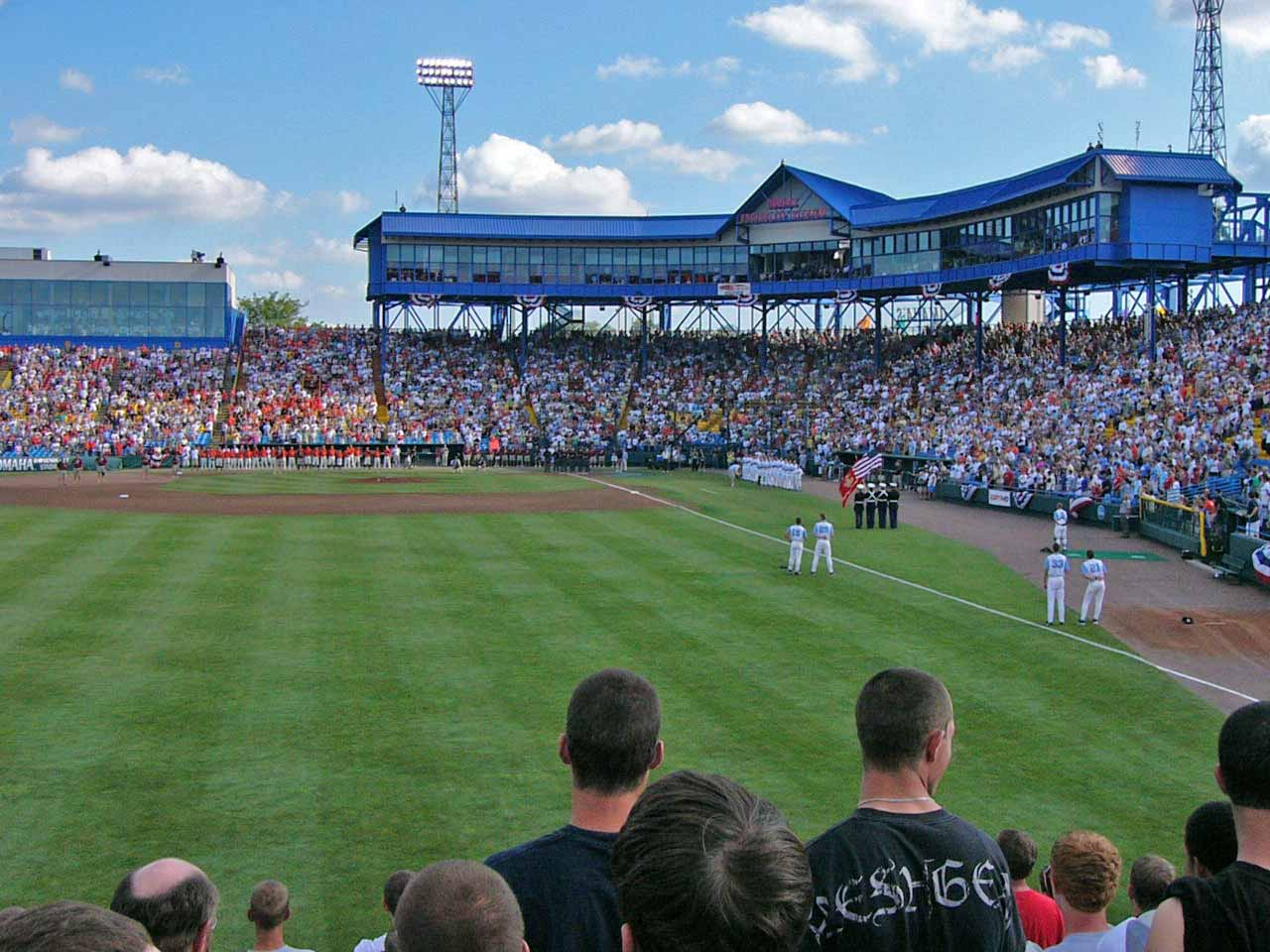
The 2006 College World Series Championship game at Rosenblatt Stadium.

== Sports ==
Several sports have heritage in Omaha. The American Taekwondo Association was founded by Haeng Ung Lee in Omaha in 1969. Alois P. Swoboda, the pioneer American physical culture at the turn of the 20th century. His revolutionary course "Conscious Evolution" inspired many American leaders in the fields of government, business, entertainment, law, athletics and medicine.

=== Basketball ===
In 1972 the Cincinnati Royals of the National Basketball Association moved to a new primary home in Kansas City and a secondary home in Omaha, carrying the name Kansas City-Omaha Kings, the only time in the history of Omaha that they were home to a major-league sports team, despite sharing it with Kansas City. The team ceased Omaha operations in 1975 and became known as just the Kansas City Kings.

From 1988 to 1997 the Omaha Racers of the CBA played at Ak-Sar-Ben winning the CBA league championship in 1993. The only number retired by the Racers was Tim Legler's number 23.

=== Cricket ===
- In 1991, the Omaha Cricket Club was formed. N.P. Dodge Park has been home of the Omaha Cricket Club since 2001. It was founded by Jamaican community with help of the Indian Diaspora.
- In 2010, the Cricket Association of Nebraska, a 501(c)4 non-profit organization was formed with their home ground at historic Freedom Park, Omaha. The Nebraska Cricket Club is the cricket-playing wing of CAN. Owing to the floods in 2012, they got their second field at the Hefflinger Park Cricket Field
- In 2011, the Simply Play Cricket Club was formed with their home at the Hefflinger Park Cricket Field, the tennis ball cricket enthusiasts now has the largest following in the metro area.
- In 2013, the University Of Nebraska Omaha Cricket Club was formed by the group of young cricket enthusiasts. The home ground for UNO Cricket club is the UNO Dome facility. The club has a history of representing the UNO at American College Cricket Nationals. As of 2019 July 31 the club is in inactive status.

=== Football ===
The Omaha Beef indoor football team has played at Ralston Arena since 2013; it previously played at the Omaha Civic Auditorium. The Omaha Nighthawks of the United Football League also began playing in 2010 at Rosenblatt Stadium, and at TD Ameritrade Park in 2011 until the league's folding in 2012. Omaha added a semi-pro team in 2015 named the Omaha Stockmen. The city received a women's team in the Legends Football League named the Omaha Heart in 2013.

=== Baseball ===
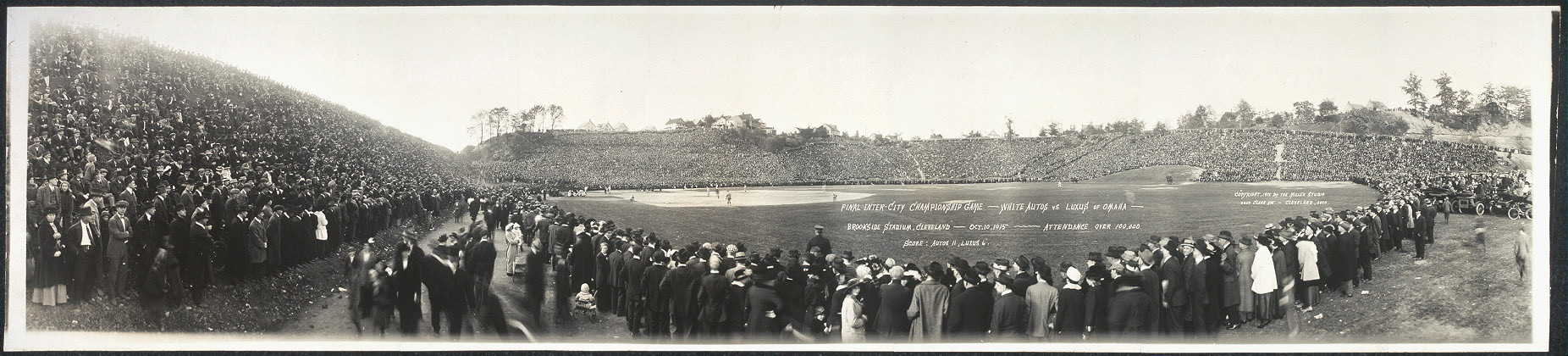
The Cleveland White Autos vs. Omaha Luxus in 1915.

An early team in Omaha was the Luxus, who played with support from the Krug Brewery, and in 1915 played for the Amateur World Championship.

The Omaha Omahogs was a baseball team started in 1900 as part of the new Western League. Their name changed to the Omaha Indians in 1902. In 1904 the team was fielded as the Omaha Packers, and in 1906 as the Omaha Rourkes. They kept that name until 1921, when the name changed to the Omaha Buffaloes, which stuck until 1928 when it changed to the Omaha Crickets. In 1930 the team changed its name back to the Omaha Packers, and kept that name until 1935, when they moved to Council Bluffs and subsequently folded. A new team called the Omaha Robin Hoods formed in 1936, but moved to Rock Island, Illinois late in the year. The team reformed shortly thereafter as the Omaha Cardinals, remaining as such for several years.

In the 1940s, the African American players of the Omaha Rockets independent baseball team lived in North Omaha. The team played exhibition games against Negro league teams from across the U.S., and was the home of several important players.

The Omaha Storm Chasers are the city's current minor-league baseball team. They are the AAA affiliate of the Kansas City Royals.

Baseball teams in Omaha
Years	Team name	League	Notes
1879	Omaha Green Stockings	Northwestern League	
1888	Omaha Lambs	Western Association	
1892–1901	Omaha Omahogs	Western League	
1902–1903	Omaha Indians	Western League	
1904	Omaha Rangers	Western League	
1905–1920	Omaha Rourkes	Western League	
1921–1927	Omaha Buffaloes	Western League	
1928–1929	Omaha Crickets	Western League	
1930–1935	Omaha Packers	Western League	
1936	Omaha Robin Hoods	Western League	
1947–1959	Omaha Cardinals	Western League	
1961–62	Omaha Dodgers	American Association	
1969–1998	Omaha Royals	American Association	
1999–2001	Omaha Golden Spikes	Pacific Coast League	
2002–2010	Omaha Royals	Pacific Coast League	
2011–	Omaha Storm Chasers	Pacific Coast League	

Omaha has served as host city of the College World Series—the final rounds of the NCAA Division I Baseball Championship, since 1950, initially at Johnny Rosenblatt Stadium, but now at Charles Schwab Field. In 2008, the NCAA reached a 25-year agreement with the local organizers to continue hosting the College World Series in Omaha through at least 2035.

=== Soccer ===
On May 1, 2019, the United Soccer League announced that Alliance Omaha Soccer Holdings, Omaha had been granted an expansion franchise in USL League One. The team's name was announced as Union Omaha on October 3, 2019. The club played their home games at Werner Park from 2020-2025, and moved to Morrison Stadium starting in 2026. Union Omaha were league champions in 2021 and 2024.

=== Hockey ===
Ice hockey is a popular spectator sport in Omaha. One of the current Omaha-area teams is the Omaha Lancers of the USHL. The Lancers started out in 1986 at Hitchcock ice arena before moving the now-demolished Ak-Sar-Ben, moved to Council Bluffs and the Mid-America Center in 2002, and the Omaha Civic Auditorium between the 2009–10 and 2011–12 seasons. Since 2012, the Lancers have played at the Ralston Arena in suburban Ralston.

The University of Nebraska Omaha Mavericks men's ice hockey team plays their home games at Baxter Arena, which opened for the 2015–16 season. Founded in 1997 and joining the Central Collegiate Hockey Association 2 years later, the Mavericks enjoy a loyal and vocal fan base. They currently play in the National Collegiate Hockey Conference and made their first-ever appearance in the Frozen Four, the semifinal round of the NCAA Division I hockey tournament, in 2015.

The Omaha Ak-Sar-Ben Knights were the AHL affiliate of the Calgary Flames. The Knights played their home games at the Civic Auditorium. Following the 2006–07 season the Knights were relocated to the Quad Cities due to mounting losses taken on by the Calgary organization, they were renamed the Quad City Flames and replaced the Quad City Mallards of the United Hockey League. The franchise's attendance in the Quad Cities was lower than it was in Omaha.

On February 9, 2013, at TD Ameritrade Park Omaha, two hockey games took place as part of the Mutual of Omaha Battles on Ice. In game 1, the Lancers took on the Lincoln Stars, while in game 2, the Mavericks battled the University of North Dakota.

=== Roller Derby ===
In 2006, Omaha Rollergirls played their first game at a roller rink called Skate Daze in Omaha. The team played there for years with two teams going head-to-head, the Victoria's Secret Service vs the Lowdown Lucys. The team began playing games at the Mid-America Center in Council Bluffs and was ranked 10th in the WFTDA Regional Ranking at season-end.

In 2012, the team played in the WFTDA "Landlocked Lace-Up" playoffs in Lincoln, NE. The team's two star jammers, Ima Firestarter #53 and Anna Maniac #999 played hard and helped the team to finish in 7th place, not taking them to championships that year.

In 2015, the Omaha Rollergirls hosted a part of WFTDA International Division 1 Playoffs at Ralston Arena, hosting top-level roller derby teams as they fought to qualify for the next round. In 2016, the team celebrated their 10th season. The Omaha Rollergirls began the 2016 season ranked 84th and finished at 74th out of over 400 teams worldwide.

In 2019, the Omaha Rollergirls rebranded to Omaha Roller Derby.

=== Indoor soccer ===
On August 18, 2010, the MISL announced on August 18, 2010, that it is expanding into Omaha starting with the 2010–11 season. The team, called Omaha Vipers, played at the Civic Auditorium but folded after the season when they were unable to secure an arena lease for the following season.

Omaha City Football Club started in 2016 and continue to compete in the Premier Arena Soccer League (PASL) the third tier in the Major Arena Soccer League System. They also compete in Major League Futsal (MLF). The Kings now play in the MLIS.

=== Wrestling ===
Martin Burns operated a successful wrestling school in Omaha in the 1910s. Joe Stecher, a wrestler from rural Nebraska, won national professional wrestling champion title in Omaha in 1915. The American Wrestling Association's Omaha version of their World Heavyweight Championship was a professional wrestling championship sanctioned by promoters in and around the city from 1957 through 1964.

Maurice "Mad Dog" Vachon, an early wrestling great, lived in Omaha until his death in 2013. Other wrestling figures, including Tony Osborne, Ted DiBiase, Paul "The Rapmaster" Neu, Sting and Baron von Raschke are originally from Omaha. The city is also notorious within the wrestling world for other reasons, including Chris Masters' 2005 claim that, "anywhere is better than Omaha, Nebraska", offering of $6000 for a plane ticket to anywhere else in the United States.

Omaha also hosted the WWE Judgment Day Pay-Per-View Event on May 18, 2008, which was held at the then-Qwest Center.

=== Volleyball ===
- Omaha Supernovas
- LOVB Nebraska (League One Volleyball)

=== College Sports ===
==== Creighton University ====
The Creighton Bluejays compete in a number of NCAA Division I sports. In July 2013, Creighton became an invited member of the Big East Conference after more than 35 years in the Missouri Valley Conference. The men's basketball team plays their home games at the CHI Health Center, while the women's basketball and volleyball teams play on campus at D. J. Sokol Arena. Their men's and women's soccer teams play their home games at Morrison Stadium.

The most popular team of the Creighton University athletic department is their men's basketball program. They have amassed 17 consecutive postseason appearances, including nine appearances in the NCAA tournament during that stretch. Overall, Creighton has 19 NCAA Tournament appearances.

During the 2018–19 season, Creighton ranked 8th in all of NCAA Division I basketball in average home game attendance, averaging 15,980 per game.

==== University of Nebraska Omaha ====
The Omaha Mavericks represent the University of Nebraska Omaha in NCAA Division I competition. They compete in the Summit League in all sports with the exception of ice hockey. The Mavericks hockey team became a charter member of the National Collegiate Hockey Conference in 2011, and left the Western Collegiate Hockey Association at the end of the 2012–13 season with NCHC play beginning the next season.

== Venues ==
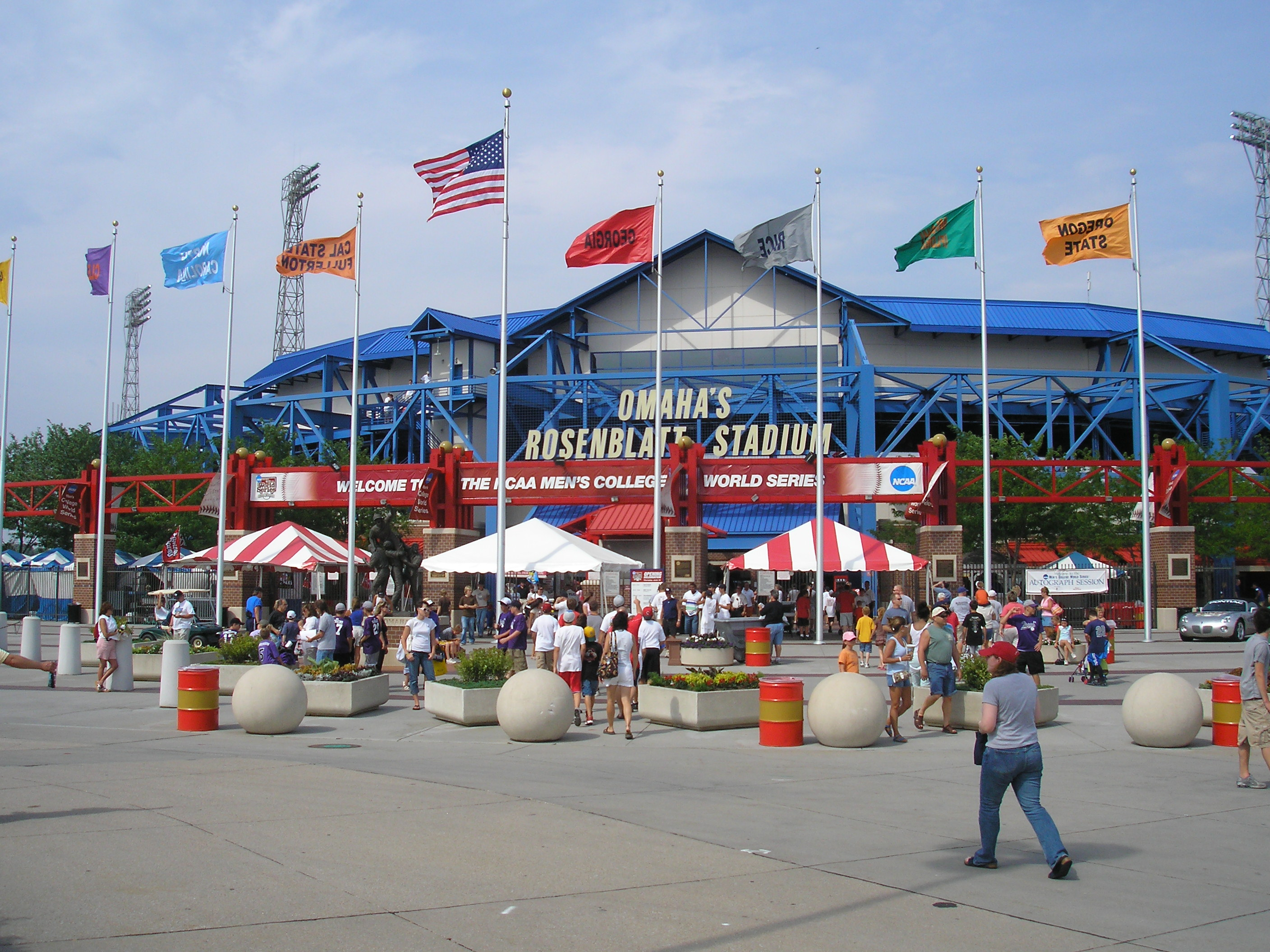
Main entrance to the Johnny Rosenblatt Stadium

Omaha's Johnny Rosenblatt Stadium was formerly home to the Omaha Royals, now known as the Omaha Storm Chasers. From 1950 to 2010, it also hosted the annual NCAA College World Series men's baseball tournament in mid-June.

Downtown Omaha and the Near North Side is home to the CHI Health Center and Creighton University.

Morrison Stadium is a 6,000-seat soccer-specific stadium located at 2500 California Plaza in the Near North Side neighborhood. The stadium is home to the Creighton Bluejays men's and women's soccer teams. Morrison Stadium also began hosting Union Omaha in 2026.

Al Caniglia Field originally opened in 1949, and was the long time home to the Omaha Mavericks football team. When the University discontinued the football team in 2011, the stadium was renovated and is now home to the Omaha men's and women's soccer teams.

The Omaha Civic Auditorium arena, which closed in 2014, seated up to 9,300 people for sporting events. In the past, the arena was home to the Creighton Bluejays men's basketball team, the University of Nebraska Omaha (UNO) ice hockey team, the Omaha Ak-Sar-Ben Knights American Hockey League team, the NBA's Kansas City–Omaha Kings basketball team, the Omaha Beef indoor football team and the Omaha Lancers junior hockey team. The arena was the site of the Missouri Valley Conference men's basketball tournament title game in 1978 and 1981. It was also the site of the seventh WWF In Your House pay-per-view in 1996. The closure of the Auditorium temporarily left the Omaha area without a mid-sized indoor venue, a void filled with the October 2015 opening of UNO's Baxter Arena.

Today the CHI Health Center in downtown Omaha hosts Creighton men's basketball and the Nebraska School Activities Association Nebraska State Wrestling Tournament annually. In 2008 the arena, then known as Qwest Center, hosted the First and Second Rounds of the NCAA tournament, WWE Judgment Day 2008 and the USA Swimming Summer Olympic Trials. The venue again hosted the Olympic swimming trials in 2012 and 2016 under its second name, CenturyLink Center Omaha. The facility also hosted UNO's ice hockey team, the Omaha Mavericks, before the opening of Baxter Arena.

In 2009, the Creighton women's basketball and volleyball teams left the Civic Auditorium and moved back to campus with the opening of D. J. Sokol Arena.

Two new baseball parks opened in the Omaha area within days of each other in April 2011. On January 21, 2009 Omaha Mayor Mike Fahey along with others broke ground on the new Omaha Baseball Stadium, which would later be named TD Ameritrade Park Omaha. This stadium, located in downtown Omaha, has a permanent capacity of 24,000, with the capability of expansion to 35,000 with temporary seating. Since its opening, it has been home of the College World Series, and is also home to Creighton's baseball program. The Royals initially planned to move into this stadium, but eventually decided that it was too large for their needs. They instead chose to build a smaller stadium, ultimately named Werner Park, in the suburb of Papillion, which also houses select games for Omaha Mavericks baseball annually and was the home of the Union Omaha soccer team from 2020-2025. Following the 2010 season, the Royals changed their name to the Storm Chasers. The Omaha Mavericks baseball team opened their new home, Tal Anderson Field in 2020.

Ralston Arena opened in October 2012 in Ralston, a suburb of Omaha. It serves as the home of the Omaha Beef indoor football team, the Omaha Lancers junior hockey team, and was also home to Omaha Mavericks men's basketball from its opening through the 2014–15 season, after which that team moved into Baxter Arena. The UNO women's team continued to play on campus at Lee & Helene Sapp Fieldhouse, the former home of the men's team, until it also moved into Baxter Arena in 2015–16. Sapp Fieldhouse continues to serve as a part-time home for Mavericks women's volleyball alongside Baxter Arena.

Sports venues in the Omaha area
Venue	Sport(s)	Location	Description	Opened	Closed
Johnny Rosenblatt Stadium	Baseball, Football	South 10th Street	The MiLB's baseball stadium. Host of the College World Series from 1950 to 2010, home of the Omaha Nighthawks UFL team in 2010. Home of the Omaha Royals from 1969-2010. Demolished in 2011 to accommodate expansion of the adjacent Henry Doorly Zoo.	1948	2010
Omaha Civic Auditorium	Basketball, football, hockey, volleyball	Downtown	Multi-purpose arena, concert hall, and convention centre. Notable users include the Kansas City-Omaha Kings, Omaha Beef, and Ak-Sar-Ben Knights. Demolished in 2014 after being replaced by the Qwest Center.	1954	2014
Morrison Stadium	Soccer	NoDo	6,000 seat soccer stadium serving as the home ground for Creighton Bluejays soccer and Union Omaha.	2003	
CHI Health Center	Basketball, hockey, rodeo, swimming, wrestling	NoDo	Arena and convention center operated by MECA. Originally the Qwest Center; first renamed July 15, 2011, following the purchase of Qwest by CenturyLink. Received its current name on September 1, 2018, when a new naming deal with CHI Health took effect. Host of the 2008, 2012, and 2016 US Olympic Swimming Team Trials. Notable tenants include Creighton men's basketball and Omaha Mavericks hockey until 2015.	2003	
Al Caniglia Field	Soccer	UNO campus	Hosted the Omaha Maverick football team from 1949-2011, it was renovated in 2013 and has since been the home to Omaha soccer.	1949	
D. J. Sokol Arena	Basketball, volleyball	Creighton campus	2,500 seat arena on the Creighton campus. Home of Bluejays women's basketball and women's volleyball. Also used as a practice facility for other Cregihton teams, and occasionally hosts high school games.	2009	
Charles Schwab Field Omaha	Baseball	NoDo	Baseball stadium purpose-built for the College World Series. Other tenants include the Creighton Baseball, and defunct football teams the Omaha Nighthawks and Omaha Mammoths. Originally called TD Ameritrade Park.	2011	
Werner Park	Baseball	Papillion	Built for the Omaha Storm Chasers after the closure of Rosenblatt stadium.	2011	
Lee & Helene Sapp Fieldhouse	Basketball, volleyball	UNO north campus	3,500 seat arena located on the University of Nebraska Omaha north campus, opened in 1950. Serves as a practice and occasional competition facility of many Mavericks teams.	1950	
Liberty First Credit Union Arena	Basketball, football	Ralston	4,000 seat arena located in the suburb of Ralston, and originally called The Ralston Arena. Home of the Omaha Lancers, Omaha Beef, and Omaha Rollergirls.	2012	
Baxter Arena	Basketball, curling, hockey, volleyball	Midtown	Arena owned and operated by The University of Nebraska Omaha. Full-time home for Omaha Mavericks men's ice hockey and men's and women's basketball, and part-time home for women's volleyball. Includes a second ice rink open to the public, and used as a hockey and curling practice facility.	2014	
Tal Anderson Field	Baseball, Softball	Midtown	Became the home to The University of Nebraska Omaha baseball and softball teams in 2020.	2020	

== Notable athletes ==
Omaha is home to numerous important historical and modern sports figures. They include:

- Houston Alexander, UFC light heavyweight contender
- Max Baer, Professional Boxer
- Bob Boozer, former National Basketball Association player and gold medalist at the 1960 Summer Olympics.
- Steve Borden, professional wrestler better known as Sting
- Carmen Butler, current Dallas Cowboys Cheerleader
- Lance Cade, professional wrestler
- Jason Christiansen, professional baseball player
- Terence Crawford, professional boxer
- Eric Crouch, 2001 Heisman Trophy winner for University of Nebraska
- Brian Deegan, FMX Rider
- Ted DiBiase, Professional Wrestler
- Bob Gibson, Hall of Fame pitcher for the St. Louis Cardinals
- Ahman Green, professional football player
- Kenton Keith, professional football player
- Nile Kinnick, 1939 Heisman Trophy winner for the University of Iowa
- Jason Kreis, former professional soccer player, current manager of the MLS club New York City FC
- Scott Munter, relief pitcher for the San Francisco Giants
- Dave Nelson, professional skateboarder
- Gregg Olson, professional baseball player, 1989 American League Rookie of the Year
- Jed Ortmeyer, professional ice hockey player
- Ron Prince, former head football coach at Kansas State University
- Andy Roddick, professional tennis player
- Johnny Rodgers, 1972 Heisman Trophy Winner, College Football Hall of Fame; Inductee and voted University of Nebraska's "player of the century".
- Gale Sayers, professional football player, Pro Football Hall of Fame inductee
- Scott Sutton, Oral Roberts University men's basketball coach
- Duncan McGuire, professional soccer player for Orlando City SC and the USMNT
- Danny Mayer, professional skateboarder
- Dipali, Professional Cricketer
- Marlin Briscoe, professional football player, College Football Hall of Fame

== See also ==
- Sports in Nebraska
- Parks in Omaha, Nebraska
