= Yendi Dabari Archeological Site =

== Background and geography ==
The Yendi (Yani) Dabari archeological site is an important archeological evidence source in northern Ghana. The site was excavated by Peter Shinnie and Paul Ozanne in 1961 under sponsorship from the Ghana Volta Lake Project Fund which aimed to collect, catalogue, and preserve important archeological data and heritage for communities under the Volta Basin Research Project. Yendi (Yani) Dabari lies close to the present-day village of Tunaayili about 45 minutes north of Tamale Airport on the Tamale-Bolga Road. It was the capital of the Dagbon Kingdom until about the 1660s. The site is about 4 or 5 kilometres east of the White Volta which passes at nearby Dipali. Yendi (Yani) Dabari is part of the older Dagbon complex of ancient settlements which had compact population groups. The area includes such communities as Diare, Gushei, Yoogu, Gbang, Dissiga, Dipali, Nambagla and Zoosali all in the Savelugu Municipality in present-day Northern Region. In a sense, this zone can be properly called original Dagbon due to its more homogenous, compact ethnic and dialectic heritage which are slightly different from eastern Dagbon's mixed-ethnic solidarity. The Ya-Naa is the king of Dagbon with his seat at present-day Yendi which is different from the Yendi Dabari. So, Yendi/Yani Dabari is an eponymic for the new Yendi where sits the Ya-Naa today.

== Excavations and findings ==
In 1961, the research team started work in February during the harmattan season. The site consisted of mounds scattered over a wide area. The mounds were dug in organized squares. Each mound was composed largely of hard laterite, and it was constructed from the same materials in the surrounding environment. This made the walls of laterite fragile as they easily collapsed. The hard laterite also made digging difficult. In the North-East was a higher mound initially believed to be an ancient burial ground, though that was not so after digging. The excavations show the site was composed of two storeys building with rectangular, narrow rooms. Walls were found surrounding the enclosure. Many of the mounds at Yendi (Yani) Dabari remain unexcavated after 1961.

Findings from the Yendi (Yani) Dabari include many material resources at the early Dagbon State's seat of power. They include:

a. Tobacco pipes

b. Vases, bowls and jars

c. Charred timber from collapsed roofs

The site provides interesting insight into the early Dagbon state. The evidence shows that everyday material culture in Yani Dabari connected with the larger Kintampo complex and even further through similarities in artefacts with other sites. Later works at Jakpasere in Gonja highlight exchange links between Ndewura Jakpa's capital, Jakpasere, and Yani Dabari. Proximate states, polities and people in the savannah during ancient times like Dagbon, Gonja, and the Bono principalities shared material, technical, and ideational traditions.
