= Savelugu-Nanton Municipal District =

- Former Municipal District
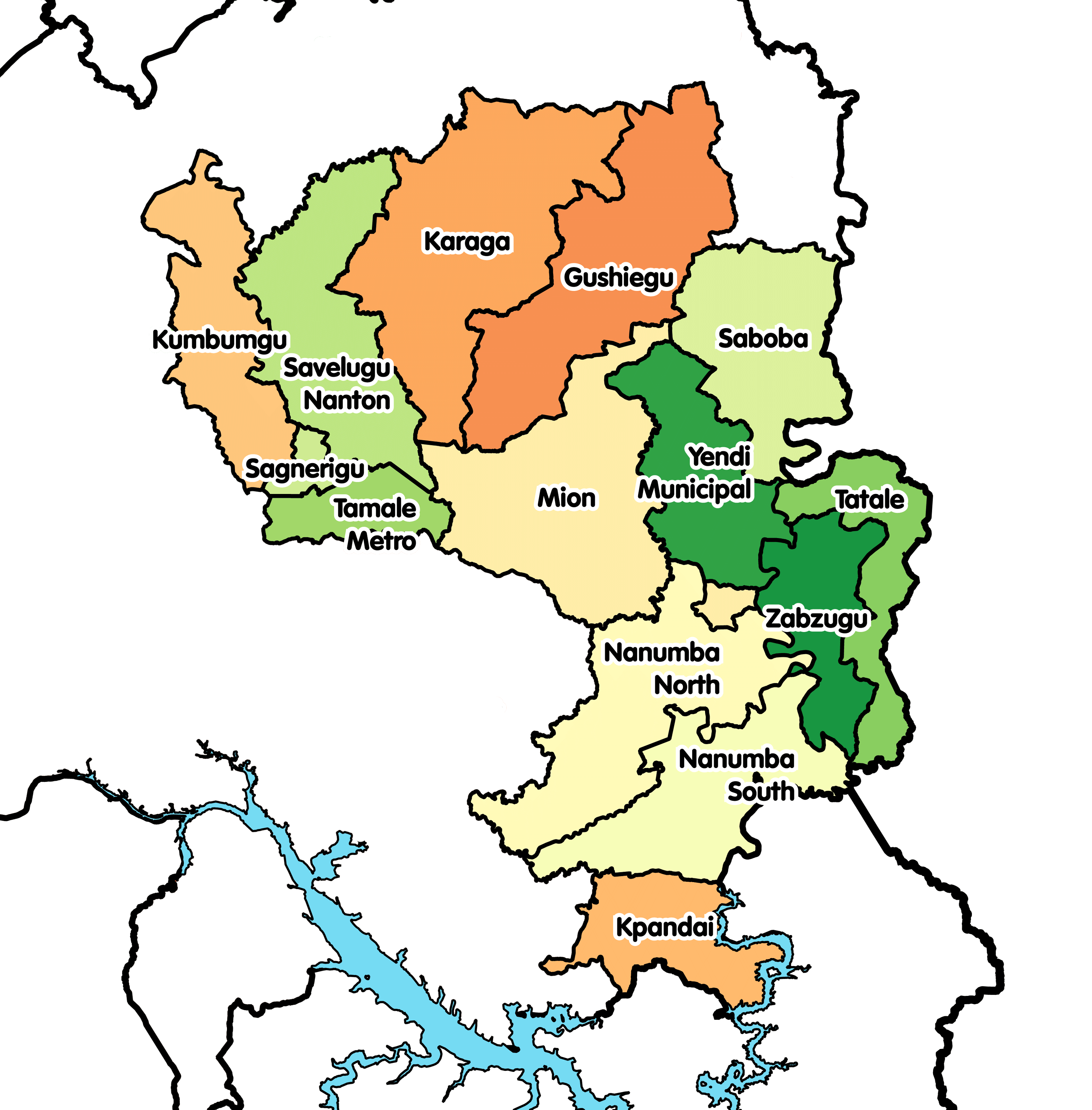
- Districts of Northern Region

- Location of Savelugu-Nanton Municipal District within Northern
- Coordinates: 9°37′26.4″N 0°49′40.8″W
- Country: Ghana
- Region: Northern
- Capital: Savelugu

Government
  - District Executive: Abdullah Red

Area
  - Total: 1,790 km^{2} (690 sq mi)
- Time zone: UTC+0 (GMT)
- ISO 3166 code: GH-NP-SN

Savelugu-Nanton Municipal District is a former district that was located in Northern Region, Ghana. Originally created as an ordinary district assembly in 1988; which was created from the former West Dagomba District Council. It was later elevated to municipal district assembly status on 1 March 2012. However on 28 June 2012, it was split off into two new districts: Savelugu Municipal District (capital: Savelugu) and Nanton District (capital: Nanton). The municipality was located in the eastern part of Northern Region and had Nanton as its capital town.

== Background ==
Savelugu-Nanton Municipal District had 149 communities, of which five were area councils, aside Savelugu being the capital. The area councils were Nanton, Pong-Tamale, Diare, Moglaa and Tampion. The population of this district according to the 2000 population census was 91,415 having a growth rate of 3%. 109,442 was the projected population as at March 2006 with its breakdown being 49% male and 51% female with a land area of 1790.7 km^{2}.

== Localities ==
- Damdu
- Gushee
- Jena Kpeng
- Kadia
- Naabogu
- Nyeko Ghana
- Zoosali
- Diyari
