= Gushee (name) =

Family name

Gushee is a family name. Notable people with this name include:

- David P. Gushee (born 1962), American ethicist
- Lawrence Gushee (1931–2015), American musicologist
- Vera Gushee (1894–1937), American astronomer, professor at Smith College
- Residents of the Gushee Family House, a 19th-century home in Appleton, Maine

== See also ==
- Gushee, a community in Northern Ghana
