= Alhassan Yahaya Seini =

Ghanaian Lawyer

Alhassan Yahaya Seini is a Ghanaian lawyer, and the former executive director and chairman of the legal aid scheme.

== Education ==
Seini obtained a Bachelor of Laws degree from the University of Ghana in 1981 and qualified as a barrister at the Ghana Law School. He is also a member of the Ghana Bar Association.

== Occupation ==
Seini has worked as a research assistant at the institute of Statistical, Social and Economic Research at the University of Ghana in 1977. He was also the northern regional chairman of the national investigations committee from 1984 to 1990. Seini was a senior partner in law practice at Yelinzo Chambers from 1991. He was an Assistant Director at the Northern Region Legal Aid Scheme from 1996. He later became the Executive Director of the Legal Aid Commission.

== Personal life ==
Seini is from Tamale in the Northern Region of Ghana.
