= Johnny Rosenblatt Stadium =

Former baseball park in Omaha, Nebraska, U.S.

- The Blatt
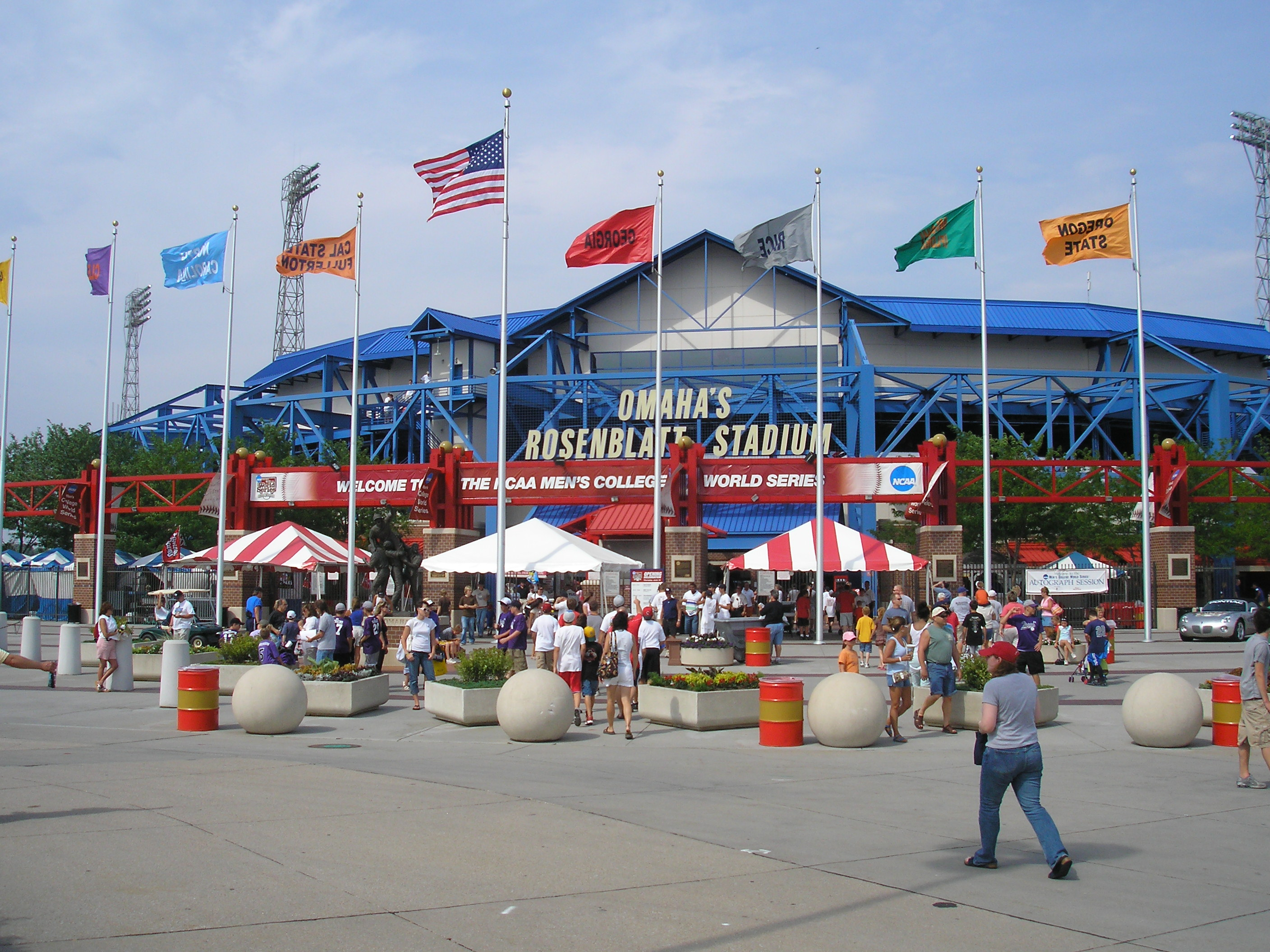
- Johnny Rosenblatt Stadium in 2006
- Interactive map of Johnny Rosenblatt Stadium
- Former names: Omaha Municipal Stadium (1947–1964)
- Address: 1202 Bert Murphy Avenue
- Location: Omaha, Nebraska, U.S.
- Coordinates: 41°13′33″N 95°55′52″W
- Elevation: 1,150 ft (350 m) AMSL
- Owner: Henry Doorly Zoo and Aquarium
- Capacity: 23,145 (CWS); 8,859 (Royals); 24,000 (Nighthawks)
- Surface: Grass
- Scoreboard: Yes
- Field size: Left Field – 335 ft (102 m); Left-Center – 375 ft (114 m); Center – 408 ft (124 m); Right-Center – 375 ft (114 m); Right Field – 335 ft (102 m); Fence height Left and Right Fields – 10 ft (3.0 m); Center Field – 12 ft (3.7 m)

Construction
- Groundbreaking: 1947; 79 years ago
- Opened: 1948; 78 years ago
- Closed: 2010; 16 years ago
- Demolished: July 25, 2012 to June 7, 2013; 13 years ago
- Architect: Leo A Daly
- General contractor: Peter Kiewit Company

Tenants
- Omaha Cardinals (WL / AA) (1949–1959); Omaha Dodgers (AA) (1961–1962); Omaha Mustangs (PFLA/CoFL/TFL) (1965–1970); Omaha Royals (AA / PCL) (1969–2010); Creighton Bluejays men's soccer (1980–1986); Omaha Nighthawks (UFL) (2010)

Johnny Rosenblatt Stadium was a baseball stadium in Omaha, Nebraska, United States. It was the former home to the annual NCAA Division I College World Series and the Triple-A Omaha Royals (now Storm Chasers). It was the largest minor league ballpark in the United States until its demolition (Sahlen Field in Buffalo now holds the distinction).

The final College World Series game at Rosenblatt Stadium was played on June 28, 2010 with the South Carolina Gamecocks winning the College World Series. The final game for the Royals in the stadium, and under the Royals name, was played on September 2, with the Royals defeating the Round Rock Express. The Omaha Nighthawks played their 2010 season at Rosenblatt.

Following those events, Rosenblatt was replaced by Charles Schwab Field Omaha. Rosenblatt Stadium began renovation in late July after being reopened during the 2012 College World Series for fans to visit again. The pressbox girders were imploded on the morning of August 22, 2012. Re-construction of Rosenblatt in playground-esque form began in March 2013, and was officially opened by Mayor Jim Suttle on June 7, 2013. The site is currently owned by the adjacent Henry Doorly Zoo and Aquarium.

== History ==
=== Background and construction ===
Johnny Rosenblatt Stadium originally began development in 1944 as the Omaha Municipal Stadium. The stadium was developed by the Municipal Stadium Committee, with then-Omaha mayor Johnny Rosenblatt as chairman. It was built to replace the former Vinton Street Park, which was destroyed by fire in 1936. A site near the now-Henry Doorly Zoo was chosen for construction, and by 1945, plans were approved by the city of Omaha. Designed by Leo A. Daly architects and built by the Peter Kiewit Company construction began in 1947.

Construction was halted following a structural steel supply shortage. This delayed the stadiums opening by a year. Opening was again delayed after vandals broke in and caused extensive damage to the sod, causing the sod to be replaced. The Omaha Municipal Stadium officially opened with an inaugural game on October 17, 1948. The following year, the Omaha Cardinals became the first team to make it its home stadium. In 1950, the College World Series was moved to the stadium. The stadium was later re-named for Rosenblatt, with it officially being dedicated as the Johnny Rosenblatt Stadium in May 1964.

=== Closure and demolition ===
By 2007, Rosenblatt Stadium's condition had been described as "rickety". The stadium was also described as too small, and while renovations and expansions were considered, they were described as too expensive when compared to new construction. The National Collegiate Athletic Association, the organizer of the College World Series, itself favored a new stadium. Local organizers decided that in order to renew the expired contract, a new stadium would be built.

However, said decision came under widespread opposition from many of Rosenblatt's fans. The Save Rosenblatt Committee was formed in 2007 to renovate the stadium to keep it as the host of the College World Series. However, said plans were rejected by the NCAA. Rosenblatt held its final College World Series game in 2010. It was succeeded by TD Ameritrade Park and Werner Park, both of which opened the following year.

In 2011, Omaha's Henry Doorly Zoo and Aquarium purchased the site and planned on turning it into a parking lot for the zoo. The field was opened in June 2012 for visitors attending the College World Series. Demolition began the following month, with the press box being imploded in August 2012. Demolition was completed in June 2013, with a mini-ballpark, known as Memorial to Rosenblatt, opening that same month.

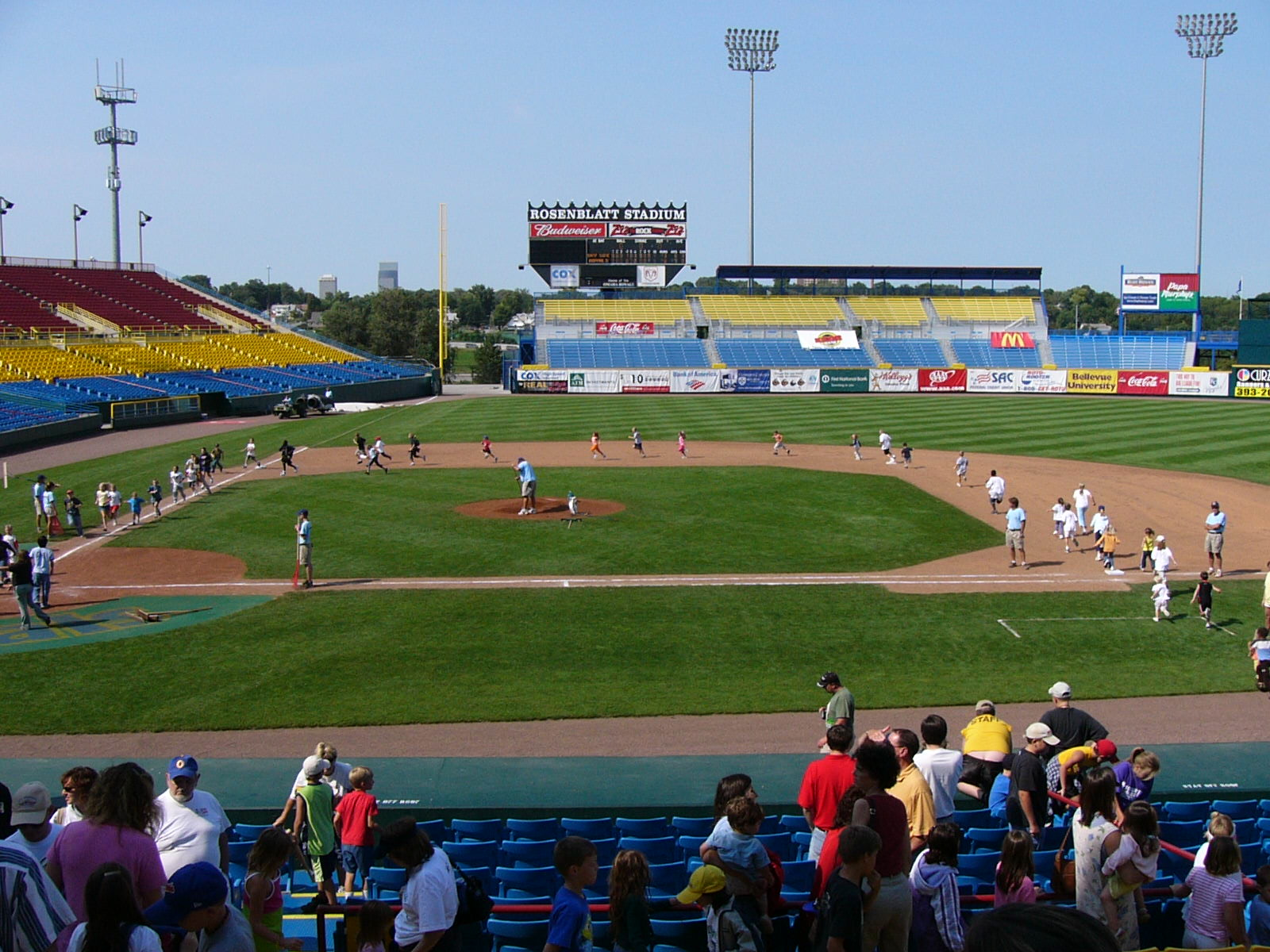
Kids running the bases during an Omaha Royals baseball game at Rosenblatt Stadium in August 2004

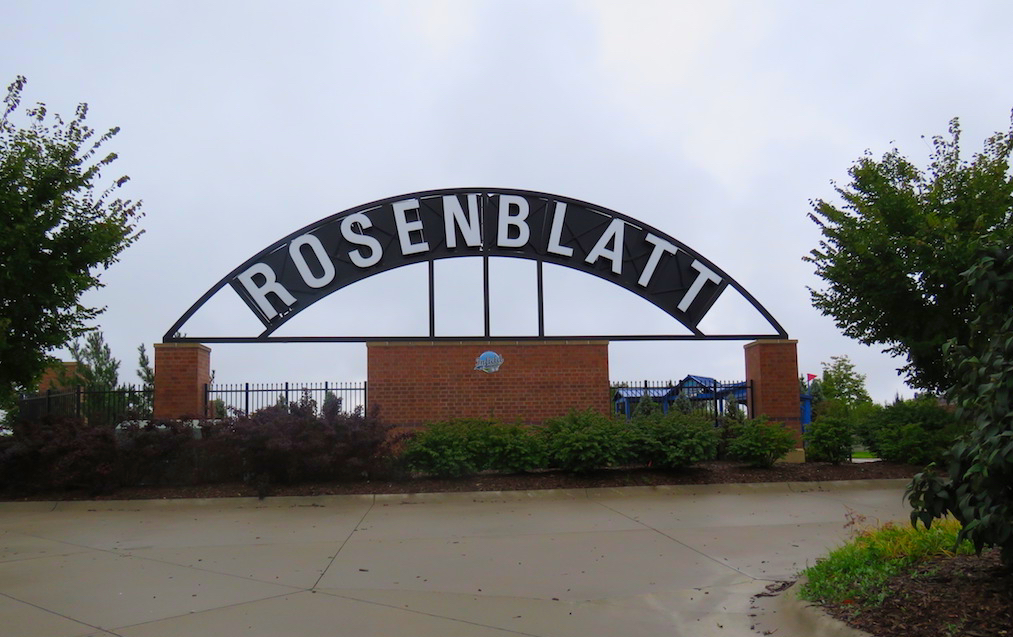
Memorial to Rosenblatt in 2018

== Usage ==
Johnny Rosenblatt Stadium was used by the Omaha Cardinals, Omaha Dodgers, Omaha Mustangs, the Omaha Royals, Creighton Bluejays men's soccer, and the Omaha Nighthawks. Rosenblatt was also used by the National Collegiate Athletic Association to host the College World Series.

Seasons	Team	League	Class	MLB Affiliate
1949–1954	Omaha Cardinals	Western	A	St. Louis Cardinals
1955–1959	Omaha Cardinals	American Assn.	AAA	St. Louis Cardinals
1961–1962	Omaha Dodgers	American Assn.	AAA	Los Angeles Dodgers
1969–2010	Omaha Royals	Amer. Assn. – PCL	AAA	Kansas City Royals

== Design ==
Johnny Rosenblatt Stadium was a minor league ballpark located in South Omaha, Nebraska, United States. It was designed by Leo A. Daly and was built by Kiewit Corporation. The field was aligned northeast (home plate to center field) at an approximate elevation of 1,150 feet (350 m) above sea level, nearly 200 feet (60 m) above the Missouri River. The foul lines were 335 ft (102 m), the power alleys were 375 ft (114 m), and center field was 408 ft (124 m). Before its demolition, it was the largest minor league ballpark in the United States. Sahlen Field in Buffalo, New York now holds the distinction.

== Gallery ==
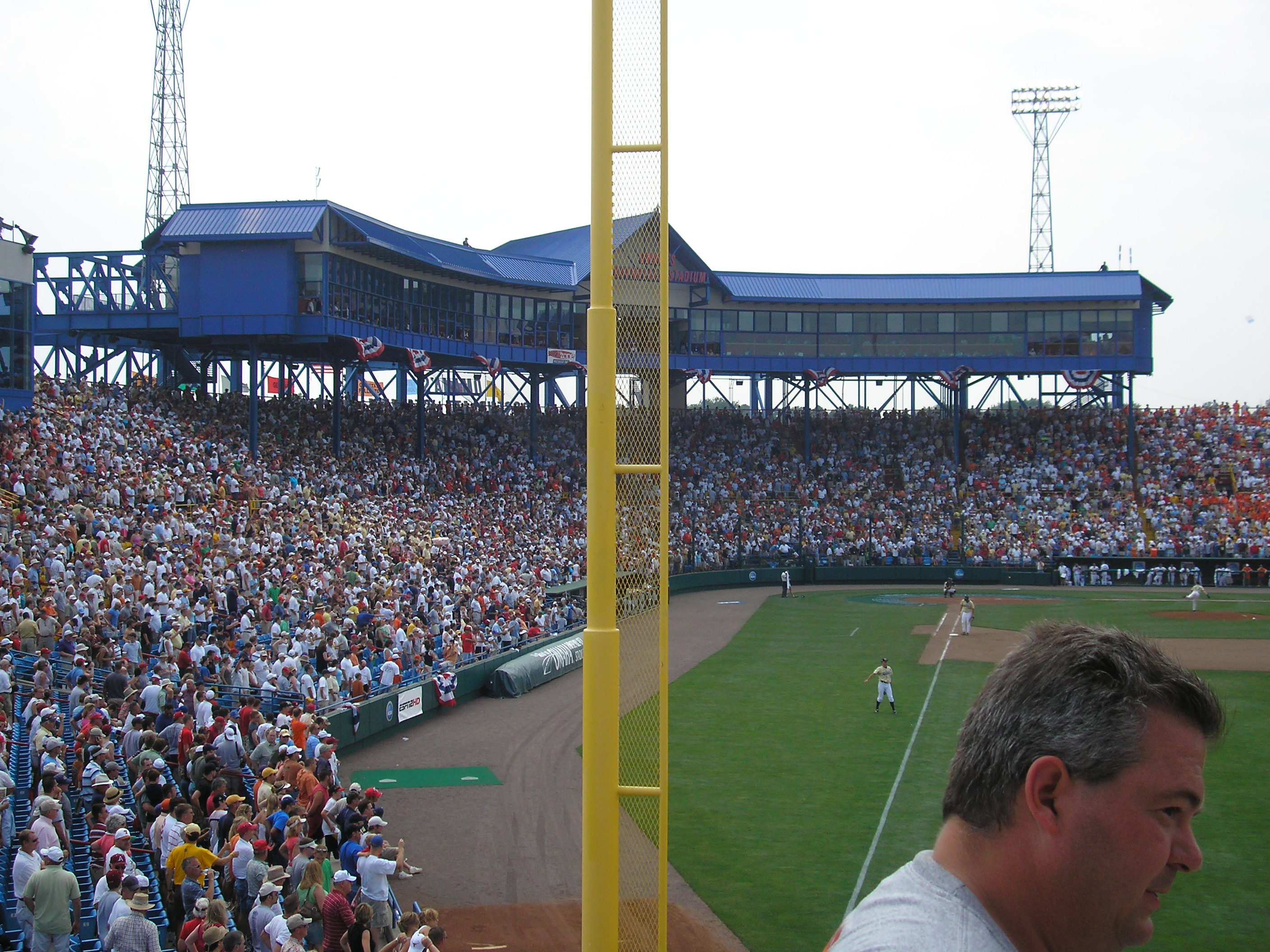
First baseline Rosenblatt Stadium

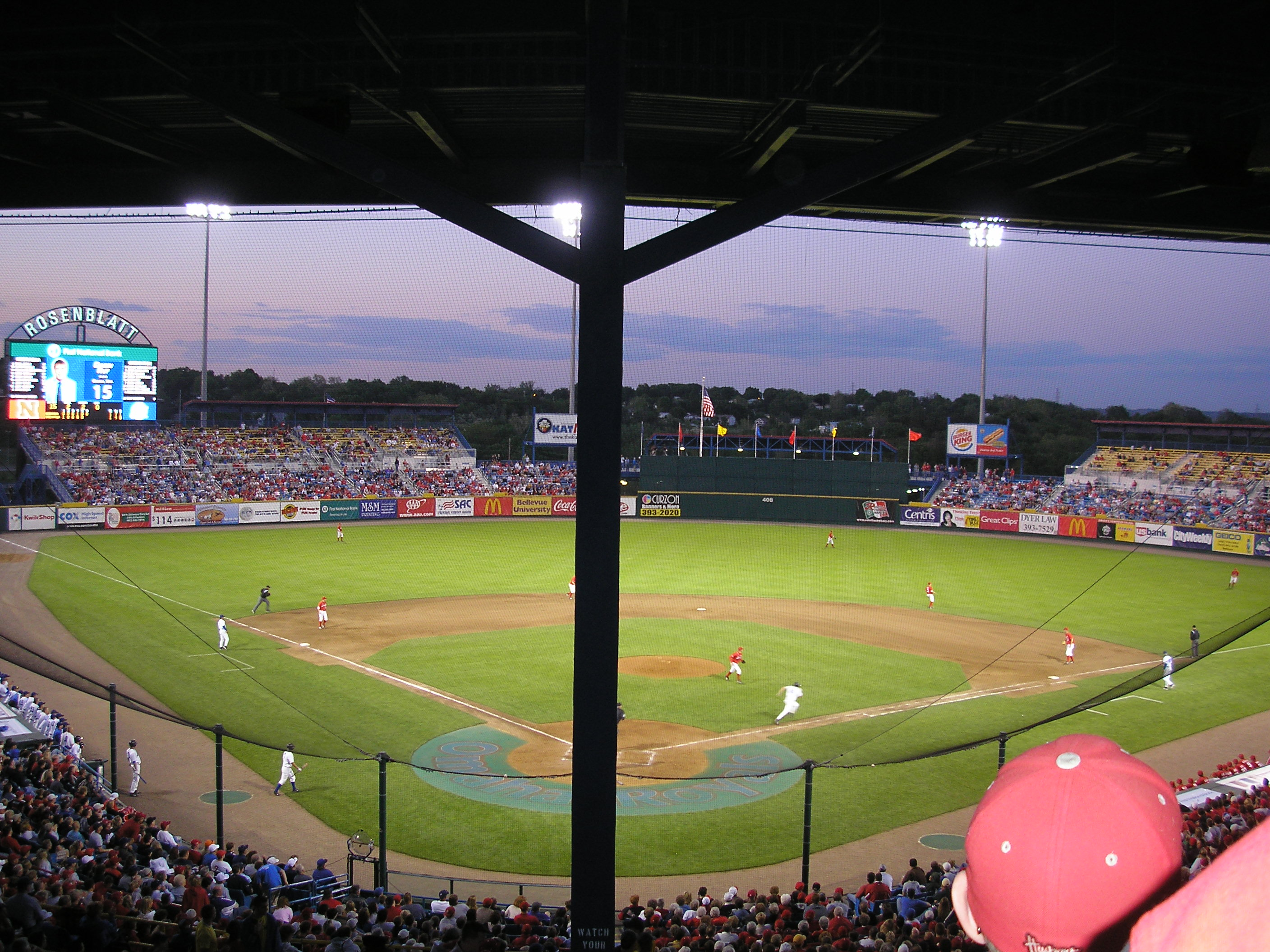
Rosenblatt Stadium

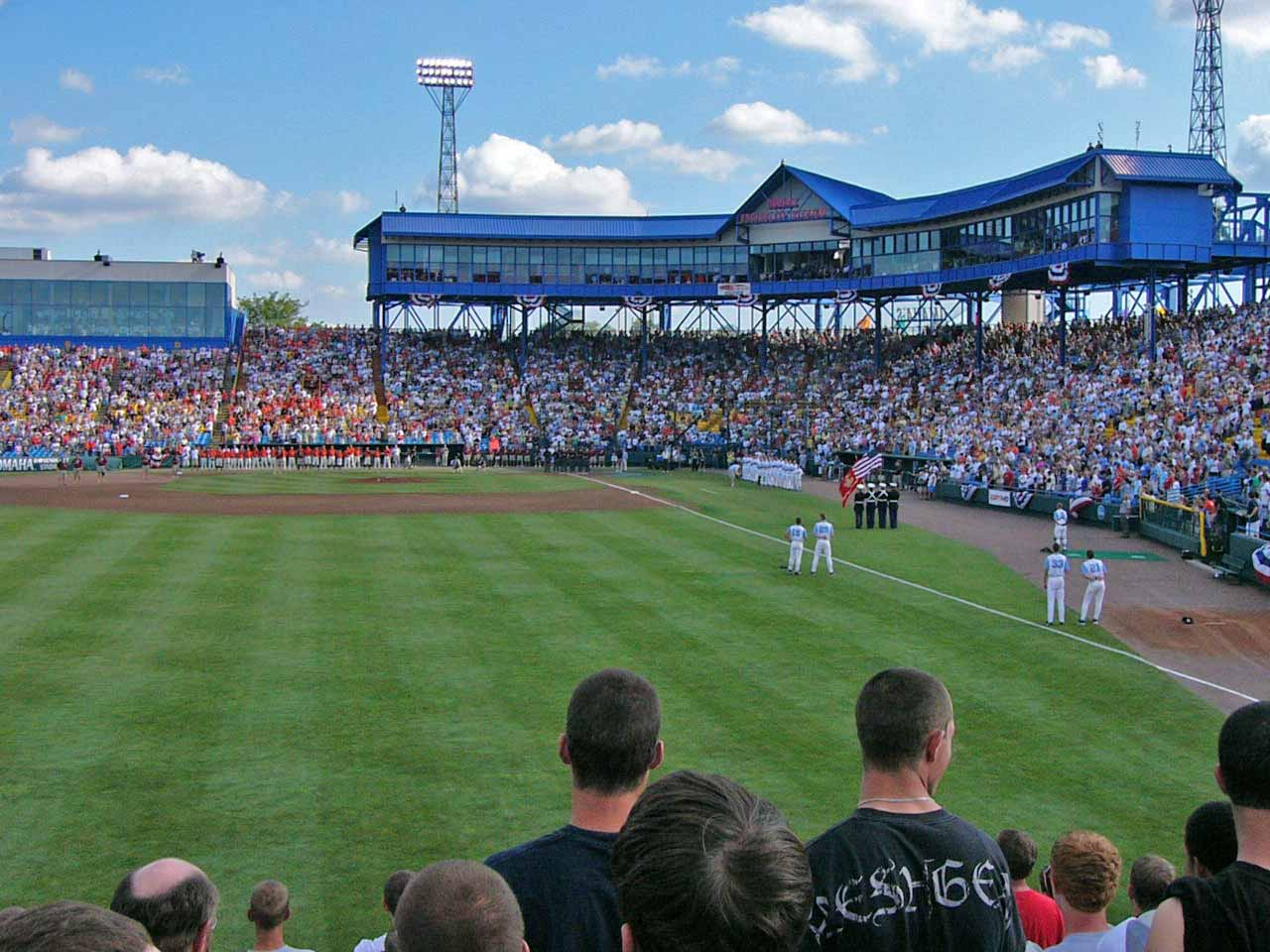
2006 College World Series

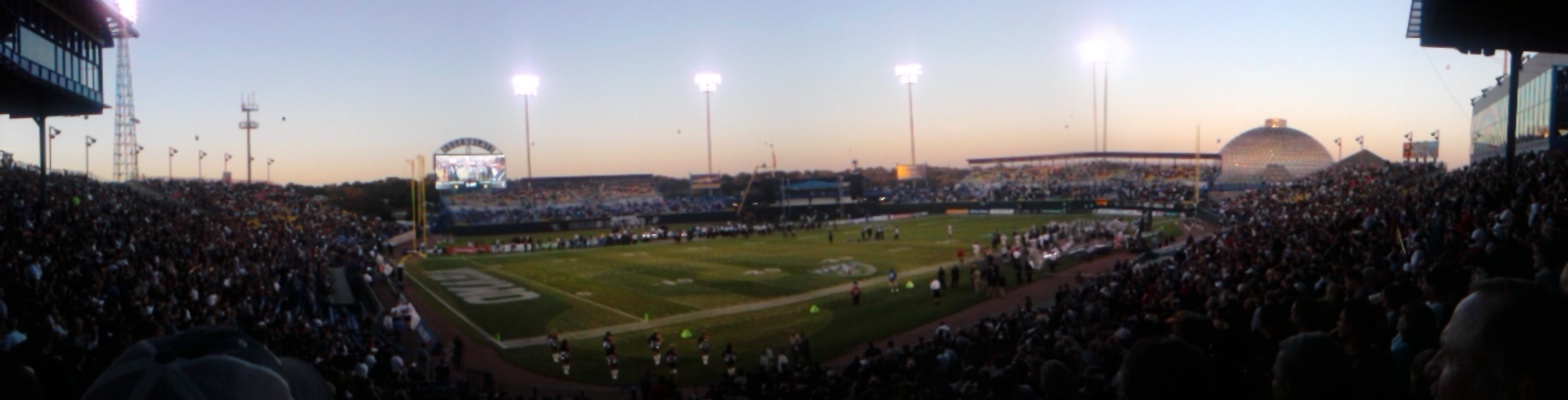
Football configuration for the Omaha Nighthawks

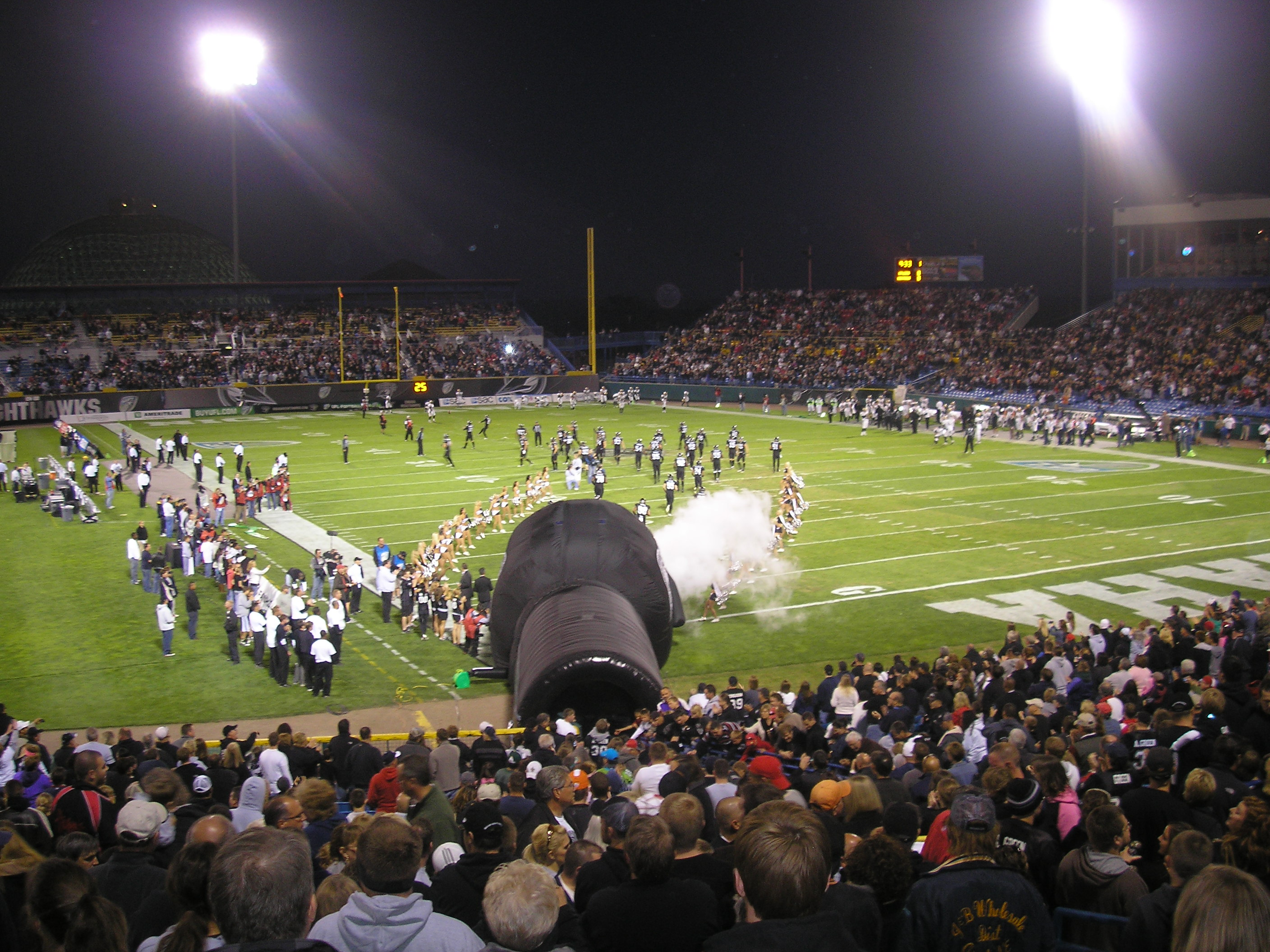
Nighthawks player introductions

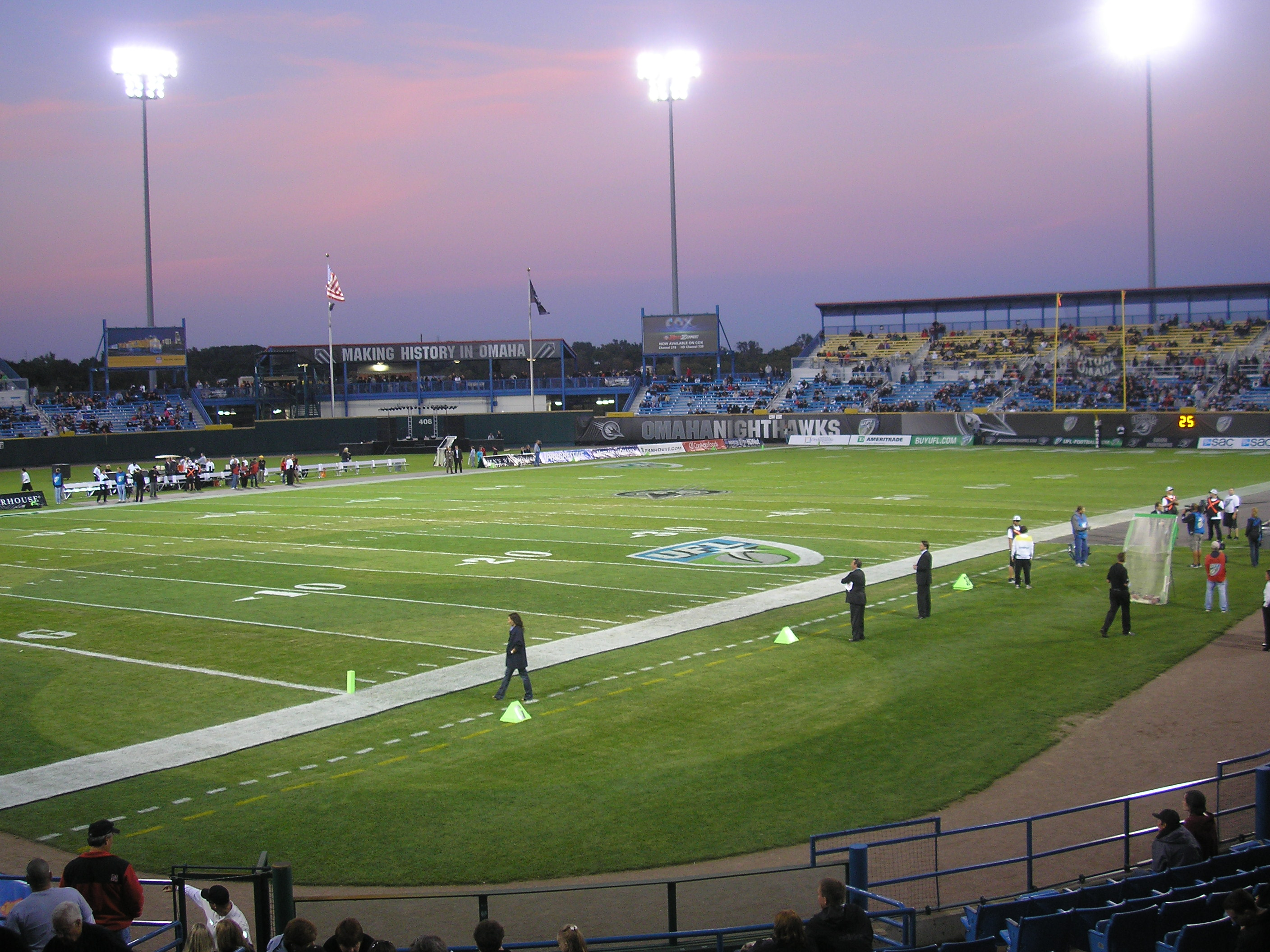
Omaha Nighthawks football at Rosenblatt

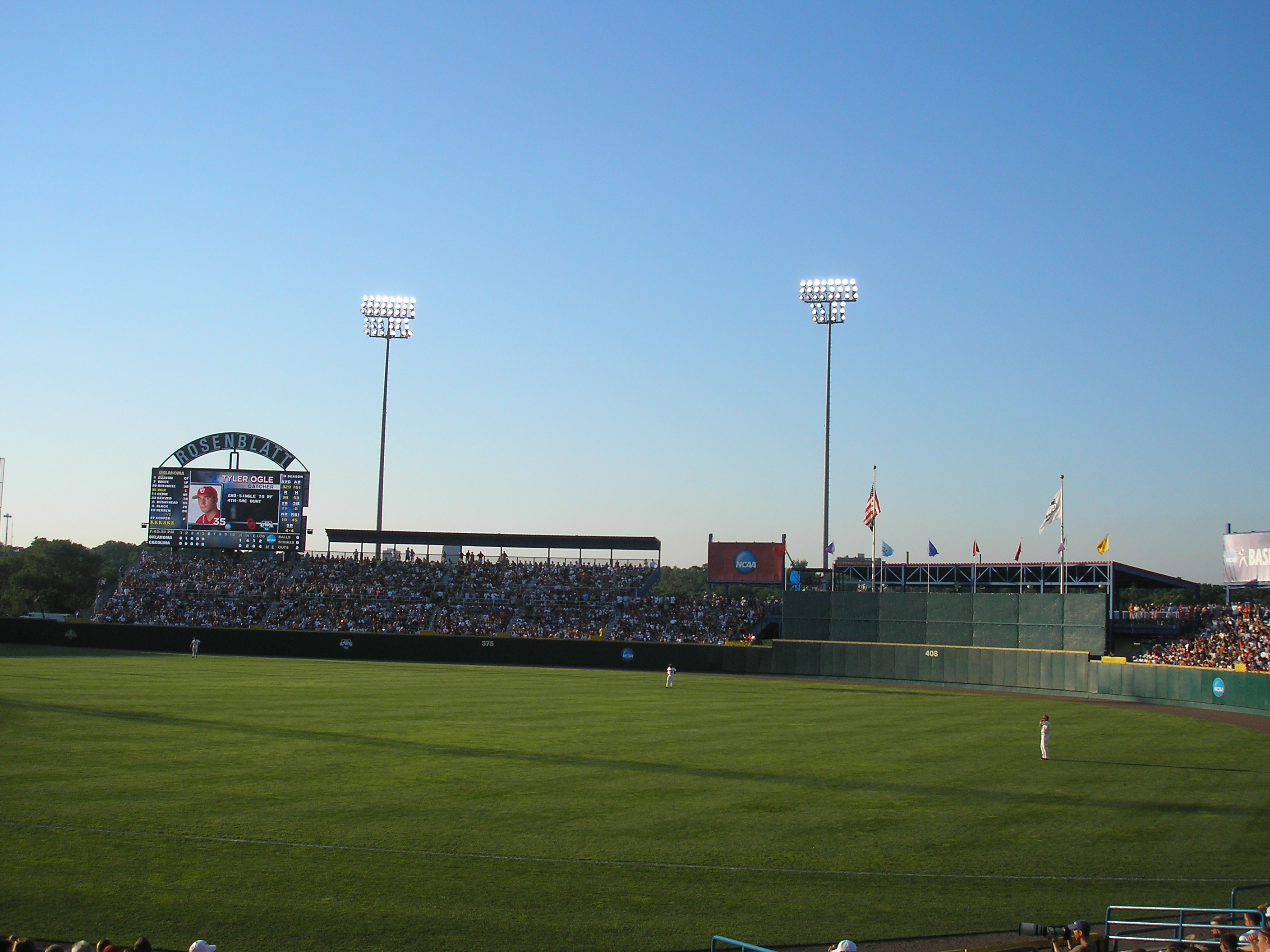

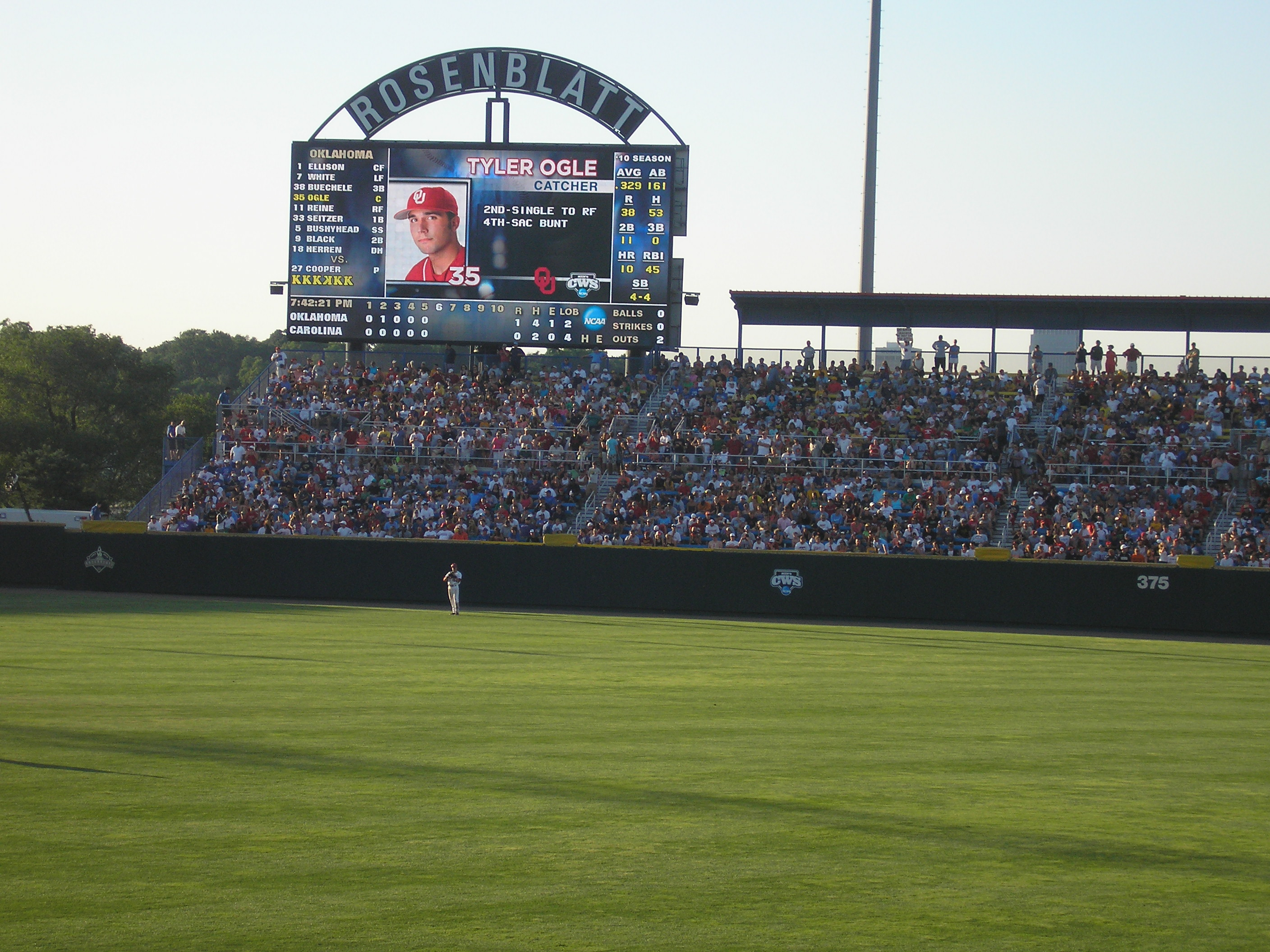

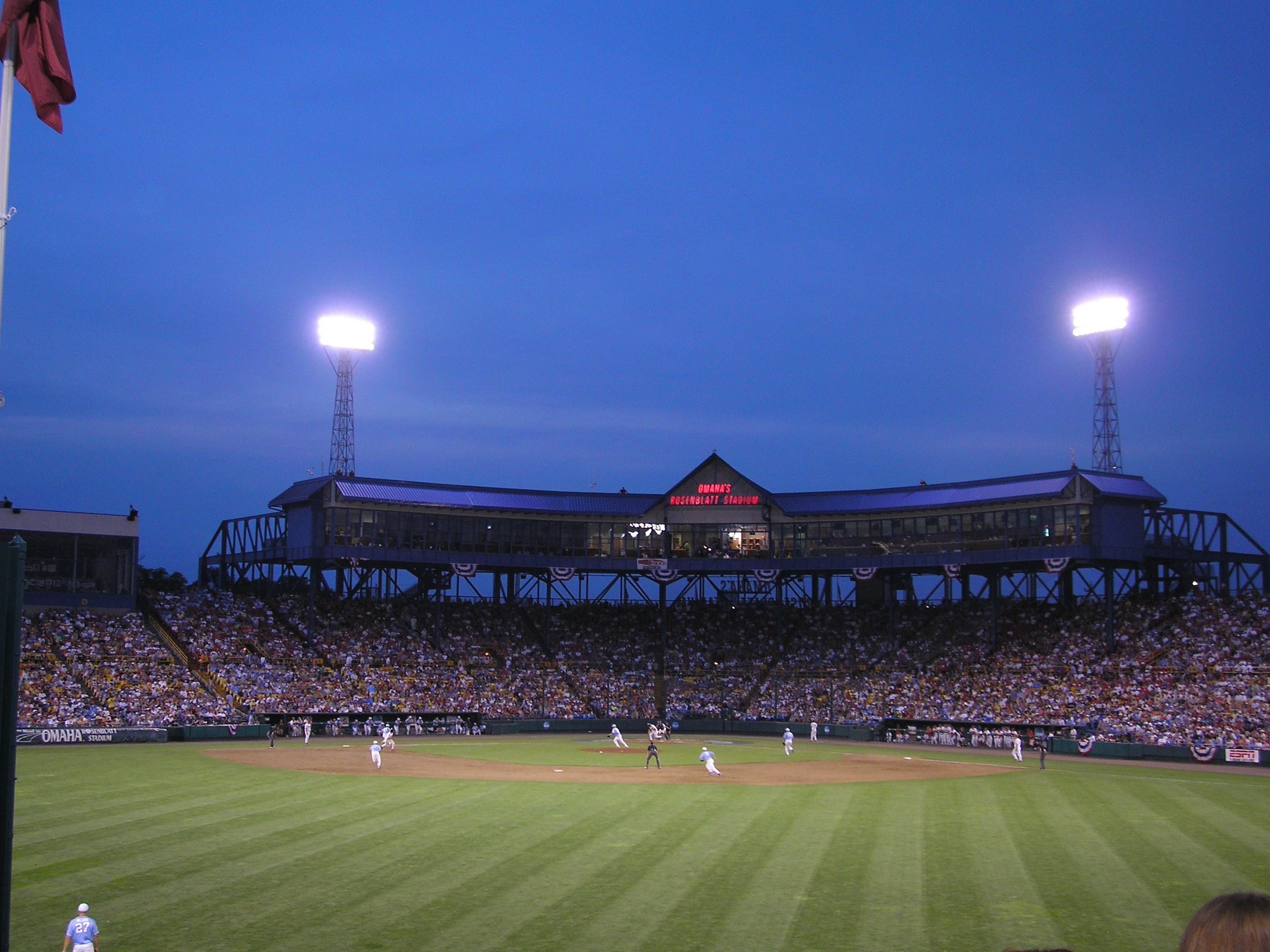

== See also ==
- Charles Schwab Field Omaha – ballpark that replaced Rosenblatt Stadium as home of the College World Series and the Nighthawks in 2011
- Werner Park – ballpark that replaced Rosenblatt Stadium as home of the Royals in 2011
