= Omaha Rockets =

US Negro league baseball team (1947–1949)

The Omaha Rockets were a semi-pro, independent Negro league baseball team in Omaha, Nebraska, from 1947 to 1949. Owned and managed by Will Calhoun, the Rockets played in the Pioneer Nite League and the Nebraska Independent League. The team played across Midwest playing against more than 25 different teams as a barnstorming team.

Gene Collins and Baseball Hall of Fame member Bob Gibson both began their careers with the Omaha Rockets. Hall of Fame pitcher Satchel Paige spent his last season playing with the Rockets. Pro Football Hall of Fame member Richard “Night Train” Lane also played briefly for the Rockets after graduating high school.

In 1950, James "Cool Papa" Bell became the manager of the Omaha Rockets. At the same, the Rockets became the official farm team for the Kansas City Monarchs. However, in August 1950, the Omaha Rockets were disbanded as the Negro League circuits began to close.

The Omaha Storm Chasers paid homage to the Rockets in 2023 by wearing Rockets uniforms for a game.

== See also ==
- African Americans in Omaha, Nebraska
- Sports in Omaha, Nebraska
