= Kadia, Ghana =

Kadia is a community in the Savelugu-Nanton District in the Northern Region of Ghana. It is a populated community with a nucleated settlement. People in the community are predominantly farmers and traders.
