= List of sports teams in Nebraska =

There are a variety of sports in Nebraska. Private organizations, colleges and universities, and other clubs across the state that offer sports throughout Nebraska.

== Professional sports ==
The following are professional sports teams that currently play in the state, or have been confirmed as future teams.

Club	Sport	League	Championships	Founded	Started play
Lincoln Saltdogs	Baseball	American Association (independent)	1 (2009)	2001	2001
North Platte 80s	Baseball	Pecos League (independent)	0	2023	2024
Omaha Storm Chasers	Baseball	International League (AAA)	8 (1969, 1970, 1978, 1990, 2011, 2013, 2014, 2024)	1969	1969
Omaha Beef	Indoor football	National Arena League	3 (2021, 2023, 2024)	1999	2000
Nebraska Siege	Indoor football	The Arena League	0	2026	2026
Tri-City Horsemen	Indoor football	American Arena League	0	2018	2027
Omaha Kings FC	Indoor soccer	Major Arena Soccer League 2	1 (2021)	2019	2019
Omaha Queens FC	Indoor soccer	Major Arena Soccer League Women	0	2024	2024
LOVB Nebraska	Volleyball	LOVB Pro	0	2023	2025
Omaha Supernovas	Volleyball	Major League Volleyball	1 (2024)	2023	2024
Union Omaha	Soccer	USL League One	2 (2021, 2024)	2019	2020

== Amateur sports ==
There are several semi-professional or club sports in Nebraska.

Club	Sport	League	Titles	Founded
Omaha Stockmen	Football	Heartland Football Association	4	2014
Lincoln Stars	Ice hockey	United States Hockey League	5	1996
Omaha Lancers	Ice hockey	United States Hockey League	10	1986
Tri-City Storm	Ice hockey	United States Hockey League	1	2006
No Coast Roller Derby	Roller derby	Women's Flat Track Derby Association	0	2005
Omaha Roller Derby	Roller derby	Women's Flat Track Derby Association	0	2006
Hastings Sodbusters	Baseball	Independence League (Collegiate summer baseball)	?	2018
Fremont Moo	Baseball	Independence League (Collegiate summer baseball)	?	2019
Nebraska Prospects	Baseball	Independence League (Collegiate summer baseball)	?	2022
North Platte Plainsmen	Baseball	Independence League (Collegiate summer baseball)	?	2022
Heartland United FC	Soccer	United Premier Soccer League	0	2024
Omaha Street FC	Soccer	United Premier Soccer League	0	2024
Bana Mboka FC	Soccer	United Premier Soccer League	0	2019
Club Atletico Omaha	Soccer	United Premier Soccer League	0	2025
Reapers FC	Soccer	United Premier Soccer League	0	2025
Super Stars FC	Soccer	United Premier Soccer League	0	2026
Evolution U23	Soccer	The League for Clubs	0	2012
Nebraska Fierce	Soccer	Women's Premier Soccer League	0	2025

== See also ==
- Sports in Omaha
