= Omaha Cardinals =

Minor league baseball team (1947-1959)

- 1947–1959; Omaha, Nebraska

Minor league affiliations
- Class: Triple-A (1955–1959); Class A (1947–1954)
- League: American Association (1955–1959); Western League (1947–1954)

Major league affiliations
- Team: St. Louis Cardinals (1949-1959)

Team data
- Name: Omaha Cardinals (1947–1959)
- Ballpark: Omaha Municipal Stadium (1949–1959); American Legion Park (Council Bluffs, Iowa) (1947–1948)

The Omaha Cardinals were a minor league baseball team based in Omaha, Nebraska, from 1947 through 1959. They played in the Class A Western League through 1954 and in the Triple-A American Association from 1955 to 1959 as an affiliate of their major league namesake, the St. Louis Cardinals.

== History ==
The Omaha Packers had played in the Western League from 1900 through 1936, but the club moved to Rock Island, Illinois in August 1936. The entire league, devastated by the Great Depression, folded after the 1937 campaign.

When the Western League was reborn in 1947, the Cardinals placed a farm club in Omaha. The team drew over 138,000 fans and placed second in the league in attendance, even though it was compelled to play its first two seasons in Council Bluffs, Iowa, while Rosenblatt Stadium was under construction. The Western League franchise remained at or near the top in attendance and won pennants in 1950 and 1951. After the 1954 season, Omaha replaced the Columbus Red Birds as the Cardinals' affiliate in the American Association. In its first Triple-A season, the club, managed by Johnny Keane, drew over 316,000 fans, but by 1959 crowds had dwindled. The last Omaha Cardinals club won a division title but drew a little more than a third of 1955's total.

Among the Omaha Cardinals who had subsequent major league careers include Baseball Hall of Fame pitcher and Omaha native Bob Gibson, Curt Flood, Don Blasingame, Barney Schultz, and manager Keane, who won the 1964 National League pennant and World Series (powered by Gibson's pitching) with the St. Louis Cardinals, and then piloted the New York Yankees.

Omaha dropped out of the American Association after 1959, as the league shrunk in size. After a year's hiatus, the Los Angeles Dodgers operated a Triple-A affiliate, the Omaha Dodgers, in 1961–1962, when the Association disbanded. Then, after six seasons without a professional team, the Kansas City Royals brought Triple-A baseball back to Omaha in 1969 with the Omaha Royals, playing in a revived American Association. The franchise has operated continuously ever since.

== See also ==
- Sports in Omaha, Nebraska
