= Pong-Tamale =

Community in the Northern Region, Ghana

Coordinates: 9.69°N 0.8313°W

Pong-Tamale is a community in the Savelugu-Nanton District in the Northern Region of Ghana. It is a less populated community with nucleated settlement. People in the community are predominantly farmers. It is served with a veterinary college and a Senior School. it is a zongo community with many tribes.
