= Gene Collins =

American baseball player

- Pitcher/Outfielder
- Born: January 7, 1925; Kansas City, Kansas, U.S.
- Died: February 9, 1998 (aged 73); Detroit, Michigan, U.S.
- Batted: Left Threw: Left

Negro league baseball debut
- 1947, for the Kansas City Monarchs

Last Mexican League appearance
- 1961, for the Sultanes de Monterrey
- Stats at Baseball Reference

Teams
- Kansas City Monarchs (1947–1948); Omaha Rockets (19??–19??); Rojos del Águila de Veracruz (1955–1957); Poza Rica Petroleros (1958–1961); Diablos Rojos del México (1961)

Eugene Marvin Collins (January 7, 1925 – February 9, 1998) was an American professional baseball pitcher and outfielder in the Negro leagues, minor leagues and in the Mexican League. He played from 1947 to 1961 with several teams, including the Omaha Rockets.
