= Moglaa =

Coordinates: 9°35′34″N 0°52′30″W

Moglaa is a community in the Savelugu-Nanton District in the Northern Region of Ghana. It is one of the 143 rural communities located in the district with nucleated settlement. Predominantly, the households are male-headed with their main occupation being farming.
