= Nyeko Ghana =

Community in Ghana

Nyeko is a community in the Savelugu-Nanton District of Ghana.

== See also ==
- Suburbs of Tamale (Ghana) metropolis
