= Naabogu =

Naabogu is a community in the Savelugu-Nanton District in the Northern Region of Ghana. It is a less populated community with nucleated settlement.
