= Jena Kpeng =

Jena Kpeng is a farming community in Savelugu-Nanton District in the Northern Region of Ghana.

== See also ==
- Jisonaayili
