= Damdu =

Community in the Savelugu-Nanton District in the Northern Region of Ghana

Damdu is a community in the Savelugu-Nanton District in the Northern Region of Ghana.It is a less populated community with nucleated settlement.
