= Savelugu =

- Town & District Capital
- Location Savelugu in Northern region
- Coordinates: 9°37′N 0°50′W
- Country: Ghana
- Region: Northern Region
- District: Savelugu-Munucipal Assembly

Population (2021)
  - Total: 122,888
- Time zone: GMT
  - Summer (DST): GMT

Savelugu is a town and the capital of Savelugu Municipal, a municipality in the Northern Region of north Ghana. Savelugu has a 2021 settlement population of 122,888 people. There are many villages under Savelugu kingship. Most of the villages are smaller.

== History ==
In the 19th-century, Savelugu was the center of one of the major divisions of the Dagomba and ruled over by Andani who was involved in fighting with the raiding forces of the Zabarima (emirate).

== Culture ==
Savelugu is among the native towns of the Dagbon Kingdom and along with Karaga and Mion. It is one of the three traditional areas that are known as the gate skins to the sacred kingship of the Dagbon Kingdom- the others being Mion and Karaga, reserved only for the Princes of a Ya-Na. Savelugu is also a place where they showcase the culture of Dagbang.

== Economy ==
The town is situated on an economically important route of Tamale-Bolgatanga highway and serves as the administrative and economic capital of the Savelugu Municipal District. Being an Agricultural hub itself and surrounded by towns and villages whose primary economic activity is Agriculture, it hosts the largest market in the district which serves as the main trade point for farmers in the district and other neighboring districts.

== Education ==
The town of Savelugu is known as Yoo yili. It has a senior high school, the Savelugu Senior High School (SAVESS), a second cycle institution. There is also the Savelugu School for the Deaf, one of the few schools for the deaf in Ghana. There are also scattered day-care centers, primary schools and junior high schools within.

== Health ==
Savelegu has a public hospital located at within the Savelegu Municipal. The hospital is located at Madaha Link in Savelegu city.
