= Vera Gushee =

American astronomer

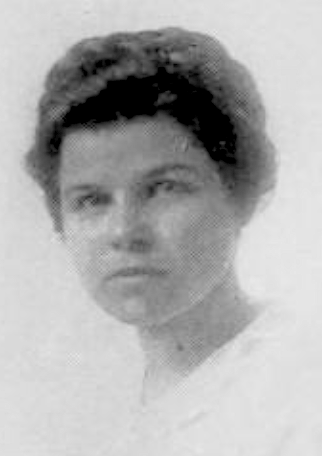
- Vera Gushee, from the 1916 yearbook of Smith College
- Born: February 7, 1894; Cincinnatus, New York, U.S.
- Died: October 27, 1937 (age 43); New York, New York, U.S.
- Occupation(s): Astronomer, college professor

Vera Marie Gushee (February 7, 1894 – October 27, 1937) was an American astronomer and a professor at Smith College.

== Early life and education ==
Gushee was born in Cincinnatus, New York, the daughter of Walter E. Gushee and Helen M. Hatch Gushee. Both of her parents were from Maine; her father was a school superintendent in Massachusetts. She graduated from Smith College, and earned a master's degree at the University of Chicago. She did not pursue a doctoral degree, explaining in 1933 that "The efforts I have made deliberately are towards a greater broadening of my intellectual background than I could get by aiming toward a Ph.D. in Astronomy."

== Career ==
Gushee was an assistant professor of astronomy at Smith College in the 1920s. She also taught at Wellesley College, and lectured at Harvard University. She attended the American Astronomical Society meeting in 1920. She was part of a team of astronomers who photographed a total solar eclipse in 1918, from Matheson, Colorado.

At Smith College, Gushee played harp with the Phaneian Harp Ensemble. She spent some summers teaching at the Music Box, an arts school in Cummington, Massachusetts, which was founded by her Smith College friend Katherine Frazier. She also raised funds for Frazier's school.

== Publications ==
- "Simple observations with a small telescope" (1918)
- "A home-made telescope" (1918)
- "A study of proper motions in the cluster NGC 663" (1919)
- "Orbit of β GC 8933" (1925, with Margaret L. Furrey)
- "Thomas Wright of Durham, Astronomer" (1941; published posthumously)

== Personal life ==
Gushee died in 1937, at the age of 43, in New York City. Her photograph, and a replica of one of her dresses, was part of an exhibit at the University of Chicago Library in 2023, titled "Capturing the Stars: The Untold History of Women at Yerkes Observatory".
