= Lee & Helene Sapp Fieldhouse =

Multi-purpose arena in Omaha, Nebraska

Sapp Fieldhouse
- Sapp Fieldhouse
- Interactive map of Sapp Fieldhouse
- Full name: Lee and Helene Sapp Fieldhouse
- Location: 6311 Maverick Plaza; Omaha, NE 68132
- Coordinates: 41.2574°N 96.00922°W
- Owner: University of Nebraska Omaha
- Operator: University of Nebraska Omaha
- Capacity: 3,500

Construction
- Groundbreaking: 1949
- Opened: 1950
- Renovated: 1997, 2011

Tenants
- Omaha Mavericks men's basketball (1950–2012); Omaha Mavericks women's basketball (until 2015); Omaha Mavericks volleyball (part-time)

Lee & Helene Sapp Fieldhouse is a 3,500-seat multi-purpose arena on the campus of the University of Nebraska Omaha in Omaha, Nebraska. Opened in 1950 adjacent to Al F. Caniglia Field, the Fieldhouse has served as home to several of the school's sports teams, currently known as Omaha Mavericks; among them are men's and women's basketball, women's volleyball, and wrestling. It is also a practice facility for the Mavericks women's track and field program, although that team does not compete there. As of the 2015–16 school year, the only one of these teams that still plays there is the volleyball team, and it only serves as a part-time home. The first team to abandon Sapp Fieldhouse was the wrestling team, which was disbanded in 2011 as a prelude to the school's transition from NCAA Division II to Division I. The next team to leave was men's basketball, which moved off campus to Ralston Arena when it opened in 2012. The women's basketball team remained in the Fieldhouse through the 2014–15 season. With the opening of the on-campus Baxter Arena for the 2015–16 school year, both basketball teams will play there full-time, and the volleyball team will split its home schedule between the Fieldhouse and the new arena.
