= Dipali =

Community in the Northern Region of Ghana

Dipali is a community in the Savelugu-Nanton District in the Northern Region of Ghana. It is a less populated community with nucleated settlement. People in the community are predominantly farmers.
