= Nanton, Ghana =

Nanton is the district capital of the Nanton District in the Northern Region of Ghana.
