= Omaha Dodgers =

- 1961–1962; Omaha, Nebraska
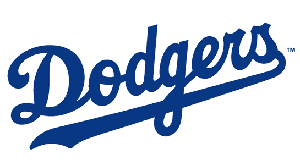

Minor league affiliations
- Previous classes: Triple-A (1961–1962)
- League: American Association (1961–1962)

Major league affiliations
- Previous teams: Los Angeles Dodgers (1961–1962)

Minor league titles
- League titles: none
- Division titles: none

Team data
- Previous names: Omaha Dodgers (1961–1962)

The Omaha Dodgers were a Minor League Baseball team of the American Association and the Triple-A affiliate of the Los Angeles Dodgers from 1961 to 1962. They were located in Omaha, Nebraska. The team was Omaha's second American Association franchise, succeeding the Omaha Cardinals of 1955 to 1959.

== History ==
The Omaha Dodgers were the transplanted St. Paul Saints of the American Association, a longtime Los Angeles Dodgers farm team that was displaced after the 1960 season when the Minnesota Twins moved from Washington, D.C., to bring Major League Baseball to Minneapolis-St. Paul. The O-Dodgers were one of two Triple-A farm clubs of the Dodgers at the time (the Spokane Indians of the Pacific Coast League were the other). Omaha was managed in both seasons of its existence by Danny Ozark, who a decade later would become well-known as manager of the Philadelphia Phillies.

The 1961 Omaha Dodgers finished last in the six-team Association with a record of 62 wins and 87 defeats (.416), 23 1/2 games behind the pennant-winning Indianapolis Indians. They drew 120,000 fans. In 1962, Omaha climbed to second place with a mark of 79 wins and 68 defeats (.537), 10 games behind Indianapolis, but were defeated in the first round of the playoffs by the Denver Bears. The 1962 club drew 109,000 fans, fourth in the six-team league. Members of the O-Dodgers included Bill Lajoie, a future MLB front office executive (then an outfielder), and Pete Richert, who would forge a long career in baseball as a relief pitcher.

At the close of the 1962 season, the American Association disbanded. The Omaha Dodgers and Louisville Colonels folded, and the surviving clubs were absorbed into the Pacific Coast League and the International League. In 1969, the Association was revived and the Omaha Royals became a charter member. The club still exists, and after several name changes and minor league reorganizations now plays as the Omaha Storm Chasers of the International League's Western Division – along with the revived St. Paul Saints, returned to organized Minor League Baseball in 2021 as a Twins affiliate.

== See also ==
- Sports in Omaha, Nebraska
- History of Omaha, Nebraska
