= Nanton District =

District in Northern Region, Ghana

Nanton District Nanton
- District
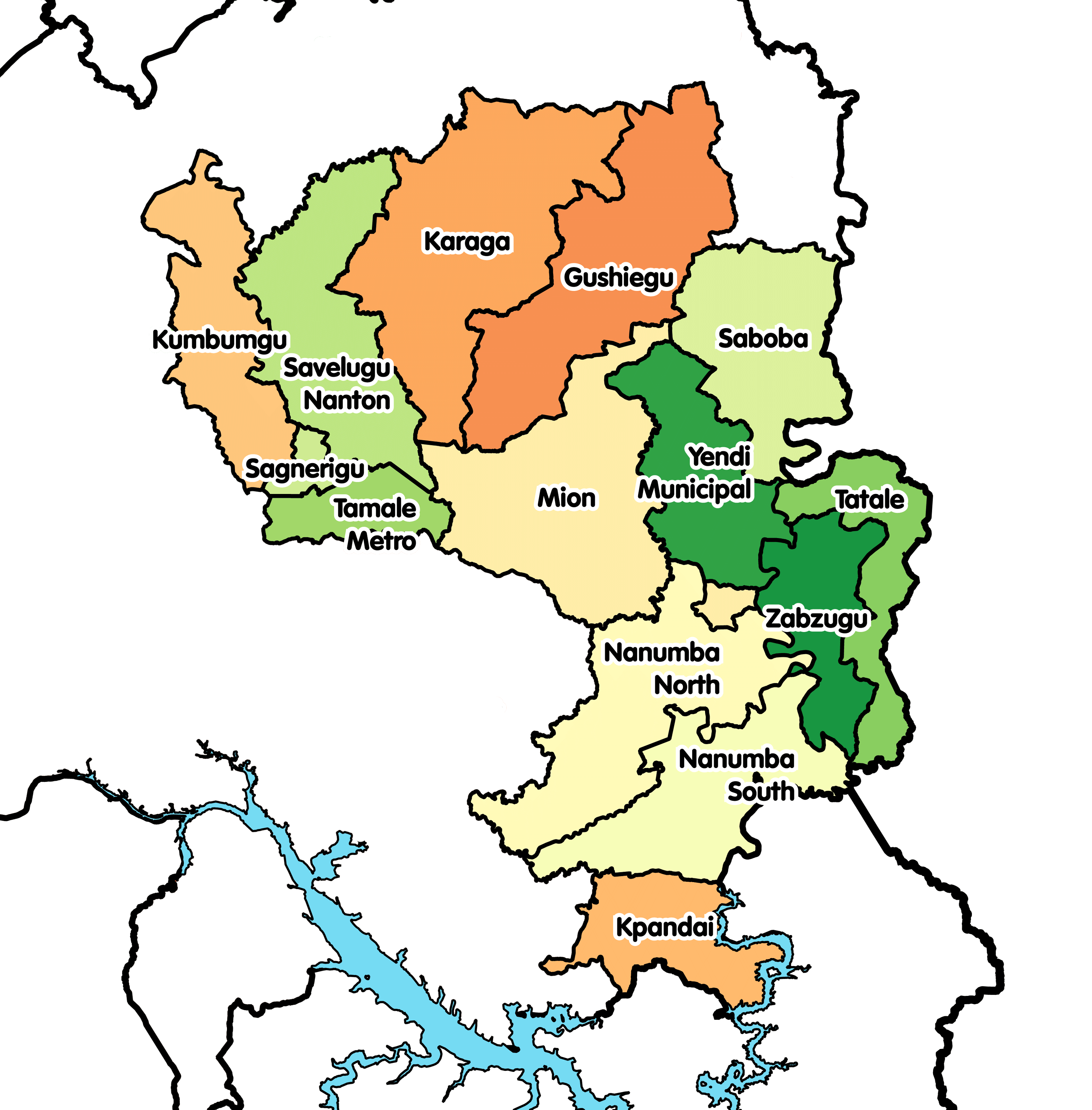
- Districts of Northern Region

- Location of Nanton District within Northern
- Coordinates: 9°33′9.72″N 0°43′54.84″W
- Country: Ghana
- Region: Northern
- Capital: Nanton

Government
  - District Executive: Abdulai Murtala

Population (2021)
  - Total: 50,767
- Time zone: UTC+0 (GMT)
- ISO 3166 code: GH-NP-NT

Nanton District is one of the sixteen districts in Northern Region, Ghana. Originally it was formerly part of the then-larger Savelugu-Nanton District in 1988, which was created from the former West Dagomba District Council, until the southern part of the district was split off to create Nanton District on 15 March 2018; thus the remaining part has been renamed as Savelugu Municipal District. The district is located in the northwest part of Northern Region and has Nanton as its capital town. The district has farming as the major activities.

== Villages ==
- Nanton
- Tampion
- Tinkurugu
- Zieng
- Balishei
- Zoggu
- Nyeko
- Nagdigu
- Kpano
- Looni
- Digu
- Gushei
- Sakpali
- Chahayili
- Nanton kurugu
- Sandu
- Zali
- Kpachilo
- Dingoni
- Sahani
- Chaayili
- Gumani
- Gbumgbum
- Guntingli
- Nanton-Yapalsi
- Zali
- Kpano
- Fazihini
- Nyolugu
- Botingli
- Batangyili
- Dohi
- Gbungnaayili
- Kpunduli
- Janna
- Nyamandu
- Kpukpaligu
- Sahani
- Tahikpamo
- Guno
- Naprisi
- Janjori Kukuo
- Gbarigilanyili
- Saha naayili

== Health facilities in the district ==
1. Nanton Health Center
2. Nagidigu CHPS Compound
3. Tampion Health Center
4. Zieng CHPS Compound
5. Nanton Kurugu CHPS Compound
6. Guntingli CHPS Compound
7. Nyolugu CHPS Compound
8. Jan-jori Kukuo Health Center
9. Fazini health center

== Markets centers in the district ==
1. Nanton market
2. Tampion market
3. Zoggu market
4. Zieng market
