= Zoosali =

Community in the Northern Region of Ghana

Zoosali is a community in the Savelugu-Nanton District in the Northern Region of Ghana. It is a less populated community with nucleated settlement. People in the community are predominantly farmers.

== See also ==
- Suburbs of Savelugu-Nanton(Ghana) District
