= Savelugu Municipal District =

- Municipal District
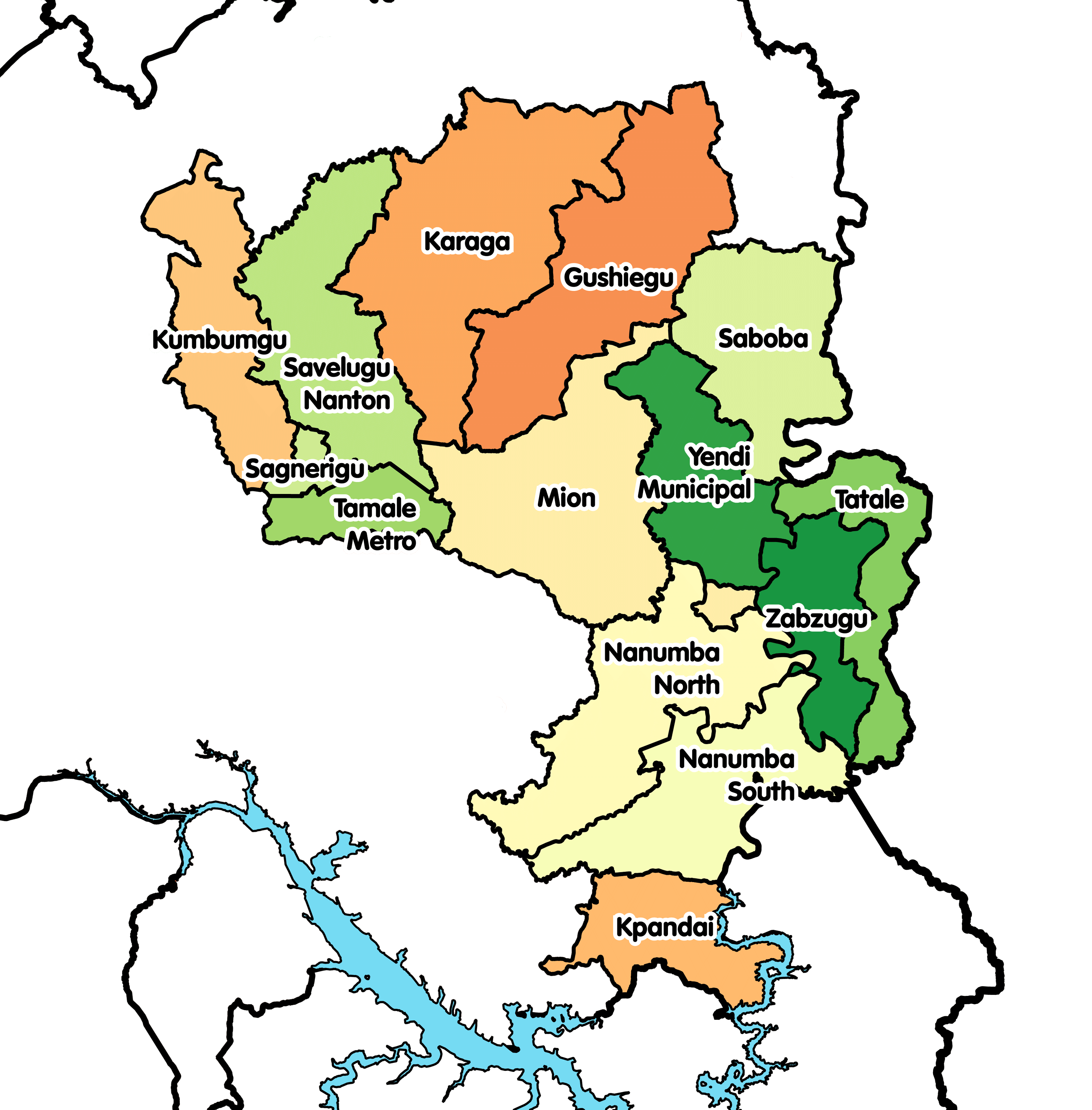
- Districts of Northern Region

- Location of Savelugu Municipal District within Northern
- Coordinates: 9°37′26.4″N 0°49′40.8″W
- Country: Ghana
- Region: Northern
- Capital: Savelugu

Population (2021)
  - Total: 122,888
- Time zone: UTC+0 (GMT)
- ISO 3166 code: GH-NP-SV

Savelugu Municipal District is one of the sixteen districts in Northern Region, Ghana. Originally it was formerly part of the then-larger Savelugu-Nanton District in 1988, which was created from the former West Dagomba District Council, until it was elevated to municipal district assembly status in March 2012 to become Savelugu-Nanton Municipal District. However, on 15 March 2018, the southern part of the district was split off to create Nanton District on 15 March 2018; thus the remaining part has been renamed as Savelugu Municipal District. The municipality is located in the northwest part of Northern Region and has Savelugu as its capital town.
