= Dominic Nyarko Yeboah =

Ghanaian Catholic prelate (born in 1953)

The Most Reverend Dominic Nyarko Yeboah
- Bishop of Techiman, Ghana
- Church: Catholic Church
- Archdiocese: Roman Catholic Archdiocese of Kumasi
- See: Roman Catholic Diocese of Techiman
- Appointed: 28 December 2007
- Installed: 29 March 2008
- Predecessor: Diocese created
- Successor: Incumbent

Orders
- Ordination: 21 July 1990 by James Kwadwo Owusu
- Consecration: 29 March 2008 by Peter Kodwo Appiah Cardinal Turkson
- Rank: Bishop

Personal details
- Born: Dominic Nyarko Yeboah; 19 December 1953 (age 71); Nsuta, Brong-Ahafo Region, Ghana
- Motto: “God's grace is enough”

Styles of Dominic Nyarko Yeboah
- Reference style: Your Lordship; The Most Reverend
- Spoken style: His Lordship
- Religious style: Bishop

Dominic Nyarko Yeboah (also Dominic Yeboah Nyarko) (born 19 December 1953) is a Ghanaian Catholic prelate who is the bishop of the Roman Catholic Diocese of Techiman in Ghana, since 28 December 2007. Before that, from 21 July 1990 until he was appointed bishop, he was a Catholic priest of the Roman Catholic Diocese of Sunyani. He was appointed bishop by Pope Benedict XVI, the same day the Diocese of Techiman was created. He was consecrated and installed at Techiman, on 29 March 2008 as the pioneer bishop of the diocese.

== Background and education ==
Dominic Nyarko Yeboah was born on 19 December 1953 at Nsuta, in the erstwhile Brong-Ahafo Region, in present-day Roman Catholic Diocese of Sunyani in Ghana. He attended local schools and Saint Hubert's Minor Seminary. He entered Saint Peter's Regional Seminary in 1984, where he studied philosophy and theology. He holds a Licentiate in family counselling awarded by Fordham University, in New York City, where he studied from 2004 until 2007.

== Priest ==
On 21 July 1990, Dominic Nyarko Yeboah was ordained a priest of the Roman Catholic Diocese of Sunyani by Bishop James Kwadwo Owusu, Bishop of Sunyani. He served as priest until 28 December 2007. As a priest he served in various roles and locations, including:

- Assistant priest at Dormaa Parish from 1990 until 1991.
- Spiritual director at Saint James Minor Seminary in Sunyani from 1991 until 1998.
- Diocesan vocations director from 1992 until 1993.
- Assistant priest at Berekum Parish from 1998 until 1999.
- Parish priest at Sampa Parish from 1999 until 2004.
- Studies for a Licentiate in family counselling at Fordham University, in New York City from 2004 until 2007.

== As bishop ==
On 28 December 2007, Pope Benedict XVI appointed Father Dominic Nyarko Yeboah, previously a member of the clergy of Sunyani Diocese, as bishop of the newly-created diocese of Techiman, Ghana. He is the pioneer bishop at Techiman, a suffragan of the Metropolitan Ecclesiastical Province of Kumasi.

He was consecrated bishop on 29 March 2008 by Peter Kodwo Appiah Cardinal Turkson, Archbishop of Cape Coast assisted by Bishop Lucas Abadamloora, Bishop of Navrongo-Bolgatanga and Bishop Matthew Kwasi Gyamfi, Bishop of Sunyani.

== See also ==
- Catholic Church in Ghana

== Succession table ==
Catholic Church titles
Preceded by Diocese created	Bishop of Techiman (since 28 December 2007)	Succeeded by Incumbent
