= List of Catholic dioceses in Ghana =

The Roman Catholic Church in Ghana (West Africa) is composed solely of a Latin hierarchy, joint in the national Episcopal Conference of Ghana, comprising a single pre-diocesan (exempt) apostolic vicariate and four ecclesiastical provinces, each headed by a Metropolitan Archdiocese, with a total of 15 suffragan dioceses.

There are no Eastern Catholic jurisdictions or quasi-diocesan ordinariates.

There are no titular sees. All defunct jurisdictions have current successor sees.

There is an Apostolic Nunciature to Ghana (in national capital Accra) as papal diplomatic representation (embassy-level).

== Current Latin dioceses ==
=== Immediately Subject to the Holy See ===
- pre-diocesan Apostolic Vicariate of Donkorkrom

=== Latin provinces ===
==== Ecclesiastical Province of Accra ====
- Metropolitan Archdiocese of Accra
  - Diocese of Ho
  - Diocese of Jasikan
  - Diocese of Keta-Akatsi
  - Diocese of Koforidua

==== Ecclesiastical Province of Cape Coast ====
- Metropolitan Archdiocese of Cape Coast
  - Diocese of Sekondi-Takoradi
  - Diocese of Wiawso

==== Ecclesiastical Province of Kumasi ====
- Metropolitan Archdiocese of Kumasi
  - Diocese of Goaso
  - Diocese of Konongo-Mampong
  - Diocese of Obuasi
  - Diocese of Sunyani
  - Diocese of Techiman

==== Ecclesiastical Province of Tamale ====
- Metropolitan Archdiocese of Tamale
  - Diocese of Damongo
  - Diocese of Navrongo-Bolgatanga
  - Diocese of Wa
  - Diocese of Yendi

== See also ==
- Catholic Church in Ghana
- List of Catholic dioceses (structured view)

== Sources and external links ==
- GCatholic.org - data for all sections.
- Catholic-Hierarchy entry.
