= Matthew Kwasi Gyamfi =

Ghanaian Roman Catholic Bishop (born 1957)

- Bishop of Sunyani
- Church: Catholic Church
- Diocese: Diocese of Sunyani
- Appointed: 14 April 2003
- Predecessor: James Kwadwo Owusu

Orders
- Ordination: 27 July 1985 by James Kwadwo Owusu
- Consecration: 28 June 2003 by Peter Kwasi Sarpong

Personal details
- Born: 11 August 1957 (age 68) Wamanafo, Ashanti Region, Dominion of Ghana

Matthew Kwasi Gyamfi (born 11 August 1957 in Wamanafo, Ghana) is a Ghanaian Catholic prelate who has served as Bishop of Sunyani since 2003. He is the current president of the Ghana Catholic Bishops Conference. He is also the episcopal chairman of the Catholic University of Ghana, Fiapre, and serves as a member of its governing council.

== Early life and education ==
Gyamfi was born on 11 August 1957 at Wamanafo in the Dormaa East District in the Bono Region. He proceeded to study at the St. Hubert Seminary in Kumasi and later pursued courses in Philosophy and Theology at St. Peter's Seminary in Cape Coast, culminating in successful completion. Gyamfi from 1994 to 1998 studied at the University of Toronto in Canada and received a doctorate degree in Geography and master's degree in education from Ontario Institute.

== Career ==
He received his priestly ordination from the late Bishop James Kwadwo Owusu. Subsequently, he held the role of Assistant Administrator at the Christ The King Cathedral in Sunyani for a span of two years that is between January and September 1987, he served as a Chaplain at the St. Joseph's Training College in Bechem while teaching religious studies at the institution. Later on, he embarked on a degree program in Social Sciences at the University of Ghana.

From 1990 to 1991, he assumed the role of acting Parish Priest at St. Peter's Parish in Kenyasi, in the Asutifi North District in the Ahafo Region. Additionally, he served as the Vice-Rector and a full-time tutor at St. James Minor Seminary located in Abesim, near Sunyani, from 1991 to 1993.

=== Episcopate ===
Gyamfi was ordained a priest on 27 July 1985 by Bishop James Kwadwo Owusu, the bishop of Sunyani Diocese. Subsequently, he was appointed by John Paul II as the second Bishop of Sunyani on 14 April 2003, he received his episcopal consecration on 28 June 2003 from Archbishop Peter Kwasi Sarpong with Cardinal Peter Appiah Turkson and Bishop Lucas Abadamloora serving as co-consecrators.

In November 2022, he was elected as the President of the Ghana Catholic Bishops' Conference, and he has been serving as the Chancellor of the Catholic University College of Ghana since in 2003. He served as the Episcopal Chairman of the National Catechetical Commission on the Catholic Bishops' Conference from 2004 to 2011. He moved on to serve as the Episcopal Chairman of Education and National Catechetical Commission in 2011.

In 2003 he assumed the role of Episcopal Chairman of the Catholic University of Ghana, Fiapre, and concurrently serves as a member of the governing council of the university.

== See also ==
- Roman Catholicism in Ghana
- List of Roman Catholic dioceses in Ghana
