= John Yaw Afoakwah =

Ghanaian Catholic prelate (born 1955)

The Most Reverend John Yaw Afoakwah
- Bishop of Obuasi, Ghana
- Church: Catholic Church
- Archdiocese: Roman Catholic Archdiocese of Kumasi
- See: Roman Catholic Diocese of Obuasi
- Appointed: 22 November 2014
- Installed: 10 January 2015
- Predecessor: Gabriel Justice Yaw Anokye
- Successor: Incumbent

Orders
- Ordination: 11 July 1992
- Consecration: 10 January 2015 by Gabriel Justice Yaw Anokye
- Rank: Bishop

Personal details
- Born: John Yaw Afoakwah; 26 January 1955 (age 71) Mampamhwɛ, Diocese of Kumasi, Ashanti Region, Ghana

Styles of John Yaw Afoakwah
- Reference style: Your Lordship; The Most Reverend
- Spoken style: His Lordship
- Religious style: Bishop

John Yaw Afoakwah (born 26 January 1955) is a Ghanaian Catholic prelate who is the Bishop of the Roman Catholic Diocese of Obuasi in the Metropolitan Ecclesiastical Province of Kumasi in Ghana. He was appointed bishop by Pope Francis on 22 November 2014. He was consecrated as bishop and installed at Obuasi, Ghana on 10 January 2015.

== Background and education ==
John Yaw Afoakwah was born on 26 January 1955 at Mampamhwɛ, Diocese of Kumasi, Ashanti Region, in Ghana. His father Opanin Kwame Afoakwah died when he was eleven years old. After the death of his father, the family relocated to Akrokerry, where he grew up. He attended Middle School at the Saint Peter's Boys' School in Kumasi, graduating in 1970. He transferred to Saint John's Secondary School at Sekondi, in the Western Region, Ghana where he obtained his O-Level certificate in 1975.

He studied at the Wesley College of Education, in Kumasi where he graduated with a Teacher Certificate A in 1978. He privately studied for Advanced Level (A-Level) education. He first taught as a teacher at Collins Senior High School, Agogo from 1978 until 1981. From 1981 until 1983, he studied at the Pontifical Urban University, in Rome, Italy where he graduated with a Bachelor of Arts in Religious Education. He studied philosophy and theology at the Saint Peter's Regional Seminary in Pedu, Cape Coast. He graduated with a Bachelor of Arts degree in Religion with Sociology from the University of Ghana, Legon, Accra in 1992. He obtained his Post Graduate Diploma in Education (PDGE) from the University of Cape Coast in 2004. In 2010, he graduated with a Master of Science degree in Education at Le Moyne College in Syracuse, New York State, United States.

== Priest ==
He was ordained a priest of the Roman Catholic Archdiocese of Kumasi on 11 July 1992 at Adugyama. He was appointed Chaplain and Teacher, Director of Guidance and Counselling at the Saint Louis Training College, in Kumasi. He also concurrently served as the Director of the Catholic School of Evangelization of the Archdiocese of Kumasi. When the Catholic Diocese of Obuasi was created on 3 March 1995, Father John Yaw Afoakwah was incardinated as a priest of the newly-created diocese. He served as priest until 22 November 2014.

== Bishop ==
Pope Francis appointed him Bishop of the Roman Catholic Diocese of Obuasi on 22 November 2014. He was consecrated and installed at Obuasi on 10 January 2015. The Principal Consecrator was Archbishop Gabriel Justice Yaw Anokye, Archbishop of Kumasi assisted by Archbishop Jean-Marie Antoine Joseph Speich, Titular Archbishop of Sulci and Archbishop Thomas Kwaku Mensah, Archbishop Emeritus of Kumasi.

== See also ==
- Catholic Church in Ghana

== Succession table ==
Catholic Church titles
Preceded by Gabriel Justice Yaw Anokye (26 March 2008 - 15 May 2012)	Bishop of Obuasi (since 22 November 2014)	Succeeded by Incumbent
