= Joseph Osei-Bonsu =

Ghanaian Catholic prelate (born 1948)

The Most Reverend Joseph Osei-Bonsu
- Bishop Emeritus of Konongo-Mampong, Ghana
- Church: Catholic Church
- Archdiocese: Roman Catholic Archdiocese of Kumasi
- See: Roman Catholic Diocese of Konongo-Mampong
- Appointed: 3 March 1995
- Installed: 28 May 1995
- Term ended: 21 March 2024
- Predecessor: Diocese created
- Successor: John Opoku-Agyemang
- Other post: Apostolic Administrator of Konongo-Mampong (21 March 2024 - 7 June 2024)

Orders
- Ordination: 3 August 1975 by Peter Kwasi Sarpong
- Consecration: 28 May 1995 by Jozef Cardinal Tomko
- Rank: Bishop

Personal details
- Born: Joseph Osei-Bonsu; 8 February 1948 (age 78) Jamasi, Diocese of Kumasi, Ashanti Region, Ghana

Styles of Joseph Osei-Bonsu
- Reference style: Your Lordship; The Most Reverend
- Spoken style: His Lordship
- Religious style: Bishop

Joseph Osei-Bonsu (born 8 February 1948) is a Ghanaian Catholic prelate who was the Bishop of the Roman Catholic Diocese of Konongo-Mampong in the Metropolitan Ecclesiastical Province of Kumasi in Ghana. He was appointed bishop by Pope John Paul II on 3 March 1995. He was consecrated as bishop on 28 May 1995 and installed at Mampong, Ghana on 11 June 1995. His age-related retirement was accepted by Pope Francis on 21 March 2024. While in retirement, he served as Apostolic Administrator of Konongo-Mampong from 21 March 2024 until 7 June 2024.

== Background and priesthood ==
Joseph Osei-Bonsu was born on 8 February 1948 at Jamasi, Diocese of Kumasi, Ashanti Region, in Ghana. He studied philosophy and theology at seminary. He was ordained a priest of the Roman Catholic Diocese of Kumasi on 3 August 1975 by Bishop Peter Kwasi Sarpong, Bishop of Kumasi. He served as a priest until 3 March 1995.

== Bishop ==
On 3 March 1995, Pope John Paul II created the Roman Catholic Diocese of Konongo-Mampong by taking territory from the dioceses of Kumasi and Sunyani. The Holy Father appointed Father Joseph Osei-Bonsu, a member of the clergy of Kumasi as the pioneer bishop of the new diocese effective that day. He was consecrated bishop at Independence Square, Accra, Archdiocese of Accra on 28 May 1995 by the hands of Jozef Cardinal Tomko, Cardinal-Deacon of Gesù Buon Pastore alla Montagnola assisted by Bishop Francis Anani Kofi Lodonu, Bishop of Ho and Archbishop Gregory Eebolawola Kpiebaya, Archbishop of Tamale. In June 2021, both Bishop Joseph Osei-Bonsu and the Catholic Diocese of Konongo-Mampong celebrated their joint 25th year anniversary (silver jubilee).

On 21 March 2024, Pope Francis accepted the age-related resignation from the pastoral care of the diocese of Konongo-Mampong, Ghana, presented by Bishop Joseph Osei-Bonsu. The Holy Father appointed the Monsignor Father John Opoku-Agyemang, previously a member of the clergy of Konongo-Mampong, Ghana, as the new bishop of the same diocese. Bishop Joseph Osei-Bonsu served as Apostolic administrator of the Diocese of Konongo-Mampong from the he retired until the day his successor was consecrated.

== See also ==
- Catholic Church in Ghana

== Succession table ==
Catholic Church titles
Preceded by Diocese created	Bishop of Konongo-Mampong (3 March 1995 - 21 March 2024)	Succeeded by John Opoku-Agyemang (since 21 March 2024)
