= John Opoku-Agyemang =

Ghanaian Catholic prelate (born 1957)

The Most Reverend John Opoku-Agyemang
- Bishop of Konongo-Mampong, Ghana
- Church: Catholic Church
- Archdiocese: Roman Catholic Archdiocese of Kumasi
- See: Roman Catholic Diocese of Konongo-Mampong
- Appointed: 21 March 2024
- Installed: 7 June 2024
- Predecessor: Joseph Osei-Bonsu
- Successor: Incumbent

Orders
- Ordination: 22 January 1984
- Consecration: 7 June 2024 by Henryk Mieczysław Jagodziński
- Rank: Bishop

Personal details
- Born: John Opoku-Agyemang; 15 August 1957 (age 68) Kumawu, Diocese of Konongo-Mampong, Ashanti Region, Ghana
- Motto: Dominus fortitudo mea (The Lord is my strength)

Styles of John Opoku-Agyemang
- Reference style: Your Lordship; The Most Reverend
- Spoken style: His Lordship
- Religious style: Bishop

John Opoku-Agyemang (15 August 1957) is a Ghanaian Catholic prelate who is the bishop of the Roman Catholic Diocese of Konongo-Mampong in Ghana since 21 March 2024. Before that, from 3 March 1995 until he was appointed bishop, he was a priest of the same Catholic diocese. He was appointed bishop on 21 March 2024 by Pope Francis. He was consecrated and installed at Mampong, Ghana on 7 June 2024.

== Background and education ==
John Opoku-Agyemang was born on 15 August 1957 in Kumawu, Diocese of Konongo-Mampong, Ashanti Region, Ghana. He studied at the Saint Hubert's Minor Seminary in Kumasi from 1971 until 1976 for his O-Level education and from 1977 until 1978 for his A-Level education. He studied philosophy at Saint Peter's Regional Seminary in Cape Coast from 1978 until 1980. He holds a diploma in clinical pastoral education awarded in 1982, by the University of St. Thomas (Texas), in Houston, Texas, United States. The same university awarded him a Master of Divinity in theology in 1983. His Doctorate in pastoral theology was obtained in 2001, from the University of Saint Thomas, Minnesota in Saint Paul, Minnesota, United States.

== Priest ==
On 22 January 1984 he was ordained a Catholic priest for the Archdiocese of Kumasi. When the Diocese of Konongo-Mampong was created on 3 March 1995, he was incardinated in the new diocese. He served as a priest until 21 March 2024.

While a priest, he served in various roles and locations including:

- Deputy parish priest of Saint Joseph Parish in Esase Bontefufuo from 1984 until 1985.
- Parish priest of Our Lady of the Rosary Parish from 1985 until 2009.
- Chaplain of Kwame Nkrumah University of Science and Technology (KNUST) in Kumasi from 1985 until 2009.
- Part-time Lecturer, Faculty of Social Sciences, KNUST, Kumasi from 1985 until 1999.
- Director and instructor: Rite of Christian Initiation of Adults (RCIA), Most Holy Trinity Parish, Saint Louis Park, Minnesota, United States from 1999 until 2001.
- Rector and Formator, Saint Gregory the Great Provincial Major Seminary, Parkoso, Kumasi from 2009 until 2024.
- Member of the College of Consultors and the Presbyteral Council of Konongo-Mampong since 1995.

== Bishop ==
On 21 March 2024, Pope Francis accepted the age-related resignation from pastoral care of the Catholic Diocese of Konongo-Mampong, presented by Bishop Joseph Osei-Bonsu. The Holy Father appointed Reverend Father Monsignor John Opoku-Agyemang, of the clergy of Konongo-Mampong, as the new Local Ordinary at Konongo-Mampong.

He was consecrated bishop and installed at Mampong on 7 June 2024 by the hands of Archbishop Henryk Mieczysław Jagodziński, Titular Archbishop of Limosano assisted by Bishop Joseph Osei-Bonsu, Bishop Emeritus of Konongo-Mampong and Archbishop Gabriel Justice Yaw Anokye, Archbishop of Kumasi.

== See also ==
- Catholic Church in Ghana

== Succession table ==
Preceded by Joseph Osei-Bonsu (3 March 1995 - 21 March 2024)	Bishop of Konongo-Mampong (since 21 March 2024)	Succeeded by Incumbent
