= Peter Kwaku Atuahene =

Ghanaian Catholic prelate (born in 1956)

The Most Reverend Peter Kwaku Atuahene
- Bishop of Goaso, Ghana
- Church: Catholic Church
- Archdiocese: Roman Catholic Archdiocese of Kumasi
- See: Roman Catholic Diocese of Goaso
- Appointed: 24 October 1997
- Installed: 6 January 1998
- Predecessor: Diocese created
- Successor: Incumbent

Orders
- Ordination: 12 July 1986 by James Kwadwo Owusu
- Consecration: 6 January 1998 by Pope John Paul II
- Rank: Bishop

Personal details
- Born: Peter Kwaku Atuahene; 25 September 1956 (age 69) Brosankro, Ahafo Region, Ghana

Styles of Peter Kwaku Atuahene
- Reference style: Your Lordship; The Most Reverend
- Spoken style: His Lordship
- Religious style: Bishop

Peter Kwaku Atuahene (born 25 September 1956) is a Ghanaian Catholic prelate who is the bishop of the Roman Catholic Diocese of Goaso in Ghana, since 24 October 1997. Before that, from 12 July 1986 until he was appointed bishop, he was a Catholic priest of the Roman Catholic Diocese of Sunyani. He was appointed bishop by Pope John Paul II, the same day the Diocese of Goaso was created. He was consecrated bishop of Goaso on 6 January 1998, as the pioneer bishop of the diocese.

== Background and education ==
Peter Kwaku Atuahene was born on 25 September 1956 at Brosankro, Ahafo Region, Diocese of Sunyani, Ghana. He attended primary school in his home area. For his secondary school education, he attended Kumasi High School and Saint Hubert's Minor Seminary in Kumasi. Later, he studied at Saint Peter's Regional Seminary in Cape Coast, in Ghana and at Duquesne University in Pittsburgh, Pennsylvania, United States, where he graduated with a Master of Arts degree in "Formative Spirituality and Ministry".

== Priest ==
On 12 July 1986, he was ordained a priest of the Roman Catholic Diocese of Sunyani by Bishop James Kwadwo Owusu. He served as priest until 24 October 1997. As a priest he served in various roles and locations, including:

- Assistant Parish Priest in Sampa from 1986 until 1988.
- Spiritual Director at Saint James Seminary in Sunyani from 1988 until 1989.
- Spiritual Director at Saint Peter's Seminary at Cape Coast from 1991 until 1997.

== As bishop ==
On 24 October 1997, Pope John Paul II appointed Peter Kwaku Atuahene, previously the spiritual director at Saint Peter's Seminary in Cape Coast, Ghana, as bishop of the newly-created diocese of Goaso, Ghana. He is the pioneer bishop at Goaso, a suffragan of the Metropolitan Ecclesiastical Province of Kumasi.

He was consecrated bishop on 6 January 1998 by Pope John Paul II assisted by Archbishop Giovanni Battista Re, Titular Archbishop of Forum Novum and Archbishop Jorge María Mejía, Titular Archbishop of Apollonia.

While bishop, he has held various leadership positions including:

- Pioneer Catholic Bishop at Diocese of Goaso since 1997.
- Episcopal Chairman for Pontifical Mission Societies from 1998 until 2005.
- Episcopal Chairman for Migrants and Refugees from 2005 until 2007.
- Episcopal Chairman for Seminaries and Vocations from 2008 until 2016.
- Episcopal Chairman for Pontifical Mission Societies from 2017 until 2022.
- Episcopal Chairman: Catechetics and Religious Education since 2022.
- Chairperson, College Governing Council at Saint Joseph College of Education since 2009.
- Chairperson, Regional Peace Council, Ahafo Region, since 2021.

Bishop Peter Kwaku Atuahene and the Catholic Diocese of Goaso celebrated their joint silver jubilee on 12 February 2023.

== See also ==
- Catholic Church in Ghana

== Succession table ==
Catholic Church titles
Preceded by Diocese created	Bishop of Goaso (since 24 October 1997)	Succeeded by Incumbent
