= Alfred Agyenta =

Ghanaian Catholic Bishop

- Bishop of Navrongo–Bolgatanga
- Church: Catholic Church
- Diocese: Diocese of Navrongo–Bolgatanga
- Appointed: 5 April 2011
- Predecessor: Lucas Abadamloora

Orders
- Ordination: 6 August 1988
- Consecration: 29 June 2011 by Léon Kalenga Badikebele

Personal details
- Born: 20 January 1959 (age 67) Wiaga, Northern Region, Dominion of Ghana, British Empire

Alfred Agyenta (born January 20, 1959) is a Ghanaian prelate of the catholic church, who serves as Bishop of the Navrongo–Bolgatanga Catholic Diocese.

== Early life ==
Agyenta was born at Wiaga in the Builsa District of the Upper east Region of Ghana, on January 20, 1959, to Mr. Sylvester Agyenta and Mrs. Diana Agyenta. Sylvester was a carpenter and a cook for the Missionaries in Wiaga, while Diana dutifully served the family as a housewife.

== Education and Career ==
Bishop Alfred Agyenta had his basic education in Wiaga from 1964 to 1974 and subsequently attended Notre Dame Minor Seminary Secondary School in Navrongo from 1974 to 1979 for his O-Levels. He went on to study his ‘A’ levels at Nandom High School. In 1981, He entered St. Victor's Major Seminary in Tamale for his priestly formation. He was Ordained on August 6, 1988, in Wiaga for the Navrongo–Bolgatanga Diocese. He served as assistant parish priest at Our Lady of Seven Sorrows Cathedral, Navrongo, from 1988 to 1991.

He was sent to Rome to study the Holy Scriptures in the Biblicum and returned to Ghana after his studies. He was subsequently appointed a lecturer and formator at the St. Victor's Major Seminary in Tamale from 1995 to 2000. Agyenta went to Leuven, Belgium, to pursue his doctorate and returned in 2006 and was once again appointed a staff of the St. Victor's Major Seminary, and he served in this capacity until his appointment as bishop of the Navrongo–Bolgatanga Diocese.
