= James Kwadwo Owusu =

Ghanaian Catholic prelate (born 1927)

The Most Reverend James Kwadwo Owusu
- Bishop of Sunyani, Ghana (Deceased)
- Church: Catholic Church
- Archdiocese: Roman Catholic Archdiocese of Kumasi
- See: Roman Catholic Diocese of Sunyani
- Appointed: 1 March 1973
- Installed: 30 June 1973
- Term ended: 28 Dember 2001
- Predecessor: Diocese created
- Successor: Matthew Kwasi Gyamfi

Orders
- Ordination: 8 December 1956
- Consecration: 30 June 1973 by John Kodwo Amissah
- Rank: Bishop

Personal details
- Born: James Kwadwo Owusu; 19 December 1927 Kwasibuokrom, Diocese of Sunyani, Bono Region, Ghana
- Died: 28 December 2001 (aged 74) Potroase, Eastern Region Ghana

Styles of James Kwadwo Owusu
- Reference style: Your Lordship; The Most Reverend
- Spoken style: His Lordship
- Religious style: Bishop

James Kwadwo Owusu (19 December 1927 – 28 December 2001) was a Ghanaian Catholic prelate who was the bishop of the Roman Catholic Diocese of Sunyani in Ghana from 1 March 1973 until his death on 28 December 2001. Before that, from 8 December 1956 until he was appointed bishop, he was a priest of the same Catholic diocese. He was appointed bishop on 1 March 1973 by Pope Paul VI. He was consecrated and installed at Sunyani, Ghana on 30 June 1973. He died in an automobile accident on 28 December 2001, while still in office.

== Background ==
James Kwadwo Owusu was born on 19 December 1927 in Kwasibuokrom, Diocese of Sunyani, Bono Region (part of the erstwhile Brong-Ahafo Region), Ghana. He studied philosophy and theology at seminary. He was ordained a priest on 8 December 1956.

== Priest ==
On 8 December 1956 he was ordained a Catholic priest. While priest, he served as Chaplain in the Ghanaian Military, at the rank of Major. He served as a priest until 1 March 1973.

== Bishop ==
On 1 March 1973, The Holy Father Pope Paul VI created the Roman Catholic Diocese of Sunyani by splitting the Diocese of Kumasi. On the same day The Holy Father appointed Reverend Father James Kwadwo Owusu of the clergy of Kumasi, as the first bishop of the new diocese.

He was consecrated bishop and installed at Sunyani on 30 June 1973 by the hands of Archbishop John Kodwo Amissah, Archbishop of Cape Coast assisted by Bishop Peter Kwasi Sarpong, Bishop of Kumasi and Bishop Peter Poreku Dery, Bishop of Wa.

== Death ==
In December 2001, Bishop James Kwadwo Owusu travelled by road to Accra to consult with his medical doctors. On the return journey to Sunyani, the car that was carrying him was involved in a head-on-collision with another vehicle. The prelate died on the spot from the injuries that he sustained in that accident. He was 74 years old.

== See also ==
- Catholic Church in Ghana

== Succession table ==
| Preceded by Diocese created | Bishop of Sunyani (1 March 1973 – 28 December 2001) | Succeeded by Matthew Kwasi Gyamfi (sincce 14 April 2003) |
