= Our Lady of Seven Sorrows Cathedral =

Our Lady of Seven Sorrows Cathedral, or Cathedral of Our Lady of Seven Sorrows, may refer to:

== China ==
- Our Lady of Seven Sorrows Cathedral, Ningbo
- Our Lady of Seven Sorrows Cathedral, Suzhou

== Congo ==
- Our Lady of Seven Sorrows Cathedral, Kisantu

== Ghana ==
- Cathedral Basilica of Our Lady of Seven Sorrows, Navrongo
