= Thomas Mensah =

Thomas Mensah may refer to:

- Thomas Mensah (engineer), Ghanaian-American chemical engineer and inventor
- Thomas Mensah (lawyer) (1932–2020), Ghanaian lawyer, judge and diplomat
- Thomas Kwaku Mensah (1935–2016), Roman Catholic archbishop
