= Bodwesango Senior High School =

Mixed second cycle institution in Bogwesango, Ashanti Region, Ghana

Coordinates: 6.286°N 1.419°W

- Bodwesango, Ashanti Region; Ghana

Information
- Type: secondary/high school
- Grades: Forms [1-3]

Bodwesango Senior High School is a mixed second cycle institution in Bodwesango in Adansi North District in the Ashanti Region of Ghana.

== History ==
In 2009, the school took part in the Inter-school debate under the topic: "Leaders are born but not made" where they emerged as the first runner-up.

== Former headteachers ==
- In 2011, Nana Osarfo Akowuah.
- In 2021, John Yaw Afoakwah was the Chaplain and tutor at the school.
