= Techiman Senior High School =

School in Techiman, Ghana

Coordinates: 7.56938°N 1.93729°W

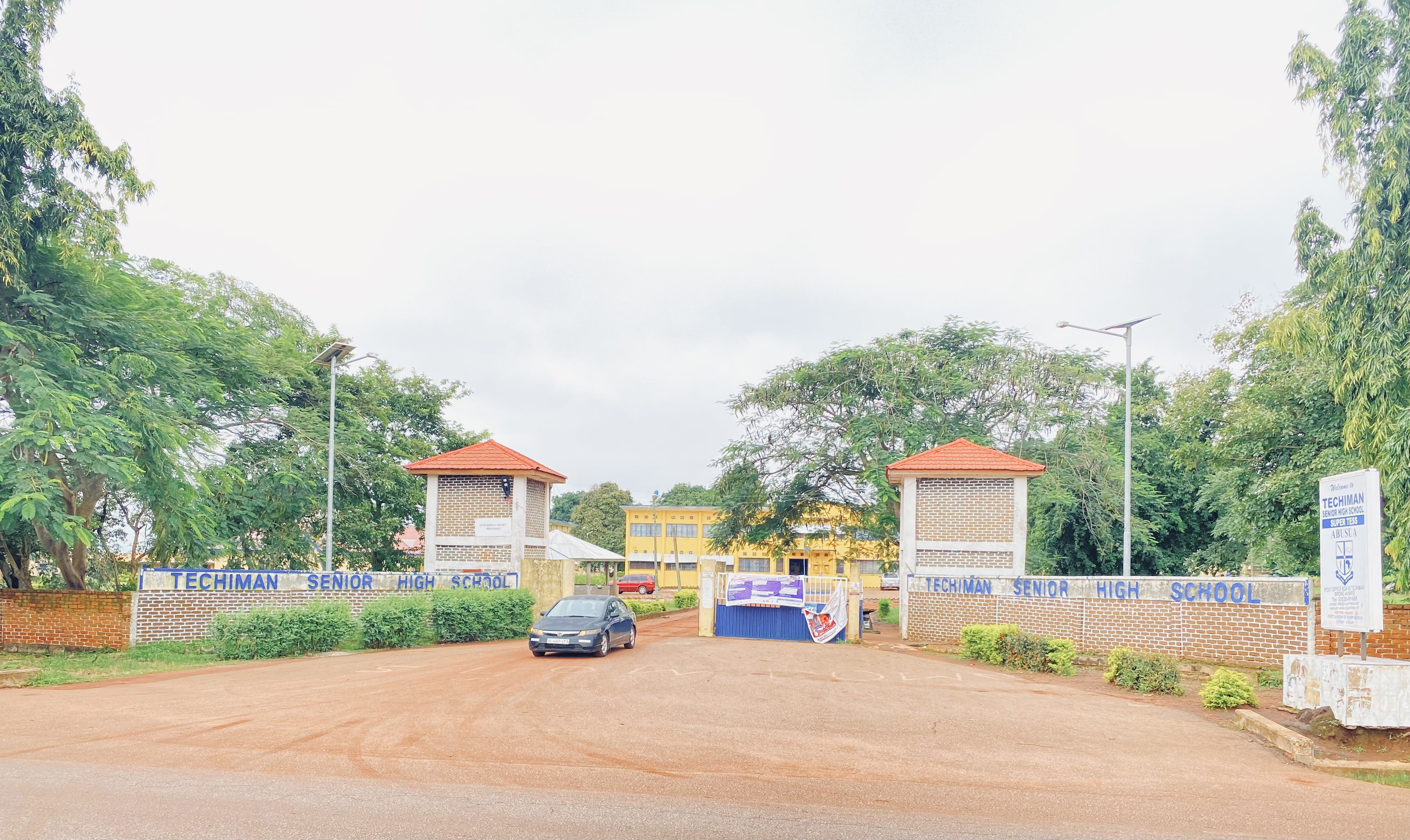
Main entrance of Techiman Senior High School

Techiman Senior High School is a second cycle co-education institution located in Techiman, Bono East Region of Ghana. It has its slogan to be SUPER TESS or Abusuafo.. It is a Grade B school.

== Establishment ==
Former president of Ghana, Kwame Nkrumah established the school in November 1963 under the Ghana Education Trust with 71 students of which 53 were boys and 18 were girls.

== Enrollment ==
As of 2013, the school had a student population of about 2,786 which consisted of 1671 boys and 1115 girls.

== Notable alumni ==
- Kwadwo Asare-Baffour Acheampong(KABA), Ghanaian journalist

== Headmasters ==
- Moses Kofi Boakye (2013-2016)
- Jacob Afful (2016–present)
