= William Porter (bishop) =

English Roman Catholic bishop (1887–1966)

William Thomas Porter SMA
- Archbishop of Cape Coast
- Church: Catholic Church
- Archdiocese: Archdiocese of Cape Coast
- In office: 25 April 1933 – 15 May 1959
- Predecessor: Ernest Hauger
- Successor: John Kodwo Amissah
- Other post: Titular Archbishop of Lemnus (1959-1966)
- Previous posts: Titular Bishop of Urusi (1933-1950); Prefect of Northern Nigeria (1930-1933)

Orders
- Ordination: 9 October 1915 by Daniel Cohalan
- Consecration: 10 September 1933 by Richard Downey

Personal details
- Born: 14 May 1887 Halsall, Lancashire, United Kingdom of Great Britain and Ireland
- Died: 16 June 1966 (aged 79)

William Thomas Porter SMA (14 May 1887 – 16 June 1966) was an English Catholic prelate who served as Vicar Apostolic of Gold Coast and later Archbishop of Cape Coast in present-day Ghana from 1933 to 1959. He previously served as Vicar Apostolic of Northern Nigeria from 1930 to 1933. He was a member of the Society of African Missions.

== Career ==
Porter entered the Society of African Missions in 1915 and was ordained in 1918. He served as Vicar Apostolic of Northern Nigeria (now the Archdiocese of Kaduna) from 1930 to 25 April 1933.

=== Episcopacy ===
Porter became Apostolic Vicar of Cape Coast in 1933 and titular bishop of Urusi. In 1936, Porter established a Catholic secondary school, St. Augustine's College in Cape Coast. He also established several Catholic youth groups.

He became an archbishop when the diocese was raised to an archdiocese on 18 Apr 1950. He retired as archbishop on 15 May 1959, when he was appointed Titular Archbishop of Lemnus. Ported died in 1966.
