= Diocese of Techiman =

Roman Catholic diocese in Ghana

Coordinates: 7.5837°N 1.9358°W

Diocese of Techiman Dioecesis Techimanensis

Location
- Country: Ghana
- Metropolitan: Kumasi

Statistics
- Area: 22,400 km^{2} (8,600 sq mi)
- Population: Total; Catholics: (as of 2007); 695,826; 79,645 (11.4%)

Information
- Rite: Latin Rite
- Cathedral: Cathedral of St. Paul

Current leadership
- Pope: Leo XIV
- Bishop: Dominic Nyarko Yeboah

The Roman Catholic Diocese of Techiman (Latin: Techimanen(sis)) is a diocese located in the city of Techiman in the ecclesiastical province of Kumasi in Ghana.

== History ==
- 28 December 2007: Established as the Diocese of Techiman from the Diocese of Sunyani and Diocese of Konongo–Mampong

== Leadership ==
- Bishops of Techiman (Roman rite)
  - Bishop Dominic Nyarko Yeboah (since 28 December 2007)
