= Diocese of Goaso =

Latin Catholic jurisdiction in Ghana

Coordinates: 6.8014°N 2.5156°W

Diocese of Goaso Dioecesis Goasonensis

Location
- Country: Ghana
- Ecclesiastical province: Kumasi

Statistics
- Area: 6,654 km^{2} (2,569 sq mi)
- Population: Total; Catholics: (as of 2004); 557,016; 55,857 (10.0%)

Information
- Denomination: Catholic Church
- Sui iuris church: Latin Church
- Rite: Roman Rite

Current leadership
- Pope: Leo XIV
- Bishop: Peter Kwaku Atuahene

The Diocese of Goaso (Latin: Goasonen(sis)) is a diocese located in the city of Goaso in the ecclesiastical province of Kumasi in Ghana.

== History ==
- October 24, 1997: Established as Diocese of Goaso from the Diocese of Sunyani

== Special churches ==
The Cathedral is Cathedral of St. Anthony in Goaso.

== Leadership ==
- Bishops of Goaso
  - Bishop Peter Kwaku Atuahene (since 24 October 1997)

== See also ==
- Roman Catholicism in Ghana

== Sources ==
- GCatholic.org
- Catholic Hierarchy
