= Bodwesango =

- Village
- Location within Ghana
- Coordinates: 6°16′N 1°25′W
- Country: Ghana
- Region: Ashanti Region
- District: Adansi North District
- Elevation: 669 ft (204 m)
- Time zone: GMT
  - Summer (DST): GMT

Bodwesango is a village in the Adansi North district, a district in the Ashanti Region of Ghana.

== Education ==
Bodwesango is known for the Bodwesango Senior High School. The school is a second cycle institution.

== Healthcare ==
The Saint Louis General Hospital is located in Bodwesango.
