= San Liborio, Rome =

St. Liborius
- San Liborio (in Italian); S. Liborii (in Latin)
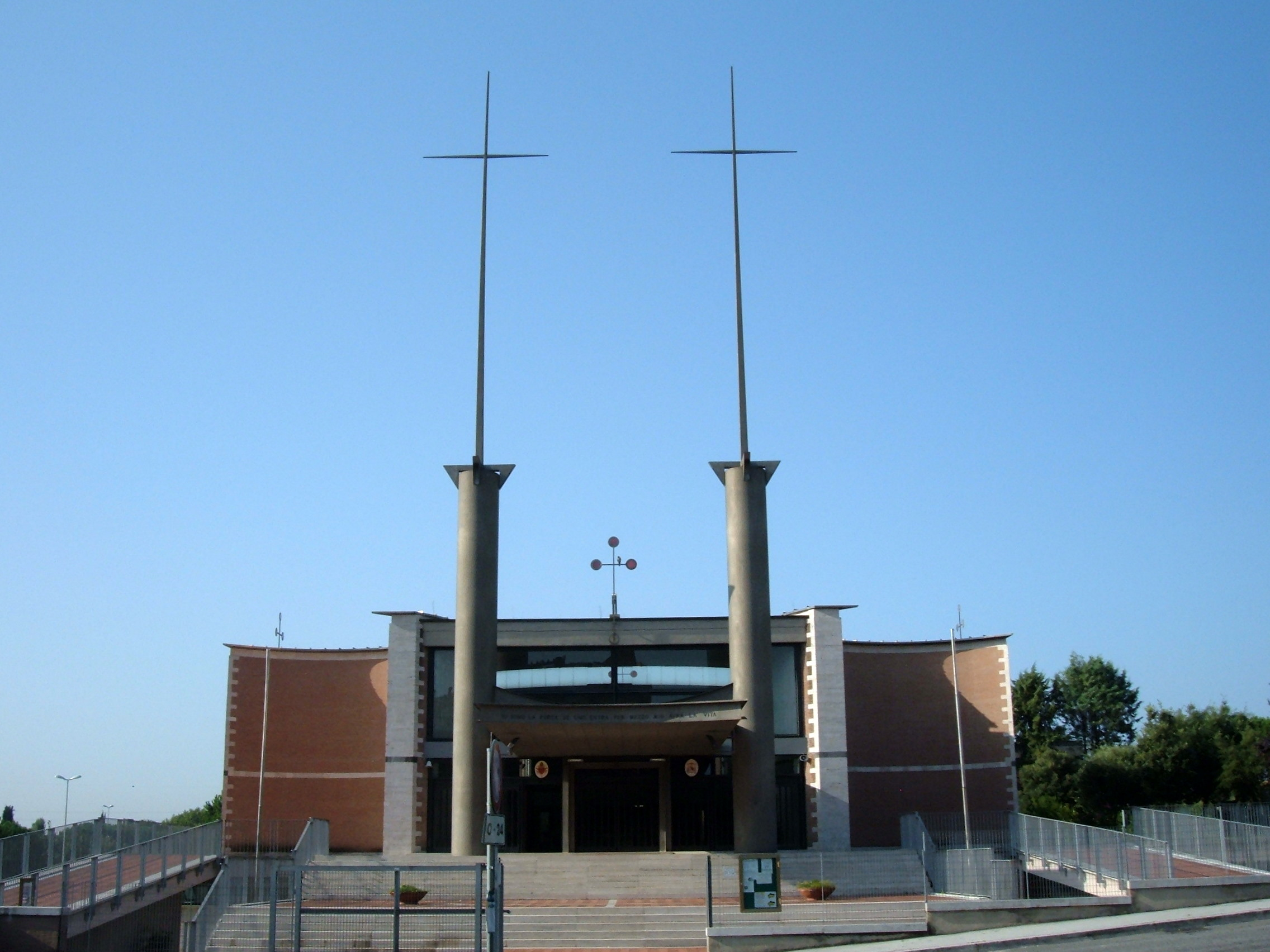
- Facade
- Click on the map for a fullscreen view
- 41°56′33″N 12°34′03″E
- Location: Via Tino Buazzelli 70, Rome
- Country: Italy
- Denomination: Roman Catholic
- Tradition: Roman Rite
- Website: Official website, not encrypted

History
- Status: Titular church
- Dedication: Liborius of Le Mans

Architecture
- Architect: Ennio Canino
- Architectural type: Church
- Style: Modern
- Groundbreaking: 1965

Administration
- District: Lazio
- Province: Rome

The church of San Liborio is a church in Rome, in the district Ponte Mammolo, in Via Diego Fabbri.

Designed by architect Ennio Canino, it was built in the late 1990s and inaugurated 7 November 1998.

The parish was erected on 28 May 1965 with the decree Neminem fugit, issued by the Cardinal Vicar Luigi Traglia, and entrusted to the secular priests of the Institute of Sodales Priests. Originally the parish was dedicated to St. Mary of the Purification. On 2 December 1996, by decree of Cardinal Camillo Ruini, it assumed its current name.

It was instituted a cardinal's titular church by Pope John Paul II 21 February 2001.

It is dedicated to Saint Liborius, who was bishop of Le Mans (Cenomanus) from 348 to 397.

== List of Cardinal Protectors ==
- Johannes Joachim Degenhardt (21 February 2001 – 25 July 2002)
- Peter Kodwo Appiah Turkson (21 October 2003 – present)
