= Techiman =

City in Bono East Region, Ghana

Techiman Takyiman (Akan)
- City
- Location of Techiman in Bono East Region, Ghana
- Coordinates: 7°35′00″N 1°56′10″W
- Country: Ghana
- Region: Bono East Region
- District: Techiman Metropolitan District
- Founded: 1740

Government
  - Type: Mayor–council
  - Metropolitan Mayor: Benjamin Yaw Gyarko

Population (2010)
  - Total: 67,241
  - Ethnicities: Akan; Bono; Gonja; Dagomba; Sisala; Mamprusi
  - Religion: Christianity; Islam; traditional African religions
- Time zone: GMT
  - Summer (DST): GMT
- Postal codes: BT
- Area code: 035 25
- Climate: Aw
- Website: tecma.gov.gh

Techiman (Akan: Takyiman) is a city and the capital of the Techiman Metropolitan District and the Bono East Region of Ghana. The city is located about 32 miles (51 km) from Sunyani and about 65 miles (105 km) away from Kumasi. It has a tropical savanna climate, experiencing two wet seasons and a dry season. Techiman has a population of 67,241 as of the 2010 census figures released by the Ghana Statistical Service. The majority of ethnic groups in the city included the Akan, Bono, Gonja, Dagomba, Sisala, and Mamprusi people. The mayor of the city's metropolitan, as of 2021, is Benjamin Yaw Gyarko.

The city was founded in 1740, and was established as the Bono-Tekyiman state in the 1940s, after the Bono state's capital Bono Manso was taken over in 1723 by the Asante Empire. After a referendum in 2018 was passed with the focus of creating new regions in Ghana, Techiman was selected to be the capital of the newly-created region of the Bono East Region.

Techiman is the site of an outdoor agricultural market, one of the largest markets in West Africa. The market is also where most of the city's economic activity is situated. The city holds a unique ethnic heritage as the center of the Akan people. Techiman is also a commercial hub in Ghana, as it is the cross point of many different trunk roads from cities such as Sunyani, Kumasi, Wa, and Tamale.

== History ==
=== Bono-Tekyiman ===
The town of Techiman used to be a part of the Bono state. After Bono Manso, capital of the Bono state, was destroyed by the Asante Empire in 1723 during the Asante-Bono war, the capital was moved to Techiman in 1740, which ruled a much-reduced kingdom under Asante sovereignty. As a vassal, Techiman joined the Asante in wars against Gonja in 1802, Gyaman in 1818, and Ewe in the 1860s.

After the Third Anglo–Asante War, a confederation of Brong states led by Gyaman which included Techiman attempted to secede from the empire with British protection. In 1877, Techiman was destroyed, with the population fleeing to Gyaman. Only in 1896 were did Asantehene Prempeh I allow them to return.

Between 1896 and 1901 Techiman and the other Brong states were part of the Asante 'protectorate', but were administered separately by the British. Techiman regained control of several villages that had been taken by the Asante in 1723. A series of colonial reorganizations, however, brought Techiman back under the Asantehene's purview.

Techiman joined the Asante Confederacy Council of chiefs in April 1936, but the Techimanhene quickly found that the council would not be the free association of states that he expected. Techiman, along with Dormaa, Drobo, Abease, Suma-Ahenkro and Antepim-Domase, seceded from the Confederacy in 1952.

=== Present ===
A referendum in 2018 was passed with the focus of creating new regions in Ghana, which resulted in Techiman being selected as the capital of the newly created Bono East Region.

== Geography ==
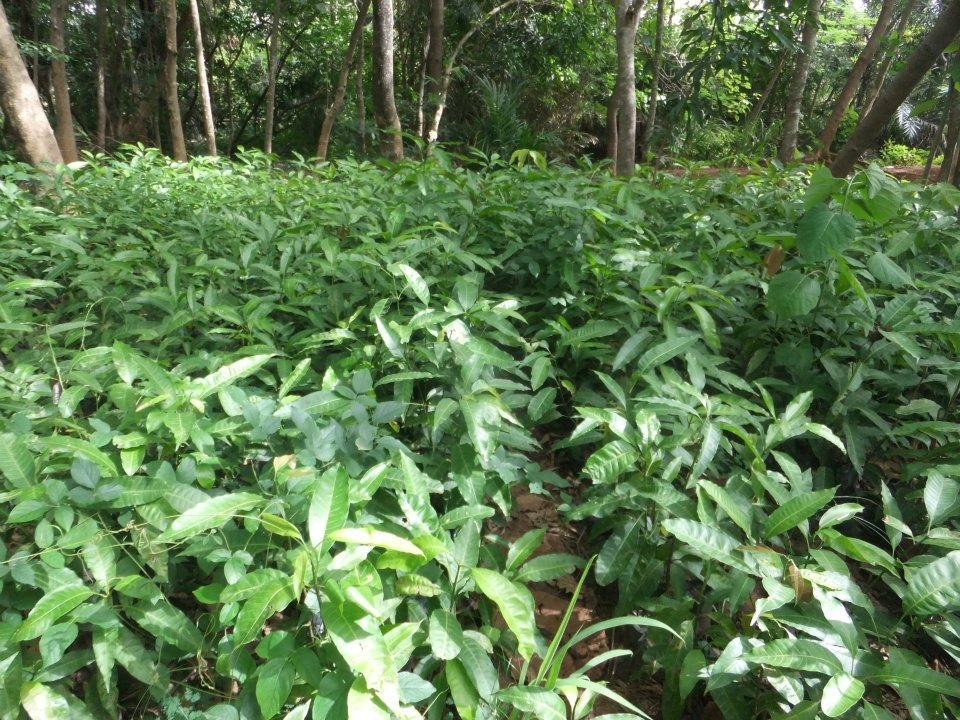
Tree nursery in Techiman

Techiman is located at coordinates 7°35′00″N 1°56′10″W and is about 32 miles (51 km) from Sunyani and about 65 miles (105 km) away from Kumasi.

=== Metropolitan area ===
Techiman is located in the Techiman Metropolitan District, which has a land area of 649.0714 square kilometres (250.6079 sq mi). The metropolitan is bordered by four districts: the Techiman North District, the Wenchi Municipal District, the Nkronza Municipalities (Nkoranza North District and Nkoranza South Municipal District) and the Offinso North District.

=== Climate ===
The city has a tropical savanna climate (Köppen climate classification Aw), characterized by two wet seasons and a dry season. The major wet season usually occurs between April and July and the minor one beginning from September to October. The only dry season occurs from November, lasting until March in the following year. The city's experiencing moderate to heavy rainfall annually, with its annual rainfall ranging from 1,260 to 1,660 millimetres (50 to 65 in). The average temperature in the city is 28 °C (82 °F) with a relative humidity of around 75–80% in the rainy season and 70–72% for the remaining year.

Climate data for Techiman(1991–2021)
Month	Jan	Feb	Mar	Apr	May	Jun	Jul	Aug	Sep	Oct	Nov	Dec	Year
Mean daily maximum °C (°F)	33.8 (92.8)	34.3 (93.8)	33.5 (92.3)	32.3 (90.2)	31.1 (88.0)	29.2 (84.5)	27.9 (82.3)	27.8 (82.0)	28.4 (83.2)	29.4 (85.0)	30.8 (87.4)	32.6 (90.7)	30.9 (87.7)
Mean daily minimum °C (°F)	21.3 (70.3)	22.8 (73.1)	23.6 (74.4)	23.6 (74.4)	23.1 (73.6)	22.2 (71.9)	21.6 (70.8)	21.4 (70.6)	21.6 (70.8)	22.4 (72.3)	22.0 (71.6)	21.3 (70.4)	22.2 (72.0)
Average precipitation mm (inches)	23 (0.9)	51 (2.0)	112 (4.4)	137 (5.4)	138 (5.4)	133 (5.2)	119 (4.7)	128 (5.0)	192 (7.6)	163 (6.4)	76 (3.0)	26 (1.0)	1,298 (51)
Source: Climate-data.org

== Government ==
The metropolitan has a mayor–council form of government. The mayor (executive chief) is appointed by the president of Ghana and approved by the city council, the Techiman Metropolitan Assembly. The current mayor of the metropolitan as of 2021 is Benjamin Yaw Gyarko.

== Demography ==
As of the 2010 census released by the Ghana Statistical Service, Techiman has a population of 67,241 people. About 95% of the population is religious, where about 69.5% are Christian, 27.4% are Islamic, and 0.9% are traditionalists. The majority of ethnic groups in the city consists of the Akans, Bono, Gonjas, Dagombas, Sisalas and Mamprusis.

== Cityscape ==
Due to the city's rapid growth as a result of its location and commercial importance, there has been an intense need for land and housing. Although, there are more homes being built than any other time periods in the country's history. Most property in Techiman is owned by traditional chiefs.

There has been a decline of compound housing and the increase of detached housing in the city, which could be attributed to the rise of detached housing across Ghana. One exception is Takofiano, a low-income community of both indigenes and migrants located in Techiman dominated by compound housing. The situation is entirely different in Hansua, a high-income peri-urban community where detached housing is the norm. The community used to be farmland which has now being redevelop for the wealthy households in Techiman.

A Cattle farmer/trader from Takofiano explained how long building in Techiman takes due to issues relating to financing.

I started [building a structure] in 1996 and two years ago (2023) I completed it [construction spanned a period of 26 years]. Funds used in putting up this structure [house] were sourced from my work [savings and incomes] and then more recently funds received from my son who is now a teacher based in Kumasi. When I started the building, my son was a little child, and it’s taken all these years to now complete it.

== Economy ==
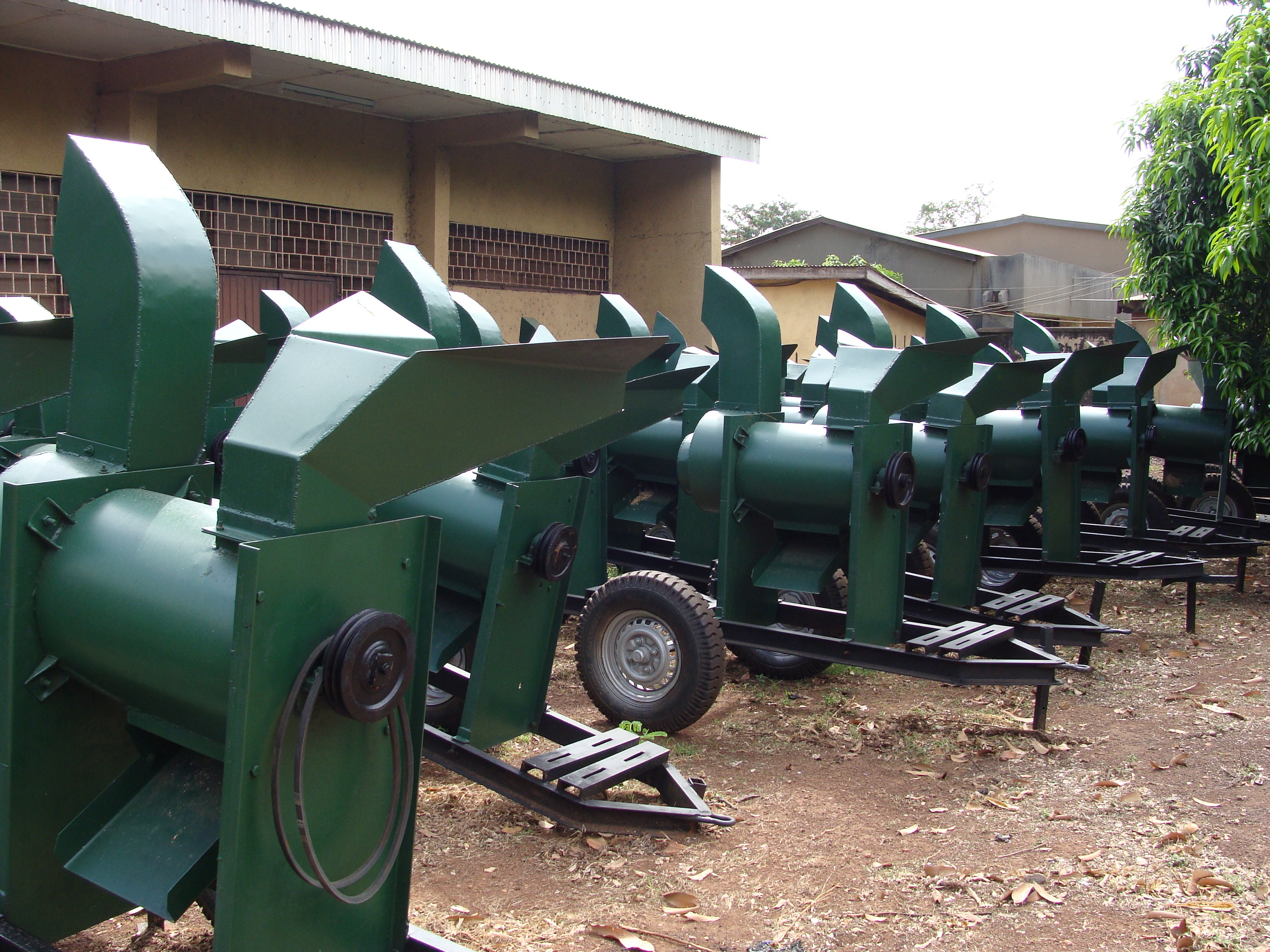
Farm equipment in Techiman

The dominated employing economic sector is agriculture (36%), followed by service and sales (28.2%). The city's economy is mostly rural.

=== Agriculture ===
Agriculture is the highest employing economic sector in the city, with about 36% of the population employed in the sector and about 44% of households in the city producing crops and/or raising livestock. About 48%, or less than half of the city, is considered to be food secure, while the rest of the population experienced mild to severe food insecurity. Also, one in five households in Techiman experiences severe food insecurity.

A significant share of land used for agriculture is in the control of the government. Farming in the city has the purpose of improving land use, while in other cities in Ghana such as Tamale, farming is motivated by commercial gains and consumption of goods.

=== Trade ===
The majority of traders are located in Techiman market, which had seen increased marketing of food items primarily contributed to its female traders. Most of the city's economic activity is situated in the market, where it is a centre for the trading of food amenities such as plantains, cassava, grains, and yams, which is what the Techiman market is renowned for. The market, one of the largest in the country and in West Africa, provides 70% of the metropolitan's revenues in the city. Overall, prices at the market during non-drought years are more variable than the prices in Bolgatanga and Cape Coast, which places the city in a good position to stabilize prices through internal trade.

=== Non-governmental organizations ===
Agrico Hub, a NGO which empowers young people to utilize digital media for innovation, partnered up with Ghana Tech Lab to organized a six-week digital media start-up summit in Techiman in 2021. Another NGO, the Rural Initiators and Motivators Development Association (RIMDA), has a branch in Techiman which specializes in social development of rural and deprived urban dwellers.

== Culture ==
=== Sports ===
Techiman is home to three football clubs: Techiman Eleven Wonders, Ampem Darkoa Ladies F.C., and Techiman City FC. All three teams play at the Ohene Ameyaw Stadium, although the Techiman Eleven Wonders were banned from playing in the stadium for the 2020–21 Ghana Premier League season due to concerns related to the virus COVID-19.

== Education ==
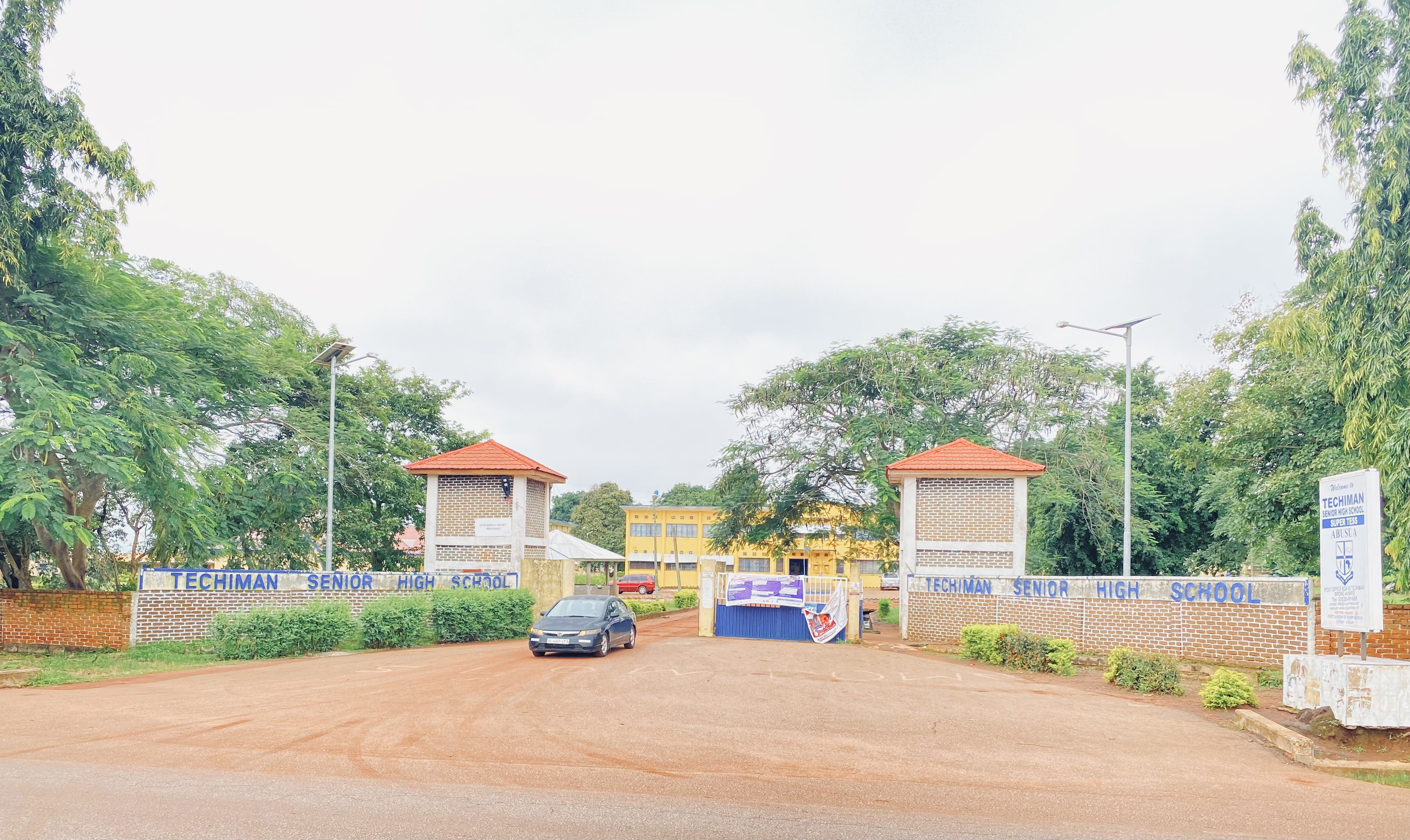
Techiman Senior High School

Techiman is home to the Techiman Senior High School, established on 1 November 1963 as a part of Kwame Nkrumah's Ghana Education Trust Fund with support from then Omanhene of Techiman, Nana Kwakye Ameyaw II.

== Healthcare ==
Healthcare in Techiman is administered by the Regional Health Directorate (RHD), directed by Dr. Fred Adomako. The lead hospital in the region is the Techiman Holy Family Hospital, established in 1954 by the Medical Mission Sisters owned and operated by the Diocese of Techiman. The city has one of the best National Health Insurance Schemes in the country, with the Meli-med Clinic and the Techiman Health Centre awarded the best clinic and the latter as the best health centre.

== Transport ==
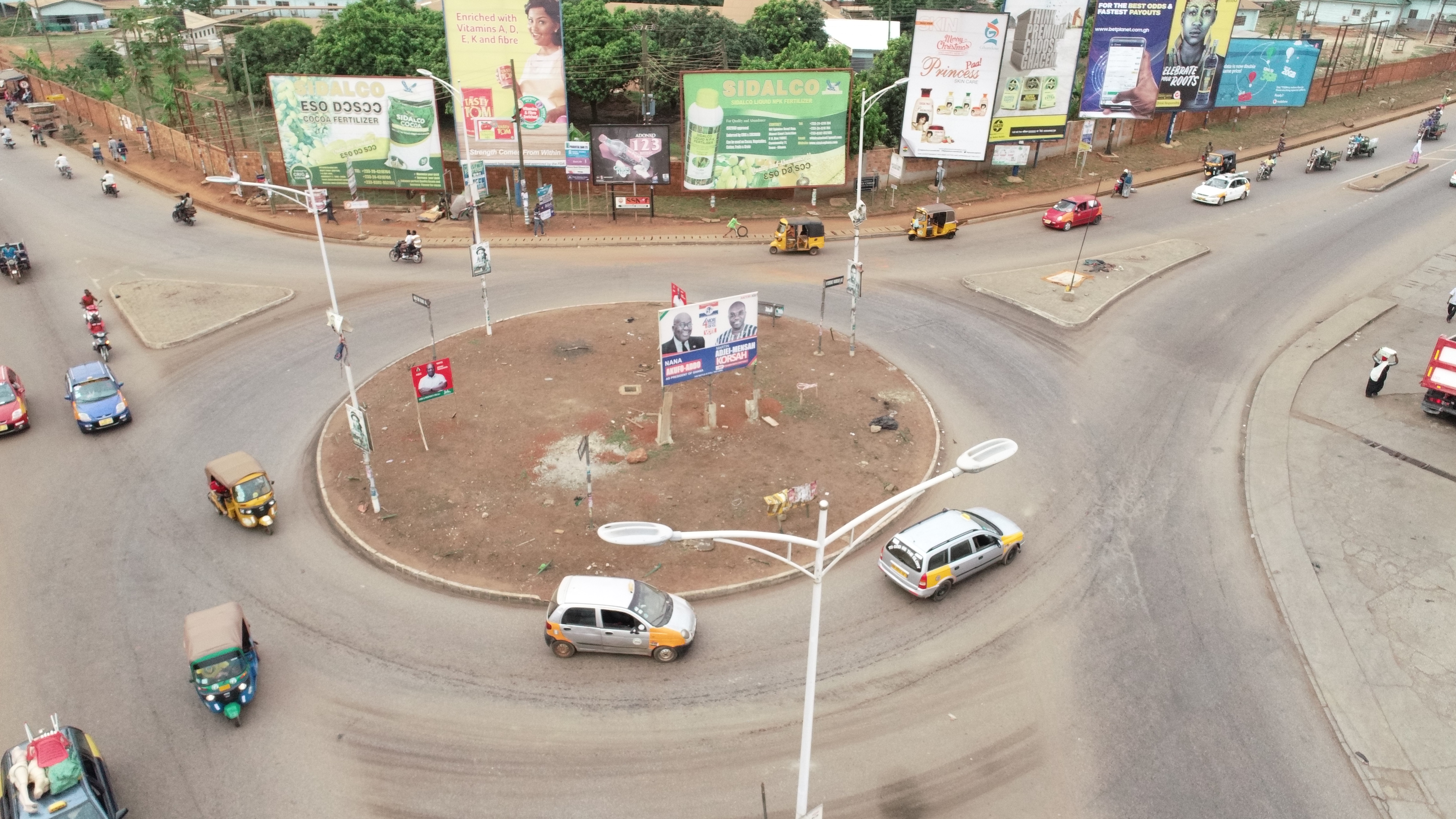
A roundabout in Techiman

Techiman is an all-around bustling commercial centre, due to trunk roads from Sunyani, Kumasi, Wa and Tamale all meeting at the city. The main road passing through Techiman is the N10. Due to the good state that the road is in, trade between the cities of Bolgatanga, Tamale, and Kumasi is high.

== International relations ==
=== Sister cities – twin towns ===
Techiman, in partnership with nearby Sunyani, currently has a sister city relationship with:

- Tuscaloosa, Alabama (2011)

== Notable people ==
- Kamaldeen Sulemana, professional footballer
- Martin Kwaku Adjei-Mensah Korsah, politician
- Haminu Draman, professional footballer
- KABA, radio presenter

== See also ==
- Sunyani
- List of cities in Ghana
- Roman Catholic Diocese of Techiman

== Work cited ==
Governmental

- 2010 Population & Housing Census (PDF). Ghana Statistical Service (Report). Techiman Municipality. 2014.

Journals

- Arhin, Kwame (1979). A Profile of Brong Kyempim: Essays on the Archaeology, History, Language and Politics of the Brong Peoples of Ghana. Monograph. Institute of Development Studies and Partner Organisations.
- Renckens, E. (2012). "Decentralization of Ghana". Agora Journal of Urban Planning and Design. Taubman College of Architecture and Urban Planning. hdl:2027.42/120392.
- Warren, D. M. (1976). "The Use and Misuse of Ethnohistorical Data in the Reconstruction of Techiman-Bono (Ghana) History". Ethnohistory. 23 (4). JSTOR 481652.
