= St Peter's Cathedral Basilica, Kumasi =

Roman Catholic cathedral and basilica in Kumasi, Ghana

Coordinates: 6.6952°N 1.6180°W

St. Peter's Cathedral Basilica, Kumasi
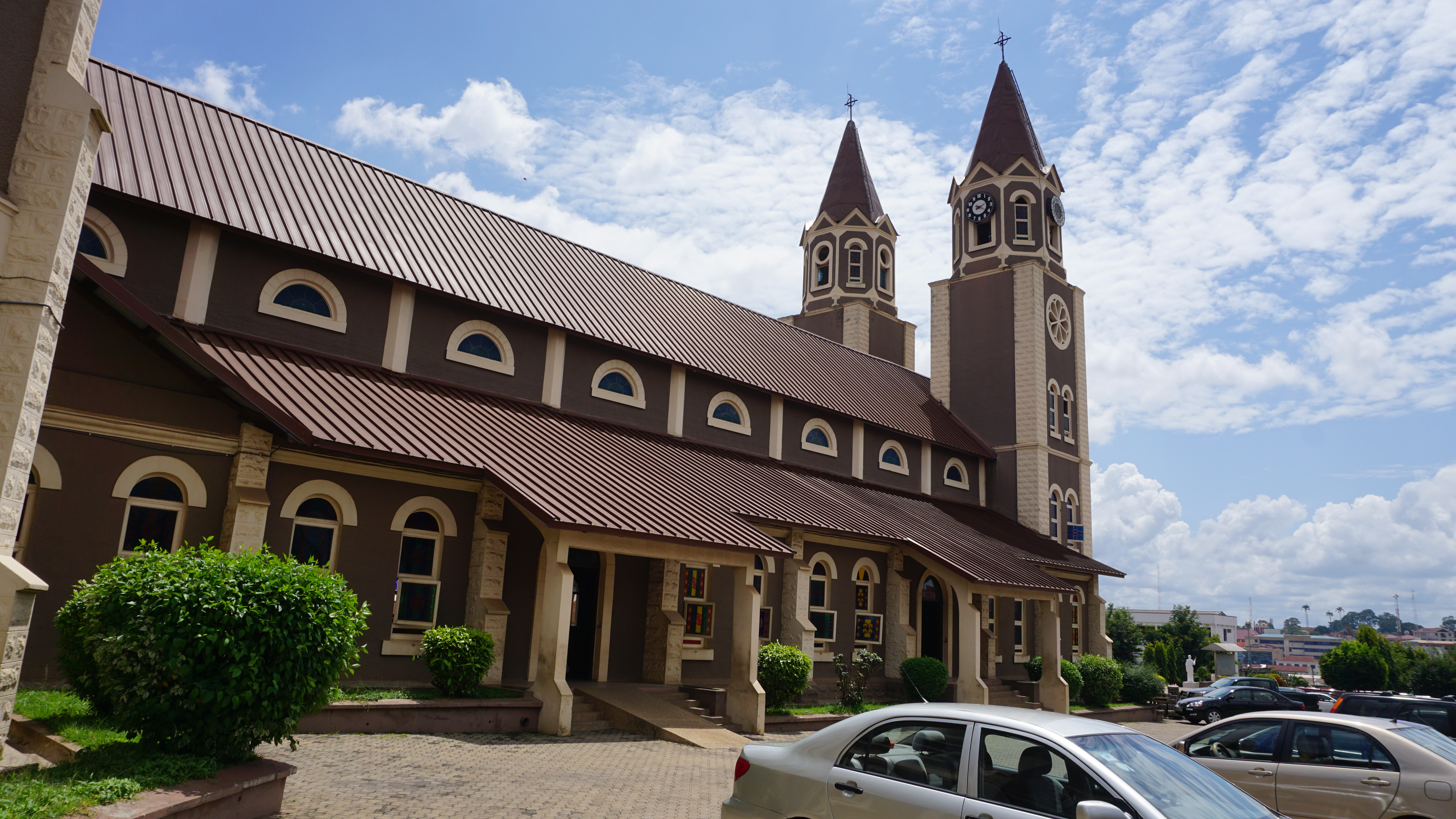

Religion
- Affiliation: Roman Catholic Church
- Ecclesiastical or organizational status: Minor basilica
- Year consecrated: 2004

Location
- Location: Kumasi, Ashanti Region, Ghana
- Interactive map of St. Peter's Cathedral Basilica, Kumasi
- Territory: Archdiocese of Kumasi

The St. Peter's Cathedral Basilica is a Roman Catholic cathedral and basilica dedicated to Saint Peter located in Kumasi, Ghana. The church is the seat of the Archdiocese of Kumasi. The church was dedicated on 2 June 2004.
