= Our Lady of Seven Sorrows Cathedral, Kisantu =

Our Lady of Seven Sorrows Cathedral
- Cathédrale Notre Dame des Sept Douleurs
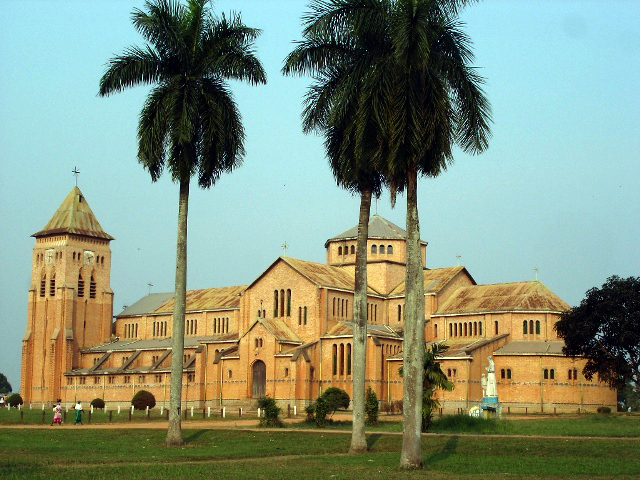
- Our Lady of Seven Sorrows Cathedral
- 5.1255°S 15.0820°E
- Location: Kisantu
- Country: Democratic Republic of the Congo
- Denomination: Roman Catholic Church

The Our Lady of Seven Sorrows Cathedral (French: Cathédrale Notre Dame des Sept Douleurs) or just Kisantu Cathedral is a religious building belonging to the Catholic Church located in the town of Kisantu, 120 kilometres (75 mi) south of Kinshasa, the capital of the African country of Democratic Republic of the Congo.

The building Tuscan-inspired was built between 1926 and 1936 and previously worked there the old mission of Belgian Jesuits in Lower Congo established in 1893. Now the temple follows the Roman or Latin rite and serves as the headquarters of the Roman Catholic Diocese of Kisantu (Dioecesis Kisantuensis) which was created in 1959 by Pope John XXIII with the bull Cum parvulum.

In 2011, he finished his last restoration. It is one of the main attractions of the city along with the Botanical Garden of Kisantu.

== See also ==
- Roman Catholicism in the Democratic Republic of the Congo
- Cathedral Basilica of Our Lady of Seven Sorrows
