= Wiaga =

Coordinates: 10°40′N 1°16′W

- Town
- Location within Ghana
- Region: Upper East Region
- District: Builsa District

Wiaga is a town in the Builsa District of the Upper East Region of Ghana.
