= Diocese of Obuasi =

Roman Catholic diocese in Ghana

Coordinates: 6.1998°N 1.6687°W

Diocese of Obuasi Dioecesis Konongensis-Mamponganus

Location
- Country: Ghana
- Metropolitan: Kumasi

Statistics
- Area: 6,350 km^{2} (2,450 sq mi)
- Population: Total; Catholics: (as of 2004); 934,808; 93,687 (10.0%)

Information
- Rite: Latin Rite

Current leadership
- Pope: Leo XIV
- Bishop: John Yaw Afoakwah

The Roman Catholic Diocese of Obuasi (Latin: Obuasien(sis)) is a diocese located in the city of Obuasi in the ecclesiastical province of Kumasi in Ghana.

== History ==
- March 3, 1995: Established as Diocese of Obuasi from the Diocese of Kumasi

== Special churches ==
The Cathedral is Cathedral of St. Thomas in Obuasi.

== Leadership ==
- Bishops of Obuasi (Roman rite)
  - Bishop Thomas Kwaku Mensah (March 3, 1995 - March 26, 2008), appointed Archbishop of Kumasi
  - Bishop Gabriel Justice Yaw Anokye (March 26, 2008 - May 15, 2012), appointed Archbishop of Kumasi
  - Bishop John Yaw Afoakwah (sibce 22 November 2014)

== See also ==
- Roman Catholicism in Ghana

== Sources ==
- GCatholic.org
- Catholic Hierarchy
