= Wamanafo =

Coordinates: 7°16′N 2°43′W

- Interactive map of Wamanafo
- Country: Ghana
- Region: Bono Region

Wamanafo is a town in the Bono region of Ghana. The town is known for the Wamanafo Commercial Day Secondary Technical School. The school is a second cycle institution.
