= Catholic University College of Ghana =

Ghanaian private university

Coordinates: 7.3537°N 2.3879°W

Catholic University College of Ghana, Fiapre
- Catholic University College of Ghana, Fiapre logo
- Motto: Scientiae Ac Sapientiae Lumen Splendeat. Translation: "May the Light of Knowledge and Wisdom Shine Forth"
- Type: Private
- Established: 3 March 2003; 23 years ago
- Affiliations: University of Ghana, University of Cape Coast, Boston College, Catholic University of America, Saint Mary's University
- Chancellor: Cardinal Peter Kodwo Appiah Turkson
- President: Prof. Daniels Obeng-Ofori
- Location: Catholic University College of Ghana, Fiapre, P.O.Box 363, Sunyani, Bono, Region, Fiapre, Sunyani, Bono Region, Ghana
- Website: www.cug.edu.gh

The Catholic University College of Ghana is a private universities in Ghana. It is located at Fiapre, Sunyani in the Bono Region. It was granted accreditation by the National Accreditation Board on 4 December 2002. The first class began instruction on 3 March 2003. The formal inauguration of the university was on 13 November 2003.

== Organization ==
=== Departments ===
Faculty of Economics and Business Administration (EBA)

- Department of Economics
- Department of Accounting and Finance
- Department of Management
- Entrepreneurship and Innovative Center

Faculty of Education

- Department of Arts and Education
- Department of Social Science Education
- Department of Science and Mathematics Education

Faculty of Information and Communication Sciences & Technology (ICST)

- Department of Computing and Information Sciences
- Department of Decision Sciences and Applied Mathematics
- Department of Communication Sciences and Multi-Media Studies

Faculty of Health and Allied Sciences (HAS)

- Department of Public Health
- Department of Nursing
- Department of Applied Sciences

Faculty of Religions and Social Sciences (RSS)

- Department of Religious Studies
- Department of Social Sciences
- Department of Languages

=== Faculty of Economic and Business Administration ===
This faculty runs programmes leading to the award of the following degrees.

- Bsc Accounting
- BSc Banking and Finance
- BSc Economics
- Bsc Human Resource Management
- BSc Management
- BSc Management and Organisational Development
- Bsc Marketing
- BSc Procurement and Supply Chain Management

POSTGRADUATE PROGRAMS

- MBA Accounting
- MBA Finance
- MBA Human Resource Management
- MBA Marketing

=== Faculty of Information and Communication Sciences and Technology ===
This faculty has produced four-year programmes leading to a

- Bsc in Actuarial Science
- BSc in Computer Science.
- Bsc in Information Technology
- Bsc in Mathematics with Economics

=== Faculty of Religions and Social Sciences ===
- BA Religious Studies
- Certificate in English Language
- Certificate in French Language
- M.A Religious Studies and Pastoral Ministry

=== Faculty of Health and Allied Sciences ===
This faculty has produced four-year programmes leading to a

- Bsc in General Nursing
- BSc in Public Health ( Health Management Option, Health Informatics Option, Health Education Option)
- Mphil Public Health
- Msc Public Health

=== Faculty of Education ===
- Bachelor of Education in Accounting (BEd Accounting)
- Bachelor of Education in English (BEd English)
- Bachelor of Education in Computer Science (BEd Computer Science)
- Bachelor of Education in Geography (BEd Geography)
- Bachelor of Education in Mathematics (BEd Mathematics)
- Bachelor of Education in Religious Studies (BEd Religious Studies)
- Diploma in Basic Education for Non-Degree holders
- One-Year Postgraduate Diploma in Education (PGDE) for Degree Holders
- Post-graduate Diploma in Education

=== The Centre for Applied Research, Consultancy and Community Outreach ===
The centre promotes research within the university and be a creative link with the local communities.

== Affiliations ==
The university has a number of affiliations with other educational institutions.

- University of Ghana
- University of Cape Coast, Ghana
- Boston College, Boston, Massachusetts, USA
- Catholic University of America, Washington, DC, USA
- Saint Mary's University, Halifax, Nova Scotia, Canada

== See also ==
- List of universities in Ghana
