= Cathedral Basilica of Our Lady of Seven Sorrows, Navrongo =

Church building in Navrongo, Ghana

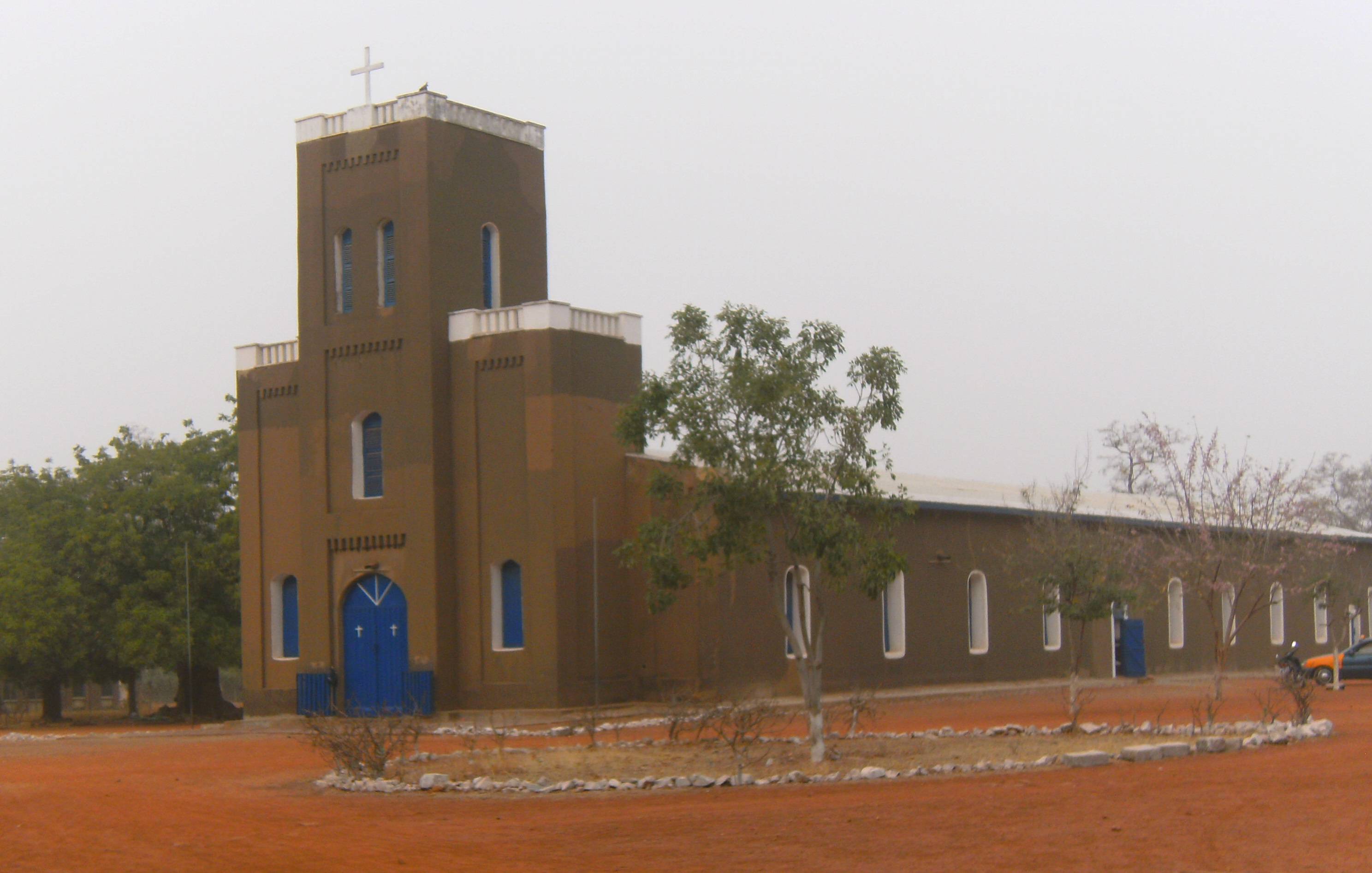
- Navrongo Cathedral outside
- Interactive map of the Cathedral Basilica of Our Lady of Seven Sorrows, Navrongo area

General information
- Location: Navrongo, Upper East Region, Ghana
- Coordinates: 10.8842°N 1.0779°W
- Completed: 1906

The Cathedral Basilica of Our Lady of Seven Sorrows is a Roman Catholic cathedral and basilica dedicated to the Blessed Virgin Mary located in Navrongo, Upper East Region, Ghana. The basilica is the seat of the Diocese of Navrongo–Bolgatanga. The church was dedicated on May 17, 2006. Its elevation to a minor basilica on May 17, 2006, by the Vatican was a formal recognition of its exceptional historical, artistic, and pastoral significance, not just for Ghana but for the global Catholic Church. The church has existed for many years and counts as one of the oldest churches in Ghana.

Navrongo Cathedral, as it is now known, was built in 1906 and expanded in 1920. Originally called "Our Lady of Seven Sorrows," the construction was overseen by the White Fathers. The walls are made of mud (therefore, it is also called "Mud Cathedral"), and wooden beams form the roof. On the inside, the walls are decorated with animal forms, scenes of everyday life, and Christian themes such as the Last Supper and the Bethlehem scene in the entrance area.

The site of the cathedral also contains a grotto and accommodation facilities.

== Historical Foundations: The Arrival of the White Fathers ==
The cathedral's story begins with the arrival of the Missionaries of Africa, commonly known as the White Fathers, in the early 20th century. The first missionaries, Fathers Oscar Morin and Eugene Lutz, arrived in Navrongo in 1906 after a long and arduous journey. They faced a challenging environment, characterized by a harsh climate, different languages, and established traditional beliefs. To build a mission that would be accepted by the local community, they wisely chose to use the most readily available and culturally familiar materials: earth, wood, and grass.

The initial chapel, a humble structure, was completed in 1906. As the Catholic community grew through their missionary work, the need for a larger church became apparent. The cathedral, as it stands today, was substantially expanded in 1920 under the guidance of Father Ferdinand Gérard, who oversaw a collaborative effort between the missionaries and the local Kassena people. This collaborative construction process was instrumental in fostering a sense of local ownership and pride in the building.
