= Gabriel Justice Yaw Anokye =

Ghanaian Catholic bishop Kumasi (born 1960)

- Archbishop of Kumasi
- Church: Catholic Church
- Archdiocese: Archdiocese of Kumasi
- Appointed: 15 May 2012
- Predecessor: Thomas Kwaku Mensah
- Previous posts: Bishop of Obuasi (2008-2012); Titular Bishop of Cellae in Mauretania (2003-2008); Auxiliary Bishop of Kumasi (2003-2008)

Orders
- Ordination: 16 July 1988 by Peter Kwasi Sarpong
- Consecration: 17 January 2004 by Peter Kwasi Sarpong

Personal details
- Born: 27 May 1960 (age 66) Kumasi, Ashanti Region, Dominion of Ghana

Gabriel Justice Yaw Anokye (born 27 May 1960) is a Ghanaian bishop. He is the current Archbishop of Kumasi.

== Personal life ==
Anokye was consecrated and ordained by the Archbishop of Kumasi, Peter Kwasi Sarpong on 16 July 1989.

== Career ==
On 30 October 2003, Pope John Paul II appointed him Titular Bishop of Cellae in Mauritania and Auxiliary Bishop of Kumasi. He was ordained and promoted to Bishop by the Archbishop of Kumasi Perter Kwasi Sarpong on 17 January 2004. Priests in attendance included George Kocherry, Apostolic Nuncio for Ghana and Gregory E. Kpiebaya, Archbishop for Tamale.

Anokye was appointed Bishop of Obuasi by Pope Benedict XVI on 26 January 2008 and Archbishop of Kumasi on 15 October 2012.

From 2015 until 2023, he was the President of the pan-African Catholic organisation Caritas Africa.
