= Diocese of Navrongo–Bolgatanga =

Roman Catholic diocese in Ghana

Coordinates: 10.8841°N 1.0781°W

Location
- Country: Ghana
- Metropolitan: Tamale

Statistics
- Area: 16,602 km^{2} (6,410 sq mi)
- Population: Total; Catholics: (as of 2004); 1,500,000; 200,000 (13.3%)

Information
- Rite: Latin Rite

Current leadership
- Pope: Leo XIV
- Bishop: Alfred Agyenta

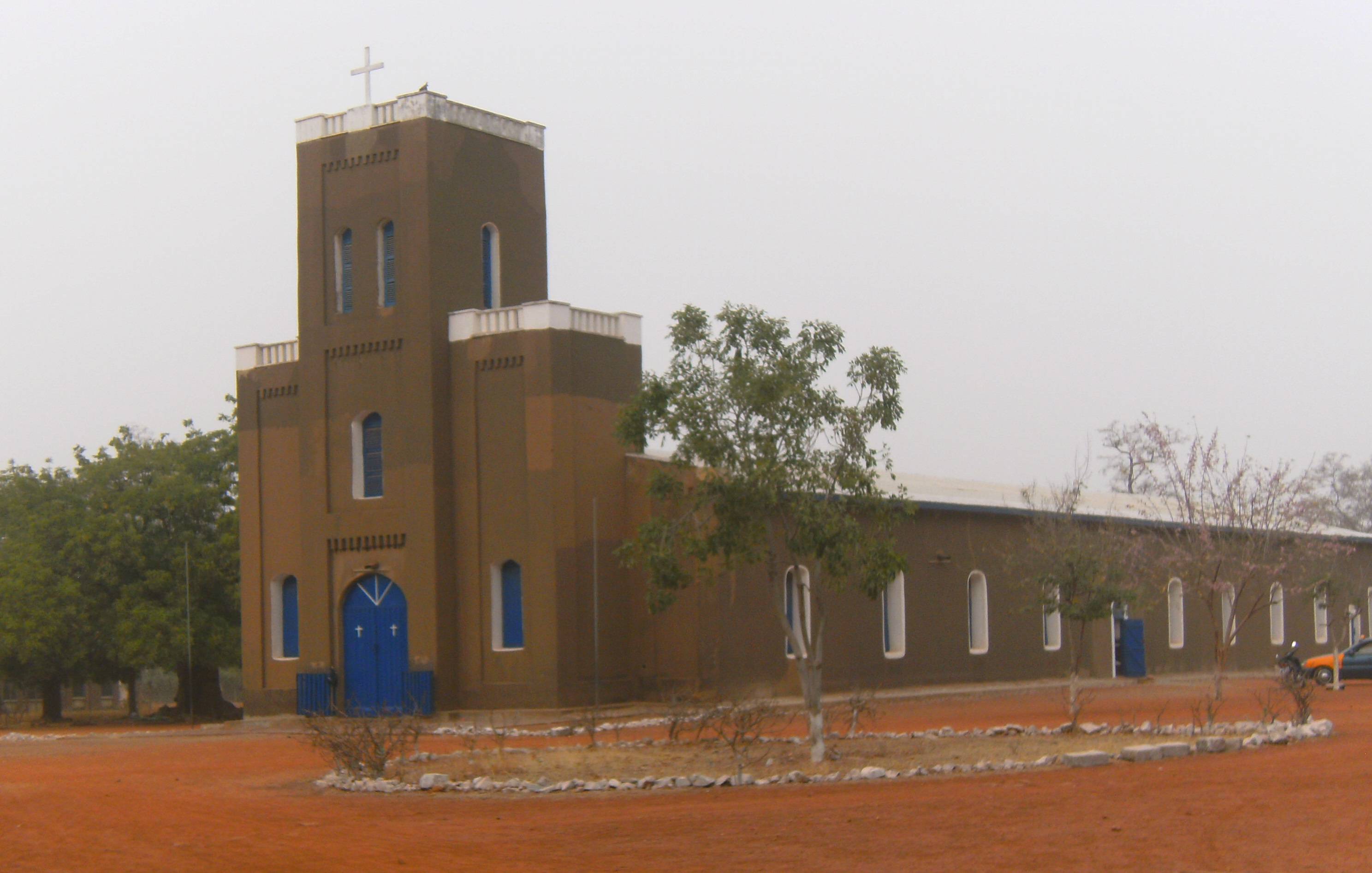
Our lady of seven sorrows minor basilica, Navrongo.

The Roman Catholic Diocese of Navrongo–Bolgatanga (Latin: Dioecesis Navrongensis-Bolgatangana) is a diocese located in the cities of Navrongo and Bolgatanga in the ecclesiastical province of Tamale in Ghana.

== History ==
Apostolic Prefecture of Navrongo and Apostolic Vicariate of Navrongo were predecessors of Roman Catholic Archdiocese of Tamale.

- April 23, 1956: Name restored as Diocese of Navrongo from the Diocese of Keta and the Diocese of Tamale
- May 30, 1977: Renamed as Diocese of Navrongo–Bolgatanga

== Special churches ==
Sacred Heart Cathedral and Our Lady of Seven Sorrows Minor Basilica.

== Bishops ==
- Bishop of rongo (Roman rite)
  - Bishop Gerard Bertrand, M. Afr. (April 12, 1957 – April 13, 1973)
- Bishops of Navrongo–Bolgatanga (Roman rite)
  - Bishop Rudolph A. Akanlu (April 13, 1973 – March 14, 1994)
  - Bishop Lucas Abadamloora (March 14, 1994 – December 23, 2009)
  - Bishop Alfred Agyenta (April 5, 2011 – ?)

=== Coadjutor Bishop ===
- Rudolph A. Akanlu (1972–73)

== See also ==
- Roman Catholicism in Ghana

== Sources ==
- GCatholic.org
- Catholic Hierarchy
