= Diocese of Sunyani =

Roman Catholic diocese in Ghana

Coordinates: 7.5837°N 1.9358°W

Diocese of Sunyani Dioecesis Sunyaniensis

Location
- Country: Ghana
- Metropolitan: Kumasi

Statistics
- Area: 6,408 km^{2} (2,474 sq mi)
- Population: Total; Catholics: (as of 2004); 1,995,893; 177,381 (8.9%)

Information
- Rite: Latin Rite

Current leadership
- Pope: Leo XIV
- Bishop: Matthew Kwasi Gyamfi

The Roman Catholic Diocese of Sunyani (Latin: Sunyanien(sis)) is a diocese located in the city of Sunyani in the ecclesiastical province of Kumasi in Ghana. The cathedral parish for the diocese is the Christ the King Cathedral.

== History ==
The establishment of the Diocese of Sunyani from Diocese of Kumasi was officially announced on 30 March 1973. This new diocese encompassed the entire Brong-Ahafo Region, and the late Msgr. James Kwadwo Owusu from Burma Camp was designated as its inaugural Bishop.

At that time, there existed merely nine parishes within the diocese. Bishop Owusu began his tenure with the support of only two Diocesan priests: Msgr. Robert Mensah-Abrampah, who was appointed as the Vicar General, and the Very Rev. Stephen Danso (now associated with the Goaso Diocese). Guided by his motto "in love and service for God and humanity," he established a strong spiritual and material groundwork for the diocese. Among the initial priests ordained by the new Bishop were Fathers Nimo, Gyansa-Tabi, and Msgr. Joseph Marfo Gyimah.

With the participation of the laity and the limited number of Diocesan priests, St. James Seminary was brought into existence in 1978. During a trip to Europe and America, the Bishop appealed for support and assistance: "Come and help us in Sunyani" the missionary institutes of both men and women responded generously.

November 8, 1997 marked the separation of the Goaso Diocese from the Sunyani Diocese and Msgr. Peter Atuahene was appointed as its inaugural Bishop.

On December 28, 2001, when the Most Rev. Bishop James K. Owusu died in a car accident. The following day, December 29, 2001, the College of Consultors came to a unanimous decision, electing the Very Rev. Fr. Seth Osei Agyemang, who was then serving as the Vicar General, to take on the role of Diocesan Administrator. Very Rev. Fr. Seth Agyemang efficiently fulfilled his responsibilities in overseeing the Diocese of Sunyani until 2003. Bishop, Most Rev. Matthew Kwasi Gyamfi, was also installed as the Second Bishop of Sunyani.

On December 28, 2007, the Techiman Diocese was established as separate from the Sunyani Diocese. Msgr. Dominic Yeboah Nyarko was chosen as its inaugural Bishop.

== Structure ==
=== Deaneries ===
The Diocese of Sunyani comprises seven deaneries, initially referred to as vicariates or districts according to the 1983 Code of Canon Law, deaneries are there "to foster pastoral care through common action". Led by a dean, each deanery is tasked with promoting and coordinating the unification of presbyters or priests within their vicariate for shared pastoral endeavors. The dean's primary role involves overseeing and facilitating this collaborative effort. The Sunyani Diocese consists of the following seven deaneries:

- Sunyani Deanery
- Odumase Deanery
- Berekum Deanery
- Dormaa Ahenkro Deanery
- Kwasibourkrom Deanery
- Sampa Deanery
- Wenchi Deanery

== Special churches ==
The Cathedral is Christ the King Cathedral in Sunyani.

== Bishops ==
- Bishop James Kwadwo Owusu (1973.03.01 – 2001.12.28)
- Bishop Matthew Kwasi Gyamfi (2003.04.14 - date)

=== Other priests of this diocese who became bishops ===
- Peter Kwaku Atuahene, was appointed Bishop of Goaso in 1997
- Dominic Nyarko Yeboah, was appointed Bishop of Techiman in 2007

== See also ==
- Roman Catholicism in Ghana
- List of Roman Catholic dioceses in Ghana
- GCatholic.org
- Catholic Hierarchy
