= KABA (radio personality) =

Ghanaian radio presenter (born 1980)

- Born: Kwadwo Asare Baffuor Acheampong; 15 January 1980
- Died: 17 November 2017 (aged 37); Korle Bu
- Years active: 1999–2017
- Presenting career
- Show: Ekosi Sen
- Station: Asempa Fm
- Time slot: 10am - 3pm
- Country: Ghana

Kwadwo Asare Baffuor Acheampong known professionally as KABA, was a Ghanaian radio presenter on the Multimedia Group Limited. He was also a television host on Adom TV.
