= Archdiocese of Cape Coast =

Roman Catholic archdiocese in Ghana

Coordinates: 5.1065°N 1.2446°W

Archdiocese of Cape Coast Archidioecesis A Litore Aureo
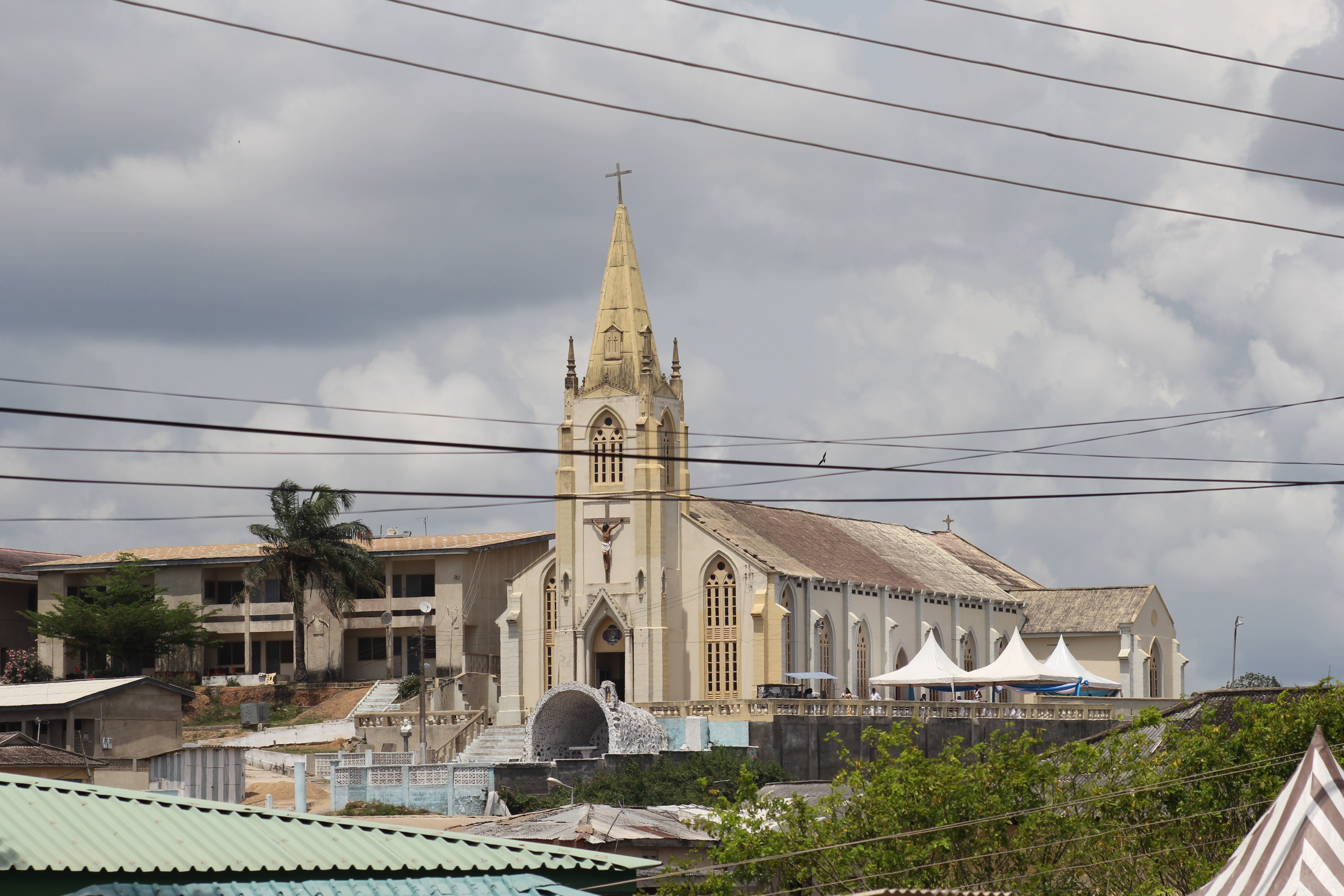
- St Francis de Sales Cathedral in Cape Coast

Location
- Country: Ghana
- Headquarters: Cape Coast, Ghana

Statistics
- Area: 9,788 km^{2} (3,779 sq mi)
- Population: Total; Catholics: (as of 2023); 2,942,755; 396,292 (13.5%)

Information
- Denomination: Catholic Church
- Sui iuris church: Latin Church
- Rite: Roman Rite
- Established: 27 September 1879; 146 years ago
- Cathedral: St. Francis de Sales Cathedral in Cape Coast
- Secular priests: 170
- Metropolitan Archbishop: Charles G. Palmer-Buckle
- Bishops emeritus: Matthias Kobena Nketsiah

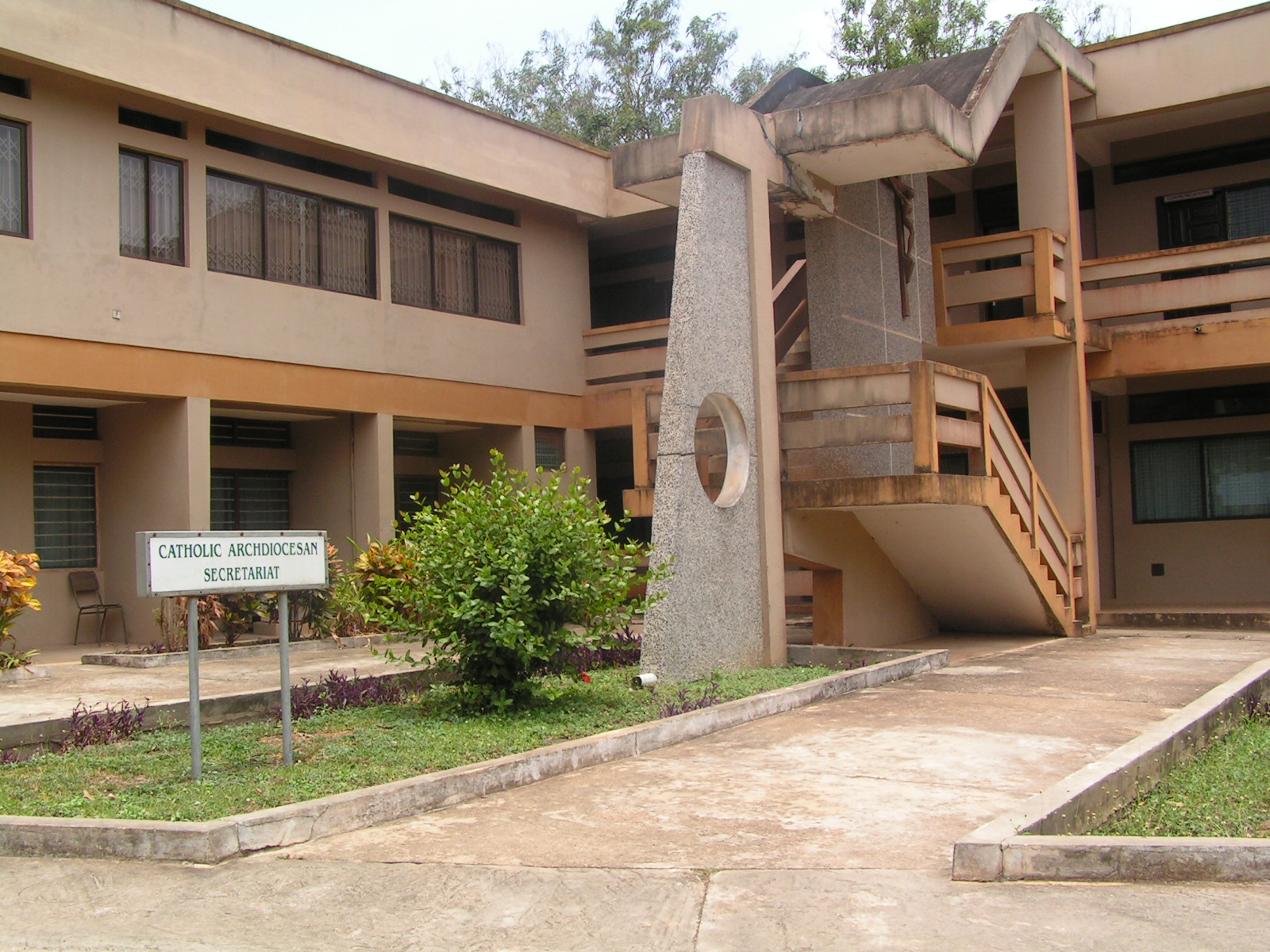
The archbishop's office

The Catholic Archdiocese of Cape Coast (Latin: a Litore Aureo) is the metropolitan see for the ecclesiastical province of Cape Coast in Ghana.

== History ==
- 27 September 1879: Established as Apostolic Prefecture of Gold Coast from the Apostolic Vicariate of Two Guineas in Gabon
- 25 May 1901: Promoted as Apostolic Vicariate of Gold Coast
- 18 April 1950: Promoted as Metropolitan Archdiocese of Cape Coast

The archdiocese has been generous in supplying priests for underserved areas of the United States; for example, in the Roman Catholic Diocese of Victoria in Texas, 16 of the 64 priests are from Ghana. Many have been incardinated into the archdiocese, have become U.S. citizens, and serve as parish pastors.

== Special churches ==
The seat of the archbishop is St. Francis de Sales Cathedral in Cape Coast.

== Bishops ==
Vicars apostolic of Gold Coast

- Maximilien Albert, S.M.A. (1895-1903)
- Isidore Klaus, S.M.A. (1904-1905)
- François-Ignace Hummel, S.M.A. (1906-1924)
- Ernest Hauger, S.M.A. (1925-1932)

Archbishops of Cape Coast

- William Porter, S.M.A. (1933-1959)
- John Kodwo Amissah (1959-1991)
- Peter Turkson (1992-2009)
- Matthias Kobena Nketsiah (2010-2018)
- Charles G. Palmer-Buckle (2018- )

Auxiliary bishops

- John Kodwo Amissah (1957-1959), appointed Archbishop here
- Matthias Kobena Nketsiah (2006-2010), appointed Archbishop here

Other priest of this diocese who became bishop

- Joseph Amihere Essuah, appointed Bishop of Kumasi in 1962

== Suffragan dioceses ==
- Sekondi–Takoradi
- Wiawso

== See also ==
- Catholicism in Ghana
