= Peter Turkson =

Ghanaian Roman Catholic Cardinal (born 1948)

His Eminence Peter Turkson
- Chancellor of the Pontifical Academy of Sciences; and the Pontifical Academy of Social Sciences
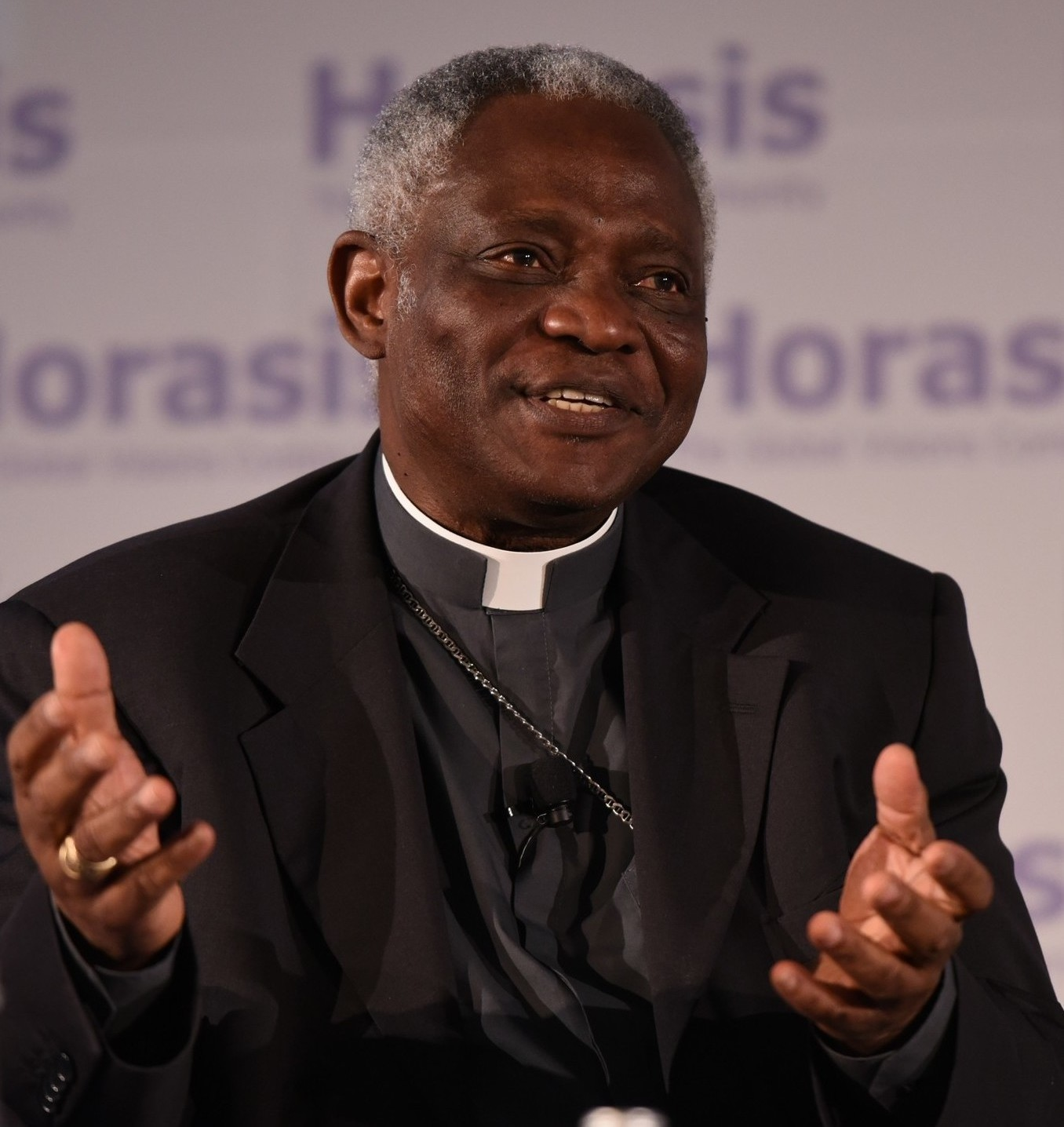
- Turkson in 2017
- Church: Catholic Church
- Appointed: 4 April 2022
- Predecessor: Marcelo Sánchez Sorondo
- Other post: Cardinal Priest of San Liborio (2003–)
- Previous posts: Archbishop of Cape Coast (1992–2009); President of the Pontifical Council for Justice and Peace (2009–2017); Prefect of the Dicastery for Promoting Integral Human Development (2017–2021)

Orders
- Ordination: 20 July 1975 by John Kodwo Amissah
- Consecration: 27 March 1993 by Dominic Kodwo Andoh
- Created cardinal: 21 October 2003 by Pope John Paul II
- Rank: Cardinal Priest

Personal details
- Born: Peter Kodwo Appiah Turkson; 11 October 1948 (age 78) Wassaw Nsuta, Gold Coast
- Denomination: Catholic (Latin Church)
- Education: St. Teresa's Seminary, Amisano; St. Peter's Regional Seminary, Pedu; St. Anthony-on-Hudson Seminary (MA, MDiv); Pontifical Biblical Institute (STL)
- Motto: Vivere Christus est (To live is Christ)
- Coat of arms

Styles of Peter Kodwo Appiah Turkson
- Reference style: His Eminence
- Spoken style: Your Eminence
- Informal style: Cardinal

Peter Kodwo Appiah Turkson (born 11 October 1948) is a Ghanaian Catholic prelate who has been a cardinal since 2003 and has served as chancellor of the Pontifical Academies of Sciences since 2022.

He was president of the Pontifical Council for Justice and Peace from 2009 to 2017 and the inaugural prefect of the Dicastery for the Promotion of Integral Human Development from 2017 to 2021. Turkson was previously Archbishop of Cape Coast from 1992 to 2009, and was made a cardinal by Pope John Paul II in 2003. He has been viewed as papabile, a likely candidate for election to the papacy, both during the 2013 papal conclave which elected Pope Francis, as well as the 2025 papal conclave, which elected Pope Leo XIV.

== Early life and priesthood ==
Turkson is an ethnic Fante and was born in Wassa Nsuta in Western Ghana to a Methodist Protestant mother and a Roman Catholic father. He is the fourth child of ten children. His mother sold vegetables in the open market while his father worked as a carpenter. He had a paternal uncle who was a Muslim. He studied at St. Teresa's Minor Seminary in Amisano and St. Peter's Regional Seminary in Pedu, Cape Coast, before attending St. Anthony-on-Hudson Seminary in Rensselaer, New York, where he graduated with an M.A. in Theology and a Master of Divinity. He was ordained to the priesthood by Archbishop John Amissah on 20 July 1975. Additionally, he earned a licentiate in Sacred Scripture from the Pontifical Biblical Institute in Rome in 1980. He returned to St Teresa's for a year, 1980–81, and became vice-rector at St Peter's Seminary in 1981. He also did pastoral work in a parish annexed to the seminary. From 1987 to 1992, he pursued doctoral studies in Sacred Scripture at the Pontifical Biblical Institute but his work on his thesis was interrupted by his appointment as archbishop of Cape Coast.

== Episcopal career ==
On 6 October 1992, Turkson was appointed Archbishop of Cape Coast by Pope John Paul II. He received his episcopal consecration on 27 March 1993 from Archbishop Dominic Kodwo Andoh, with Archbishops Peter Poreku Dery and Peter Kwasi Sarpong serving as co-consecrators. He served as President of the Ghana Catholic Bishops' Conference from 1997 to 2005, and as Chancellor of the Catholic University College of Ghana beginning in 2003.

John Paul II created Turkson Cardinal-Priest of San Liborio in his final consistory of 21 October 2003. Turkson is the first Ghanaian cardinal and was one of the cardinal electors who participated in the papal conclave of 2005 that elected Pope Benedict XVI, the papal conclave of 2013 that elected Pope Francis, and the papal conclave of 2025 that elected Pope Leo XIV.

== Roman Curia ==
On 24 October 2009, Pope Benedict XVI appointed Turkson president of the Pontifical Council for Justice and Peace. Turkson is also a member of the Congregation for the Evangelization of Peoples, the Congregation for Divine Worship and the Discipline of the Sacraments, the Pontifical Council for Promoting Christian Unity, the Pontifical Commission for the Cultural Heritage of the Church and, since 4 March 2010, the Pontifical Committee for International Eucharistic Congresses. On 12 June 2012, Turkson was appointed a member of the Congregation for Catholic Education.

On 16 October 2010, Pope Benedict named him to a five-year renewable term as a member of the Congregation for the Doctrine of the Faith. Since 2009, Turkson had been president of the Pontifical Council for Justice and Peace.

In the spring of 2011, Pope Benedict XVI sent Cardinal Turkson as a mediator to contribute to a diplomatic, non-military solution to the civil conflict in Ivory Coast, where Laurent Gbagbo had refused, in spite of international condemnation and local protests and resistance, to step aside and hand over power to Alassane Ouattara, the certified winner of the presidential election. Atrocities have been committed by both sides.

In October 2011, Turkson called for the establishment of a "global public authority" and a "central world bank" to rule over financial institutions that have become outdated and often ineffective in dealing fairly with crises. His text was very specific, calling for taxation measures on financial transactions. It said that "The economic and financial crisis which the world is going through calls everyone, individuals and peoples, to examine in depth the principles and the cultural and moral values at the basis of social coexistence". The document condemned "the idolatry of the market" as well as "neo-liberal thinking" that looked exclusively at technical solutions to economic problems. "In fact, the crisis has revealed behaviours like selfishness, collective greed and hoarding of goods on a great scale." It added that world economics needed an "ethic of solidarity" among both rich and poor nations.

On 13 October 2012, at a Vatican conference of bishops meant to address evangelizing lapsed Catholics, Turkson showed a YouTube video called "Muslim Demographics" that makes alarmist predictions about the growth of Islam in Europe, a video Reuters called "spurious". Vatican Radio described it as a "fear-mongering presentation". It resulted in "the most raucous back-and-forth most synod veterans have ever witnessed." On 15 October, he apologized and said he had only hoped to focus discussion on more practical issues.

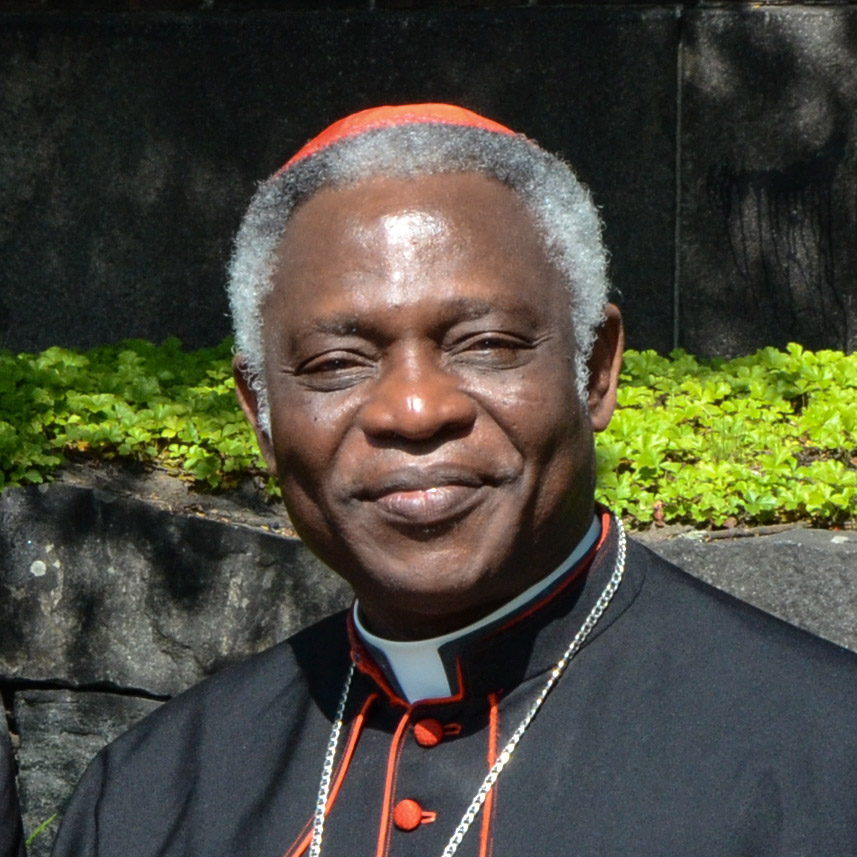
Cardinal Turkson pictured in Helsinki, Finland, in 2016

In 2016, Pope Francis sent Turkson as his special envoy to pursue peace in South Sudan: to urge an end to violence in the country, and to help establish dialogue and trust between the warring parties. Turkson traveled to Juba to support the archbishop and to meet with the country's leaders. He also carried with him a letter from Francis for President Salva Kiir and one for Vice President Riek Machar who are historic enemies and represent different ethnic groups.

On 31 August 2016, Pope Francis created the Dicastery for Promoting Integral Human Development, naming Turkson as its first prefect, effective 1 January 2017.

Ahead of the World Meeting of Families 2018 in Dublin, Turkson was announced as homilist at the opening ceremony at the Cathedral of the Assumption, Carlow.

On 23 December 2021, Pope Francis ended Turkson's service as prefect of the Dicastery for Promoting Integral Human Development at the conclusion of his five-year term, appointing Cardinal Michael Czerny as his temporary replacement.

On 4 April 2022, Pope Francis named him chancellor of the Pontifical Academy of Sciences and the Pontifical Academy of Social Sciences.

Turkson speaks English, Fante, French, Italian, German, and Hebrew, in addition to understanding Latin and Greek.

== Papabile status ==
Following the announcement on 11 February 2013 of the planned resignation of Pope Benedict XVI, Turkson was identified by the media as a possible candidate for the papacy. Bookmakers Paddy Power and Ladbrokes made Turkson the favourite to be elected pope, with Paddy Power giving 2/1 odds. Odds variously of 4/1, 11/4 against (by Paddy Power), and 5/4 against (by Ladbrokes) were given. Parties unknown placed fake election posters in Rome with the caption "At the conclave, vote Peter Kodwo Appiah Turkson!"

After the death of Pope Francis and with the 2025 papal conclave due to begin in May 2025, Turkson was again seen as papabile with The Guardian and BBC News listing him as a possible next pope, though he was omitted from CNN and CBS News' speculation stories.

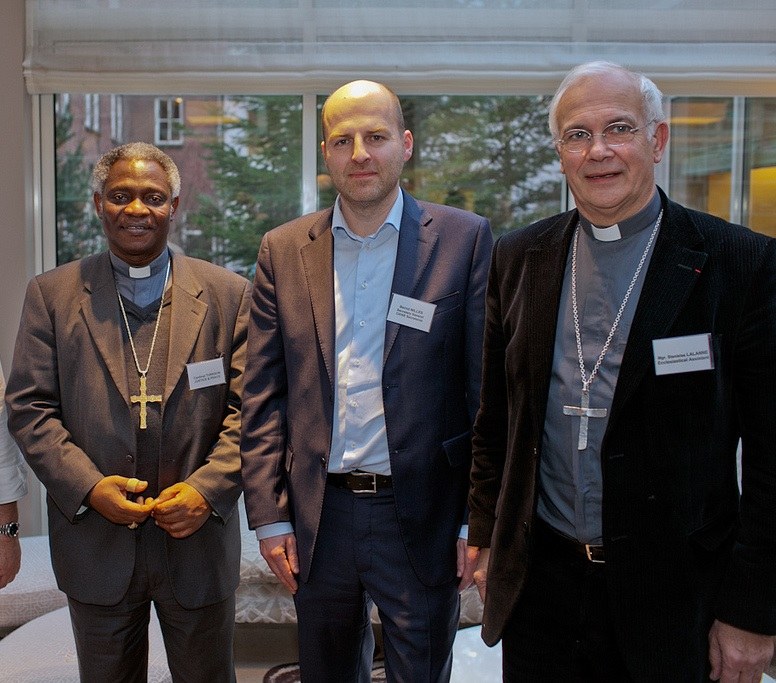
Cardinal Peter Turkson, the CIDSE Secretary General Bernd Nilles, and the French bishop Stanislas Lalanne

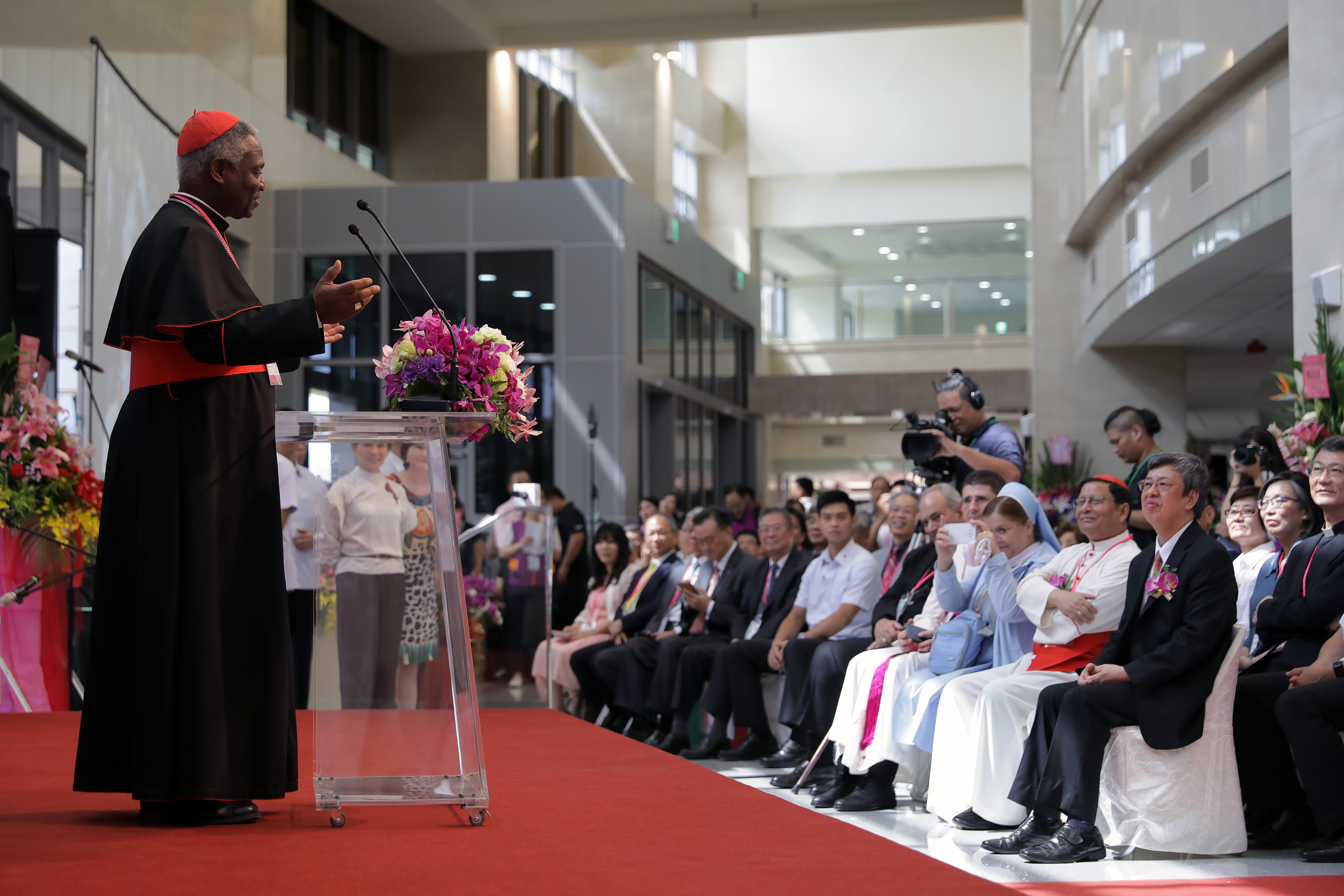
Cardinal Peter Turkson attended the opening ceremony of Fu Jen Catholic University Hospital in 2017

== Views ==
=== HIV/AIDS and condoms ===
In 2009, he reaffirmed the Catholic moral teaching on contraception, in regard to statements made by Pope Benedict XVI that condoms were not a solution to Africa's AIDS crisis that he and the Catholic Church claimed were taken out of context by the media, and instead attempted merely to emphasize fidelity and abstinence. Turkson claimed that the quality of condoms in Africa is poor, and thus that their use would also engender false confidence. The prevailing scientific consensus is that condom promotion does not lead to higher STI rates nor to increased frequency of sexual behavior, including in Africa. He said fidelity and, if infected, refraining from sex were the key to fighting the epidemic. He also said that the money being spent on condoms should instead be spent on providing anti-retroviral drugs to those already infected. He has affirmed that in certain circumstances natural family planning can be used.

=== Homosexuality ===
In 2012, in response to a speech by UN Secretary-General Ban Ki-moon urging Church leaders to do more for human rights and in particular LGBT rights in Africa, Turkson acknowledged that some of the sanctions imposed on homosexuals in Africa were an "exaggeration" but pointed out that the stigmatization of homosexuality in Africa is traditional and "just as there's a sense of a call for rights, there's also a call to respect culture, of all kinds of people." Turkson called on the Secretary-General to recognize the "subtle distinction between morality and human rights", and not disrespect moral doctrine in the name of protecting human rights.

Turkson has endorsed anti-sodomy laws, in particular the Ugandan legislation on sodomy, though has also condemned legislation criminalizing LGBTQ identities. Turkson believes that being homosexual is not a sin, but engaging in homosexual sex is.

=== Clerical sexual abuse ===
In February 2013, Turkson told an interviewer that he believes that the sexual abuse of children by Catholic priests, if found in Africa, would not likely be in the same proportion as it is found in Europe. He said that "African traditional systems ... have protected its population against this tendency" and that "in several cultures in Africa homosexuality or for that matter any affair between two sexes of the same kind are not countenanced".

=== Reform of the international financial system ===
In response to the 2008 financial crisis, Turkson, together with bishop Mario Toso, elaborated a proposal to reform the international financial system by creating a Global Public Authority and a Global Bank that consider the interests of all developing countries. The document of 40 pages was officially presented in October 2011 and criticises the current structure of the International Monetary Fund and other institutions.

=== Society ===
In a 2010 interview by L'Osservatore Romano, Turkson stated that "toxic values" such as "relativism" and "atheistic secularism" should be avoided. He also stated that bad political leadership and exploitation of differences between many Africans has led to a lack of peace and justice in Africa.

In August 2015, Turkson spoke at a pro-life conference of the Ghana Catholic Bishops Conference in Accra's Holy Spirit Cathedral. In 2017, he held that pro-life activism and the message on climate change "are not separable."

== See also ==
- Catholic Church in Ghana

Catholic Church titles
Preceded by John Kodwo Amissah	Archbishop of Cape Coast; 6 October 1992 – 24 October 2009	Succeeded by Matthias Kobena Nketsiah
Preceded by Johannes Joachim Degenhardt	Cardinal-Priest of San Liborio; 21 October 2003 – present	Incumbent
Preceded by Renato Raffaele Martino	President of the Pontifical Council for Justice and Peace; 24 October 2009 – 1 January 2017	Office abolished
New title	Prefect of the Dicastery for the Promotion of Integral Human Development; 1 January 2017 – 23 December 2021	Succeeded by Michael Czerny ad interim
