= Thomas Kwaku Mensah =

- Archbishop of Kumasi
- Church: Catholic Church
- Archdiocese: Archdiocese of Kumasi
- In office: 26 March 2008 – 15 May 2012
- Predecessor: Peter Kwasi Sarpong
- Successor: Gabriel Justice Yaw Anokye
- Previous post: Bishop of Obuasi (1995-2008)

Orders
- Ordination: 3 June 1973
- Consecration: 28 May 1995 by Jozef Tomko

Personal details
- Born: 2 February 1935 Asamang, Colony of the Gold Coast, British Empire
- Died: 10 April 2016 (aged 81)

Thomas Kwaku Mensah (2 February 1935 – 10 April 2016) was the Roman Catholic archbishop of the Archdiocese of Kumasi, Ghana.

Ordained to the priesthood on 3 June 1973. Mensah was consecrated Bishop of Obuasi on 28 May 1995, enthroned Archbishop on 26 March 2008 and retired on 15 May 2012.
