= John Kodwo Amissah =

Ghanaian prelate of the Catholic Church

- Archbishop of Cape Coast
- Church: Catholic Church
- Archdiocese: Archdiocese of Cape Coast
- In office: 19 December 1959 – 22 September 1991
- Predecessor: William Porter
- Successor: Peter Turkson
- Previous posts: Titular Bishop of Bencenna (1957-1959); Auxiliary Bishop of Cape Coast (1957-1959)

Orders
- Ordination: 11 December 1949
- Consecration: 16 June 1957 by William Porter

Personal details
- Born: 27 November 1922 Elmina, Colony of the Gold Coast, British Empire
- Died: 22 September 1991 (aged 68)

Styles of John Amissah
- Reference style: The Most Reverend
- Spoken style: Your Excellency
- Religious style: Monsignor
- Posthumous style: none

John Kodwo Amissah (27 November 1922 – 22 September 1991) was a Ghanaian prelate of the Catholic Church who served as Archbishop of Cape Coast from 1959 until his death.

Born in Elmina, he was ordained to the priesthood on 11 December 1949. His thesis at St. Peter's College in Rome was on a comparison between canon law and the native customs of marriage.

On 7 March 1957, Amissah was appointed Auxiliary Bishop of Cape Coast and Titular Bishop of Bencenna, receiving his episcopal consecration on the following 16 June from Archbishop William Thomas Porter, SMA. Amissah replaced Porter as Archbishop of Cape Coast on 19 December 1959.

During the late 1950s, he also studied the native and controversial custom of pouring libations on important occasions. Amissah explained that before Church leaders determine if this practice is good or bad, they must understand what villagers intend when they pour a libation.

He died at age 68 in a car accident heading to a parish visit, and is buried at the St. Francis de Sales Cathedral in Cape Coast, Ghana.

Catholic Church titles
| Preceded by William Thomas Porter, SMA | Archbishop of Cape Coast; 1959–1991 | Succeeded by Peter Turkson |
