= Diocese of Konongo–Mampong =

Roman Catholic diocese in Ghana

Coordinates: 7.0557°N 1.4016°W

Diocese of Konongo–Mampong Dioecesis Konongensis-Mamponganus

Location
- Country: Ghana
- Metropolitan: Kumasi

Statistics
- Area: 13,340 km^{2} (5,150 sq mi)
- Population: Total; Catholics: (as of 2004); 1,258,495; 95,487 (7.6%)

Information
- Rite: Latin Rite

Current leadership
- Pope: Leo XIV
- Bishop: John Opoku-Agyemang

The Roman Catholic Diocese of Konongo–Mampong (Latin: Konongen(sis)–Mampongan(us)) is a diocese located in the city of Konongo–Mampong in the ecclesiastical province of Kumasi in Ghana.

== History ==
The diocese of Konongo‑Mampong was created on 3 March 1995 by Pope John Paul II. It was carved out of two other dioceses, namely the diocese of Kumasi and the diocese of Sunyani. About 90% of the territory of the new diocese of Konongo- Mampong belonged to the diocese of Kumasi, which was created in 1950, having existed as a Vicariate for 18 years. The rest of the territory of the diocese belonged to the Sunyani diocese. Most Rev. Joseph Osei-Bonsu is the first Bishop of Konongo-Mampong. He was ordained bishop and installed on 28 May and 11 June 1995 respectively. Mampong is traditionally and historically second in importance to the Asante capital, Kumasi. Konongo is the oldest church in the diocese, its origins going back to 1917. It seems that it was for these reasons that Rome named the new diocese the "Konongo-Mampong Diocese". On 28 December 2007 the Diocese of Techiman was erected from the Sunyani and Konongo-Mampong Dioceses. The following parishes were taken from Konongo-Mampong and given to the new diocese of Techiman: Yeji, Atebubu, Kwame Danso and Prang. Governance The diocese has established or constituted certain councils, commissions and committees to assist the Bishop in governing the entire diocese.

The Cathedral is St. Paul Cathedral in Mampong-Ashanti. The Co-Cathedral is St. Gabriel's Co-Cathedral in Konongo, Ashanti-Akim.

== Deaneries ==
- Konongo Deanery: Rev. Fr. Daniel Fosu
- Jamasi Deanery: Rev. Fr. Raphael Osei Soadwah
- Ejusi Deanery: Rev. Fr. Gregory Amponsah-Nkansah
- Mamponteng Deanery: Rev. Fr. Savino Gyimah
- Mampong Deanery: Rev. Fr. Anthony Twum Barimah

== Leadership ==
Bishops of Konongo–Mampong (Roman rite)

- Joseph Osei-Bonsu (3 Mar 1995 Appointed - 21 Mar 2024)
- John Opoku-Agyemang (21 Mar 2024 - )

== See also ==
- Roman Catholicism in Ghana
