= Peter Kwasi Sarpong =

Ghanaian Catholic archbishop

- Archbishop Emeritus of Kumasi
- Church: Catholic Church
- Archdiocese: Archdiocese of Kumasi
- In office: 20 November 1969 – 26 March 2008
- Predecessor: Joseph Amihere Essuah
- Successor: Thomas Kwaku Mensah

Orders
- Ordination: 11 December 1959
- Consecration: 8 March 1970 by John Kodwo Amissah

Personal details
- Born: 6 March 1933 (age 93) Offinso, Ashanti Region, Colony of the Gold Coast, British Empire

Peter Kwasi Sarpong (born 6 February 1933) is the former Archbishop of the Archdiocese of Kumasi. He was born in Offinso, Ashanti.

He was ordained a priest on December 11, 1959, and incardinated into the clergy of the Diocese of Kumasi. Pope Paul VI appointed him Bishop of Kumasi on November 20, 1969. The Archbishop of Cape Coast, John Kodwo Amissah, consecrated him as bishop on March 8 of the following year. The co-consecrators were Joseph Amihene Essuah, Bishop of Sekondi-Takoradi, and Peter Poreku Dery, Bishop of Wa. Pope John Paul II elevated the diocese to an archdiocese on January 17, 2002, and thus he was appointed Archbishop of Kumasi. On March 26, 2008, Pope Benedict XVI accepted his resignation due to his age.

He has argued that the church in Africa is "not African enough".

== Publications (selection) ==
- The Sacred Stools of the Akans (Ghana Publishing Corporation, 1971).
- Ecumenical Relations in Ghana, Gambia, and Uganda (1973).
- Ghana in Retrospect (Ghana Publishing Corporation, 1974).
- Girls Nubility Rites (Ghana Publishing Corporation, 1977).
- Libation (Anansesem Publications Ltd, 1996).
- Ancestral Stool Veneration in Asante (St. Francis Press, 1996).
- Dear Nana: Letters to My Ancestor (Franciscan Publications, 1998).
- Cultural Perspectives on Ghana’s Development and Other Essays on Ghana at 50 (St Francis Press Ltd, 2011).
- Christian Reflection on Poverty.
- The One Honest Man (Sedco Press).
- Odd Customs: Stereotypes and Prejudices (Sub-Saharan Publishers, 2012).
- Archbishop Sarpong Explains Key Christian Topics (SNAM Ltd, 2016).
- Culture and the Kingdom (Good Shepherd Publications, 2016).
- articles in the Encyclopedia Africana.
