= Lucas Abadamloora =

Roman Catholic Bishop of Navrongo-Bolgatanga, Ghana

- Diocese: Roman Catholic Diocese of Navrongo-Bolgatanga
- Appointed: March 14, 1994

Orders
- Ordination: August 3, 1968
- Rank: Bishop

Personal details
- Born: December 22, 1938; Chiana, Upper East Region, Ghana
- Died: December 23, 2009 (aged 71); Bolgatanga, Ghana

Lucas Abadamloora (December 22, 1938 – December 23, 2009) was the Catholic Bishop of the Diocese of Navrongo-Bolgatanga, Ghana.

Abadamloora was born in Chiana near Navrongo, in the Upper East Region of Ghana. Ordained to the priesthood on August 3, 1968, Abadamloora was appointed bishop of the Navrongo-Bolgatango Diocese of March 14, 1994, and was ordained bishop on June 29, 1994.

== Early life and education ==
Born on December 22, 1938, in Chiana, a town near Navrongo within Ghana's Upper East Region, Abadamloora was the eldest among seven siblings. His parents, Charles and Joanna Abadamloora, were among the pioneer individuals to embrace the Catholic faith in Chiana.

In eight years, he started his educational journey at St. Paul's Primary Boarding School in Navrongo in 1948. He then proceeded to St. Mary's Middle School for a span of two years. His academic path from 1956 to 1962 led him to St. Charles Borromeo Minor Seminary in Tamale, followed by six years of study at the Government Secondary School. He pursued his education at St. Victor's Major Seminary in Tamale.

== Episcopal career ==
Abadamloora was ordained as a priest in 1968. On 14 March 1994, he was officially appointed by John Paul II and was enthroned the Bishop of the Navrongo-Bolgatanga Diocese on 29th of June 1994. At the time of his appointment, he had dedicated 41 years to the priesthood. His Patroness Saint was Our Lady of Seven Sorrows. He once served as the President of the Ghana Catholic Bishops' Conference.

== Published works ==
- Ghana in the Wake of the Revolution: An Urgent Need for Christian Social Principles (1982)
- Types of Mystical Experiences and Their Practical Aspects with Certain Allusions to the African Context (1986)

== See also ==
· · ·
