= Archdiocese of Kumasi =

Roman Catholic archdiocese in Ghana

Coordinates: 6°40′N 1°37′W

Archdiocese of Kumasi Archidioecesis Kumasiensis
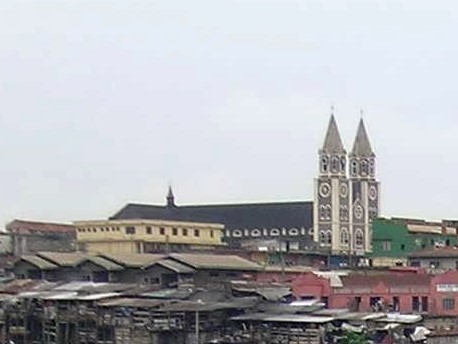
- St Peter’s Cathedral Basilica, Kumasi

Location
- Country: Ghana
- Headquarters: Kumasi, Ghana

Statistics
- Area: 1,865 km^{2} (720 sq mi)
- Population: Total; Catholics: (as of 2023); 2,339,500; 416,900 (17.8%)
- Parishes: 72

Information
- Denomination: Catholic Church
- Sui iuris church: Latin Church
- Rite: Roman Rite
- Established: 2 February 1932; 94 years ago
- Cathedral: St Peter's Cathedral Basilica, Kumasi
- Secular priests: 163
- Metropolitan Archbishop: Gabriel Justice Yaw Anokye
- Bishops emeritus: Peter Kwasi Sarpong

The Roman Catholic Archdiocese of Kumasi (Latin: Kumasien(sis)) is the metropolitan see for the ecclesiastical province of Kumasi in Ghana.

== History ==
- 1932.02.02: Established as Apostolic Vicariate of Kumasi from the Apostolic Vicariate of Gold Coast
- 1950.04.18: Promoted as Diocese of Kumasi
- 2002.01.17: Promoted as Metropolitan Archdiocese of Kumasi

== Special churches ==
The seat of the archbishop and minor basilica is St. Peter’s Cathedral Basilica in Kumasi.

== Bishops ==
- Vicar Apostolic of Kumasi (Roman rite)
  - Bishop Hubert Joseph Paulissen, S.M.A. (1932.11.29 – 1950.04.18); see below
- Bishops of Kumasi (Roman rite)
  - Bishop Hubert Joseph Paulissen, S.M.A. (1950.04.18 – 1952); see above
  - Bishop André van den Bronk, S.M.A. (1952.05.15 – 1962.02.13), appointed Prefect of Parakou, Benin
  - Bishop Joseph Amihere Essuah (1962.02.24 – 1969.11.20), appointed Bishop of Sekondi-Takoradi
  - Bishop Peter Kwasi Sarpong (1969.11.20 – 2002.01.17); see below
- Metropolitan Archbishops of Kumasi (Roman rite)
  - Archbishop Peter Kwasi Sarpong (2002.01.17 – 2008.03.26); see above
  - Archbishop Thomas Kwaku Mensah (2008.03.26 – 2012.05.15)
  - Archbishop Gabriel Justice Yaw Anokye (since 2012.05.15)

=== Auxiliary Bishop ===
- Gabriel Justice Yaw Anokye (2003-2008), appointed Bishop of Obuasi; later returned here as Archbishop

=== Other priest of this diocese who became bishop ===
- John Yaw Afoakwa, appointed Bishop of Obuasi in 2013

== Suffragan dioceses ==
- Goaso
- Konongo–Mampong
- Obuasi
- Sunyani
- Techiman

== See also ==
- Roman Catholicism in Ghana

== Sources ==
- GCatholic.org
- Website of Catholic Archdiocese Kumasi
