= Catholic Church in Ghana =

The Catholic Church in Ghana is part of the worldwide Catholic Church, under the spiritual leadership of the pope in Rome.

According to the 2021 census, approximately 14% of the population is Catholic. The country is divided into 20 dioceses including four archdioceses. These are listed here (with archdioceses written in bold text):

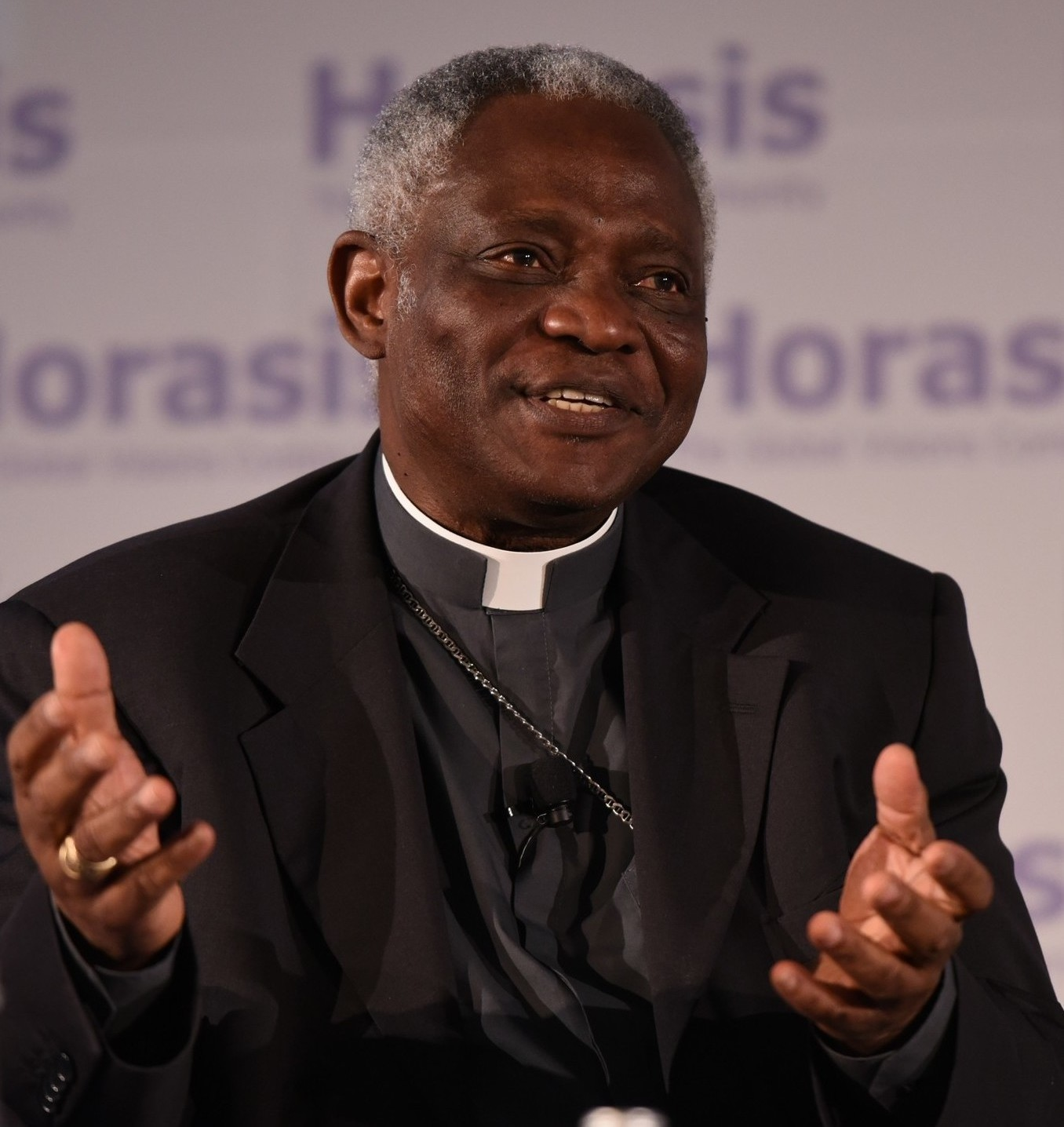
Peter Turkson, a Ghanaian cardinal of the Catholic Church

- **Accra**
  - Ho
  - Jasikan
  - Keta–Akatsi
  - Koforidua
  - Donkorkrom
- **Cape Coast**
  - Sekondi–Takoradi
  - Wiawso
- **Kumasi**
  - Goaso
  - Konongo–Mampong
  - Obuasi
  - Sunyani
  - Techiman
- **Tamale**
  - Damongo
  - Navrongo–Bolgatanga
  - Wa
  - Yendi

== Social services and development role ==
Catholic dioceses and religious orders in Ghana run an extensive network of primary and secondary schools, teacher training institutions, hospitals and clinics, and social development programmes. These institutions provide education and health services in both urban and rural areas and are frequently involved in poverty‑alleviation, community development, and emergency relief work. Such activities reflect a wider pattern in which religious organisations combine pastoral care with social service provision and development engagement.

== Public engagement, soft power, and peacebuilding ==
The Catholic Church in Ghana engages in public life through pastoral letters, social advocacy, interfaith dialogue, and participation in national debates over education, public health, and governance. Scholars of religion and international affairs argue that organized religions can exercise soft power and the Ghanaian Catholic Church’s public interventions can be read within that broader framework of religious influence on public affairs. Faith‑based approaches to peacebuilding and mediation have also been identified as areas where Catholic organisations contribute to conflict prevention and social reconciliation.

== Religion, identity, and social routines ==
Religious institutions help structure social routines, ritual life, and collective narratives that shape public identity. Conversely, religious routines and narratives, such as those from the Catholic Church, can mediate social anxieties and responses to political change.

== See also ==
- Religion in Ghana
- Christianity in Ghana
