= John Baptist Attakruh =

Ghanaian Catholic prelate (born 1948)

The Most Reverend John Baptist Attakruh
- Bishop of Sekondi-Takoradi, Ghana
- Church: Catholic Church
- Archdiocese: Roman Catholic Archdiocese of Cape Coast
- See: Roman Catholic Diocese of Sekondi-Takoradi
- Appointed: 24 June 2021
- Installed: 24 September 2021
- Predecessor: John Bonaventure Kwofie
- Successor: Incumbent
- Other post: Apostolic Administrator of Sekondi-Takoradi (31 July 2020 - 24 June 2021)

Orders
- Ordination: 30 July 1989 by Charles Kweku Sam
- Consecration: 24 September 2021 by Henryk Mieczysław Jagodziński
- Rank: Bishop

Personal details
- Born: John Baptist Attakruh; 13 October 1957 (age 68) Juabo, Archdiocese of Cape Coast, Western Region, Ghana

Styles of John Baptist Attakruh
- Reference style: Your Lordship; The Most Reverend
- Spoken style: His Lordship
- Religious style: Bishop

John Baptist Attakruh (born 13 October 1957) is a Ghanaian Catholic prelate who is the Bishop of the Roman Catholic Diocese of Sekondi-Takoradi in the Metropolitan Ecclesiastical Province of Cape Coast in Ghana. He was appointed bishop by Pope Francis on 24 June 2021. He was consecrated as bishop and installed at Takoradi, Ghana on 24 September 2021. While still a priest, he served as apostolic administrator of Sekondi-Takoradi from 31 July 2020 until 24 Jun 2021.

== Background and education ==
John Baptist Attakruh was born on 13 October 1957 in Juabo, Diocese of Sekondi-Takoradi, Western Region in Ghana. He studied in his home area for his elementary school education. He studied at Saint Teresa's Minor Seminary in Elmina from 1972 until 1979. "He carried out his formation as a novice in the Society of Jesus in Benin City from 1980 until 1982". He studied philosophy at the Institut Saint Pierre Canisius in Kinshasa from 1982 until 1985. He then studied theology at Saint Peter's Regional Seminary in Cape Coast from 1985 until 1989. He studied at the Pontifical Athenaeum of Saint Anselm in Rome, Italy from 1992 until 1995. He graduated from there with a Licentiate in liturgy. Later, he obtained a Master of Science degree in educational administration from St. John's University (New York City).

== Priest ==
He was ordained a priest of the Diocese of Sekondi-Takoradi on 30 July 1989 by Charles Kweku Sam, Bishop of Sekondi-Takoradi. He served as a priest until 24 June 2021. While a priest, he served in many roles and locations including:

- Deputy pastor of the Immaculate Conception Parish in Asankragwa from 1989 until 1991.
- Vice rector of Saint Mary's Minor Seminary from 1991 until 1992.
- Chaplain of Saint Mary's Boys Senior High School in Apowa from 1991 until 1992.
- Director of vocations of the diocese of Sekondi-Takoradi from 1991 until 1992.
- Director of Saint Kizito Pastoral and Catechetical Center in Apowa from 1996 until 1998.
- Director of the liturgical office from 1996 until 1998.
- Member of the College of Consultors from 1996 until 1998.
- Member of the Presbyteral Council from 1996 until 1998.
- Member of the Diocesan Pastoral Board from 1996 until 1998.
- Diocesan director of the Pontifical Mission Societies from 1996 until 1998.
- Member of the National Liturgical Commission from 1996 until 1998.
- Formator and lecturer at Saint Peter's Regional Seminary in Cape Coast from 1998 until 2004.
- Sabbatical in the United States and studies leading to a Master of Science in educational administration from Saint John's University (New York City) from 2004 until 2014.
- Chaplain of the Brookhaven Memorial Hospital Medical Center from 2004 until 2014.
- Guest priest at the Saint John the Baptist Church, diocese of Rockville Center during the same time period.
- Coordinator of the first diocesan Synod of Sekondi-Takoradi in 2015.
- Diocesan coordinator of the Year of Mercy in 2016.
- Member of the National Catechetical Commission from 2015 until 2020.
- Parish priest of the Saint Francis of Assisi Church, in Beahu from 2016 until 2017.
- Lecturer of liturgy at Saint Peter's Regional Seminary 2016 until 2021
- Parish priest of the Saint Ignatius Church at the Takoradi Air Force Base from 2017 until 2021.
- Apostolic Administrator of the diocese of Sekondi-Takoradi from 2020 until 2021.

== Bishop ==
On 24 June 2021, Pope Francis appointed Reverend Father John Baptist Attakruh, a member of the clergy of Sekondi-Takoradi Diocese, previously apostolic administrator of the same diocese as the new Local Ordinary of that Catholic See.

He was consecrated and installed at Takoradi on 24 September 2021. Principal Consecrator was Henryk Mieczysław Jagodziński, Titular Archbishop of Limosano assisted by Philip Naameh, Archbishop of Tamale and John Bonaventure Kwofie, Archbishop of Accra.

== See also ==
- Catholic Church in Ghana

== Succession table ==
Catholic Church titles
Preceded by John Bonaventure Kwofie (3 July 2014 - 2 January 2019)	Bishop of Sekondi-Takoradi (since 24 June 2021)	Succeeded by Incumbent
