= Simon Kofi Appiah =

Roman Catholic bishop in Ghana

His Excellency The Most Reverend Simon Kofi Appiah
- Bishop of Jasikan
- Church: Catholic Church
- Diocese: Diocese of Jasikan
- Appointed: 23 December 2025
- Predecessor: Gabriel Akwasi Abiabo Mante

Orders
- Ordination: 21 July 1990
- Consecration: 11 April 2026 by Julien Kaboré

Personal details
- Born: 21 July 1964 (age 61) Teteman, Volta Region, Ghana
- Education: St. Peter's Regional Seminary; Universität Tübingen; University of London; Catholic University of Eastern Africa

Simon Kofi Appiah (born July 21, 1964) is a Ghanaian-born Catholic bishop and academic who was appointed bishop for the Diocese of Jasikan in 2025.

== Early life and education ==
Appiah was born on July 21, 1964, in Teteman, Ghana.

He completed philosophy and theology studies in preparation for the priesthood at St. Peter's Regional Seminary. He then completed a doctorate in theological ethics at University of Tübingen, a postgraduate diploma in psychology University of London, and another diploma in teaching higher education from the Catholic University of Eastern Africa in Kenya.

== Ecclesiastical career ==
=== Priesthood ===
Appiah was ordained a priest for the former Diocese of Keta-Ho. Coinciding with the Diocese of Jasikan's 1994 erection from territory of Keta-Ho, Appiah was incardinated in Jasikan.

He served as a parochial vicar from 1990 to 1995. While involved in the formation of seminarians, Appiah delivered a 2007 lecture emphasizing the moral formation of priests. He argued that priests must be formed in family values and personal integrity since they hold public offices in their communities.

Appiah is involved in promoting the lay apostolate. Appiah co-authored the 2017 Laity Week Study Programme, a series for lay catechesis at both the Diocesan and parish levels throughout Ghana. He said that the laity must learn Church doctrine and teaching on social issues. Speaking to over 400 participants at an event in the Archdiocese of Accra, Appiah encouraged lay Catholics to creatively use their resources and time in local communities, especially in pastoral care. He highlighted the fact that laity have better access to the poor, weak, and sick in a community than a priest usually does.

=== Episcopacy ===
On December 23, 2025, Pope Leo XIV appointed Appiah the second bishop of Diocese of Jasikan, succeeding Bishop Gabriel Akwasi Abiabo Mante. One Ghanaian media outlet noted Appiah's "extensive academic and pastoral experience."

== Academic career ==
As of 2011, Appiah has been a lecturer at the University of Cape Coast in its Department of Religion and Human Values. He also lectured at the major seminary in Pedu.

Appiah has written about the forms and role of Christian inculturation. This was not from just a missiological perspective but as “the process by which religion assumes cultural embodiment.” Herbert Moyo cited Appiah's perspective in favor of Christian missionaries's familiarization with African Traditional Religions and their practice Appiah has also written about moral “essentialists” and “existentialists” which respectively push fundamentalist or liberal religion. He highlights this difference in order to find a middle ground and encourage an reflective inculturation in Africa. In 2021, Appiah spoke on a panel at the University of Marburg discussing religious fetish objects.

=== Selected bibliography ===
- Appiah, Simon Kofi (2003). "The Quest of African Identity". Exchange. 32 (1): 54–65. doi:10.1163/157254303X00136. ISSN 0166-2740.
- Appiah, Simon Kofi (2012). "The Challenge of a Theologically Fruitful Method for Studying African Christian Ethics: The Role of the Human Sciences". Exchange. 41 (3): 254–278. doi:10.1163/157254312X617132. ISSN 0166-2740.
- Appiah, Simon Kofi; Kodah, Mawuloe (2020-05-06). "I think therefore I am: Linking human exploitation to religious irrationality in Kourouma's Allah Is Not obliged". Religious Studies and Theology. 39 (1): 91–105. doi:10.1558/rsth.40475. ISSN 1747-5414.
- Awuah-Nyamekye, Samuel; Appiah, Simon Kofi (2022), "Colonial Marginalities and Post-Colonial Fragments: Inter-Faith Networking for Development in Ghana", in Chitando, Ezra; Gusha, Ishanesu Sextus (eds.), Interfaith Networks and Development, Cham: Springer International Publishing, pp. 231–251, doi:10.1007/978-3-030-89807-6_13, ISBN 978-3-030-89806-9
- Appiah, Simon Kofi (2022-12-22). "Thinking Africa in Postmission Theology: Implications for Global Theological Discourse". Exchange. 51 (4): 343–360. doi:10.1163/1572543x-bja10007. ISSN 0166-2740.
