= Gabriel Edoe Kumordji =

Ghanaian Catholic prelate (born 1956)

The Most Reverend Gabriel Edoe Kumordji
- Bishop of Keta-Akatsi, Ghana
- Church: Catholic Church
- Archdiocese: Roman Catholic Archdiocese of Accra
- See: Roman Catholic Diocese of Keta-Akatsi
- Appointed: 16 March 2017
- Installed: 13 May 2017
- Predecessor: Anthony Kwami Adanuty
- Successor: Incumbent

Orders
- Ordination: 14 July 1985 by Dominic Kodwo Andoh
- Consecration: 17 April 2010 by Léon Kalenga Badikebele
- Rank: Bishop

Personal details
- Born: Gabriel Edoe Kumordji; 24 March 1956 (age 70) Accra, Archdiocese of Accra, Ghana
- Motto: “Adveniat Regnum Tuum” (Thy Kingdom Come)

Styles of Gabriel Edoe Kumordji
- Reference style: Your Lordship; The Most Reverend
- Spoken style: His Lordship
- Religious style: Bishop

Gabriel Edoe Kumordji S.V.D. (born 24 March 1956) is a Ghanaian Catholic prelate who is the bishop of the Roman Catholic Diocese of Keta-Akatsi in Ghana since 16 March 2017. Before that, from 19 January 2010 until 16 March 2017, he was Apostolic Vicar of the Catholic Vicariate Apostolic of Donkorkrom in Ghana. He was consecrated bishop on 17 April 2010. He was appointed Titular Bishop of Ita and served as such, concurrently while apostolic vicar of Donkorkrom. The Holy Father transferred him to the diocese of Keta-Akatsi and appointed him as the local ordinary there on 16 March 2017. He was installed there on 13 May 2017. He is a member of the Society of the Divine Word.

== Background and education ==
He was born on 24 March 1956 in Accra, Archdiocese of Accra, Ghana. He attended Amamomo Primary School and Sacred Heart Parish Primary School in Korle-Worko, Accra. He studied at Mamprobi Sempe 7 Middle School at Mamprobi in Accra, for his middle school education. He studied at Saint Thomas Aquinas Secondary School in Accra for his secondary school education. In 1976, he entered Saint Victor's Major Seminary in Tamale. While there, he became a member of the Society of the Divine Word. He holds a Master's degree in pastoral studies from Loyola University in Chicago, Illinois, United States, where he studied from 1991 until 1993. He also holds a Post Graduate Certificate in Religious Formation from St. Louis University in Missouri. From 2001 to 2005, he studied at Fuller Theological Seminary at Pasadena, California, United States, graduating with a Master's degree and a Doctorate in Inter-Cultural Studies.

== Priest ==
He professed to be a member of the Society of the Divine Word on 8 December 1980. On 14 July 1985, he was ordained a priest of that religious Order by Dominic Kodwo Andoh, Bishop of Accra. He served as priest until 19 January 2010.

As a priest, he served in various roles and locations including:

- Assistant Priest at St Augustine Parish, Asesewa in the Eastern Region from 1985 until 1989.
- Pastor of St Maria Goretti Parish at Battor from 1989 until 1991.
- Studies at Loyola University leading to an MA in pastoral studies from 1991 to 1993.
- Studies at St. Louis University in Missouri leading to a postgraduate certificate in religious formation from 1991 until 1993.
- Prefect of SVD Seminarians and lecturer in Pastoral Theology, Homiletic, Pastoral Counseling, and Missiology at St. Victor's Major Seminary in Tamale from 1993 until 2001.
- Studies at Fuller Theological Seminary in Pasadena, California from 2001 until 2005, where he obtained an MA and PhD in Inter-Cultural Studies.
- Ghana Provincial Superior of the Divine Word Missionaries (SVD) since 22 June 2005.
- President of Conference of Major Superiors of Religious Men in Ghana since 2006.
- Apostolic Prefect of Apostolic Prefecture of Donkorkrom from 12 June 2007 until 19 January 2010.

On 12 June 2007 Pope Benedict XVI created the Apostolic Prefecture of Donkorkrom in Ghana, with territory taken from the Roman Catholic Diocese of Koforidua. The Holy Father appointed Reverend Father Gabriel Edoe Kumordji, S.V.D., Superior Provincial of the Divine Word Missionaries in Ghana as the pioneer Apostolic Prefect of Donkorkrom.

== Bishop ==
On 19 January 2010, the Holy See elevated the Apostolic Prefecture of Donkorkrom in Ghana, to the Apostolic Vicariate of Donkorkrom. Father Gabriel Edoe Kumordji, the Apostolic Prefect was elevated to Apostolic Vicar and Titular Bishop of Ita. He was consecrated as bishop on 17 April 2010 by Léon Kalenga Badikebele, Titular Archbishop of Magnetum assisted by Gabriel Charles Palmer-Buckle, Archbishop of Accra and Vincent Sowah Boi-Nai, Bishop of Yendi.

On 16 March 2017, Pope Francis transferred him to the Diocese of Keta-Akatsi, to succeed Anthony Kwami Adanuty, the founding bishop of the diocese, whose age-related Canonical resignation was accepted by the Holy Father that same day. He was installed at Akatsi on 13 May 2017. As of 2024, he is still the local ordinary there.

== See also ==
- Catholic Church in Ghana

== Succession table ==
Preceded by Vicariate created	Apostolic Vicar of Donkorkrom (19 January 2010 - 16 March 2017)	Succeeded by John Alphonse Asiedu (since 11 February 2019)
Preceded by Anthony Kwami Adanuty (19 December 1994 - 7 April 2016)	Bishop of Keta-Akatsi (since 16 March 2017)	Succeeded by Incumbent
