= Anyaa-Sowutuom =

Anyaa-Sowutuom may refer to:

- Anyaa-Sowutuom (Ghana parliamentary constituency)
- Sowutuom, also known as Anyaa-Sowutuom, town in Greater Accra Region, Ghana
