= Gabriel Akwasi Abiabo Mante =

Ghanaian Catholic prelate (born in 1947)

The Most Reverend Gabriel Akwasi Ababio Mante
- Bishop Emeritus of Jasikan, Ghana
- Church: Catholic Church
- Archdiocese: Roman Catholic Archdiocese of Accra
- See: Roman Catholic Diocese of Jasikan
- Appointed: 19 December 1994
- Installed: 28 May 1995
- Term ended: 23 December 2025
- Predecessor: Diocese created
- Successor: Simon Kofi Appiah (since 23 December 2025)

Orders
- Ordination: 2 July 1977
- Consecration: 28 May 1995 by Jozef Cardinal Tomko
- Rank: Bishop

Personal details
- Born: Gabriel Akwasi Ababio Mante; 27 July 1947 (age 79) Nkonya Ahenkro, Oti Region, Ghana

Styles of Gabriel Akwasi Ababio Mante
- Reference style: Your Lordship; The Most Reverend
- Spoken style: His Lordship
- Religious style: Bishop

Gabriel Akwasi Ababio Mante (born 27 July 1947) is a Ghanaian Catholic prelate who was the bishop of the Roman Catholic Diocese of Jasikan in Ghana, from 19 December 1994 until his retirement on 23 December 2025. Before that, from 2 July 1977 until he was appointed bishop, he was a Catholic priest of the Roman Catholic Diocese of Keta-Ho, in Ghana. He was appointed bishop by Pope John Paul II. He was consecrated and installed at Jasikan, on 28 May 1995. Pope Leo XIV accepted his retirement request on 23 December 2025.

== Background and priesthood ==
Gabriel Akwasi Ababio Mante was born on 25 July 1947 in Nkonya Ahenkro, Diocese of Keta-Ho, Oti Region in Ghana. He studied Philosophy and theology at seminary. He was ordained a priest of the Roman Catholic Diocese of Keta-Ho on 2 July 1977. He served as priest until 19 December 1994.

== Bishop ==
On 19 December 1994, Pope John Paul II created the Roman Catholic Diocese of Jasikan by splitting the erstwhile Diocese of Keta-Ho. The Holy Father appointed Reverend Father Gabriel Akwasi Ababio Mante as the pioneer bishop of the new diocese, a suffragan of the Metropolitan Ecclesiastical Province of Accra.

He was consecrated bishop and installed at Jasikan on 28 May 1995 by Jozef Cardinal Tomko, Cardinal-Deacon of Gesù Buon Pastore alla Montagnola assisted by Francis Anani Kofi Lodonu, Bishop of Ho and Gregory Eebolawola Kpiebaya, Archbishop of Tamale. He was still the local ordinary as of December 2024.

On 23 December 2025, Pope Leo XIV accepted the retirement request submitted by Bishop Gabriel Akwasi Abiabo Mante from the pastral care of the Diocese of Jasikan, Ghana. The same day, The Holy Father appointed Simon Kofi Appiah to succeed as the new local ordinary at Jasikan.

== See also ==
- Catholic Church in Ghana

== Succession table ==
Catholic Church titles
Preceded by (Diocese created)	Bishop of Jasikan (19 December 1994 - 23 December 2025)	Succeeded by Simon Kofi Appiah (since 23 December 2025)
