= Ablekuma =

Town in Ghana

- Town
- Coordinates: 5°31′12″N 00°28′48″W
- Country: Ghana
- Region: Greater Accra
- District: Ga Central

Ablekuma is a peri-urban town located in the Ga Central District of the Greater Accra Region of Ghana.

== Location ==
Ablekuma is located along the Awoshie-Pokuase highway. Its distance by road from the Accra International Airport is approximately 13.4 kilometres (8.3 mi). The coordinates of the town are 05°31'12"N, 00°28'48"W.

Ablekuma's estimated elevation above sea level is 45 meters.

== Politics ==
Ablekuma is in the Anyaa-Sowutuom constituency headed by Hon Dr. Dickson Adomako Kissi, a member of the New Patriotic Party. The traditional Chief of Ablekuma is Nii Larbi Mensah IV.

Ablekuma was noted for the murder of two policemen, Owusu Sekyere (alias Kweku Ninja) and Jerry Wornu (alias Taller). on November 24, 1998
