= Joseph Kwaku Afrifah-Agyekum =

Ghanaian Roman Catholic prelate (born 1954)

The Most Reverend Joseph Kwaku Afrifah-Agyekum
- Bishop of Koforidua, Ghana
- Church: Catholic Church
- Archdiocese: Roman Catholic Archdiocese of Accra
- See: Roman Catholic Diocese of Koforidua
- Appointed: 12 April 2006
- Installed: 1 July 2006
- Predecessor: Gabriel Charles Palmer-Buckle
- Successor: Incumbent

Orders
- Ordination: 17 July 1983 by Dominic Kodwo Andoh
- Consecration: 1 July 2006 by Gabriel Charles Palmer-Buckle
- Rank: Bishop

Personal details
- Born: Joseph Kwaku Afrifah-Agyekum; 22 December 1954 (age 71) Akim Swedru, Eastern Region, Archdiocese of Accra, Ghana

Styles of Joseph Kwaku Afrifah-Agyekum
- Reference style: Your Lordship; The Most Reverend
- Spoken style: His Lordship
- Religious style: Bishop

Joseph Kwaku Afrifah-Agyekum (born 22 Dember 1954) is a Ghanaian Catholic prelate who is the bishop of the Roman Catholic Diocese of Koforidua in the Metropolitan Ecclesiastical Province of Accra in Ghana. He previously served as a priest of the same catholic diocese from 6 July 1992. He was appointed bishop by Pope Benedict XVI on 12 April 2006. He was consecrated as bishop and installed at Koforidua, Ghana on 1 July 2006.

== Background and education ==
He was born on 22 December 1954 at Akim Swedru, Eastern Region, Archdiocese of Accra, in Ghana. He studied philosophy and theology at seminary. He was ordained a priest on 17 July 1983 by Dominic Kodwo Andoh, Bishop of Accra. He holds a Doctorate in sacred liturgy awarded by the Pontifical Atheneum of St. Anselm, in Rome, where he studied from 1986 until 1992.

== Priest ==
Joseph Kwaku Afrifah-Agyekum was ordained a priest of the Diocese of Accra on 17 July 1983. When the Diocese of Koforidua was created on 6 July 1992, he was incardinated in the new diocese. He served as priest until 12 April 2006.

As a priest, he served in various roles and locations including:

- Assistant priest at Accra Cathedral from 1983 until 1985.
- Parish priest at St. Peter's Parish in Osu from 1985 until 1986.
- Studies at the Pontifical Atheneum of St. Anselm, in Rome leading to a doctorate in liturgy from 1986 until 1992.
- Parish priest at St. George's parish, Koforidua from 1992 until 1993.
- Administrator of the cathedral at Koforidua from 1992 until 1993.
- Vicar general of Koforidua Diocese from 1992 until 1993.
- Diocesan administrator of Koforidua Diocese from 2005 until 2006.

== Bishop ==
On 12 April 2006, Pope Benedict XVI appointed him bishop of the Roman Catholic Diocese of Koforidua. He succeeded Gabriel Charles Palmer-Buckle who had been elevated to Archbishop of Accra the year before, on 30 March 2005. He was consecrated bishop by Gabriel Charles Palmer-Buckle, Archbishop of Accra assisted by Peter Kwasi Sarpong, Archbishop of Kumasi and Gregory Eebolawola Kpiebaya, Archbishop of Tamale. He encourages unity among the Catholics in his diocese.

At their 4th General Assembly held in Abuja, from the 2 May 2022 until 9 May 2022, the Regional Episcopal Conference of West Africa (RECOWA), elected The Most Reverend Joseph Afrifah-Agyekum, Bishop of Koforidua Diocese in Ghana as the Vice President of the organization. In May 2025 at the 5th General Assembly of RECOWA, the entire leadership was re-elected for another 3 years.

== See also ==
- Catholic Church in Ghana

== Succession table ==
Catholic Church titles
Preceded by Gabriel Charles Palmer-Buckle (6 July 1992 - 30 March 2005)	Bishop of Koforidua (since 12 April 2006)	Succeeded by Incumbent
