= John Alphonse Asiedu =

Ghanaian Roman Catholic prelate (born 1962)

Most Reverend John Alphonse Asiedu S.V.D.
- Bishop of Donkorkrom
- Church: Roman Catholic
- Province: Accra
- Diocese: Donkorkrom
- Appointed: 12 May 2026 (as Diocesan Bishop)
- Installed: 11 February 2019 (as Vicar Apostolic)
- Predecessor: Gabriel Edoe Kumordji
- Other post: Vicar Apostolic of Donkorkrom (2019–2026)

Orders
- Ordination: 19 July 1997 by Dominic Kodwo Andoh
- Consecration: 4 May 2019 by Philip Naameh

Personal details
- Born: John Alphonse Asiedu; 12 May 1962 (age 64) Adeemmra, Eastern Region, Ghana

John Alphonse Asiedu S.V.D. (born 12 May 1962) is a Ghanaian Roman Catholic prelate who has served as the first Bishop of the Diocese of Donkorkrom since May 2026. He was previously the Vicar Apostolic of Donkorkrom from 2019 until its elevation to a diocese.

== Biography ==
=== Early life and priesthood ===
John Alphonse Asiedu was born on 12 May 1962 in Adeemmra, Ghana. He joined the Society of the Divine Word (S.V.D.) in 1988 and studied philosophy at St. Victor's Major Seminary in Tamale. Following a period of missionary training in Mexico, he returned to Ghana to complete his theological studies and was ordained to the priesthood on 19 July 1997.

His priestly ministry included roles as assistant priest in Kwahu Tafo, Provincial Treasurer for the S.V.D. in Accra, and novice master at the Divine Word Novitiate in Nkwatia-Kwahu.

=== Episcopal ministry ===
On 11 February 2019, Pope Francis appointed Asiedu as the Vicar Apostolic of the Apostolic Vicariate of Donkorkrom. He received his episcopal consecration on 4 May 2019 from Archbishop Philip Naameh.

On 12 May 2026, the Holy See elevated the Apostolic Vicariate of Donkorkrom to the status of a full Diocese. Asiedu was subsequently appointed as the first Diocesan Bishop of the Diocese of Donkorkrom, becoming a suffragan of the Archdiocese of Accra.
