= Bishop Bowers School =

Private Catholic preparatory school in Ghana

- Lartebiorkorshie, Accra; Greater Accra Region; P. O. Box MP 1920, Mamprobi- Accra; Ghana

Information
- Type: Private Catholic Preparatory School
- Motto: "Knowledge, Love and Service"
- Established: 1975; 51 years ago
- Head of school: Sister Matilda Quist, SSpS
- Colours: Yellow and blue
- Affiliation: Catholic Archdiocese of Accra
- Website: http://bishopbowersschool.com/

Bishop Bowers School is a private school under the Catholic Archdiocese of Accra. It was founded by the Missionary Sisters, Servants of the Holy Spirit, commonly identified by the acronym SSpS, in 1975. Since its inception, has been headed by Missionary Sisters from the religious congregation within the Catholic Church. Bishop Bowers is a preparatory school with a kindergarten, primary and junior high school department. The kindergarten and primary department is located in Lartebiokorshie, and the junior high school is located in Korle-Bu.

== History ==
Bishop Bowers School was founded by the Missionary Sisters, Servants of the Holy Spirit, in 1975. It was named after the Late Bishop Emeritus of Accra, Bishop Joseph Oliver Bowers, in commemoration of his efforts in promoting education in the then Catholic diocese of Accra (now Catholic archdiocese of Accra). In September 1975, Sis. Virginalis, SSpS from Netherlands, together with five teachers and two office staff members moved from sister school St. Theresa's School to start the school. The school opened its doors to 226 pupils from kindergarten to class 5. These were pupils who lived around Larterbiorkorshie, Mamprobi and Korle-Bu, but attended St. Theresa's School (also founded by Missionary Sisters, Servants of the Holy Spirit) in North Kaneshie.

== Curriculum ==
Teaching syllabus used in providing pupils and students with basic education is in accordance with the approved Ghana Education Service (GES) syllabus in preparation to sit the Basic Education Certificate Examination (BECE), conducted by the West African Examination Council (WAEC), needed to gain admissions into Senior High Schools.

== Primary ==
The primary department is located at No.3 Hutton Mills Street, Zoti, Lartebiokorshie. It has three main blocks which makes up the administration, classrooms and assemblyhall, computer laboratory, canteen, lavatories, a library and staff common room. There is also a large playground.

== Junior high school ==
In 1987, a request for the release of land to establish a junior high school was sent to the secretary of health through the medical administrator of Korle-Bu Teaching Hospital. Land was offered near the nurses' flats for the construction of Bishop Bowers Junior High School.

== Class structures ==
Both primary and junior high school department have classes with two streams. The KG1 classes are named after co-founders of the Missionary Sisters Servants of the Holy Spirit.

The KG2 classes are named after the Holy Spirit Missionary Congregation Sisters to first arrive in Ghana in 1946.

Each primary class is named after a flower.

The junior high school classes are named after saints, to inspire exemplary behaviour.

== Former headteachers ==
- Virginalis SSpS
- Velma SSpS
- Mary Lauren SSpS
- Theresa SSpS
- Juliana Agbozo SSpS
- Mercy Benson SSpS
- Matilda Quist SSpS
