= Joseph Francis Kweku Essien =

Ghanaian Catholic prelate (born 1957)

The Most Reverend Joseph Francis Kweku Essien
- Bishop Emeritus of Wiawso, Ghana
- Church: Catholic Church
- Archdiocese: Roman Catholic Archdiocese of Cape Coast
- See: Roman Catholic Diocese of Wiawso
- Appointed: 22 December 1999
- Installed: 25 March 2000
- Term ended: 26 January 2023
- Predecessor: Diocese created
- Successor: Samuel Nkuah-Boateng

Orders
- Ordination: 10 July 1977 by Joseph Amihere Essuah
- Consecration: 25 March 2000 by Peter Kodwo Appiah Turkson
- Rank: Bishop

Personal details
- Born: Joseph Francis Kweku Essien; 15 August 1945 (age 80) Apowa, Diocese of Sekondi-Takoradi, Western Region, Ghana
- Motto: "Your will, not mine, be done"

Styles of Joseph Francis Kweku Essien
- Reference style: Your Lordship; The Most Reverend
- Spoken style: His Lordship
- Religious style: Bishop

Joseph Francis Kweku Essien (born 25 November 1945) is a Ghanaian Catholic prelate who was the bishop of the Roman Catholic Diocese of Wiawso in Ghana from 22 December 1999 until his age-related retirement on 26 January 2023. Before that, from 10 July 1977 until he was appointed bishop, he was a priest of the Roman Catholic Diocese of Sekondi-Takoradi. He was appointed bishop on 22 December 1999 by Pope John Paul II. He was consecrated and installed at Wiawso, Ghana on 25 March 2000. While in retirement, he served as apostolic administrator of Wiawso Diocese from 26 January until 21 April 2023.

== Background and education ==
He was born on 25 November 1945 in Apowa, Diocese of Sekondi-Takoradi, Western Region, Ghana. Other reliable sources give his birthplace as "Nkroful, near Sekondi". He studied at Fijai Secondary School from 1961 until 1966. He then transferred to Saint Teresa's Minor Seminary, Amisano in Elmina, where he studied from 1969 until 1971. He then entered Saint Peter's Regional Seminary, Pedu in Cape Coast, where he studied Philosophy and Theology from 1971 until 1977. In 1991, he studied at the Ghana Military Academy, graduating, later that year as a Lieutenant.

== Priest ==
On 10 July 1977, he was ordained a Catholic priest for the Diocese of Sekondi-Takoradi. He served as a priest until 22 Dec 1999.

While a priest, he served in various roles and locations including:

- Assisting Priest at St. Agatha Parish, Sefwi Asafo from 1977 until 1980.
- Assisting Priest Star of the Sea Cathedral Parish, Takoradi from 1980 until 1981.
- Training at Ghana Military Academy, graduating as a Lieutenant from 1981 until 1982.
- Chaplain in the Ghana Armed Forces at 6 Garrison, Tamale from 1982 until 1987.
- Chaplain in the Ghana Armed Forces at Second Battalion of Infantry, Apremdo, Takoradi from 1987 until 1990.
- Chaplain in the Ghana Armed Forces at General Headquarters Burma Camp, Accra from 1990 until 1999.
- While in the Ghana Armed Forces, served in three peacekeeping missions in (a) Lebanon from 1984 until 1985 (b) Liberia in 1992 (c) Lebanon in 1994 and (d) Lebanon in 1999.

== Bishop ==
On 22 December 1999, Pope John Paul II created the Diocese of Wiawso, a suffragan of the Archdiocese of Cape Coast in Ghana. The Holy Father appointed Father Joseph Francis Kweku Essien, previously a member of the clergy of the Diocese of Sekondi-Takoradi, to be the pioneer bishop of the new diocese. He was consecrated and installed at Wiawso on 25 March 2000 by the hands of Archbishop Peter Kodwo Appiah Turkson, Archbishop of Cape Coast assisted by Archbishop Dominic Kodwo Andoh, Archbishop of Accra and Archbishop André Pierre Louis Dupuy, Titular Archbishop of Selsea.

On 26 January 2023, The Holly Father accepted the "resignation from the pastoral care of the diocese of Wiawso, Ghana, presented by Bishop Joseph Francis Kweku Essien". The Holy Father appointed Father Samuel Nkuah-Boateng, of the clergy of Wiawso, as bishop of the same diocese. While in retirement, Bishop Joseph Francis Kweku Essien served as apostolic administrator of the Diocese of Wiawso from the date he retired until 25 April 2023, the date his successor was consecrated and installed.

== See also ==
- Catholic Church in Ghana

== Succession table ==
Preceded by (Diocese created)	Bishop of Wiawso (22 December 1999 - 26 January 2023)	Succeeded by Samuel Nkuah-Boateng (since 26 January 2023)
