= Samuel Nkuah-Boateng =

Ghanaian Catholic prelate (born in 1968)

The Most Reverend Samuel Nkuah-Boateng
- Bishop of Wiawso, Ghana
- Church: Catholic Church
- Archdiocese: Roman Catholic Archdiocese of Cape Coast
- See: Roman Catholic Diocese of Wiawso
- Appointed: 26 January 2023
- Installed: 21 April 2023
- Predecessor: Joseph Francis Kweku Essien
- Successor: Incumbent

Orders
- Ordination: 28 July 2001
- Consecration: 21 April 2023 by Henryk Mieczysław Jagodziński
- Rank: Bishop

Personal details
- Born: Samuel Nkuah-Boateng; 6 May 1968 (age 57) Sefwi Bosomoiso, Western North Region, Ghana

Styles of Samuel Nkuah-Boateng
- Reference style: Your Lordship; The Most Reverend
- Spoken style: His Lordship
- Religious style: Bishop

Samuel Nkuah-Boateng (born 6 May 1968) is a Ghanaian Catholic prelate who is the bishop of the Roman Catholic Diocese of Wiawso in Ghana, since 26 January 2023. Before that, from 28 July 2001 until he was appointed bishop, he was a Catholic priest of the same Catholic Diocese. He was appointed bishop by Pope Francis. He was consecrated and installed at Wiawso, on 21 April 2023.

== Background and education ==
Samuel Nkuah-Boateng was born on 6 May 1968 at Sefwi Bosomoiso, Western North Region, Ghana. He attended Saint Teresa's Minor Seminary in Elmina, in the Archdiocese of Cape Coast. He then transferred to Saint Peter's Regional Major Seminary in Cape Coast. He graduated with a Bachelor of Arts degree in sociology and religious studies from the University of Ghana. Later, he studied at the Catholic University College of Ghana from 2015 until 2017, graduating with a Master's degree pastoral ministry and religious education. He continued his studies there from 2018 until 2020, and was awarded a Master's degree in philosophy.

== Priest ==
On 28 July 2001, Samuel Nkuah-Boateng was ordained a priest of the Roman Catholic Diocese of Wiawso, Ghana. He served as priest until 26 January 2023. As a priest he served in various roles and locations, including:

- Parish vicar of the Immaculate Conception, in Enchi from 2001 until 2003.
- Secretary to the bishop of Wiawso from 2003 until 2008.
- Rector of Saint Mary's Seminary in Dwinase from 2003 until 2009.
- Parish priest of Saint Augustine in Sefwi Boako from 2009 until 2011.
- Director of the pastoral and formation centre from 2009 until 2018.
- Administrator of the Cathedral of Wiawso from 2011 until 2018.
- President of the Association of Diocesan Priests from 2012 until 2020.
- Studies for a master's degree in pastoral ministry and religious education at the Catholic University of Ghana from 2015 until 2017.
- Studies for a master's degree in philosophy from 2018 until 2020.
- Member of the College of Consultors and the Presbyteral College since 2009.
- Director of the Centre for Pastoral Ministry and Formation since 2020.
- Coordinator of the diocesan Commission for Justice and Peace since 2020.
- Administrator of the Cathedral of Wiawso since 2020.

== Bishop ==
On 26 January 2023, Pope Francis appointed Father Samuel Nkuah-Boateng, previously a member of the clergy of Wiawso Diocese, as bishop of the same diocese, a suffragan of the Metropolitan Ecclesiastical Province of Cape Coast.

He was consecrated bishop and installed at Wiawso on 21 April 2023 by Archbishop Henryk Mieczysław Jagodziński, Titular Archbishop of Limosano assisted by Archbishop Gabriel Charles Palmer-Buckle, Archbishop of Cape Coast and Bishop Joseph Francis Kweku Essien, Bishop Emeritus of Wiawso.

== See also ==
- Catholic Church in Ghana

== Succession table ==
Catholic Church titles
| Preceded by Joseph Francis Kweku Essien (22 December 1999 - 26 January 2023) | Bishop of Wiawso (since 26 January 2023) | Succeeded by Incumbent |
