= Anthony Narh Asare =

Ghanaian Catholic bishop (born 1965)

Most Reverend Anthony Narh Asare
- Auxiliary Bishop of Accra
- Church: Roman Catholic Church
- Archdiocese: Archdiocese of Accra
- Province: Accra
- Appointed: 14 February 2023
- Installed: 19 April 2023
- Other post: Titular Bishop of Castellum in Numidia

Orders
- Ordination: 22 July 1995
- Consecration: 19 April 2023 by Henryk Mieczysław Jagodziński

Personal details
- Born: December 29, 1965 (age 60) Odumase-Krobo, Ghana
- Denomination: Roman Catholic

Anthony Narh Asare (born 29 December 1965) is a Ghanaian Prelate of the Catholic Church who has served as an auxiliary bishop for the Archdiocese of Accra since 2023.

== Early life and education ==
Anthony Narh Asare was born in Odumase-Krobo, Ghana, on 29 December 1965. He attended Pope John Secondary School and Junior Seminary in Koforidua. He later pursued his priestly formation at St. Paul's Major Seminary in Sowutuom before proceeding to St. Peter's Regional Seminary in Pedu, Cape Coast, where he completed his theological studies.

After ordination, he furthered his education at the Catholic Institute of West Africa (CIWA) in Port Harcourt, Nigeria, obtaining a licentiate in Sacred Theology.

== Ministry ==
He was ordained a priest on 22 July 1995 for the Archdiocese of Accra. Over the years, he held various pastoral and administrative roles, including:

Parish Priest, St. Bakhita Catholic Church, Community 20, Tema Parish Priest, Christ the King Catholic Church, Cantonments Chaplain, St. Thomas Aquinas Senior High School Chaplain, Catholic Students Union (CATHSU) - University of Ghana Director, Department of Pastoral and Social Communication, Archdiocese of Accra

He also served as a member of the College of Consultors of the Archdiocese and was deeply involved in media evangelization through Radio Angelus, an online Catholic radio platform in Ghana.

== Episcopal Appointment ==
On 14 February 2023, Pope Francis appointed him Auxiliary Bishop of the Archdiocese of Accra and Titular Bishop of Castellum in Numidia. He was consecrated as bishop on 19 April 2023 at the Holy Spirit Cathedral, Accra.

=== Episcopal Consecration ===
His principal consecrator was Henryk Mieczysław Jagodziński, Titular Archbishop of Limosano and the then Apostolic Nuncio to Ghana. His co-consecrators were: John Bonaventure Kwofie, C.S.Sp., Archbishop of Accra Matthew Kwasi Gyamfi, Bishop of Sunyani

== See also ==
- Roman Catholic Archdiocese of Accra
- Catholic Church in Ghana
- List of Catholic bishops in Ghana
