= Andrew Campbell (priest) =

Irish-Ghanaian catholic missionary

The Very Reverend Andrew Campbell
- Church: St. Jude Catholic Church, Korkordzor, New Weija
- Province: Accra
- Diocese: Accra
- Successor: Incumbent

Orders
- Ordination: December 1970

Personal details
- Born: Andrew Campbell; 27 March 1946 (age 80) Dublin, Ireland
- Denomination: Roman Catholic
- Occupation: Clergyman

Rev. Fr. Andrew Campbell (born March 27, 1946) is an Irish-Ghanaian catholic missionary, founder of Lepers Aid Committee and former parish priest of Christ the King Catholic Church in Accra. Born in Dublin, Ireland, he had his early education at Sisters of Charity School and de la Salle Primary School in Ireland. In October 1970, he obtained a Bachelor of Divinity from St. Patrick's College.

== Priesthood and work ==
Campbell was ordained as a catholic priest in December 1970, he was posted to Ghana as a missionary priest under The Society of the Divine Word a year after.

He has served in many catholic Parishes in Accra, including Holy Spirit Cathedral, Adabraka, St, Peter's Parish, Osu, Sacred Heart Parish Accra, where he established the Sacred Heart Vocational Institute. He founded the Lepers Aid committee in 1993 to care for persons with leprosy. The NGO has established and run leprosariums in Weija, Ho, Nkanchina and Kokofu. He has also founded The Christ The King Soup Kitchen.

In 2013, Andrew Campbell acquired Ghanaian citizenship. He also acquired Nii Lantey as his local name.

== Recognition and awards ==
He has received several honors due to his humanitarian activities.

Recognition and Awards
Role/ Awards	Institution	Reference
Grand Medal Honorary Division	Government of Ghana (2001)	
Chairman - Advisory Board	Princess Marie Louise Children's Hospital	
Humanitarian Personality of the Year	2018 Made In Ghana Awards (MIGA)	
Humanitarian Lifetime Achievement Award	2017 National Philanthropy Forum and Excellence Awards	
Humanitarian Award	2020 Exclusive Men of the Year Africa Awards (EMY Awards)	

== See also ==
- Charles G. Palmer-Buckle
- Peter Turkson
