= Diocese of Koforidua =

Roman Catholic diocese in Ghana

Coordinates: 6.0933°N 0.2520°W

Diocese of Koforidua Dioecesis Koforiduana

Location
- Country: Ghana
- Ecclesiastical province: Archdiocese of Accra

Statistics
- Area: 18,600 km^{2} (7,200 sq mi)
- Population: Total; Catholics: (as of 2004); 2,100,000; 201,335 (9.6%)
- Schools: 330

Information
- Denomination: Roman Catholic
- Rite: Roman Rite
- Established: 6 July 1992
- Cathedral: St. George's Cathedral, Koforidua
- Secular priests: 51

Current leadership
- Pope: Leo XIV
- Bishop: Joseph Kwaku Afrifah-Agyekum
- Metropolitan Archbishop: John Bonaventure Kwofie; Archbishop of Accra

Website
- kofdiocese.org

The Roman Catholic Diocese of Koforidua (Latin: Dioecesis Koforiduana) is a diocese located in the city of Koforidua in the ecclesiastical province of Accra in Ghana.

== History ==
- 6 July 1992: Established as Diocese of Koforidua from the Diocese of Accra.
- 12 June 2007: from this Diocese was split off the Apostolic Prefecture of Donkorkrom.

== Special churches ==
The Cathedral is St. George’s Cathedral in Koforidua.

== Leadership ==
- Bishops of Koforidua (Roman rite)
  - Bishop Charles G. Palmer-Buckle (July 6, 1992– March 30, 2005) appointed Archbishop of Accra
  - Bishop Joseph Kwaku Afrifah-Agyekum (since April 12, 2006)

== See also ==
- Roman Catholicism in Ghana

== Sources ==
- GCatholic.org
- Catholic Hierarchy
