= Diocese of Wiawso =

Roman Catholic diocese in Ghana

Coordinates: 6.2170°N 2.4821°W

Diocese of Wiawso Dioecesis Sekondiensis-Takoradiensis

Location
- Country: Ghana
- Metropolitan: Cape Coast

Statistics
- Area: 8,696 km^{2} (3,358 sq mi)
- Population: Total; Catholics: (as of 2004); 597,163; 160,514 (26.9%)

Information
- Rite: Latin Rite

Current leadership
- Pope: Leo XIV
- Bishop: Samuel Nkuah-Boateng
- Bishops emeritus: Joseph Francis Kweku Essien

The Catholic Diocese of Wiawso (Latin: Viavsen(sis)) is a diocese located in Wiawso in the ecclesiastical province of Cape Coast in Ghana.

== History ==
- December 22, 1999: Established as Diocese of Wiawso from the Diocese of Sekondi–Takoradi

== Special churches ==
The Cathedral is Cathedral of St. Joseph in Wiawso.

== Leadership ==
- Bishops of Wiawso (Roman rite)
  - Bishop Joseph Francis Kweku Essien (22 December 1999 - 26 January 2023)
  - Bishop Samuel Nkuah-Boateng (since 26 January 2023)

== See also ==
- Catholicism in Ghana

== Sources ==
- GCatholic.org
- Catholic Hierarchy
