= Apremodo, Ghana =

Apremdo
- Country: Ghana
- Region: Western Region (Ghana)

Apremdo is a town in the Western region of Ghana. It is about 8 kilometres from Takoradi the regional capital. Apart from it serving as a dormitory town for many of the workers who work around Takoradi, it also serves as a military base for the 2nd Infantry battalion of the Ghana Army. Again, part of the town houses the expanded part of the Market Circle, Takoradi's main market.

== Boundary ==
The town is bounded to the west and south and east by Takoradi, to the north by Kwesimintsim and to the west by Apowa
