= Sowutuom =

- Location within Ghana
- Coordinates: 5°37′26″N 0°16′44″W
- Country: Ghana
- Region: Greater Accra Region
- District: Ga Central District

Anyaa Sowutuom, popularly simply called Sowutuom, is a suburban town near Omanjor in the Greater Accra Region of Ghana. In 2012, Ga Central District was created with Sowutuom as its capital.

It has several tertiary education institutions, and a soccer team including the Pentecost University and Sowutuom United fc

== Member of Parliament ==
- Doctor Kissi

== Universities ==
- Maranatha University
- Pentecost University

== Seminary ==
The Roman Catholic Archdiocese of Accra set up the St. Paul's Catholic Seminary in 1988 which has produced over 500 priests since its inception.

== Police Station ==
The Sowutuom police station is situated near the St. Paul's Catholic Seminary.

== See also ==
- Geography of Ghana
