= Diocese of Jasikan =

Roman Catholic diocese in Ghana

Coordinates: 7.4064°N 0.4684°E

Diocese of Jasikan Iasikanensis

Location
- Country: Ghana
- Metropolitan: Accra

Statistics
- Area: 8,637 km^{2} (3,335 sq mi)
- Population: Total; Catholics: (as of 2004); 557,828; 147,688 (26.5%)

Information
- Denomination: Catholic Church
- Rite: Latin Rite

Current leadership
- Pope: Leo XIV
- Bishop: Simon Kofi Appiah
- Bishops emeritus: Gabriel Akwasi Abiabo Mante

The Roman Catholic Diocese of Jasikan (Latin: Iasikanen(sis)) is a diocese located in the city of Jasikan in the ecclesiastical province of Accra in Ghana.

== History ==
- December 19, 1994: Established as Diocese of Jasikan from Diocese of Keta–Ho

== Leadership ==
Bishops of Jasikan (Roman rite)

- Bishop Gabriel Akwasi Abiabo Mante (1994 – 2025), retired
- Bishop Simon Kofi Appiah (2025 – present)

== See also ==
- Roman Catholicism in Ghana

== Sources ==
- GCatholic.org
- Catholic Hierarchy
