= Parish of St Sylvanus, Pokuase =

Roman Catholic church in Ghana

The Roman Catholic parish of St. Sylvanus is in the Accra suburb of Pokuase in Ghana. It centres on the church of St. Sylvanus, which opened in 1948. St Sylvanus was established as a parish in 2014, after being a rectorate since 2006.

== History ==
The church of St. Sylvanus, Pokuase, was established in 1948 near the Pokuase Agricultural Workers Quarters.

In 1992, Rev. Fr. Miguel Oppong took over from Fr Bobby Benson as Parish Priest of St. Kizito. He started the foundation of the present church building in 1998. The sod was cut by the late Archbishop Emeritus Most Rev. Dominic Andoh. The Parish Pastoral Council (PPC) Chairman was Mr. George Amoah and Mr. Jarvis Nuworsah the chairman of the Planning Committee. The late Fr. Lawrence Duho, an assistant to Fr. Oppong also helped immensely to build on what their predecessor had done.

In March 1999, the late Fr. Patrick Charkitey was made the Parish Priest to succeed Fr. Miguel Oppong. During his time his assistant was Fr. Matthias Kotoka Amuzu. After Fr. Charkiteys death Fr. Amuzu worked with the Pokuase Church for a short period. When Fr. Amuzu was left alone at Nima, Rev. Father Benjamin Poku Donkor then working at the National Catholic Secretariat celebrate mass at St Sylvanus Pokuase.

Fr. Mintah took over from Fr. Charkitey and it was during his time that renovation work was started on the old school building but he could not complete it before he was transferred. Fr. Edmund Ekow Neizer took over from Fr. Mintah and completed renovations work on the school building, worked on the church building and roofed it. He converted the piggery into a classroom block.

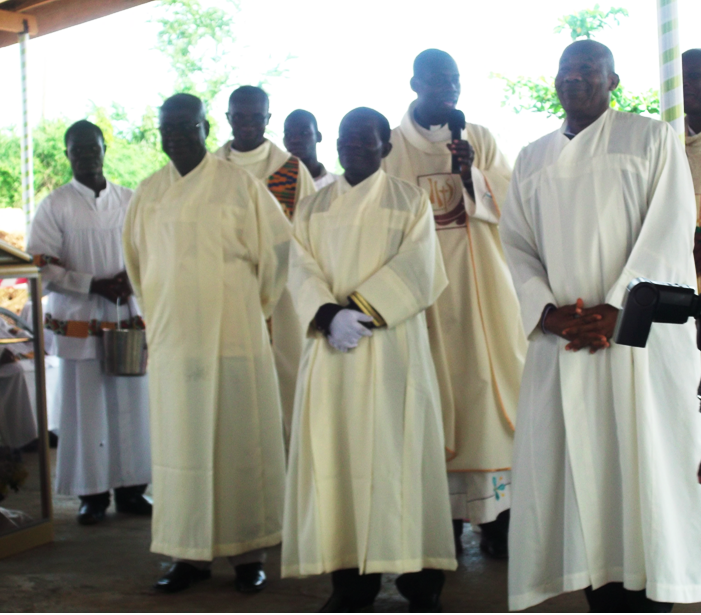
Extraordinary Ministers of the Holy Eucharist in Pokuase Rectorate

On 11 June 2006, the St. Sylvanus was elevated to a rectorate.

The church was elevated to a parish on Sunday 7 September 2014.

== Bishops ==
The bishops at Pokuase include:

- Joseph Oliver Bowers
- Dominic Kodwo Andoh
