= Ita (Africa) =

Ita was an ancient city and former bishopric in Roman North Africa, now a Latin Catholic titular see in Algeria.

== History ==
Media was important enough in the Roman province of Mauretania Caesariensis to become one of the many suffragan dioceses, but was to fade completely, no ruins being identified.

Its only historically documented bishop was Lucius, who attended the Council of Carthage in 484 called by the Arian king Huneric of the Vandal Kingdom, after which he was banished like most Catholic participants, unlike the Donatist heretical counterparts.

== Titular see ==
The diocese was nominally restored in 1933 as Latin titular bishopric of Ita (Latin = Curiate Italian) / Iten(sis) (Latin adjective).

It is vacant, having had the following incumbents, so far of the fitting Episcopal (lowest) rank:

- Tadeusz Stanisław Szwagrzyk (1964.11.03 – death 1992.12.07) as Auxiliary Bishop of Archdiocese of Częstochowa (Poland) (1964.11.03 – 1992.12.07)
- James Anthony Tamayo (1993.01.26 – 2000.07.03) as Auxiliary Bishop of Diocese of Galveston–Houston (Texas, USA) (1993.01.26 – 2000.07.03); later first Bishop of Laredo (Texas, USA) (2000.07.03 – ...)
- Pedro Luiz Stringhini (2001.01.03 – 2009.12.30) as Auxiliary Bishop of Archdiocese of São Paulo (Brazil) (2001.01.03 – 2009.12.30); later Bishop of Franca (Brazil) (2009.12.30 – 2012.09.19), Bishop of Mogi das Cruzes (Brazil) (2012.09.19 – ...)
- Gabriel Edoe Kumordji, Divine Word Missionaries (S.V.D.) (2010.01.19 – 2017.03.16) as first Apostolic Vicar of Donkorkrom (Ghana) (2010.01.19 – 2017.03.16); previously last Prefect Apostolic of Donkorkrom (2007.06.12 – 2010.01.19); later Bishop of Keta–Akatsi (Ghana) (2017.03.16 – ...).

== See also ==
- List of Catholic dioceses in Algeria

== Sources and external links ==
- GCatholic - titular see

Bibliography

- Pius Bonifacius Gams, Series episcoporum Ecclesiae Catholicae, Leipzig 1931, p. 466
- Stefano Antonio Morcelli, Africa christiana, Volume I, Brescia 1816, p. 191
