= Takoradi Market Circle =

Coordinates: 4.898°N 1.760°W

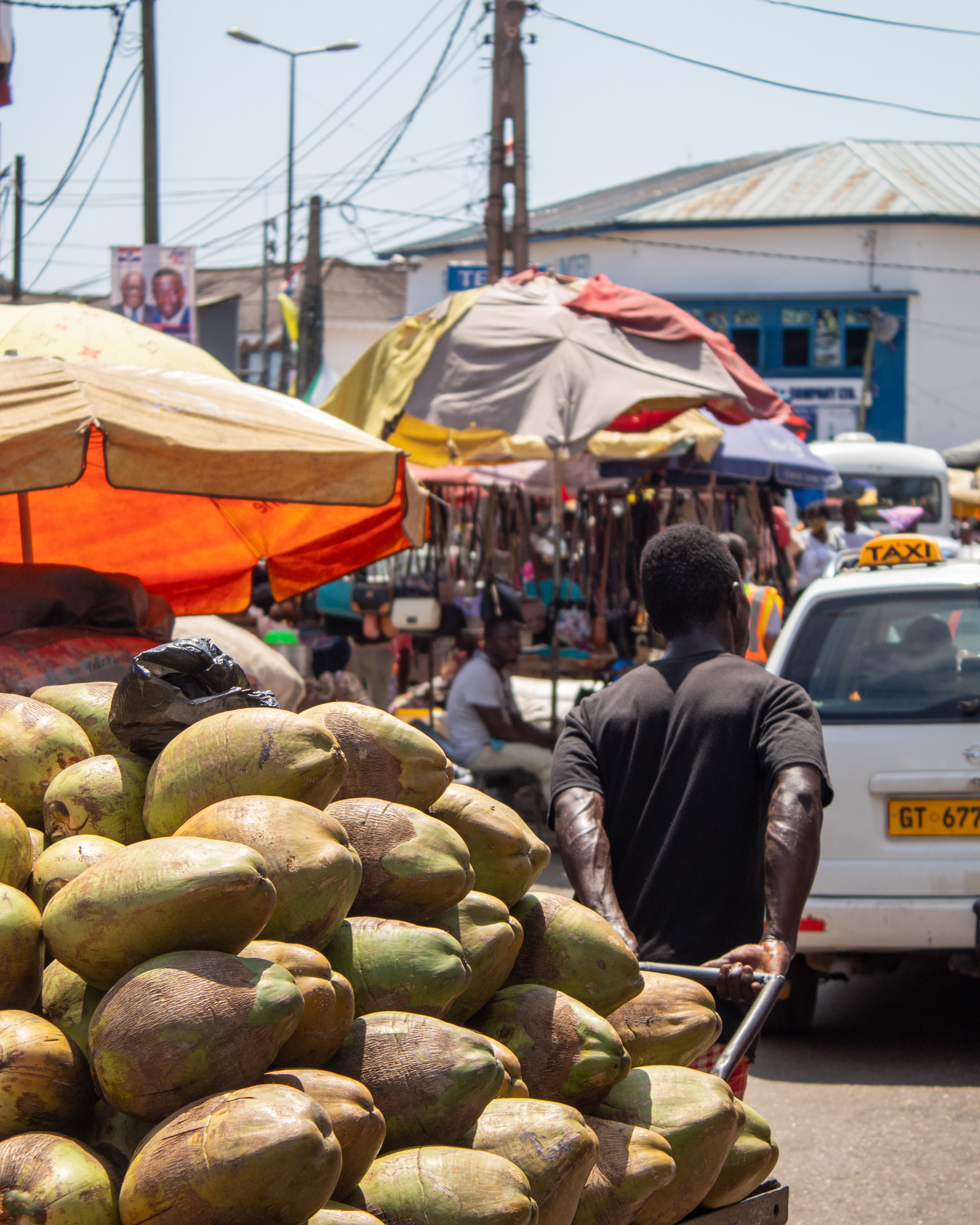
Fresh coconuts in Takoradi Market Circle.

The Takoradi Market Circle is a market in Takoradi, the third largest city of Ghana. Takoradi Market Circle is the commercial and economic hub of Ghana's Western Region. The market got its name due to the large circle in which it is situated; the stores of the market were built to form the shape. A renovation project started in September 2020 by Nana Akufo Addo and his government, of which sod was being cut by the Vice-president Dr. Mahamadu Bawumia.

== History ==
The market was planned and built by city engineers to form the nucleus of trading for the new Takoradi city. The city became bustling after the building of the Takoradi Harbour, which served as a major export centre because of high export activity, many people migrated to the city for employment and this increase warranted the setting up the market. It was to be built at a site that was to be easily accessible.

== Accessibility ==
The market's site makes it probably the most accessible point in the whole of the Takoradi metropolis. Major road lead to it. The John Mensah Sarbah road links the market from the South West and from the North East. The Liberation road linking it from the South East through the market to the North West. Other roads that access the market are the Ashanti Road and the Ahanata road.

== Major activities ==
All kinds of economic activities go on in and around the market. They include:

- Banking
- Trading of goods
- Sale of food produce

Most of the major banks in the country have branches around the market area. They include:

- Ecobank
- UniBank
- Zenith Bank
- Ghana Commercial Bank
- AmalBank
- CAL Bank
- Fidelity Bank
- Stanbic Bank
- Access Bank
- Societe General Bank
- Guaranty Trust Bank
- Opportunity Bank

== Hawkers ==
Many people who do not have stalls in the market rather prefer to sell their goods through hawking. These hawkers take over all the pedestrian walkways, parking spaces and built wooden sheds and warehouses, making the market circle untidy, dirty and congested. This is generally prohibited as it makes the regulation of market activities difficult as well as increase vehicular and human traffic. At occasions when the City guards, who serve as market law enforcement officials relax in the duty due to several reasons, these hawkers take to the streets and spaces around to market. Evicting these people once they have started their illegal activities becomes expensive and time-consuming. Eviction exercises make pedestrian movement easier, faster and convenient.

== Market expansion ==
The market became congested in the late 1980s. The problem became worse in the early 1990s when the city authorities could no longer allocate space for individuals who had requested for stores, stalls etc. As such a new market was planned and built at Apremodo. Apremodo is a suburb of Takoradi and about 10 kilometres from the Market Circle.

== Sanitation ==
A major problem of the market is that of filth. Due to the size of the market as well as the number of people who use it daily, there is always need to keep the market clean. In February 2011, the Sekondi-Takoradi Metropolitant Assembly (STMA), the government agency that has among its responsibilities market sanitation, engaged Zoomlion, a waste management company to keep the market clean.

== Fires at the Market ==
Like many big markets in Ghana, fires cause the most destruction to markets. The market has had a lot of fire outbreaks with most destroying properties running in several hundreds of thousands of Cedis. The most recent one was on 16 March 2007 when properties worth millions of cedis were lost when fire swept through portions of the market. It burnt quantities of goods to ashes. The fire started around 1830 hours, was finally brought under control around 2300 hours. No casualties were recorded. After starting at one point, the fire quickly spread to other parts of the market destroying cooking oil, palm oil, cooking utensils, rubber products, foodstuffs and cloths, fowls, animals, shoes, bags and cereals, among others. In situations like this it take the intervention of fire personnel situated close to the market to bring the fires down.
