= Paul Azunre =

Ghanaian-American AI researcher (born 1984)

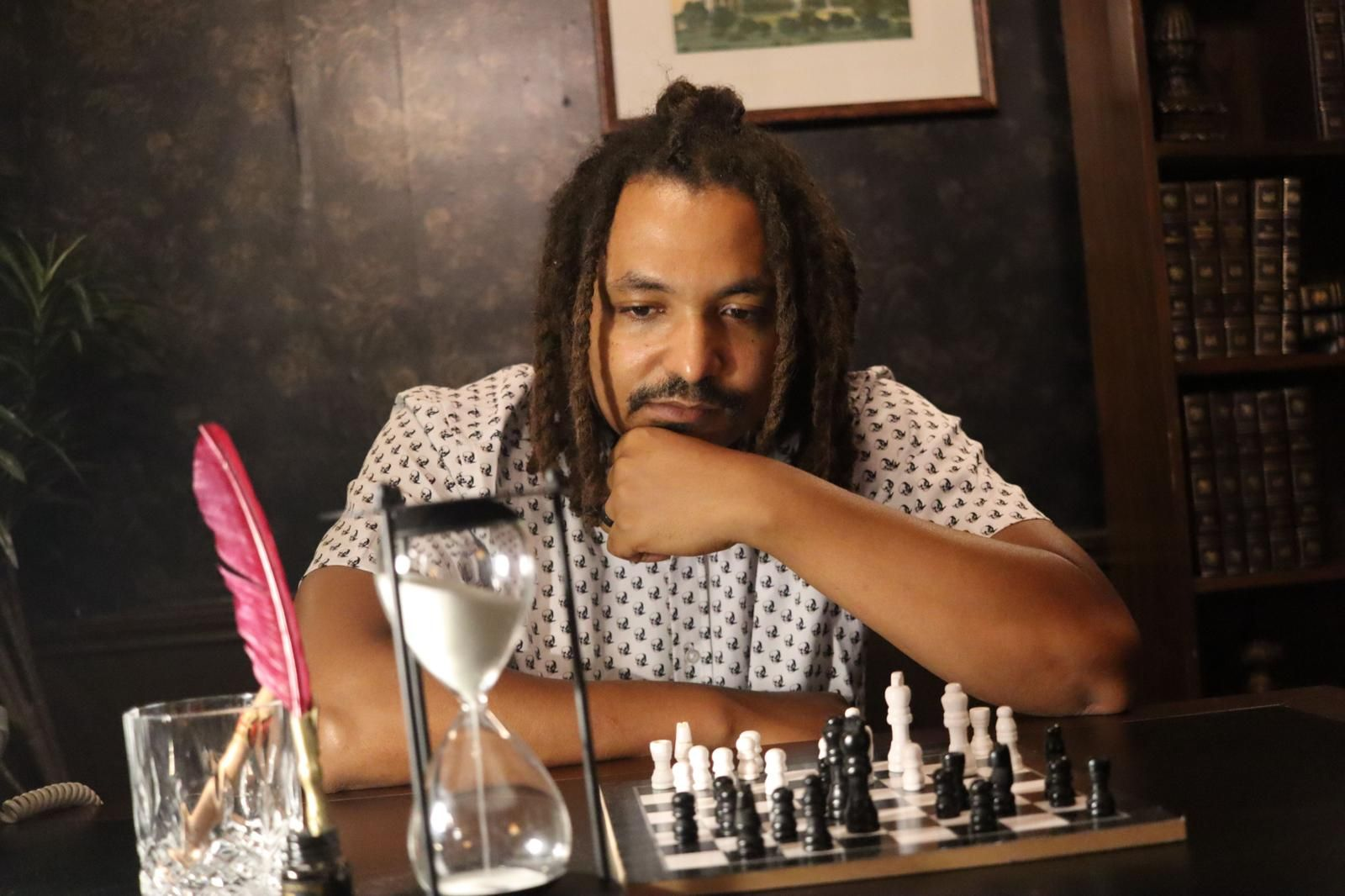
- Born: April 14, 1984 (age 41); Pokuase, Ghana
- Citizenship: Ghanaian
- Education: Massachusetts Institute of Technology
- Website: www.azunre.com

Paul Azunre (born April 14, 1984) is a Ghanaian-American AI researcher, entrepreneur and musician focused on advanced AI and optimization technologies.

Azunre is the founder of Algorine Inc, a research lab focused on advanced AI and optimization technologies.

He is also the co-founder of Ghana NLP, an open source natural language processing initiative focused on developing NLP models for low-resource African languages

== Early life and education ==
Azunre, born in Ghana attended Opoku Ware School. He then proceeded to Swarthmore College for his undergraduate education, where he studied engineering and economics. He obtained a PhD in Electrical Engineering and Computer Science at the Massachusetts Institute of Technology.

His doctoral research focused on optimization algorithms and their applications in artificial intelligence and machine learning.

== Career ==
Azunre has worked extensively in AI research and development. He served as a Principal Investigator on multiple projects funded by the Defense Advanced Research Projects Agency (DARPA) and has collaborated with various institutions on AI and NLP-related initiatives.

=== Algorine Inc. ===
Azunre founded Algorine Inc., a research lab dedicated to advancing artificial intelligence and machine learning solutions for various industries, including finance, healthcare, and cybersecurity.

=== Ghana NLP ===
Azunre co-founded Ghana NLP, an initiative aimed at building NLP tools for Ghanaian and other African languages. The project focuses on improving digital inclusivity by enabling AI-powered applications to process and understand indigenous languages more effectively.

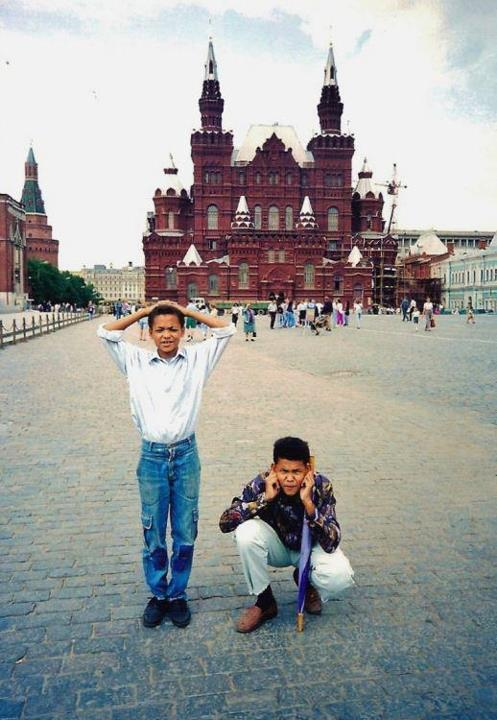

== Music ==
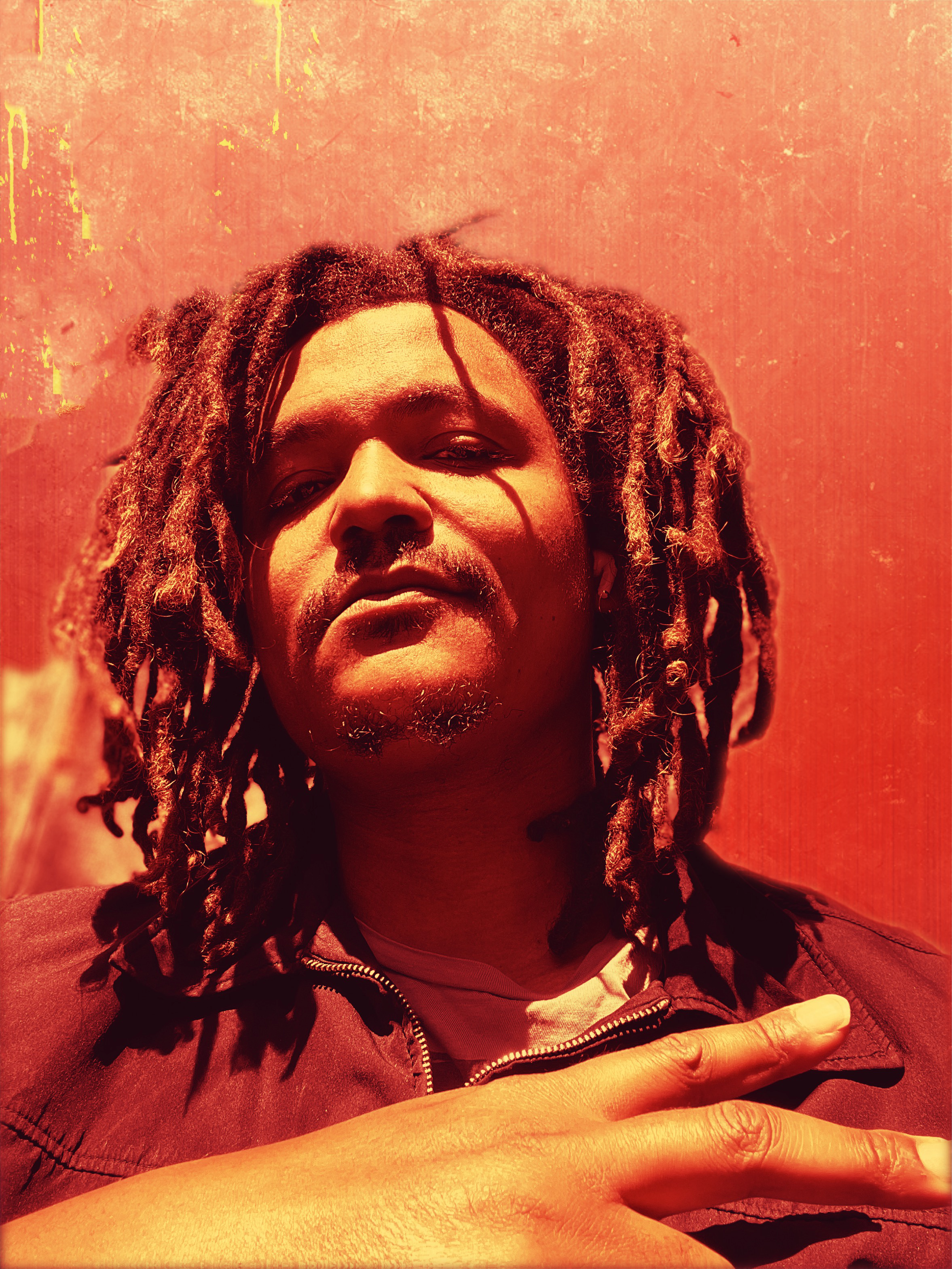
Dr.Pushkin

Dr. Paul Azunre, professionally known as Dr. Pushkin, is a Ghanaian Hip-Hop and Afrofusion artist known for his unique integration of technology and music.

He has released several musical projects, most notably the album Math, Beats & Flow, which showcases his innovative blend of African rhythms, Hip-Hop, and scientific themes. His work is characterized by a strong independent ethos and a deep appreciation for Hip-Hop culture, African musical traditions, and thought-provoking lyrical content.

In 2022, Dr. Pushkin experienced a breakthrough, with four of his singles entering the Official Ghanaian Top 20 YouTube charts. That same year, his collaborations with legendary Ghanaian artists Ofori Amponsah and Quata Budukusu gained attention.

His debut solo album, Outlandish was released in 2023 to critical acclaim. He performed tracks from the album at the Official SXSW 2023 Showcase, earning recognition from the Austin Chronicle as one of the "Essential SXSW 2023 Acts."

In 2024, Dr. Pushkin continued to build momentum with collaborations featuring prominent Ghanaian rappers such as Lyrical Joe (Ghanaian Rapper of the Year), Ko-Jo Cue, and CJ Biggerman. These releases resonated strongly with Ghanaian Hip-Hop audiences and gained traction across multiple digital platforms.

His forthcoming dual album project, No Heroes / No Miracles, includes appearances from artists such as Strongman, Eno Barony, Stevo Atambire, B-Wayne, Obibini, and AlaptaWan. The project has already earned him a first-round selection for SXSW 2025.

Dr. Pushkin is also a founding member of the musical group Isolirium, alongside Ataman Nikita and, more recently, TeriWiizi. He cites 2Pac, Nas, and Obrafour as major artistic influences.

== Publications ==
Azunre is the author of Transfer Learning for Natural Language Processing, a book that explores the applications of transfer learning techniques in NLP. His work has been cited in various academic and industry publications.

== Recognition and Contributions ==
His contributions to AI and NLP have been featured in leading conferences, research papers, and media outlets. He has actively promoted the development of AI technologies tailored to the needs of African communities and has been involved in mentoring young AI researchers and entrepreneurs.

== See also ==
- Natural Language Processing
- Machine Learning
