= John Martin Darko =

John Martin Darko (30 May 1945 – 12 January 2013) was a Ghanaian Roman Catholic bishop.

Ordained to the priesthood in 1976, he was named bishop of Roman Catholic Diocese of Sekondi–Takoradi, Ghana in 1998 and resigned in December 2011 citing health issues.
