= John Bonaventure Kwofie =

Ghanaian Catholic archbishop (born 1958)

His Grace, The Most Reverend, Mgr. John Bonaventure Kwofie, C.S.Sp. S.S.L.
- Metropolitan Archbishop of Accra
- Church: Roman Catholic Church
- Archdiocese: Accra
- Province: Accra
- Appointed: 2 February 2019
- Installed: 19 March 2019
- Predecessor: Charles G. Palmer-Buckle

Orders
- Ordination: 23 July 1988
- Consecration: 13 September 2014 by Peter Turkson

Personal details
- Born: 26 April 1958 (age 68) Apowa, Ghana
- Denomination: Roman Catholic
- Residence: Accra, Ghana
- Occupation: Archbishop, Clergyman
- Education: Pontifical Biblical Institute

John Bonaventure Kwofie, C.S.Sp. (born 26 April 1958) is an archbishop, professed member of the Spiritan Order, prelate, theologian, and philosopher for the Catholic Church in Ghana who has been the metropolitan archbishop of the Roman Catholic Archdiocese of Accra. Previously, he served as the bishop of the Diocese of Sekondi-Takoradi.

To assist in the pastoral administration of the Roman Catholic Archdiocese of Accra, Pope Francis appointed two auxiliary bishops, the Most Rev. Anthony Narh Asare and the Most Rev. John Kobina Louis, in February 2023.

== Biography ==
Kwofie was born in Apowa, Ghana on 26 April 1958. He entered the seminary in Gbanga and studied theology and philosophy there, where he obtained his bachelor's degree. He joined the Spiritan Order on 1987 and ordained as priest on 1988. After his ordination as a priest, he studied in the Biblicum, where he obtained his postgraduate (licentiate) degree on the sacred scripture. On 2002-2004 he became the provincial superior for the Spiritan Order in West Africa. From 2014 until 2019 he was Bishop of Sekondi-Takoradi. On 2 January 2019 Pope Francis appointed him as metropolitan archbishop of Accra to replace The Most. Rev. Charles G. Palmer-Buckle who had been appointed as metropolitan Archbishop of Cape Coast in 2018. He was installed as the metropolitan Archbishop of Accra on 1 March 2019 at The Cathedral Church of The Holy Spirit, Accra.

== Environmental Prayer Walk Against Galamsey (2024) ==
The Environmental Prayer Walk Against Galamsey was an initiative organized by the Catholic Archdiocese of Accra under the leadership of Archbishop John Bonaventure Kwofie, C.S.Sp. in collaboration with the Conference of Major Superiors of Religious – Ghana (CMSR-GH). The event took place on October 11, 2024, and aimed to raise awareness and advocate for action against illegal mining, locally known as galamsey, which has been a major environmental issue in Ghana.

== Background and purpose ==
Illegal mining (galamsey) has been a persistent environmental crisis in Ghana, leading to deforestation, soil degradation, and severe water pollution. The Catholic Church, recognizing the moral and ecological implications of this issue, organized the prayer walk as a demonstration of spiritual advocacy and civic responsibility.

In a letter dated October 4, 2024, Archbishop Kwofie called on all priests, religious leaders, and lay faithful to participate in the walk, emphasizing the Church's commitment to environmental stewardship.

== The Prayer Walk ==
The walk began at Holy Spirit Cathedral, Adabraka, and proceeded through the streets of Accra, concluding at Christ the King Parish, Cantonments. Along the route, participants prayed the Rosary, symbolizing spiritual intervention against the destruction of the environment. The walk ended with a Holy Mass at Christ the King Grotto.

== Archbishop Kwofie's call to action ==
During his homily after the walk, Archbishop Kwofie made a strong appeal to Catholics engaged in illegal mining. He stated:

"I call on all Catholics involved in illegal mining to stop immediately. This practice is not only illegal but is also a grave offense against God's creation and future generations."

He urged miners to abandon galamsey and called on the government to enforce stricter regulations while ensuring sustainable livelihoods for affected communities. His speech was widely covered by the media, including ACI Africa.

== Participation and support ==
The event was attended by priests, religious communities, and lay faithful. Notable groups involved included:

- Knights of St. John International and Ladies Auxiliary
- Knights and Ladies of Marshall

Parish priests were encouraged to mobilize their congregations, and participants were advised to bring bottles of water and white handkerchiefs as symbols of peace.

== Impact and legacy ==
Following the prayer walk, the Catholic Archdiocese of Accra submitted a petition to the Presidency at Jubilee House, urging stronger action against illegal mining. The initiative reinforced the Church's stance on social justice and environmental conservation, sparking discussions on the moral responsibility of individuals and institutions in tackling galamsey.

== See also ==
- Environmental issues in Ghana
