= St. Paul's Catholic Seminary =

- Insignia of Sowutuom
- Motto: Vas Mihi Electionis
- Motto in English: You Are My Chosen Instrument
- Type: Regional Seminary
- Established: January 1988 (38 years ago)
- Affiliations: Roman Catholic Church
- Chairman: Most. Rev. Bonaventure Kwofie, CSsP
- Rector: Very Rev. Fr. Francis Arthur (Ph.D) Vice Rector : Very Rev. Fr. Francis Lemaire
- Dean: Rev. Fr. Joseph Okine-Quartey (Ph.D)
- Spiritual Director: Fr. Albert Amakyi
- Administrative staff: 8
- Students: 231 seminarians
- Location: Sowutuom, Greater Accra Region, Ghana
- Campus: Urban
- Dean of Students: Rev. Fr. Prosper Abotsi (PhD)
- Colors: Yellow and blue
- Nickname: Sowutuom
- Website: stpaulscsem.com
- Data as at September 2018

St. Paul's Catholic Seminary is a Ghanaian Roman Catholic seminary located in Sowutuom, Greater Accra Region.

It is in the Roman Catholic Archdiocese of Accra and is dedicated to the philosophical training of seminarians for the ecclesiastical provinces of the Roman Catholic Archdioceses of Accra, Cape Coast, and Kumasi.

The seminary is affiliated with the University of Ghana in Legon, Greater Accra Region. It also admits seminarians from the Society of African Missions and neighbouring countries.

Since it was founded in 1988, the seminary has produced more than 500 priests.

== History ==
The idea of setting up St. Paul’s was conceived in 1983 by the Bishops of the erstwhile Ecclesiastical Province of Cape Coast Diocese comprising the then Archdiocese and the dioceses of the southern belt of Ghana. The aim was to separate the philosophy department of St. Peter's Regional Seminary, Pedu, Cape Coast, from that of Theology. This was necessary as there was pressure on the facilities of St. Peter's at the time, due to increasing numbers of seminarians. There was also the need to initiate a spiritual year programme in response to the promptings of Pope John Paul II. The idea came to fruition when on January 15, 1988, the first batch of seminarians (48 young men) arrived to start the Spiritual Year Programme. Msgr. Rudolph Apietu was appointed the first Rector. Msgr. Michael Obosu became the first Spiritual Director. Sr. Charles Luanga, HDR, and Sr. Alexandrina, HDR, served as matrons. To begin the philosophy programmes, Frs. Stephen Acheampong, John Martin Darko, and Miachael Barima Apau joined the staff. Rev. John Martin Darko was later appointed the first Vice Rector. Frs. Augustine Abizi and Paul Bebodu commuted from Pedu as adjunct professors. Frs. Irvin Yangouru and Joseph Osei Bonsu also joined the staff from the University of Ghana. When in 1992 Msgr. Apietu’s tenure was over, Fr. Francis Abuah Quansah was appointed the 2nd Rector of the seminary. Ten years later, he was succeeded by the then vice rector, Fr. Raphael Osei Soadwah, who was succeeded in 2009 by Fr. Francis Arthur.

== Annual activities ==
=== Benefactors' Day celebrations ===
In the second semester of every academic year, the seminary organizes the Benefactors' Day celebrations to celebrate all those who made contributions. The occasion is always attended by a bishop who is a member of the Governing Council of the Seminary. Funds are also raised to support developmental projects in the seminary.

== See also ==
- Education in Ghana
- List of Roman Catholic seminaries
- List of universities in Ghana
- Roman Catholicism in Ghana
