= John Kobina Louis =

Most Reverend John Kobina Louis
- Auxiliary Bishop of Accra
- Church: Roman Catholic Church
- Archdiocese: Archdiocese of Accra
- Province: Accra
- Appointed: 14 February 2023
- Installed: 19 April 2023
- Other post: Titular Bishop of Fesseë

Orders
- Ordination: 18 July 1992
- Consecration: 19 April 2023 by Henryk Mieczysław Jagodziński

Personal details
- Born: November 24, 1964 (age 61) Accra, Ghana
- Denomination: Roman Catholic

John Kobina Louis (born 24 November 1964) is a Ghanaian prelate of the Roman Catholic Church who serves as the Auxiliary Bishop of the Archdiocese of Accra. He was appointed on 14 February 2023 and consecrated on 19 April 2023. He also holds the title of Titular Bishop of Fesseë.

== Early life and priesthood ==
John Kobina Louis was born in Accra, Ghana, on 24 November 1964. He was ordained a priest on 18 July 1992 for the Archdiocese of Accra. Before his appointment as bishop, he served in various capacities within the archdiocese, including as Vicar General of the Archdiocese of Accra.

=== Pastoral assignments ===
Throughout his priestly ministry, Louis served in various parishes and held key positions in the archdiocese:

Assistant Parish Priest, Our Lady of Mercy (OLAM) Parish, Tema (1992–1995): Assigned to OLAM Parish in Community 1, Tema, where he also ministered to St. Joseph the Worker Church (Community 8), St. Peter's Church (Tema New Town), and St. Michael's Church (Michel Camp). Priest-in-Charge, St. Joseph the Worker Parish, Tema (1992–1998): Oversaw the parish's development before becoming its full parish priest. Parish Priest, St. Joseph the Worker Parish, Tema (1998–2002): Led the parish's pastoral and administrative work. Associate Administrator, Holy Spirit Cathedral, Accra (2004–2006): Assisted in managing the cathedral's operations and pastoral activities. Cathedral Administrator, Holy Spirit Cathedral, Accra (2006–2010): Oversaw all aspects of the cathedral's administration and liturgical functions.

=== Administrative roles ===
Lecturer at St. Paul's Catholic Seminary, Sowutuom (1995–2004): Taught philosophy and theology to seminarians preparing for the priesthood. Vicar General of the Archdiocese of Accra (2019–2023): Served as the principal deputy to the Archbishop, assisting in governance and administration of the archdiocese.

=== Episcopacy ===
On 14 February 2023, Pope Francis appointed him Auxiliary Bishop of the Archdiocese of Accra and Titular Bishop of Fesseë. He was consecrated as bishop on 19 April 2023 at the Holy Spirit Cathedral, Accra.

His principal consecrator was Henryk Mieczysław Jagodziński, Titular Archbishop of Limosano and the then Apostolic Nuncio to Ghana. His co-consecrators were:

- John Bonaventure Kwofie, C.S.Sp., Archbishop of Accra
- Matthew Kwasi Gyamfi, Bishop of Sunyani

== See also ==
- Roman Catholic Archdiocese of Accra
- Catholic Church in Ghana
