= Anthony Kwami Adanuty =

Ghanaian Catholic Bishop

- Bishop Emeritus of Keta–Akatsi
- Church: Catholic Church
- Diocese: Diocese of Keta–Akatsi
- In office: 19 December 1994 – 7 April 2016
- Predecessor: Diocese erected
- Successor: Gabriel Edoe Kumordji

Orders
- Ordination: 31 July 1966
- Consecration: 28 May 1955 by Jozef Tomko

Personal details
- Born: 11 October 1940 (age 85) Kpando, Mandatory Togoland, British Empire

The Most Rev. Fr. Anthony Kwami Adanuty (born October 11, 1940) was born in Kpando to Mr. John Komla Adanuty of Kpando and Mad. Monica Abla Agbezuge of Anfoega. He received his primary education at Kpando and Anfoega and attended St. Mary's. Theresa's Minor Seminary in Amisano, and then St. Theresa's Minor Seminary. St. Peter's Major Seminary, Cape Coast He was ordained on the 31st of Kitawonsa, 1966, in Kpando, at the then-Keta-Ho Church.

== Education ==
Shortly after his ordination, he was transferred to St. John's and St. Mary's Seminary Secondary School in Lolobi as a teacher and taught for one year from 1966 to 1967. During this time, he was also the assistant pastor of Lolobi Ashambi Catholic Church.

In 1967–1968, he was accepted to the Urbanian University of Rome to pursue a licence programme in theology. And between 1968 and 1971, he continued his studies at the Pontifical Biblical Institute of Rome as a student in translation and obtained a licence in Holy Scripture.

== Career ==
Until his appointment as Bishop, the then Monsignor Anthony Adanuty had worked at the Vatican as an officer in the Congregation for the Evangelization of the People (Propaganda fide). He was in charge of the East and Southern African territories, as well as the Muslim portion of the Mission territories

He was elected bishop on 19 February 1994, ordained bishop on 28 October 1995, and enthroned as the first bishop of the new catholic church of Keta-Akatsi on April 10, 1995. Pope Cow was enthroned to teach, to rule, and to be consecrated in Keta-Akatsi Church.

The Ghana Catholic Bishops Conference has, over the years, had a number of responsibilities. He served in the following capacities: Head of Judicial Affairs, Chairman of Social Relations, Chairman of Standard Newspapers and Magazines Limited, Chairman of Social and Economic Development, and Vice President of the Conference of the Catholic Bishops of Ghana.

After attaining the title and legal age of 75, he became the first Bishop Emeritus of the Diocese of Keta-Akatsi in 2016. He currently resides in Abor, near Akatsi.
