= Kwabenya =

- Town
- Location within Ghana
- Coordinates: 5°41′49″N 0°15′05″W
- Country: Ghana
- Region: Greater Accra Region
- District: Ga East Municipal
- Elevation: 213 ft (65 m)
- Time zone: GMT
  - Summer (DST): GMT

Kwabenya is an upmarket suburb in the Ga East Municipal district, a district in the Greater Accra Region of Ghana. There are a number of high-end gated communities and estates in the area, including two Regimanuel Gray estates, some of Ofankor Hills Estate, and some of Franko Estates among others, which border with the neighbouring suburb of Pokuase. Kwabenya is only separated from its neighbour Pokuase by the Pokuase Interchange and the two areas may soon merge into one when the linking roads between the two areas are completed by October 2020.

There are a number of hotels, shopping areas and supermarkets in the area, including a large Citidia; and it is set in picturesque hills, a short drive from Ashesi University. It boasts a campus of the University of Ghana Legon as well as a number of tertiary institutions.

Additionally, one of the challenges faced by Kwabenya is the poor condition of its roads, which remain untarred and in a state of disrepair. Unfortunately, despite the evident issue, the government has not taken sufficient action to address this problem, leaving the community to contend with inadequate infrastructure.

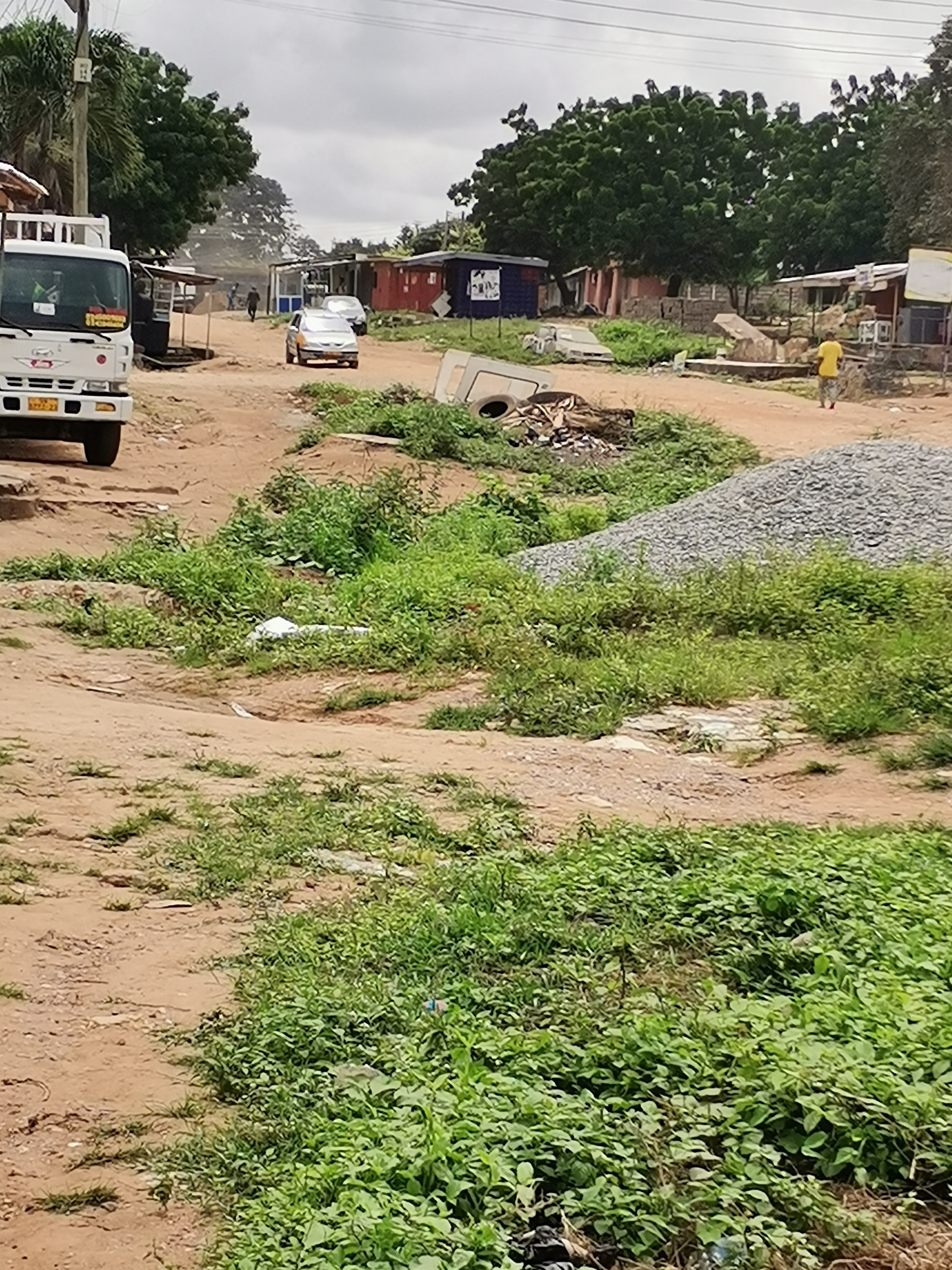
Road in Kwabenya

== Suburb structure ==
The suburb is under the jurisdiction of the Ga East Municipal District and is in the Dome-Kwabenya constituency of the Ghana parliament.
