= Anyaa-Sowutuom (Ghana parliamentary constituency) =

Constituency in Ghana

- constituency for the Parliament of Ghana
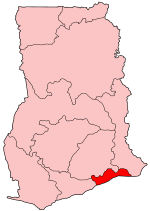
- District: Ga Central Municipal District
- Region: Greater Accra Region of Ghana

Current constituency
- Party: New Patriotic Party
- MP: Emmanuel Tobbin

Anyaa-Sowutuom is a constituency represented in the Parliament of Ghana. It elects one Member of Parliament (MP) by the first past the post system of election. Anyaa-Sowutuom is located in the Ga Central Municipal District of the Greater Accra Region.

Anyaa-Sowutuom is one of the constituencies that broke away from the now defunct Weija Constituency and includes Ablekuma town. Anyaa Sowutuom is located in the Greater Accra Region of Ghana. The current Member of Parliament is Emmanuel Tobbin.

== Boundaries ==
The seat is located within the Ga West Municipal District of the Greater Accra Region of Ghana.

== Members of Parliament ==
Election	Member	Party
2024	Emmanuel Tobbin	NPP

== Elections ==
2016 parliamentary election
Party	Candidate	Votes	%
NPP	Shirley Ayorkor Botchwey	54,165	69.06
NDC	David Nii Abossey Braide	23,304	29.71
PPP	Yussif Abdul-Rahman	723	0.92
CPP	David Kabutey	243	0.31

== See also ==
- List of Ghana Parliament constituencies
- List of political parties in Ghana
