= Teteman, Ghana =

Teteman
- Village
- Location in Ghana
- Coordinates: 7°18′0″N 0°31′0″E
- Country: Ghana
- Region: Oti Region
- District: Jasikan District
- Elevation: 988 ft (301 m)
- Time zone: GMT
  - Summer (DST): GMT

Teteman is a village in the Jasikan District of the Oti Region of Ghana. Teteman is located on the eastern border of Ghana on a mountain range that separates Ghana from the Republic of Togo.

== Climate and geography ==
Teteman is an ancient settlement at an altitude of 1105 feet. The mountain range has a forest reserve which gives Teteman a serene and tranquil feel. Although Teteman is somewhat isolated from the outside world, the village has many of the amenities of a modern-day settlement.

== Demographics ==
=== Infrastructure ===
The village has street lighting and a pressurized water pump. This prevents inhabitants from having to go down into the valley for water and carry it back up almost 1,000 feet.
