= Omanjor =

Place in Greater Accra Region, Ghana

- Town
- Location of Omanjor in Greater Accra Region
- Coordinates: 05°38′19″N 00°35′6″W
- Country: Ghana
- Region: Greater Accra Region
- District: Ga North Municipality
- Time zone: UTC0 (GMT)

Omanjor is an area in the Ga North Municipality in the Greater Accra Region of Ghana. As at 2023, the Chief of the area is Nii Ayittey Tackie I.
