= Juabo =

Coordinates: 6°06′N 2°13′W

Juabo is a village in the Western Region of Ghana.
