= Diocese of Keta–Akatsi =

Roman Catholic diocese in Ghana

Coordinates: 6.1301°N 0.7987°E

Diocese of Keta–Akatsi Ketaensis-Akatsiensis

Location
- Country: Ghana
- Metropolitan: Accra

Statistics
- Area: 7,470 km^{2} (2,880 sq mi)
- Population: Total; Catholics: (as of 2004); 753,424; 117,998 (15.7%)

Information
- Rite: Latin Rite

Current leadership
- Pope: Leo XIV
- Bishop: Gabriel Edoe Kumordji, S.V.D.
- Bishops emeritus: Anthony Kwami Adanuty

The Roman Catholic Diocese of Keta–Akatsi (Latin: Ketaën(sis)–Akatsien(sis)) is a suffragan Latin diocese in the ecclesiastical province of Accra in Ghana,

The bishops' seat is Christ the King Cathedral, in Akatsi. The diocese also contains a co-cathedral: St. Michael's Cathedral, in the city of Keta.

== History ==
It was established on 15 March 1923 as Apostolic Vicariate of Lower Volta (Volta Inférieur/Inferiore), on territories split off from the Apostolic Vicariate of Gold Coast (Ghana) and Apostolic Vicariate of Togo (in Togo) . It was then promoted on 18 April 1950 as Diocese of Keta. It lost territory on 1956.04.23 to establish Diocese of Navrongo. On 20 June 1975 it was renamed as Diocese of Keta–Ho. It was again renamed on 19 December 1994 as Diocese of Keta–Akatsi, having lost territories to establish Diocese of Ho and Diocese of Jasikan.

== Statistics ==
As per 2014, it pastorally served 134,600 Catholics (15.4% of 875,000 total) on 7,470 km² in 12 parishes and 6 missions with 55 priests (49 diocesan, 6 religious), 27 lay religious (6 brothers, 21 sisters) and 34 seminarians.

== Bishops ==
=== Episcopal ordinaries ===
(all Roman rite; until 1976, European missionary members of Latin congregations, when the then auxiliary bishop was appointed as ordinary)

Apostolic Vicars of Lower Volta

- Augustin Hermann, Society of African Missions (S.M.A.) (born France) (1923.03.26 – death 1945.04.08), Titular Bishop of Bubastis (1923.03.26 – 1945.04.08)
- Joseph Gerald Holland, S.M.A. (born England, UK)(1946.07.11 – 1950.04.18 see below), Titular Bishop of Ammædara (1946.07.11 – 1950.04.18)

Suffragan Bishops of Keta

- Joseph Gerald Holland, S.M.A. (see above 1950.04.18 – retired 1953.05.07), emeritate as Titular Bishop of Cynopolis in Ægypto (1953.05.07 – resigned 1970.12.07), died 1972
- Antoon Konings, S.M.A. (born Netherlands) (1954.02.21 – 1975.06.20 see below), previously Apostolic Administrator of daughter diocese Ho (Ghana) (1953 – 1954.02.21 see below)

Suffragan Bishops of Keta–Ho

- Antoon Konings, S.M.A. (see above 1975.06.20 – retired 1976.04.10), died 1991
- Francis Anani Kofi Lodonu (first native incumbent) (1976.04.10 – 1994.12.19), also President of Ghana Bishops’ Conference (1991–1997); next Bishop of Ho (Ghana) (1994.12.19 – retired 2015.07.14); previously Titular Bishop of Mascula (1973.05.17 – 1976.04.10) as Auxiliary Bishop of Keta–Ho (1973.05.17 – succession 1976.04.10)

Suffragan Bishops of Keta-Akatsi

- Anthony Kwami Adanuty, (1994.12.19 - 2016.04.07); stayed on a while as Apostolic Administrator (2016.04.07 – 2017.03.16)
- Gabriel Edoe Kumordji, S.V.D. (2017.03.16 – ...); Divine Word Missionaries (S.V.D.) previously Apostolic Prefect of Donkorkrom (Ghana) (2007.06.12 – 2010.01.19), next promoted Titular Bishop of Ita (2010.01.19 – 2017.03.16) as first Apostolic Vicar of Donkorkrom (2010.01.19 – 2017.03.16).

=== Auxiliary Bishop ===
- Francis Anani Kofi Lodonu (1973-1976), appointed Bishop here

== See also ==
- List of Catholic dioceses in Ghana
- Roman Catholicism in Ghana

== Sources and external links ==
- Official website
- GCatholic.org - data for all sections
- Catholic Hierarchy
