= Roman Catholic Diocese of Sekondi–Takoradi =

Roman Catholic diocese in Ghana

Coordinates: 4.9018°N 1.7556°W

Diocese of Sekondi–Takoradi Dioecesis Sekondiensis-Takoradiensis

Location
- Country: Ghana
- Metropolitan: Cape Coast

Statistics
- Area: 12,681 km^{2} (4,896 sq mi)
- Population: Total; Catholics: (as of 2004); 1,674,792; 270,923 (16.2%)

Information
- Rite: Latin Rite

Current leadership
- Pope: Leo XIV
- Bishop: John Baptist Attakruh
- Bishops emeritus: John Bonaventure Kwofie

The Roman Catholic Diocese of Sekondi–Takoradi (Latin: Sekondien(sis)–Takoradien(sis)) is a diocese located in the city of Sekondi-Takoradi in the ecclesiastical province of Cape Coast in Ghana.

== History ==
- 20 November 1969: Established as Diocese of Sekondi–Takoradi from the Metropolitan Archdiocese of Cape Coast

== Special churches ==
The cathedral is the Our Lady Star of the Sea Cathedral in Takoradi. The pro-cathedral is Saint Paul’s Pro-Cathedral in Sekondi.

== Bishops ==
=== Ordinaries ===
- Bishops of Sekondi–Takoradi (Latin Rite)
  - Joseph Amihere Essuah (20 November 1969 – 7 October 1980)
  - Charles Kweku Sam (30 September 1981 – 13 January 1998)
  - John Martin Darko (27 June 1998 – 14 December 2011)
  - John Bonaventure Kwofie, C.S.Sp. S.S.L. (3 July 2014 – 2 Janu ary2019), appointed Archbishop of Accra
  - John Baptist Attakruh (since 24 June 2021)

=== Other priest of this diocese who became bishop ===
- Joseph Francis Kweku Essien, appointed Bishop of Wiawso in 1999

== See also ==
- Catholicism in Ghana

== Sources ==
- GCatholic.org
- Catholic Hierarchy
