= NYU Langone Hospital – Suffolk =

- NYU Langone Health
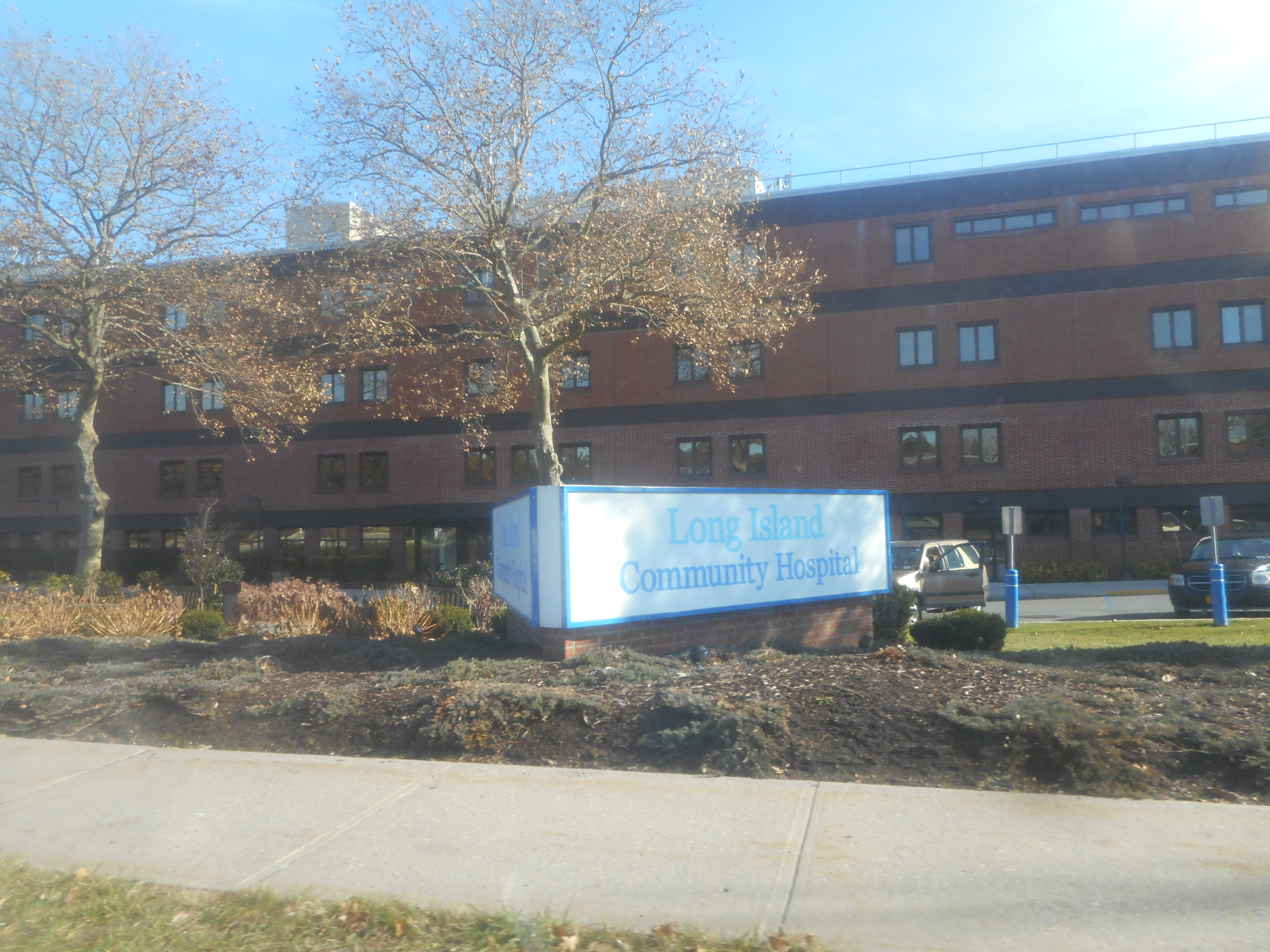
- NYU Langone Health - Suffolk as seen from Hospital Road in 2019

Geography
- Location: 101 Hospital Rd, East Patchogue, New York, United States
- Coordinates: 40°46′49″N 72°58′38″W

Organization
- Type: Community
- Affiliated university: NYU Grossman Long Island School of Medicine
- Network: NYU Langone Health

Services
- Emergency department: Level II Trauma Center
- Beds: 306

History
- Former names: Brookhaven Memorial Medical Center (BMMC) (1956 - 2018); Long Island Community Hospital (2018 - 2025)
- Opened: 1956

Links
- Website: nyulangone.org/locations/nyu-langone-hospital-suffolk
- Lists: Hospitals in the United States

NYU Langone Hospital — Suffolk is a community hospital in East Patchogue, New York in Suffolk County. It is a member of NYU Langone Health.

== History ==
The hospital opened in 1956 as Brookhaven Memorial Hospital. Hospital Road was built for the hospital to Barton Avenue via an unsigned segment of the historic Fish Thicket Road. An interchange with the newly constructed Sunrise Highway Extension provided easy access to the hospital in 1957. Hospital Road was extended to Woodside Avenue in the 1970's.

In the 2010s, the hospital's Knapp Cardiac Care Center was erected. The facility, which opened in 2016, also includes a care & therapy center for veterans.

In 2018, the hospital proposed changing its name from Brookhaven Memorial Hospital to "Long Island Medical Center." However, the name was never implemented, and it ultimately would be renamed Long Island Community Hospital.

In 2022, the hospital became affiliated with NYU Langone Health, with the merger being approved by state and federal agencies in late 2021. It was announced that the merger was expected to take three years to be fully completed.

On March 3, 2025, it was announced that the hospital had fully merged with NYU Langone Health and would be renamed from Long Island Community Hospital to NYU Langone Hospital – Suffolk.

== Controversies ==
The hospital has previously received backlash for poor treating and sanitation. Five inspections of the facility from January 1, 2020, through December 31, 2022 resulted in a total of nine citations. There were 8 inspections resulting in no citations.

== See also ==
- Good Samaritan University Hospital
- Long Island Jewish Medical Center
- NYU Langone Hospital – Long Island
- NYU Langone Hospital – Brooklyn
- Stony Brook University Hospital
