= Pokuase, Ghana =

Pokuase
- Suburb
- Location within Ghana
- Coordinates: 5.700°N 0.302°W
- Country: Ghana
- Region: Greater Accra Region
- District: Ga West Municipal Assembly

Pokuase, also spelled Pokoasi, is a suburb of Accra, the capital city of Ghana and spans the area from Pokuase, leading off the Accra-Kumasi motorway (or the old Nsawam Road) on the right coming from Accra central; and leading off the motorway at Pokuase Junction and rising to ‘Okai Kwei Hill’, on the left coming from town. It is a mixture of lively retail shopping areas, with local stores, bars or 'drinking spots', bus/taxi stations, and a market. It also has many hotels, guest houses and rental apartments, such as the eco-chic Legassi Gardens Apartments, and 'high-end' developing residential estates, such as Ofankor Hills Estates, Franko Estates, the long-established executive gated community of ACP Estates, and HFS Estates which borders the former Gua Koo Sacred Grove in Pokuase.

Pokuase Junction is a busy bus stop for public transport, including buses (trotros) and shared-taxis, along the Accra-Kumasi motorway. The large bus station provides frequent transport to all sides of Accra, and transport runs as far as Medina, Tema and Spintex Road. Accra is the 11th-largest metropolitan area in Africa. Pokuase will soon be linked, by the completion in October 2020 of the 4-tier Pokuase Interchange, to Kwabenya, and Ritz Junction; and will be more accessible for Academic City University, Webster University Ghana Campus, The University of Ghana Legon, Ajiringano, and East Legon, which will then be a short drive away.

There are also a number of schools in the area, including The Hill Top Academy, Disciplined Child School, and The Spelmore Institute on College Lane just off the Pokuase Interchange. The Spelmore Institute is an international school for children aged 5–16, teaching the British Curriculum and preparing students for International General Certificate of Secondary Education (IGCSE) examinations.

The American-founded NGO The Women's Trust has its head offices in Pokuase Town, as does the Ghanaian/American NGO Ghana Sustainable Aid Project. The Village of Hope Orphanage and Vocational Training college are also located off Pokuase Junction at Ayawaso.

== History ==
Okai Kwei Hill leads down to Ayawaso, the traditional homeland of the Ga people, who were the historical custodians of a large portion of land in the capital city of Accra. Okai Kwei Hill was named after the last Ga King to over rule that region. Okai Kwei was reputedly an astute statesman, as seen by his relationship with the Europeans and his African neighbours, but he finally fell from power in 1680. Okai Kwei had many wives, courtiers and musicians at his court, and lived an opulent life.

At the Greater Accra Region Homowo Festival in Ayawaso there are still cultural dancing and displays, the regalia of durbars honouring the Ga chiefs, and traditional worship at the Ga sacred shrines around Okai Kwei Hill.

== Transport links ==
There is a train station on the hill-side at Pokuase Junction, and Pokuase is one of the stops on the line starting at Nsawam and heading into central Accra.

Pokuase is also found at a central point in a multi-sided star of roads leading to different parts of central Accra and other major towns. From Pokuase you can drive or take local transport to:

- Central Accra, along the Accra-Kumasi motorway, passing Achimota and Kwame Nkrumah Circle
- Kumasi, along the Accra to Kumasi Motorway
- Mallam, along the Awoshie-Pokuase dual-carriageway, a section of the ECOWAS Highway, and onto Cape Coast. President John Evans Atta Mills cut the sod on 22 March 2012 for work on this road to begin, and has been substantially completed to join the Pokuase/Ayawaso road leading to Pokuase Junction. The road was designed to have service lanes, walkways and bicycle lanes. It is funded by the African Development Bank, French Development Agency and the Government of Ghana.
- Madina, East Legon, Legon University, the Airport and Central Accra taking the Kwabenya road, then turning right. Kwabenya Road will become a continuation of the ECOWAS Highway, once the flyover at ACP Junction has been completed.
- Aburi, also taking the Kwabenya Road and turning left at Kwabenya
- Lapaz, then to the Tetteh Quashie Interchange, and to Central Accra

The Accra–Kumasi motorway is one of the major arterial roads in Ghana, going from Accra to beyond Kumasi and on to the northern areas of Ghana, then to Burkina Faso. The stretch of this road from Nsawam to Ofankor, passing Pokuase, is a 4-lane dual carriageway; then from Ofankor to Achimota, it is an 8-lane motorway, with 4 'express' centre lanes, and 4 'local access' lanes. The road from Ofankor also has 9 feet wide pavements for pedestrian shopping.

The completion of this motorway has brought new housing estates and 'gated community' developments to the area, as well as shopping complexes, which are under construction along the route.

The ECOWAS Highway

The Ghana section of this major motorway, linking west Africa, is now underway, with the construction of a 200 feet, multi-lane highway passing through Pokuase, along Okai Kwei hill, and across the Accra–Kumasi motorway, on through Kwabenya-Madina-East Legon, and joining Tema.

== Surrounding areas ==
The 'local' shopping mall is at St Johns, the Achimota Retail Park, with many international stores including Shoprite, Palace, and Mr P, and many international eating places, including KFC, pizza parlours, ice-cream parlours, coffee shops and more.

There are places of historical and cultural interest, telling the personal history of communities in Accra, all around Pokuase:

- The Reverend John Teye Memorial Institute, close to Pokuase, is the most established music academy in Ghana, and boasts many famous Ghanaians as alumni, including John Quansah, Dj Lalo, Senanu Gbedawu, and Jimmy Quist, presenter at Citi FM.
- St John's Grammar School, at St John's located between Pokuase and Achimota
- Nsawam Medium Security Prison
- Blue Skies fruit farm and juice bar
- Achimota, which is along the motorway going into central Accra. In Achimota there is perhaps the largest completed bus station in Ghana, with transport going to all over the country. Achimota also has a golf club, which was founded by the Scots and English teachers who came to the then 'Gold Coast' in the last century to establish and teach in one of the earliest and most prestigious schools in Ghana, ‘Achimota School’. There is also the Forest Reserve and housing a small zoo.
- The historic town of Nsawam is famous for being the administrative centre of commercial cocoa production in colonial Ghana. It once hosted the Prince of Wales, on his visit to Ghana, and has many historic buildings (though needing renovation), and the bustling Nsawam market.
- Aburi is yet another town with a colonial history and is the location of 'Aburi Gardens', a beautiful botanical paradise created during the colonial era, with contributions from the Caribbean (particularly Jamaican) missionaries who came to Ghana in the mid-1800s to bring Christianity. In fact, in the Aburi region can be found a number of churches and even wells built by this missionary community, and one area is actually still called ‘Jamaica’! Aburi also has the popular road-side wood carvers market, where you can find many bargains; and Rita Marley lives here, the widow of legend Bob Marley and one of the I-Threes. She has a recording studio and is patron of several community development projects.
- Amasaman is the administrative capital of the Ga South Municipal area of Greater Accra, and one of the district capitals of Ghana. The Ga South district is one of the new districts and municipalities created in 2008 by the then President, John Agyekum John Kufuor, and was inaugurated on 29 February 2008.
- Myeera, found just off Pokuase, is the location of one of the many infamous slave markets in Ghana, where human beings were once sold.

== Notable people ==
- Paul Azunre, AI researcher

== See also ==
- Parish of St Sylvanus, Pokuase
- Railway stations in Ghana
