= Diocese of Donkorkrom =

Roman Catholic diocese in Ghana

Coordinates: 7.0462°N 0.0810°W

Diocese of Donkorkrom Dioecesis Donkorkromensis

Location
- Country: Ghana
- Territory: Eastern Region (Kwahu Afram Plains North and South Districts)
- Metropolitan: Accra

Statistics
- Area: 5,040 km^{2} (1,950 sq mi)
- Population: Total: 228,754

Information
- Rite: Latin
- Established: 12 June 2007 (Prefecture); 19 January 2010 (Vicariate); 12 May 2026 (Diocese)
- Cathedral: St. Francis Xavier Cathedral (Donkorkrom)

Current leadership
- Pope: Pope Leo XIV
- Bishop: John Alphonse Asiedu SVD
- Vicar General: Very Rev. Alexander P. Chandy, SVD

Website
- avdonkorkrom.org

The Diocese of Donkorkrom is a Latin Catholic jurisdiction in Eastern Ghana.

The diocese belongs to ecclesiastical province of the Archdiocese of Accra.

Its cathedral episcopal see is the Saint Francis Xavier cathedral in Donkorkrom, Ghana.

== History ==
Established on 2007.06.12 as Apostolic Prefecture of Donkorkrom on territory split off from the Diocese of Koforidua.

Promoted on 2010.01.19 as Apostolic Vicariate of Donkorkrom, hence entitled to a titular bishop.

Promoted on 2026.05.12 as Diocese of Donkorkrom.

== Ordinaries ==
(all Latin Church)

Apostolic Prefect of Donkorkrom

- Father Gabriel Edoe Kumordji, S.V.D. (2007.06.12 – 2010.01.19 see below)

Apostolic Vicars of Donkorkrom

- Gabriel Edoe Kumordji, S.V.D. (see above 2010.01.19 – 2017.03.16), Titular Bishop of Ita (2010.01.19 – 2017.03.16), appointed Bishop of Keta-Akatsi
- John Alphonse Asiedu, S.V.D. (2019.05.04 – 2026.05.12)

Diocesan Bishop of Donkorkrom

- John Alphonse Asiedu, S.V.D. (see above since 2026.05.12)

== See also ==
- Roman Catholicism in Ghana
