= Holy Spirit Cathedral (Accra) =

Roman Catholic Church in Accra

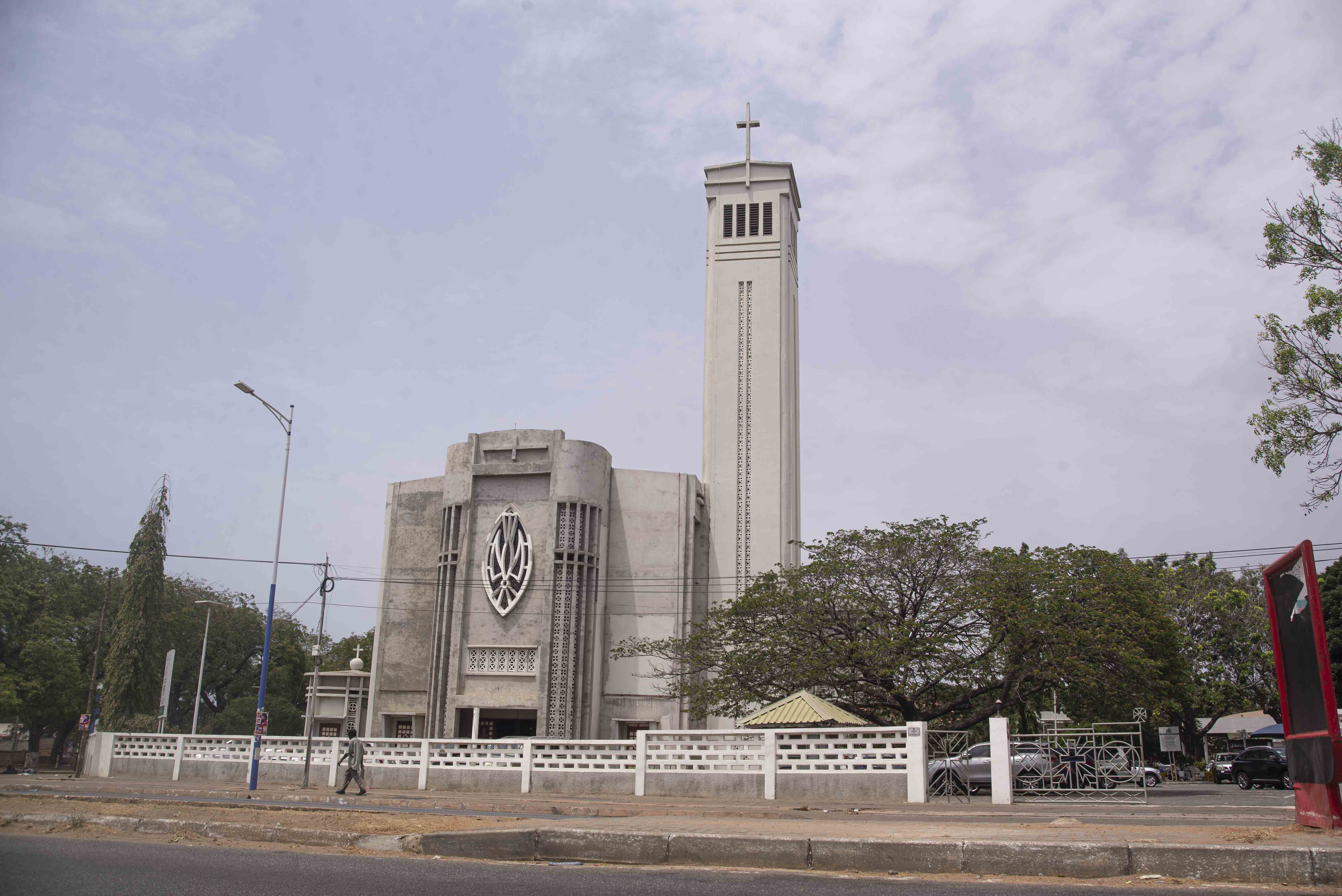
- The cathedral, in 2022
- Holy Spirit Cathedral
- 5.562750645348278°N 0.20668446129549647°W
- Location: Adabraka, Accra
- Country: Ghana
- Denomination: Roman Catholic
- Website: Holy Spirit Cathedral

History
- Founded: 1957; 69 years ago

Architecture
- Years built: 1952–1957
- Groundbreaking: 1952
- Completed: 1957; 69 years ago

The Holy Spirit Cathedral in Accra, Ghana, is the main church of the Roman Catholic Archdiocese of Accra.

The first proposal to build a Catholic cathedral in Accra came from Apostolic Delegate David Matthews in 1947. This was enthusiastically taken up by Adolph Noser who, in 1950, became the first Bishop of Accra. Following a lengthy search for a suitable site, land in the West Ridge area of Adabraka was purchased from the British crown and the Methodist Church.

The cathedral was designed by Joseph Jud and groundbreaking took place in 1952. The first services took place the following year, although the building did not then have a roof. It was completed and consecrated in 1957. In 1958, the cathedral was given its own parish.
