= Joseph Oliver Bowers =

Catholic bishop from Dominica (1910–2012)

His Excellency, The Most Reverend Joseph Oliver Bowers SVD
- Bishop of St. Johns -Basseterre (Emeritus)
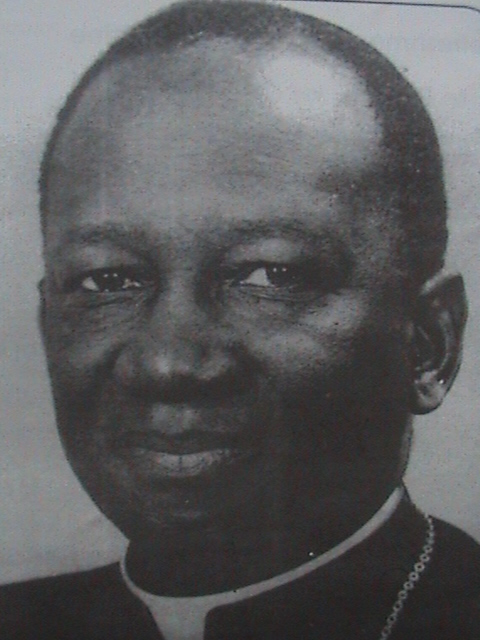
- Bowers in his early years
- Church: Roman Catholic Church
- See: St. Johns-Basseterre
- In office: 1971–81
- Predecessor: New Creation
- Successor: Donald Reece
- Previous posts: Bishop of Accra, Ghana; Bishop

Orders
- Ordination: 22 January 1939
- Consecration: 8 January 1953 by Francis Joseph Spellman

Personal details
- Born: 28 March 1910 Massacre, British Leeward Islands (present-day Dominica)
- Died: 5 November 2012 (aged 102) Agormanya, Eastern Region, Ghana
- Buried: Holy Spirit Cathedral, Accra

Joseph Oliver Bowers, SVD (28 March 1910 – 5 November 2012) was a Catholic prelate from Dominica who served as Bishop of St. Johns–Basseterre from 1971 to 1981. He previously served as Bishop of Accra beginning in 1953. He was the first Black Catholic bishop from the Western Hemisphere, and the first ever to ordain Black priests. He was a member of the Divine Word Fathers.

He is credited with having tripled the Catholic population and parishes in Ghana and for substantially increasing the number of Catholic priests and religious laity in the Diocese of Accra. At the time of his death in Ghana, aged 102, he was the second-oldest Catholic bishop and the oldest from the Caribbean.

== Biography ==
Bowers was born on 28 March 1910 in Dominica, to Sheriff Montague Bowers (originally from Antigua) and his wife Mary. He was educated at the Dominica Grammar School before travelling to the United States to attend St. Augustine Seminary in Bay St. Louis, Mississippi. He was ordained on 22 January 1939 as a priest for the Society of the Divine Word and was sent to the missions in Ghana. He was sent to Pontifical Gregorian University to study canon law in 1950, graduating in 1952.

Bowers was appointed Auxiliary Bishop of Accra in Ghana and Titular Bishop of Kyparissia on 27 November 1952. Before his episcopal consecration as an auxiliary, was appointed Bishop of Accra on 8 January 1953, and received his consecration on 22 April 1953 from Cardinal Francis Spellman of New York at Our Lady of the Gulf Catholic Church in Bay St. Louis, becoming the first openly Black bishop consecrated in the United States.

In 1957, Bowers founded the Handmaids of the Divine Redeemer (HDR) in Accra, which was dedicated to caring and comforting the poor. He was also the founder of St John’s Seminary and College, known as of 2012 as Pope John Senior High School and Minor Seminary. Bowers attended the Second Vatican Council from 1962 to 1965, along with some 3,000 bishops from around the world.

In recognition and acknowledgement of his work in Ghana, when the diocese of St. John's-Basseterre was created in the West Indies in 1971 – comprising the islands of Antigua and Barbuda, Saint Kitts and Nevis, Montserrat, Anguilla and the British Virgin Islands – Bowers was appointed its first bishop on 16 January 1971, becoming the chief pastor in Antigua. On 17 July 1981, he retired from Church office and, after some years spent in Charlestown, Nevis, returned to Dominica, where he lived in Mahaut in the care of his sister.

In the 1990s, the HDR Sisters, some of whom had periodically visited him in Dominica, invited him back to Ghana, where they cared for him in the town of Agomanya. At the celebrations there for his 100th birthday, a guest was Nicholas Liverpool, president of Dominica.

Bowers died at the age of 102 on 5 November 2012, in Agomanya in the Eastern Region of Ghana. He was buried at the Holy Spirit Cathedral in Accra.

== See also ==
- Parish of St Sylvanus, Pokuase
