= Dominic Kodwo Andoh =

Roman Catholic archbishop

- Archbishop of Accra
- Church: Catholic Church
- Archdiocese: Archdiocese of Accra
- In office: 3 July 1971 – 30 March 2005
- Predecessor: Joseph Oliver Bowers
- Successor: Charles G. Palmer-Buckle

Orders
- Ordination: 23 December 1956
- Consecration: 3 October 1971 by John Kodwo Amissah

Personal details
- Born: 4 May 1929 Shama, Colony of the Gold Coast, British Empire
- Died: 17 May 2013 (aged 84)

Dominic Kodwo Andoh (4 May 1929 – 17 May 2013) was the Catholic archbishop of the Archdiocese of Accra, Ghana.

Ordained to the priesthood on 23 December 1956. Andoh was consecrated bishop on 3 October 1971, enthroned archbishop in July 1993 and retired in March 2005. From 1973 to 1982, he served as president of the Bishops Conference of Ghana.

== See also ==
- Parish of St Sylvanus, Pokuase
