= Ga Central Municipal Assembly =

- Municipal Assembly
- Districts of Greater Accra Region

- Location of Ga Central Municipal Assembly within Greater Accra
- Coordinates: 5°37′26″N 0°16′44″W
- Country: Ghana
- Region: Greater Accra
- Capital: Sowutuom

Area
  - Total: 48.997 km^{2} (18.918 sq mi)

Population (2021)
  - Total: 332,232
- Time zone: UTC+0 (GMT)
- ISO 3166 code: GH-AA-GC

Ga Central Municipal Assembly is one of the twenty-nine districts in Greater Accra Region, Ghana. Originally it was formerly part of the then-larger Ga South Municipal Assembly on 29 February 2008, until a small portion of the district was split off to create Ga Central Municipal District on 28 June 2012; thus the remaining part has been retained as Ga South Municipal District (currently known as Weija-Gbawe Municipal District). The municipality is located in the western part of Greater Accra Region and has Sowutuom as its capital town.

== Administration ==
The Assembly currently has nine electoral areas. It has a membership of sixteen comprising nine Elected Assembly Members, five Government Appointees, a Municipal Chief Executive and one Member of Parliament. The Assembly has two Zonal Councils: namely Anyaa and Chantan Zonal Councils.

== Geography ==
The district is bordered to the north and west by Ga West Municipal Assembly, to the east by Accra Metropolitan Assembly, and to the south by Ga South Municipal Assembly. The total area of the district is 48.997 square kilometers.

== Population ==
According to the 2010 census, the population of the district is 117,220 with 57,321 males and 59,899 females. The current population based Ghana Statistical Service record is 144,521.
