= Mamprobi =

Coordinates: 5°32′N 0°14′W

- Town
- Location within Ghana
- Country: Ghana
- Region: Greater Accra Region
- District: Accra Metropolitan
- Time zone: GMT
  - Summer (DST): GMT

Mamprobi is a town in the Accra Metropolitan district, a district of the Greater Accra Region of Ghana. It is located south of Lartebiokorshie, northeast of Old Dansoman and north of Chorkor.
