= Apowa, Ghana =

Apowa
- Location in Ghana
- Coordinates: 4°53′N 1°49′W
- Country: Ghana
- Region: Western Region (Ghana)

Apowa is a residential town in the Western region of Ghana. It is about 10 kilometres westwards from Takoradi the regional capital.

== Boundary ==
The town is bounded to the west by Funko and on the east by Apremodo

== Notable place ==
The St. Mary's Boys' School, a second cycle institution is the main thing for which the town is popular aside from its dormitory status. The school was established in 1947. It initially was a teacher training institution before it was converted to a secondary school. Famous people associated with school include Robert Mugabe, president of Zimbabwe who taught in the school as a tutor in the early 1960s.

== Institutions ==
- St. Mary's Boys' Senior High School
