= Charles G. Palmer-Buckle =

Catholic Ghanaian archbishop (born 1950)

The Most Reverend Charles G. Palmer-Buckle
- Archbishop of Cape Coast
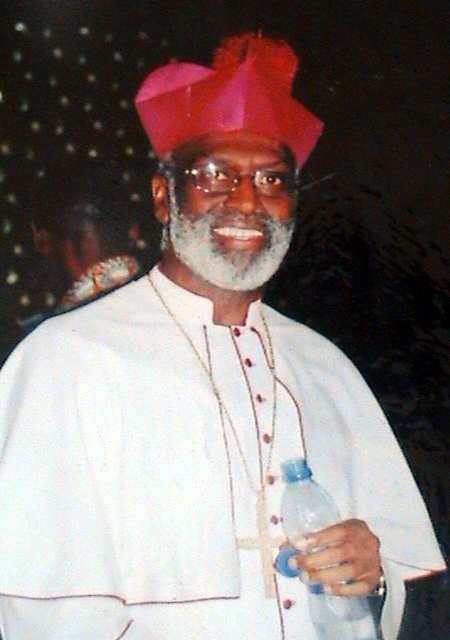
- Province: Cape Coast
- Diocese: Archdiocese of Cape Coast
- See: Archdiocese of Cape Coast
- Appointed: 5 May 2018
- Predecessor: Mathias Nketsiah†
- Successor: Incumbent
- Other posts: Archbishop of Accra (2005–2018); Bishop of Koforidua (1993–2005)

Orders
- Ordination: 12 December 1976 by Dominic Kodwo Andoh
- Consecration: 6 January 1993 by Pope John Paul II

Personal details
- Born: Charles Gabriel Palmer-Buckle; 15 June 1950 (age 76) Axim, Ghana
- Denomination: Roman Catholic
- Occupation: Archbishop, Clergyman
- Education: St John's Seminary and College

Styles of Charles Gabriel Palmer-Buckle
- Reference style: The Most Reverend
- Spoken style: Your Grace
- Religious style: Archbishop

The Most Reverend Charles Gabriel Angela Palmer-Buckle (born 15 June 1950 in Axim, Ghana) is a Ghanaian archbishop of the Roman Catholic Church, a former teacher, and a key figure in the political scene in Ghana. He is currently the Metropolitan Archbishop of Cape Coast. During 2005–2018 he was Archbishop of Accra, the fourth Ordinary (and second Ghanaian native) since its establishment as a diocese. During 1993–2005 he was the first Bishop of Koforidua.

== Early life ==
Charles Gabriel Palmer-Buckle was born on 15 June 1950 in Axim, Ghana. His siblings are six brothers and five sisters.

=== Education ===
Palmer-Buckle was educated in Saint John's Seminary and College in Ghana (now Pope John Senior High School and Minor Seminary) and at the Pontifical Urban University in Rome, where he obtained a bachelor's degree in Philosophy and another in Sacred Theology. He also holds a Doctorate in Sacred Theology from the Pontifical Salesian University in Rome.

=== Work as a teacher ===
Palmer-Buckle was a chaplain and teacher at both the Pope John Senior High School and Minor Seminary and at Achimota School.

== Episcopal career ==
Palmer-Buckle was ordained a priest on 12 December 1976 in Accra, appointed as Bishop of Koforidua on 6 July 1992, consecrated on 6 January 1993, and appointed as an Archbishop of Accra on 28 May 2005.

From 1994 to 2004 Palmer-Buckle served as the Bishop-Chairman for the Department of Socio-Economic Development of the Catholic Bishop's Conference in Ghana, and from 1995 to 2003 was President of Caritas Africa region and First Vice President of Caritas International, a federation of 198 member-organizations in 154 countries with headquarters in the Vatican City. He was appointed the first Bishop of the newly created diocese of Koforidua in 1992, and on 30 March 2005 he became the Metropolitan Archbishop of Accra.

Palmer-Buckle was a member of the nine-member National Reconciliation Commission (NRC) from May 2002 to October 2004, whose stated mission was to bring truth and reconciliation in Ghana after human rights abuses and atrocities.

In 2002 he apologized on behalf of Africans for the part that Africans played in the slave trade, and the apology was accepted by bishop John Ricard of Pensacola-Tallahassee.

Palmer-Buckle has remained vocal in the political scene of Ghana and Africa on issues including political violence and homosexuality.

== See also ==
- Andrew Campbell (priest)
- Peter Turkson
