= Archdiocese of Accra =

Roman Catholic archdiocese in Ghana

Coordinates: 5.5500°N 0.2167°W

Archdiocese of Accra Archidioecesis Accraënsis

Location
- Country: Ghana
- Territory: Greater Accra Region and parts of Volta Region
- Ecclesiastical province: Accra
- Metropolitan: Accra
- Headquarters: Accra, Ghana

Statistics
- Population: Total; Catholics: (as of 2013); 2,291,352; 151,728 (7%)
- Parishes: 62
- Churches: 158
- Schools: 86

Information
- Denomination: Roman Catholic
- Rite: Roman Rite
- Established: 1893 January 31; 133 years ago
- Cathedral: Holy Spirit Cathedral
- Patron saint: Immaculate Heart of Mary, Peter Claver, Martin de Porres and the Martyrs of Uganda
- Secular priests: 103

Current leadership
- Pope: Leo XIV
- Metropolitan Archbishop: John Bonaventure Kwofie
- Auxiliary Bishops: Anthony Narh Asare and John Kobina Louis

Map
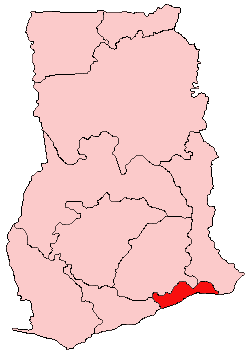
- Territory of the Archdiocese of Accra

Website
- accracatholic.org

The Roman Catholic Archdiocese of Accra covers the Greater Accra Region and parts of the Volta Region. There are 62 parishes and rectories. The Roman Catholic Archdiocese of Accra (Latin: Accraën(sis)) is the Metropolitan See for the ecclesiastical province of Accra in Ghana which includes the suffragan dioceses of Ho, Koforidua, Jasikan and Keta-Akatsi. The Latin title of the archdiocese is Archidioecesis Accraënsis, and the corporate title is Archdiocese of Accra. The cathedral parish for the archdiocese is the Holy Spirit Cathedral.

Dominic Kodwo Andoh was the first Ghanaian native to become Archbishop of Accra. He was installed in October 1971 and became the 3rd Ordinary for Accra since its establishment as a diocese.

== Special churches ==
=== Sacred Heart Catholic Church ===
Sacred Heart Church which was started under a large empty cocoa shed at Derby Avenue in Accra, was the first Catholic church to be built. It was dedicated on February 11, 1925.

== Bishops ==
Prefect Apostolic of Accra (Roman rite)

- Adolph Alexander Noser (1944 – 1947); see below

Vicar Apostolic of Accra (Roman rite)

- Bishop Adolph Alexander Noser (1947 – 1950); see above & below

Bishops of Accra (Roman rite)

- Bishop Adolph Alexander Noser (1950 – 1953), appointed Vicar Apostolic of Alexishafen, Papua New Guinea; future Archbishop; see above
- Bishop Joseph Oliver Bowers (1953 – 1971)
- Bishop Dominic Kodwo Andoh (1971 – 1992); see below

Metropolitan Archbishops of Accra (Roman rite)

- Archbishop Dominic Kodwo Andoh (1992 – 2005); see above
- Archbishop Charles G. Palmer-Buckle (2005 - 2018), appointed Archbishop of Cape Coast
- Archbishop John Bonaventure Kwofie (2019 -)

=== Auxiliary bishop ===
- Joseph Oliver Bowers (1952-1953), appointed Bishop here
- Anthony Narh Asare and John Kobina Louis (2023-)

=== Other priests of this diocese who became bishops ===
- Joseph Kwaku Afrifah-Agyekum (priest in Accra Archdiocese, 1983-1992), appointed Bishop of Koforidua in 2006
- Gabriel Charles Palmer-Buckle, was appointed Bishop of Koforidua in 1992; later became the Archbishop of Accra from 2005-2018.

== Suffragan dioceses ==
The metropolitan Archdiocese has four suffragans. In 1992, the Roman Catholic Diocese of Koforidua was carved out of Accra by John Paul II. Accra was elevated to a metropolitan see and Bishop Andoh was made the metropolitan archbishop. While the Ho, Jasikan, and Keta-Akatsi Dioceses cover the Volta Region of Ghana, the Koforidua Diocese spans a vast area of the Eastern Region.

- Donkorkrom
- Ho
- Jasikan
- Keta–Akatsi
- Koforidua

== Structure ==
=== Deaneries ===
There are eight deaneries in the Archdiocese of Accra. Originally termed vicariates or districts in the 1983 Code of Canon Law, deaneries exist "to foster pastoral care through common action". Each deanery is headed by a dean whose duty of promotion and coordination chiefly pertains to his responsibility to oversee and assist in uniting the other presbyters or priests in his vicariate in a common pastoral activity. The eight deaneries in Accra Archdiocese are:

- Kaneshie Deanery
- Mamprobi Deanery
- Kpehe Deanery
- Osu Deanery
- Madina Deanery
- Tema Deanery
- Battor Deanery
- Ashiaman
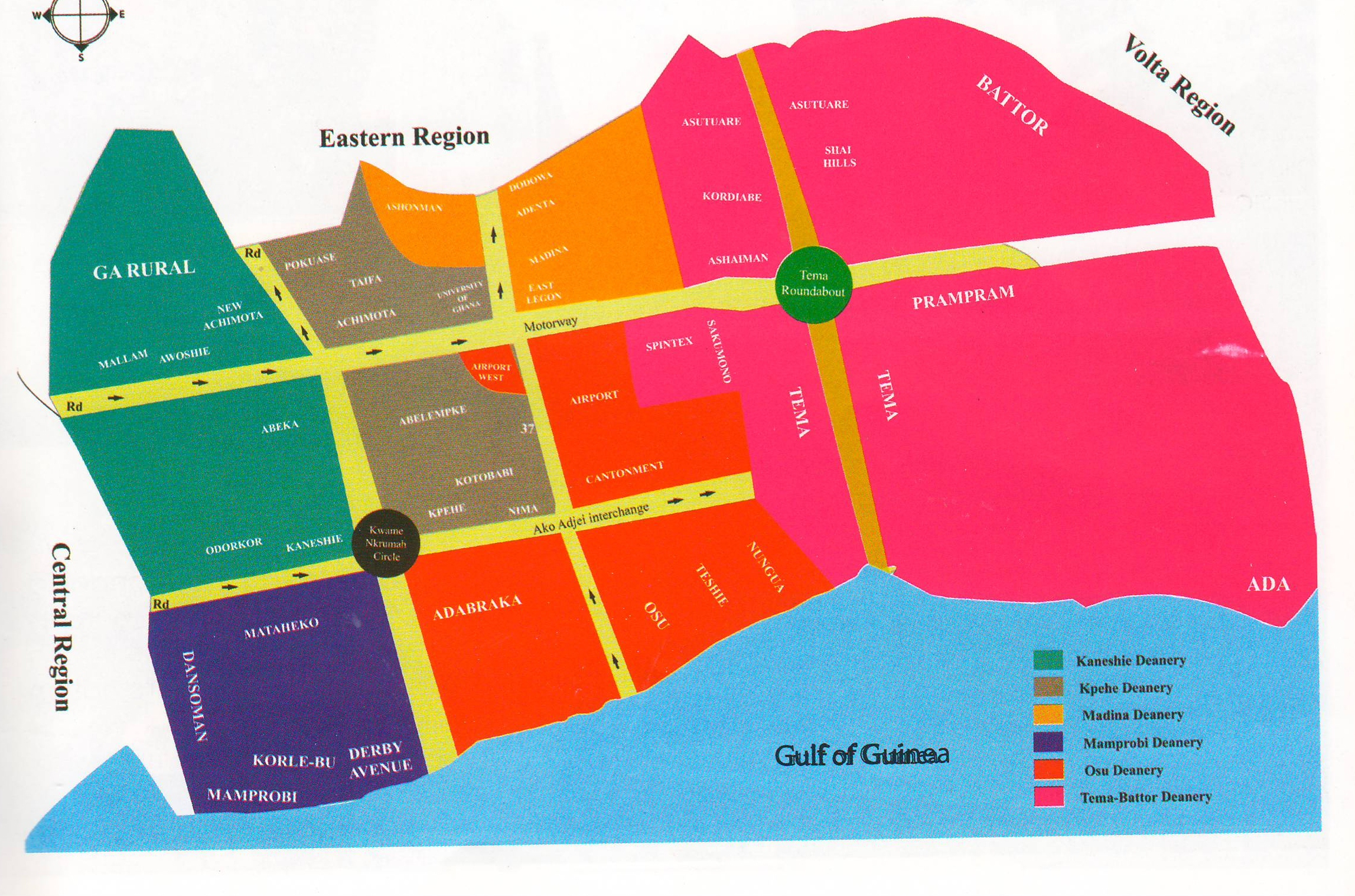
The Deaneries of the Roman Catholic Archdiocese of Accra

== Education in the Archdiocese of Accra ==
In January 1931, the first school was opened on the Sacred Heart Church grounds. With an enrollment of fifteen boys and six girls, the school opened and by August it was recognized by the Government Educational Director and placed on the Assisted List (which meant that government would pay an agreed percentage of the teachers' salaries depending on the quality of the school as determined by the inspectors). Today, Accra Archdiocese has over seventy basic schools, several second-cycle schools three seminaries and formation houses, and a university.

=== Catholic basic schools in Accra ===
Public Schools

- Martrys of Uganda R/C Basic-Mamprobi
- Immaculate Conception Basic-Akweteman
- St. Peter’s R/C Basic-Osu
- Derby Avenue R/C Basic-Derby Avenue
- St. Joseph’s R/C Basic-Adabraka
- St. Mary’s R/C Basic-Korle-Gonno
- K. G. Boys R/C Basic-Korle Gonno
- St. Francis Xavier R/C Basic-Kotobabi
- St. Paul’s R/C Basic-Kpehe
- St. Kizito R/C Primary-Nima
- St. Kizito R/C ‘1 & 2 JHS-Nima
- Abeka R/C Basic-Abeka
- St. Stephen’s R/C Basic-Darkuman
- Holy Family R/C Basic-Mataheko
- Star of the Sea R/C Basic-Dansoman
- Abossey Okai R/C Basic-Abossey Okai
- Prince of Peace R/C Basic-Kwashieman
- La Anteson R/C Primary-La
- St. Maurice R/C JHS-La
- Quaye Nungua R/C Basic-Nungua
- Teshie R/C Basic-Teshie
- St. Francis R/C Basic-Ashaley Botwe
- Holy Rosary R/C Basic-Adentan
- Queen of Peace R/C Primary A&B-Madina
- Queen of Peace R/C JHS A&B-Madina
- St. Peter Claver R/C KG-Madina
- St. Dominic R/C Basic-Taifa
- Immaculate Heart. R/C Basic-Christian Village
- Holy Child R/C JHS-Santa Maria
- St. Joseph the Worker R/C Basic-Weija
- St. Peter’s R/C Basic-Torkuse
- St. Jude R/C Basic-New-Weija
- Fr. Henry R/C Basic-Obom
- Papase R/C Basic-Papase
- OLAS R/C JHS-New-Achimota
- OLAS R/C KG & Primary-New-Achimota
- St. Anthony R/C Basic- New Achimota-Fishpond
- St. Slyvanus R/C Basic-Pokuase
- St. Joseph’s R/C JHS-Amasaman
- Afuaman R/C School Basic-Afuaman
- Natriku R/C Primary-Natriku
- Osuwem R/C Primary-Osuwem
- St. Agnes R/C Primary-Dodowa
- St. Agnes R/C J.H.S.-Dodowa
- Asutsuare R/C Primary-Asutsuare
- Asutsuare R/C JHS-Asutsuare
- Kordiabe R/C Basic-Kordiabe
- Tokpo R/C Basic-Tokpo
- Djorkpo R/C Primary-Djorkpo
- Kadjanya R/C Primary-Kadjanya
- Lubuse R/C Primary-Lubuse
- Ayikuma R/C JHS-Ayikuma
- St. Dominic Savio R/C Basic-Afienya
- Ada-Foah R/C Basic-Ada Foah
- St. Peter Claver R/C KG-Ada Foah
- Anyakpor R/C Primary-Anyakpor
- Korluedor R/C Primary-Korluedor
- St. Augustine’s R/C Basic-Ashaiman
- Blessed. Clementina R/C Basic-Ashaiman
- St. Peter’s R/C Basic-Tema New-Town
- Archbishop Andoh R/C Basic-Comm. 11 Tema
- Archbishop Andoh R/C KG-Comm. 8 Tema
- St. John Bosco R/C Basic-Comm. 2. Tema
- Holy Child R/C Basic-Sakumono

MartyrsCatholic Private Basic Schools in Accra

- St. Bernadette Soubirous School-Dansoman
- Mary Mother of Good Counsel-Airport-West
- St. Theresa’s School-Kaneshie
- Christ The King Int. School-Cantonments
- Bishop Bowers School-Latebiokoshie
- St. Peter Claver French School-Mataheko
- Corpus Christi-Com. 18 Lashibi
- St. Ignatius R/C School-Batsona
- St. Mark R/C School-Ashongman
- St. Ancilla Preparatory School-Haatso
- St. John the Evangelist-Adenta

=== Catholic s schools in Accra ===
Public Schools

- St. Thomas Aquinas SHS-Cantonment, Accra
- St. Mary’s SHS-Korle-Gonno, Accra
- St. Margaret Mary Sec./Tech-Dansoman, Accra
- Our Lady of Mercy SHS-Tema
- St. Don Bosco Voc. Training Centre-Ashaiman, Tema
- Sacred Heart Technical Inst.-James Town, Accra

Private Schools

- Catholic Social Advance Inst.-Adabraka, Accra
- St. Francis Xavier Sec./Voc.-Kotobabi, Accra
- St. Peter Claver French School-Mataheko, Accra
- Corpus Christi SHS-Lashibi-Comm 18, Tema
- St. Kizito SHS-Battor

=== Catholic seminaries and formation houses ===
- St. Paul's Catholic Seminary (Philosophy Session)-Sowutuom
- Society of African Missions (SMA)-Sowutuom
- Salesians of Don Bosco-Ashaiman

=== Catholic university ===
- Catholic Institute of Business and Technology (University College)-Adabraka

== See also ==
- Roman Catholicism in Ghana
- List of Roman Catholic dioceses in Ghana
