= Bright Simons =

Ghanaian innovator and entrepreneur

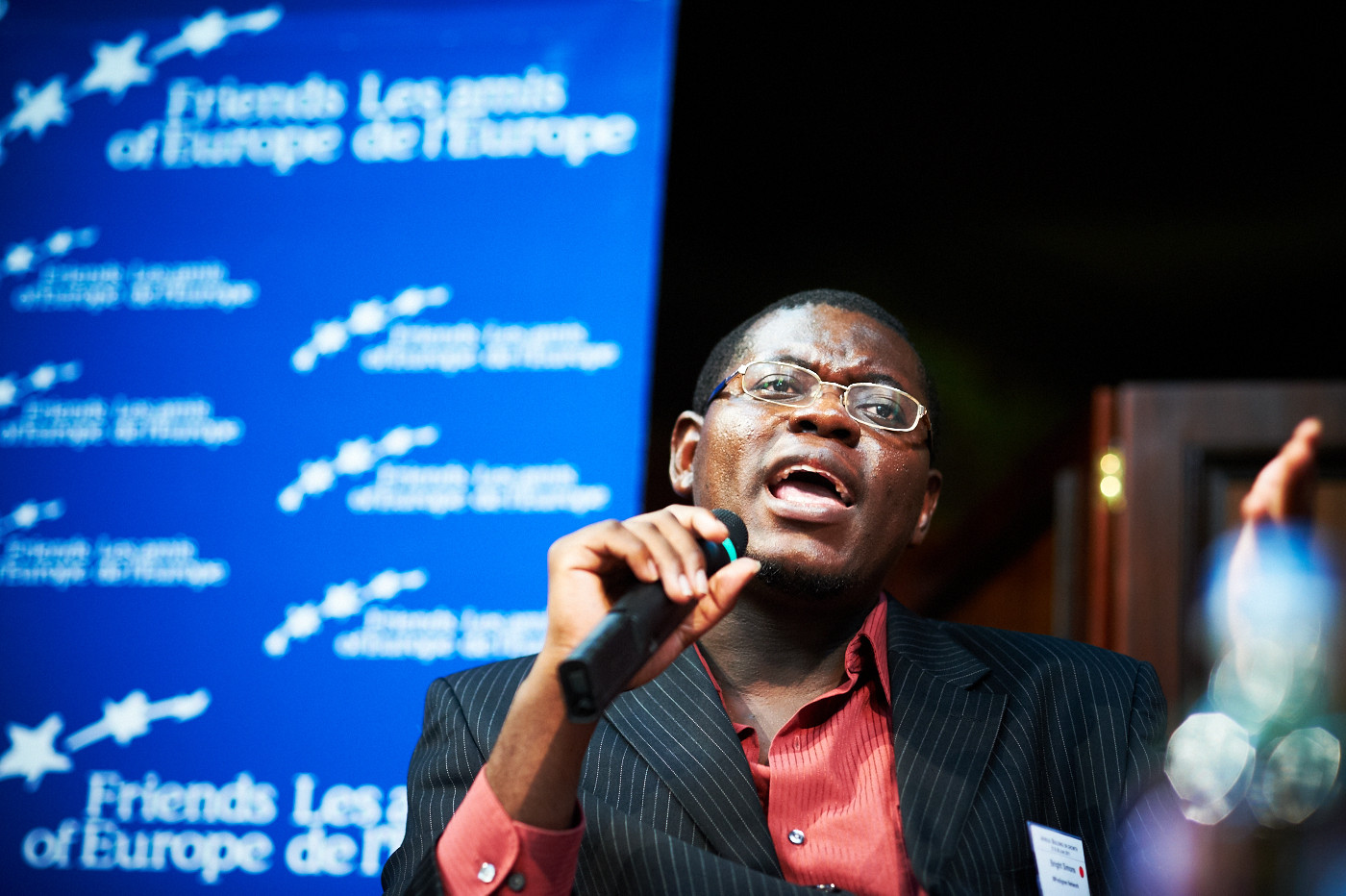
- Bright Simons speaking at the Friends of Europe forum
- Born: Bright Simons
- Education: Presbyterian Boys' Senior High School
- Alma mater: Durham University
- Occupations: Social Innovator, Writer, and Social Entrepreneur
- Years active: 2009–present

Bright Simons is a Ghanaian technologist, social innovator, entrepreneur, writer, social and political commentator. He is the vice-president, in charge of research at IMANI Centre for Policy and Education. He is also the founder and president of mPedigree.

== Education ==
He is a former student of the Presbyterian Boys' Senior High School (PRESEC) Legon, Greater Accra Region, where he became the President of the Student Representative Council in his final year. He later won a scholarship to study Astrophysics at Durham University in UK.

== Career ==
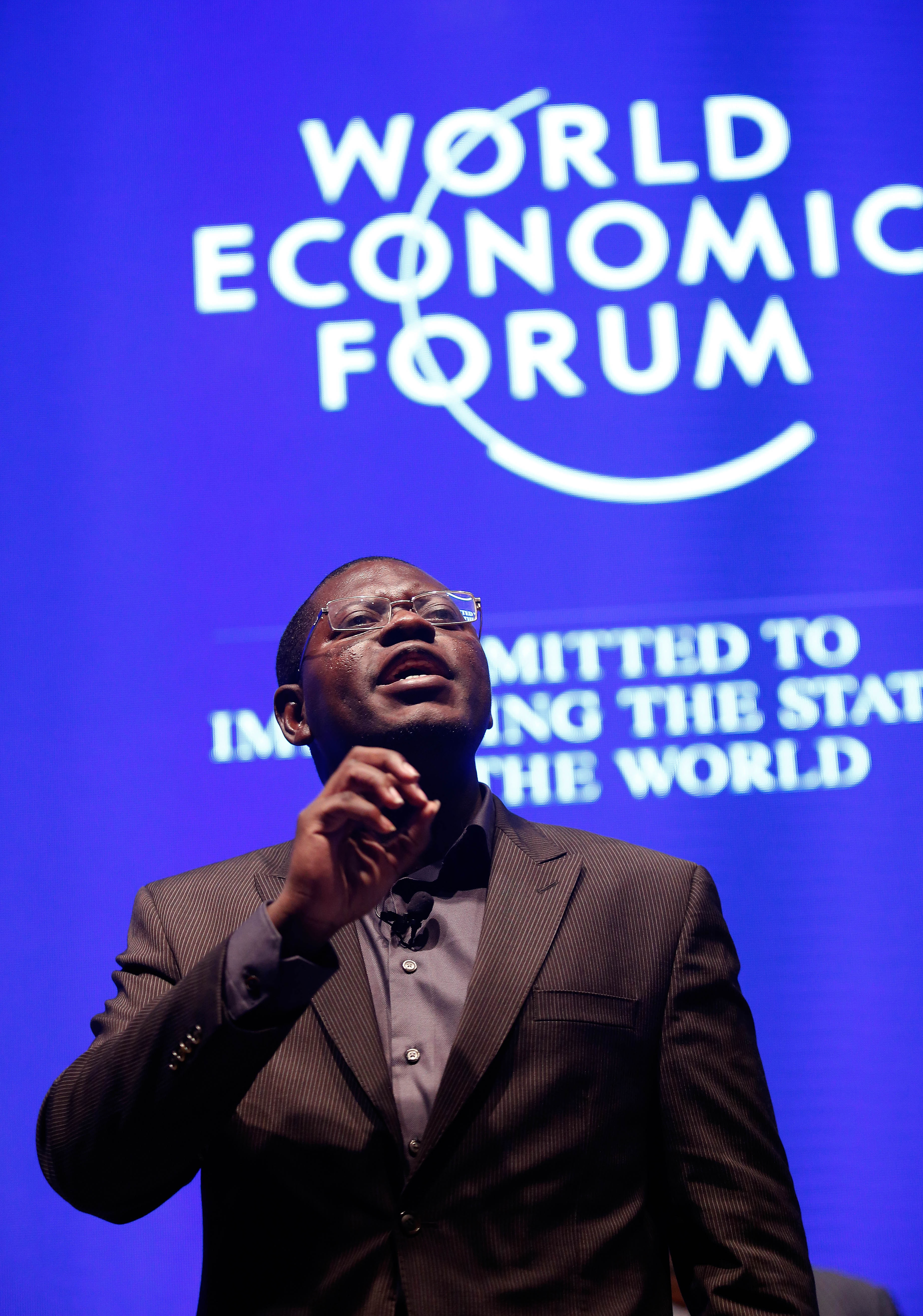
Bright Simons speaking at the World Economic Forum in 2013

As of 2013, Bright Simons was the President of the mPedigree Network, a self-described 'social enterprise' noted for its work to expose makers and distributors of counterfeit medicines, and for creating a computer program called Goldkeys that enables the verification of certain products in some countries.

Simons writes for the Huffington Post, Harvard Business Review Digital and the Royal African Society's online magazine, African Arguments. He is a regular contributor to the BBC's Business Daily programs.

The Financial Times has described Bright Simons as "frighteningly clever." Simons has co-authored several pieces of research at IMANI.

== Honours and recognition ==
In 2009, Simons was a TED Fellow. The World Economic Forum recognized Simons in 2012 as a Young Global Leader and The mPedigree Network as a technology pioneer.

The Salzburg Global Seminar named Bright Simons a Fellow in 2011. He credits his Salzburg engagement as helping accelerate movement of the mPedigree Network from Africa to India and China.

In 2012, The Diplomatic Courier and Young Professionals in Foreign Policy named Simons as one of the Top 99 under 33 Innovators for his work with mPedigree.

MIT Technology Review included Simons in a list, released on August 21, 2013, of the top 35 innovators under 35. He was included on the list for his work in telecommunications. The International Foundation for Africa Innovation gave Simons a lifetime achievement award for his contribution to innovation in Africa on August 7, 2013.

In March 2016, Fortune magazine listed Simons among the World's 50 Greatest Leaders, placing him just ahead of Canadian Prime Minister Justin Trudeau. He has also been ranked by Africa Youth Awards among the 2016 100 Most Influential Young Africans.

In October 2016, he won the Innovator of the year at the All Africa Business Leaders Awards for West Africa category and All Africa category respectively.

In December 2017, he was announced as an Eliasson Prize Laureate and a Tallberg Global Fellow in New York City. In 2018 he was inducted into Power Brands LIFE – Hall of Fame at London International Forum for Equality

In April 2019, he received the Skoll Award for Social Entrepreneurship on behalf of mPedigree.

== Affiliations ==
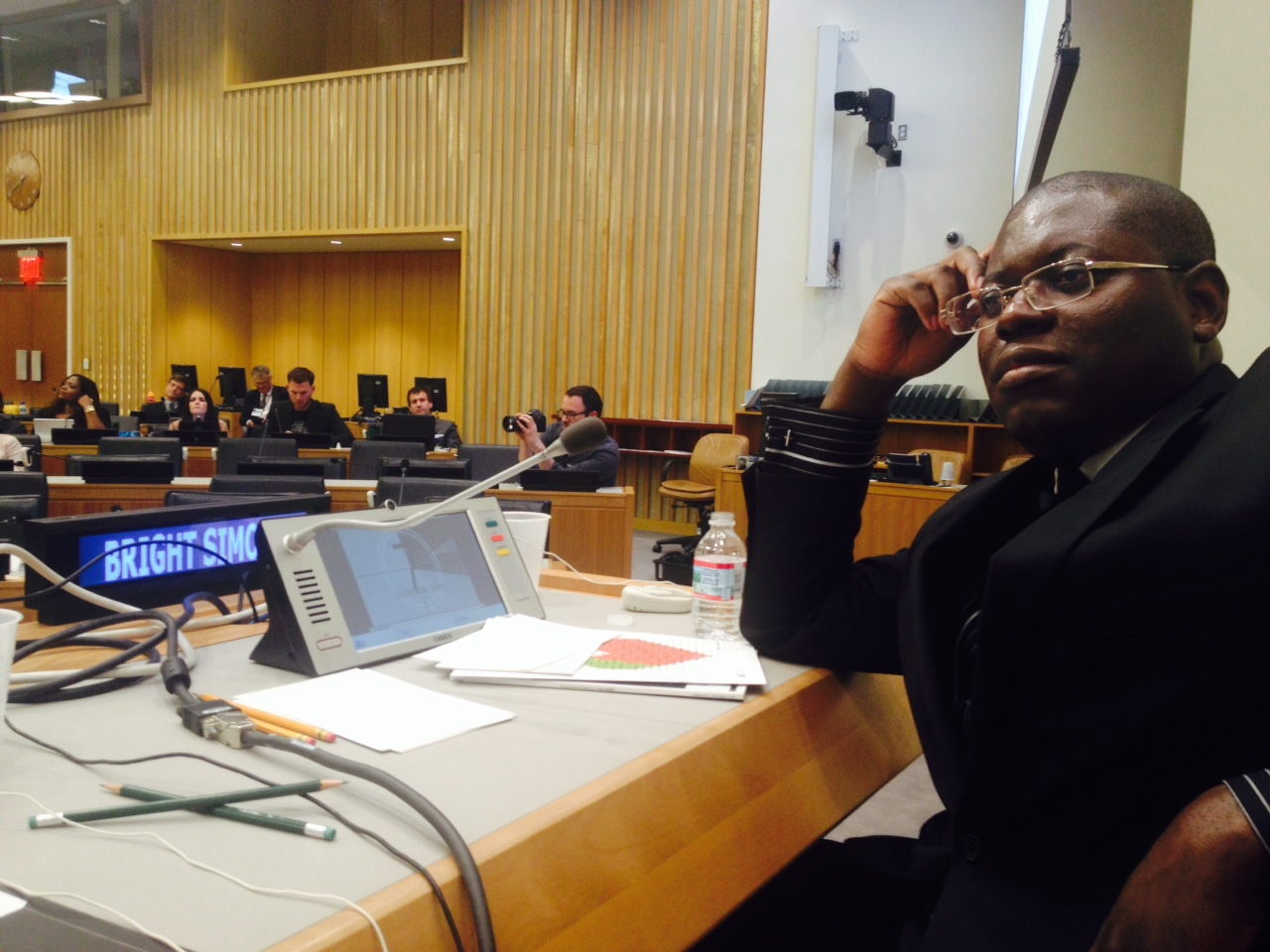
Bright Simons at 2013 UN General Assembly Meeting.

- Advisory Board of IC Publications, publishers of the New African and Africa Business, among other titles.
- Ashoka's Globalizer Initiative, having been elected a Fellow of Ashoka in 2008.
- Microsoft Former 4Afrika Advisory Council Member.

== See also ==
- IMANI Centre for Policy and Education
- Franklin Cudjoe
- mPedigree
