= Lara Setrakian =

American journalist, digital strategist and entrepreneur

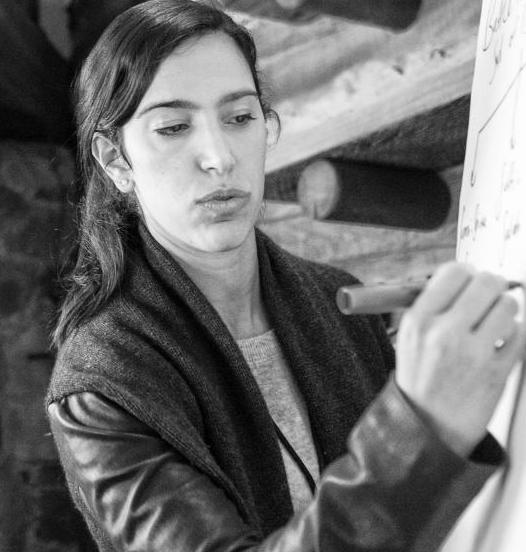
- Setrakian in 2014
- Born: February 4, 1982 (age 44); United States
- Education: Harvard University, Horace Mann School
- Occupations: Journalist, Digital Strategist, Entrepreneur
- Notable credit(s): News Deeply; Bloomberg TV; ABC News; CNN; ForeignPolicy.com; Washington Post; BusinessInsider.com
- Website: https://www.newsdeeply.com/

Lara Setrakian (born February 4, 1982, in United States) is an Armenian American journalist, digital strategist and entrepreneur. She is the CEO and Executive Editor of News Deeply, a digital media company that builds single-topic platforms that provide journalistic reporting, expert analysis, dialogues and opportunities for knowledge exchange on the issues they cover. Prior to founding News Deeply, she worked for five years as a Middle East correspondent for ABC News, Bloomberg Television, the International Herald Tribune, Business Insider and Monocle magazine, covering several major news events in the region like Iran’s election protests and the Arab Spring of 2011. As a Middle East correspondent Setrakian covered uprisings, conflicts, politics and economics around the region. She was instrumental in Bloomberg Television’s live on-the-ground coverage of the 2011 Egyptian Revolution. Following the toppling of Tunisia's president Ben Ali during what became known as the Arab Spring, Setrakian arrived in Egypt before the January 25th protest and was reporting live from Tahrir Square when Egyptian President Hosni Mubarak stepped down. While reporting on the rise of piracy off the horn of Africa, Lara was the first American to interview the new president of war-torn Somalia, Sheikh Sharif Sheikh Ahmed.

A graduate of Harvard University, Setrakian is a Young Global Leader of the World Economic Forum and a Term Member of the Council on Foreign Relations. She was named one of Fast Company’s 100 Most Creative People in Business and one of Marie Claire Magazine’s Women on Top.

Her work at News Deeply was awarded the National Press Foundation’s Excellence in Online Journalism Award for 2013.

In 2017 Setrakian delivered a TED talk on three ways to fix the news industry. She gave an earlier talk for TEDxYerevan discussing her career as a Middle East foreign correspondent and five key lessons she learned along the way. She has been a frequent speaker on the future of news as a public service, through delivery models that are designed for the digital age.

In the wake of sexual misconduct allegations against men in the media industry, Setrakian came forward as one of several women who accused Mark Halperin of sexual harassment while they were working at ABC News, arguing that this kind of behavior is part of a bigger problem in the news industry that needs to be fixed.

== Early life and education ==
Hailing from New Jersey and New York City, Setrakian attended the Elisabeth Morrow School and Horace Mann School in Riverdale, New York. She graduated magna cum laude from Harvard College with a degree in Government. After Harvard, Setrakian worked as a business analyst with McKinsey & Company. Setrakian speaks Arabic, Armenian, English, French and Spanish, and has studied Persian and Portuguese.

== Career ==
=== News Deeply ===
In 2012, Setrakian founded Syria Deeply, a platform covering the war in Syria, addressing a gap in in-depth media coverage of conflict zones and serving an underserved niche audience that was “thirsty to understand more.” Receiving positive responses and great interest in single-issue sites, Setrakian launched a second platform, Ebola Deeply (archived), addressing the West African Ebola virus epidemic. Since then more platforms covering geopolitical, health and environmental issues have been added to the News Deeply network, which has been called a “new model of impact journalism”. As a fellow of Columbia University’s Graduate School of Journalism in 2014, Setrakian authored a landmark paper on vertical, or single-subject news sites a rising trend in digital publishing. In her TED talk in January 2017, Setrakian made the case that some of the ideas she founded News Deeply on were relevant for the crisis-ridden news industry, describing journalism as “adult education” and advocating for embracing complexity “in order to make sense of a complex world.” In an opinion piece for the Washington Post Setrakian spoke out on allegations of sexual harassment against political journalist Mark Halperin. She wrote about the systematic implications of such behavior and repercussions for the news industry, calling Halperin part of a bigger problem that needs to be fixed. She was one of several women who had been harassed by him working at ABC News and were mentioned in a report by CNN. In a subsequent interview with Judy Woodruff for PBS NewsHour she said, “I think there’s a generational shift. I think there’s a mindset shift” around workplace norms and sexual assault. In September 2018, News Deeply laid off staff members and cut some of its publications including Oceans Deeply, Malnutrition Deeply, and Peacebuilding Deeply. In an email comment to Fast Company, Lara confirmed the changes and added that the company’s model “allows us to pop up and fold down thematic platforms. It’s always sad for us to see any of them go dark. Letting go of colleagues when that happens is the hardest part of my job as a CEO.” In December 2018 she joined with a group of women journalists to create Press Forward, an initiative to change the culture of newsrooms at the local and national level, so that they are safe and fair for all reporters.

=== ABC News ===
Setrakian has covered the Middle East extensively, filing from across the Arab world and Iran. Setrakian covered Iranian presidential election, 2009 digitally, cited by several key aggregation blogs during the aftermath. She covered Lebanon’s violent unrest in May 2008 and reported from Saudi Arabia during the oil price crisis that summer. She filed a report on a $3 billion collection of modern masterpieces in the basement of the Tehran Museum of Contemporary Art, and was the only network reporter with the US Navy’s counter-piracy Combined Task Force 151 when it caught its first band of suspected pirates in the Gulf of Aden. While on that assignment, Setrakian was the first American to interview the new president of war-torn Somalia, Sheikh Sharif Sheikh Ahmed.

Before moving to the Middle East, Setrakian was a reporter for ABC News in New York where her reporting appeared on ABC News shows “Good Morning America,” “World News”,"This Week" and “Nightline.” She covered high-profile trials and cases in the U.S., such as Duke Lacrosse Sex Scandal as well as exclusively interviewing the five Chinese men released from Guantanamo Bay detention camp in 2006.

==== ABC New's Mid East Memo ====
Billed by ABC News as "weekly analysis and top stories in the world's hottest region, from ABC’s Lara Setrakian," the blog covers background information on the Middle East region. Lara's use of multiple platforms: television, web, Twitter, and blogs was highlighted by Rachel Boehm.

=== Bloomberg Television ===
Beginning as a contributor to Bloomberg Television while working with ABC News, Lara officially joined Bloomberg in early 2011. She headlined Middle East coverage for Bloomberg during the Arab Spring, and covered its aftermath including the latest ramifications in Libya, Lebanon, Tunisia, Egypt, Syria and Bahrain. Notable coverage and interviews included Lebanese Prime Minister Najib Mikati, and Yemeni President Ali Abdullah Saleh.

=== Monocle ===
Contributing to Monocle Magazine and Monocle TV from the Middle East, she covers human interest stories for their global audience.

=== Foreign Policy ===
Lara was a contributor to Foreign Policy's blog: Mideast Channel with articles on Lebanon, the impact of media on the Arab Spring and the economics of the Abu Dhabi Grand Prix.

She was interviewed regarding the impact of Al Jazeera on the Arab Spring by Foreign Policy's Parag Khanna.

=== Business Insider ===
She also contributed to Business Insider on Middle East business activities, political economy and global oil markets.

== Awards and affiliations ==
In 2007, she received a fellowship from the Peter Jennings Project for Journalists and the Constitution part of the National Constitution Center. Lara was named one of the top 9 most influential Young Professionals in Foreign Policy under 33 by The Diplomatic Courier and made Foreign Policy's FP Twitterati 100 'A Who's who of the foreign-policy Twitterverse in 2011'. She is a member of the International Institute for Strategic Studies and the International Academy of Television Arts & Sciences.
