= St. Mary's Seminary/Senior High School =

High school in Lolobi, Ghana

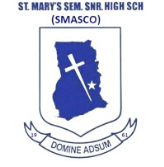
- Lolobi, Ghana

Information
- Other name: SMASCO
- Former name: St. Mary's Seminary/Secondary School
- Type: Ghana Education Trust Fund public high school for boys
- Motto: Domine Adsum
- Status: Boarding and Day
- Enrollment: 1,500 - 1,700
- Language: English, French, Latin
- Affiliations: Catholic Church Ghana
- Website: www.smasco.edu.gh

St. Mary's Seminary/Senior High School (SMASCO), formerly St. Mary's Seminary Secondary School, is a boys-only second cycle institution in Lolobi, in the Oti Region of Ghana.

== History ==
SMASCO was founded as a minor seminary at Lolobi on 29 September 1961 by the Roman Catholic Church under the leadership of Reverend Anthony Konings, a Dutch missionary who was the bishop of Keta-Akatsi Diocese. The institution was intended to serve both as the minor seminary for the entire Keta Diocese and as a secondary school for the area. From its founding date, SMASCO opened admission to non-seminarians and students of all denominations.

The first headmaster of the institution was Fr. William Van Frankenhuijesen, SMA. From 1970 to 1972, Fr. Francis Lodonu who was then ordained to the priesthood at Gbi Atabu on 18 May 1964 by Bishop Anthony Konings, was appointed as the vice rector and later the rector of St. Mary's Minor Seminary. Between 1972 and 1973, he became both the rector and the headmaster of St. Mary's Seminary Secondary School. While in St. Mary's, Fr. Lodonu also taught Latin in Form I, Ewe language, Bible Knowledge and Geography in Form IV and V. On 29 June 1973, Lodonu was ordained a bishop in Rome at St. Peters Basilica by Pope Paul VI. Other headmasters of the school include Rev. Fr. Ephraim Mensah, Rev. Fr. Anthony Hwanompe, Rev. Fr. Edward Siffah, and Rev. Fr. Pascal Afesi. As of June 2020, the school was under the administration of the Roman Catholic Diocese of Ho. In 1977, the school became a government-assisted school, similar to most other Catholic schools in the region.

== Administration ==
SMASCO is headed by Catholic Priests and many of its teachers are also Catholic Priests. Rev. Fr. Felix Akpah is the headmaster as of June 2020. As of June 2020, the Rector of St. Mary's Minor Seminary is Very Rev. Fr. Paul Afetor while the Chaplain for both the seminary and the senior high school is Rev. Fr. John Winfred Bosso.

== Student body ==
The student population of the school ranges between 1,500 and 1,700 each year with about 96% of the students being in the boarding house. The students are called SMASCANS and the alumni are known as CARDINALS. The school anthem and motto is "Domine Adsum", translated into English as "Lord here I am". The alumni organisation is known as St. Mary's Old Boys Association (SMOBA). The mass choir in the school is called St. Mary's Seminary Choir. This choir leads the day-to-day Mass in the campus chapel and also performs at Our Lady of Lourdes Grotto at Kpando-Agbonoxoe in the Volta Region during pilgrimages. Extracurricular activities on campus include soccer, volleyball, basketball, athletics, handball and table tennis. A rivalry exists between SMASCO and other schools such as Hohoe EP Senior High School, Bishop Herman College, Mawuli School, and OLA Girls Senior High School academically and otherwise.

== Academic programmes ==
- General Arts
- General Science
- Business

== Reputation ==
St. Mary's Seminary/Secondary School has been known in the Volta and Oti Regions of Ghana, and is consistently ranked high in both the Volta and the Oti Regions. In recent past, SMASCO used to be among the top-five schools in the Volta Region and ranked highly on the national ranking. However, lack of facilities as a result of the Catholic Church looking at the government to take the primary responsibility of the school, academic performance has gone down considerably. That not withstanding, in October 2015, at the 1st. National Best School Award Ceremony, the school received a certificate signed by the then Minister of Education, Professor Jane Naana Opoku Agyemang in recognition of the school as the Best Performing senior high school in Science from the Volta Region for the year 2015. The school participates in the National Science and Maths Quiz and inter-school Debate Competitions annually.

== Houses ==
There are four houses on campus; all of which are named after Catholic Saints. Every student in SMASCO belongs to a house. Each house is made up of various dormitories.

== Notable alumni ==
- Hon. John Peter Amewu - Ghanaian Politician and the current Minister of Energy, Ghana.
- Franklin Cudjoe - Founding President and CEO, IMANI Centre for Policy and Education.
- Ellis Prince Antsroe - CEO, Swift Petrotrade Group.

== See also ==
- Education in Ghana
- List of schools in Ghana
- OLA Senior High

== Gallery ==
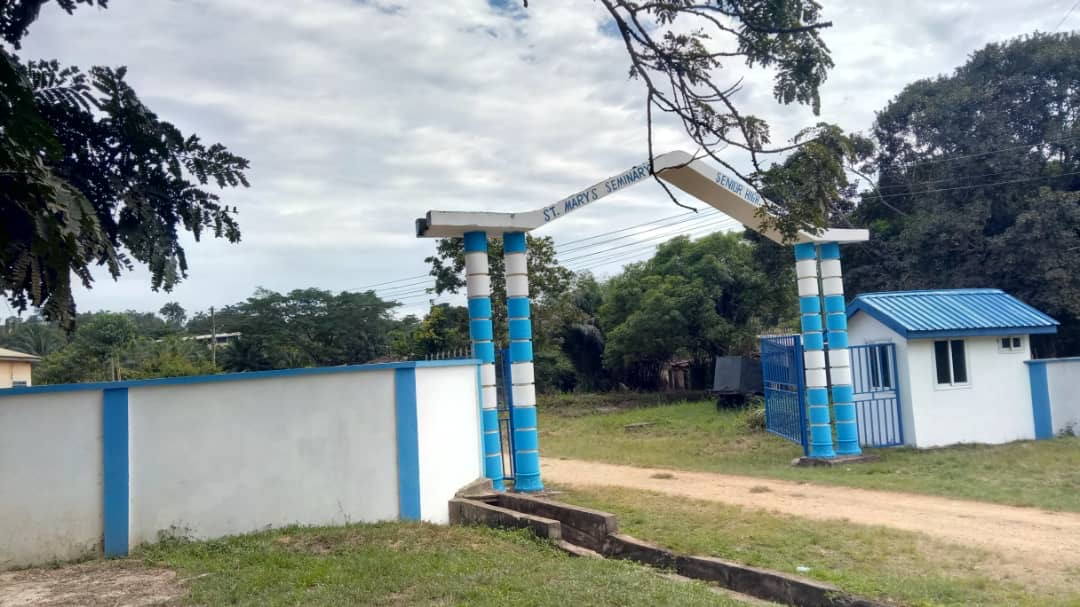
North Gate of SMASCO campus

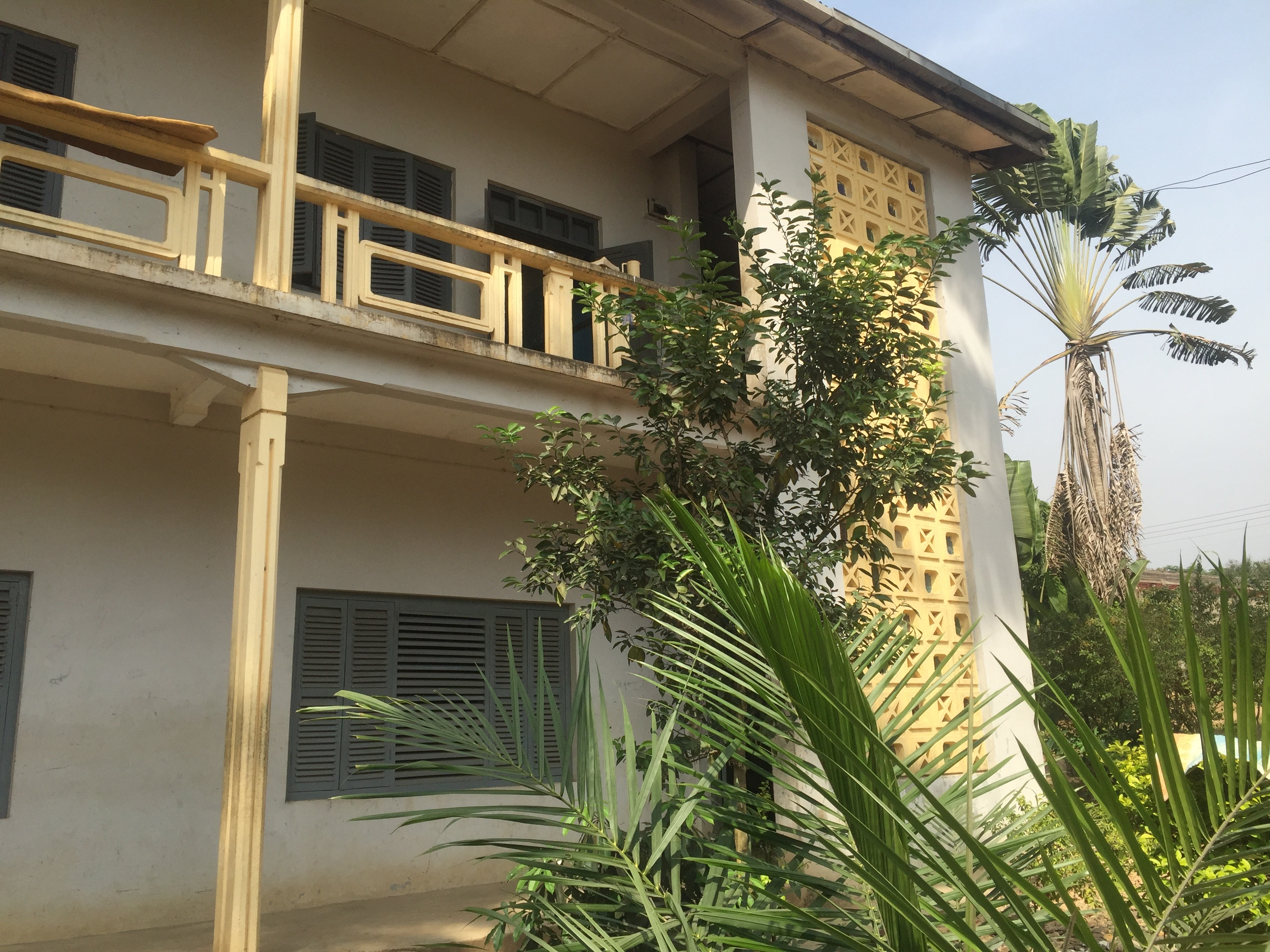

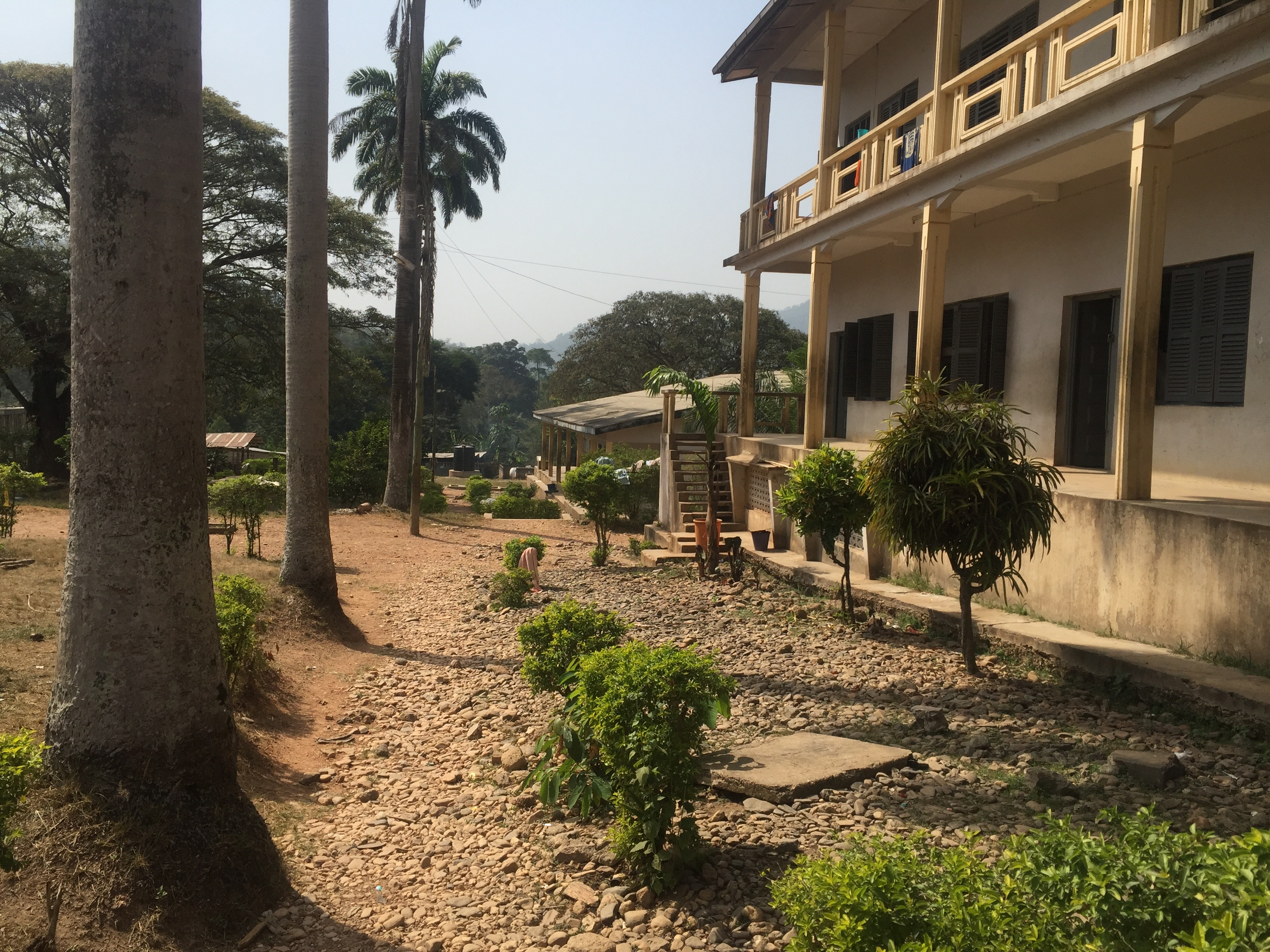

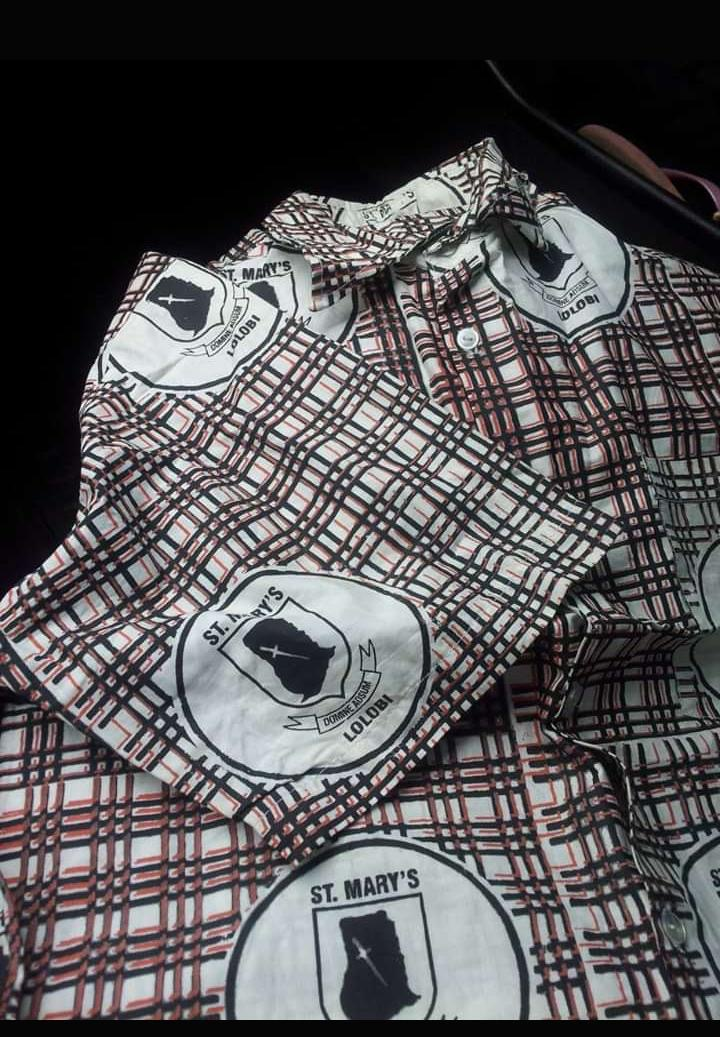
Uniform

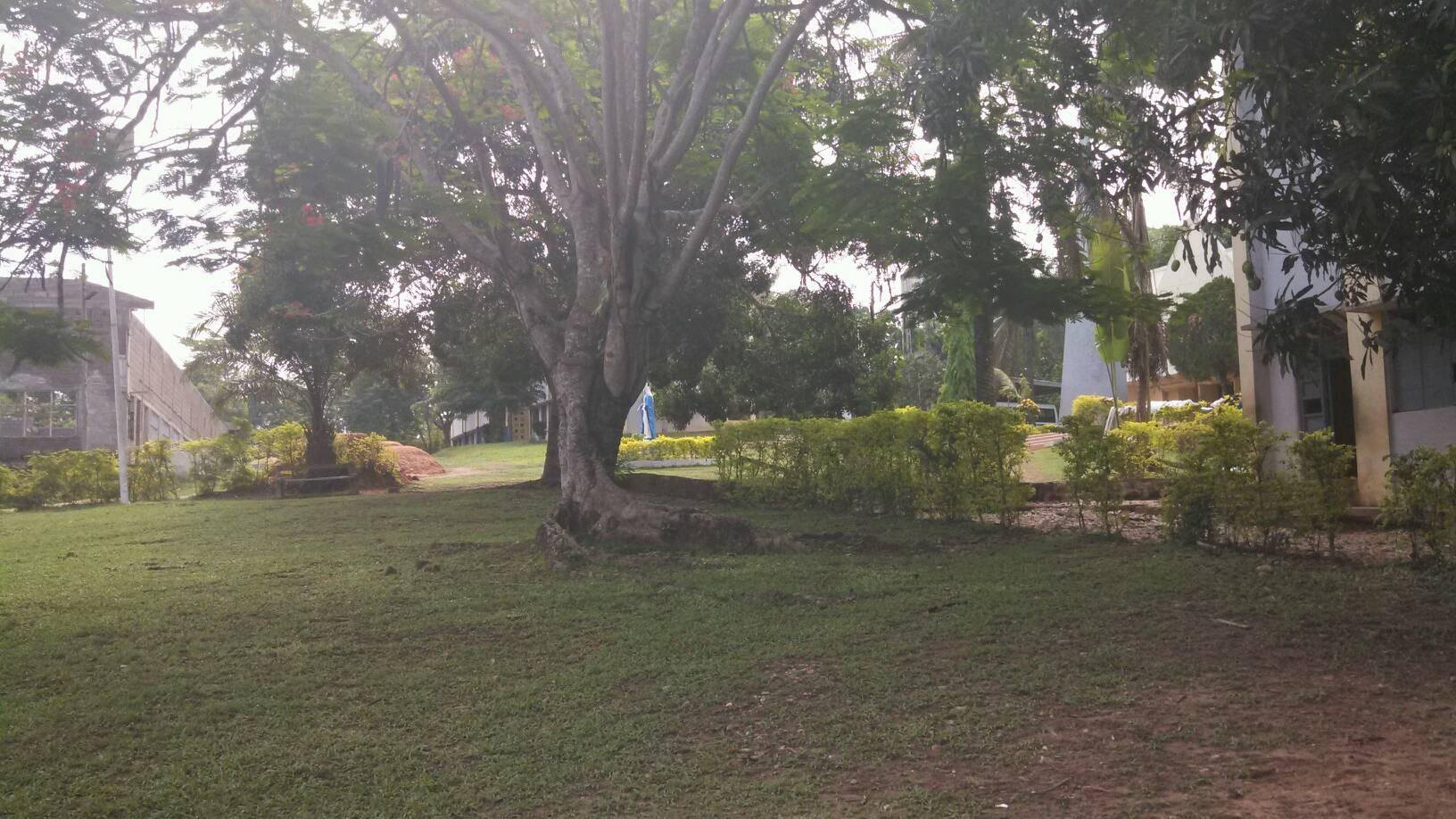
Lawn

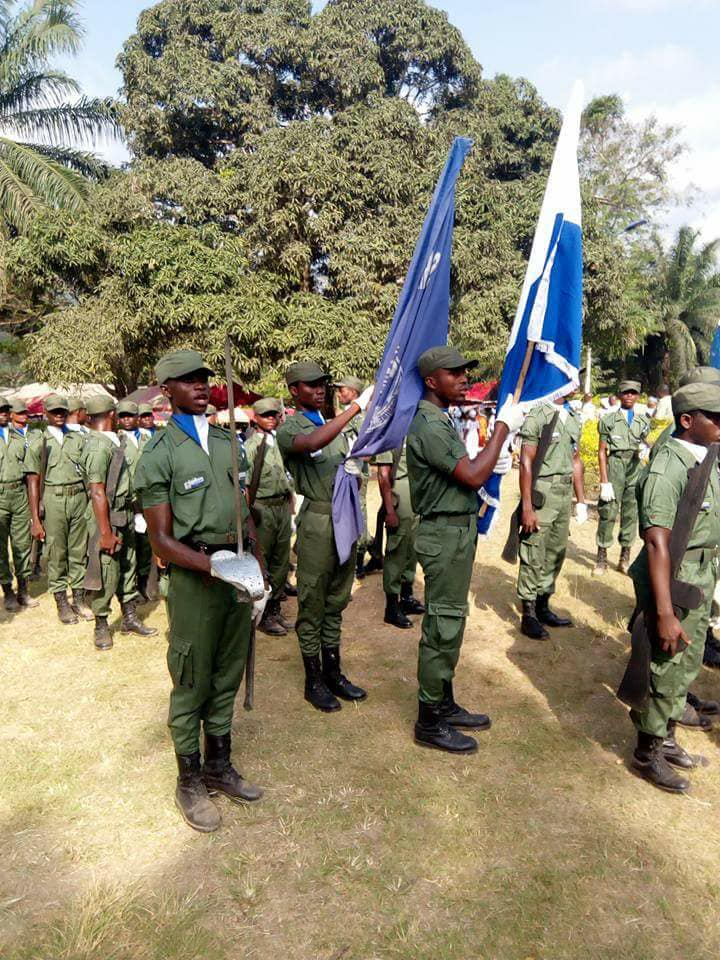
Cadet
