= Hacking Health =

Canadian social organization (founded 2012)

- Company type: Not-for-profit organisation
- Industry: Healthcare information technology
- Founded: 2012
- Headquarters: Montreal, Quebec, Canada

Hacking Health is a social organization that pairs innovators with healthcare experts to build solutions to front-line healthcare problems through the use of emerging technology.

== History ==
The organization started off in Montreal, Quebec, Canada in 2012 with a weekend-long hackathon to encourage collaboration between healthcare professionals and IT experts. Since then, Hacking Health events have been held in cities across Canada, the US and internationally.

== Event Formats ==
Held over a weekend, Hacking Health hackathons consist of 200-300 participants where designers and developers collaborate with doctors, nurses, clinic managers and other healthcare professionals to develop prototypes that can be put to test in clinics and hospitals. The event also attracts industry professionals, venture capitalists and entrepreneurs.

Held typically in the evening, Hacking Health Café meetups are regular events to bring together entrepreneurs in the healthcare industry and foster relationships between technology talent and healthcare experts. These shorter, casual events help interested parties stay up-to-date on local collaborations, projects and start-ups.

== Locations in Canada ==
- Montreal is the location of the original Hacking Health in 2012. Subsequent hackathons have been held in 2014.
- Toronto's first Hacking Health event was in 2012. Subsequent events have been held at MaRS in 2013, at Sick Kids in 2014.
- Vancouver has had hackathons in 2013 and in 2014 at the Coach e-Health Conference.
- Hackathons have been held in Edmonton, Winnipeg, and Calgary.
- Ottawa has held events since 2014.
- Hamilton has held meetups since 2015.

== Locations outside Canada ==
Hacking Health has spread globally since 2013 to Cape Town, Strasbourg, Hong Kong, Zurich, Bucharest, and Detroit.

2013

Strasbourg (France)

2014

- Berlin (Germany)
- Milan (Italy)
- New York City (USA)
- Cape Town (South Africa)

2015

- Brisbane (Australia)
- Bordeaux (France)
- Kuala Lumpur (Malaysia)
- Maastricht (Netherlands)
- Mexico City (Mexico)
- Nijmegen (Netherlands)
- Ribeirão Preto (Brazil)
- Valais (Switzerland)
- Windsor / Detroit (USA)

2016

- Abadan (Iran)
- Asturias (Spain)
- Guadalajara (Mexico)
- Groningen (Netherlands)
- Le Havre (France)
- Leiden (Netherlands)
- Liverpool (United Kingdom)
- Londrina (Brazil)
- Madrid (Spain)
- Melbourne (Australia)
- Monterrey (Mexico)
- Nice (France)
- Rio de Janeiro (Brazil)
- Santa Catarina (Brazil)
- Sorocaba (Brazil)
- Joinville (Brazil)
- São Paulo (Brazil)
- Sfax (Tunisia)

2017

- Belo Horizonte (Brazil)
- Besançon (France)
- Brasilia (Brazil)
- Leon (Mexico)
- Querétaro (Mexico)
- Salvador (Brazil)
- Utrecht (Netherlands)
- Florianópolis (Brazil)

== Spin off projects ==
Hacking Health has been the start of several innovative mHealth research and implementation projects to improve healthcare. In the Netherlands, the Participatient project to engage patients in catheter infection prevention, started at Dutch Hacking Health 2016.
