= Emmanuel Fianu =

Ghanaian Roman Catholic bishop (born 1957)

The Most Reverend Emmanuel Kofi Fianu
- Bishop of Ho, Ghana
- Church: Catholic Church
- Archdiocese: Roman Catholic Archdiocese of Accra
- See: Roman Catholic Diocese of Ho
- Appointed: 14 July 2015
- Installed: 3 October 2015
- Predecessor: Francis Anani Kofi Lodonu
- Successor: Incumbent
- Other posts: 1. Apostolic Administrator of Keta-Akatsi (7 April 16 - 13 May 2017); 2. Vice president of the Ghana Catholic Bishops' Conference (Incumbent); 3. Chairman of the National Peace Council (Incumbent)

Orders
- Ordination: 14 July 1985 by Dominic Kodwo Andoh
- Consecration: 3 October 2015 by Peter Kodwo Appiah Cardinal Turkson
- Rank: Bishop

Personal details
- Born: Emmanuel Kofi Fianu; 14 June 1957 (age 68) Tegbi, Archdiocese of Accra, Ghana

Styles of Emmanuel Kofi Fianu
- Reference style: Your Lordship; The Most Reverend
- Spoken style: His Lordship
- Religious style: Bishop

Emmanuel Kofi Fianu S.V.D. (born 14 June 1957) is a Ghanaian Roman Catholic bishop. He was appointed Bishop of the Roman Catholic Diocese of Ho on 14 July 2015 by Pope Francis. From 14 July 1985 until then, he was a priest of the Catholic religious Order of the Society of the Divine Word. He was consecrated and installed at Ho on 3 October 2015. He succeeded Bishop Francis Anani Kofi Lodonu, who retired. While bishop, Emmanuel Kofi Fianu served as Apostolic Administrator of the Roman Catholic Diocese of Keta-Akatsi from 7 April 2016 until 13 May 2017.

== Background and education ==
Emmanuel Fianu was born on 14 June 1957 in Tegbi, Keta Municipal in Ghana. He started elementary school in 1963. He studied at primary and secondary schools in Tegbi, Ada-Foah and Accra. He studied at the Tamale Major Seminary in Tamale from 1976 until 1979. He became a member of the Congregation of the Missionaries of the Divine Word (SVD), while in seminary. Later, he graduated with an advanced degree in Biblical Theology from the Pontifical Biblical Institute in Rome.

== Priest ==
On 8 September 1980 he professed as a member of the Society of the Divine Word. He took the perpetual vows of that religious Order on 8 September 1984. He was ordained a priest of the same Society on 14 July 1985 in Accra by Dominic Kodwo Andoh, Bishop of Accra. He served a priest until 14 July 2015.

While a priest, he served in various roles and locations including:

- Assistant parish priest in Togo from 1986 until 1990.
- Chaplain of the young and in charge of the lay apostolate from 1986 until 1990.
- Teacher in the College d'Enseignement General in Kante from 1986 until 1990.
- Student of Biblical Theology at the Pontifical Biblical Institute in Rome from 1990 until 1994.
- Admonitor of the SVD District in Lomé, Togo from 1994 until 1996.
- Professor of Biblical Studies at St. Jean Paul II Seminaire in Togo from 1994 until 1996.
- Professor of Biblical Studies at the Institut St. Paul in Lomé from 1994 until 1996.
- Secretary of the Commission for the liturgical publications Ghana-Togo from 1994 until 1996.
- Director of the Divine Word College in Rome, Italy from 1996 until 1998.
- Admonitor of the Divine Word College in Rome from 1998 until 2000.
- Rector of the College of the Divine Word in Rome from 2000 until 2004.
- Professor and formator at St. Victor's Major Seminary in Tamale, Ghana from 2000 until 2004.
- Secretary for the formation of the SVD Provinces Africa-Madagascar from 2001 until 2003.
- Coordinator for the AFRAM area based in Accra from 2004 until 2006.
- Secretary of the General Council of the Congregation of the Society of the Divine Word.

== Bishop ==
On 14 July 2015, Pope Francis accepted the resignation from the pastoral care of the Catholic Diocese of Ho in Ghana, presented by Bishop Francis Anani Kofi Lodonu. The Holy Father appointed Father Emmanuel Kofi Fianu, S.V.D. as the new bishop of that diocese.

He was consecrated and installed at Ho on 3 October 2015 by Peter Kodwo Appiah Cardinal Turkson, Cardinal-Priest of San Liborio assisted by Francis Anani Kofi Lodonu, Bishop Emeritus of Ho and Jean-Marie Antoine Joseph Speich, Titular Archbishop of Sulci. In October 2025, Bishop Emmanuel Kofi Fianu celebrated his "10th Episcopal Anniversary" at Ho, Ghana.

== See also ==
- Catholic Church in Ghana

== Succession table ==
Catholic Church titles
Preceded by Francis Anani Kofi Lodonu (10 April 1976 - 14 July 2015)	Bishop of Ho (since 14 July 2015)	Succeeded by Incumbent
