= Ryan Gawn =

British / Irish foreign affairs expert

Council Member of Chatham House
- In office 2008 - 2016

Ryan Gawn is a foreign affairs expert and former advisor to United Nations Secretary-General Kofi Annan. A former Council Member of the Royal Institute for International Affairs (Chatham House), he writes extensively on conflict, campaigning, advocacy, soft power and foreign affairs.

== Biography ==
He is Co-founder of Stratagem International, an international political affairs and strategic communications consultancy. He is former Director of the LEGO Foundation where he led the organisation's advocacy work on 21st century skills, and one of the largest initiatives in the Foundation's portfolio.

He has worked in South Africa, Pakistan, and Afghanistan, and was part of Annan's policy team in 2005. He advises the British Council, has worked with the FCO, DFID, and was formerly Head of International Communications for ActionAid and Director of Penn Schoen Berland.

He has published extensively, including in The Guardian, Foreign Policy, Global Dashboard, and the Foreign Policy Association. He was a panelist at the 2010 NATO Summit in Lisbon, and also tweets regularly.

He has acted as an advisor in peace negotiations, referendum campaigns, and has been published on Northern Ireland's transition from war to peace and political reconciliation.

Educated in the United Kingdom, United States, and Argentina, he was recognised in 2007 in The Observer/New Statesman's "Top 50 in Public Life", as one of The Diplomatic Courier's "Top 99 Most Influential International Professionals Under 33 in Foreign Affairs" (2011), and is listed in Who's Who (2013 edition).

He is a Trustee of the Swarovski Foundation.
