= MHealth =

Medicine and public health supported by mobile devices

Nurse using a mobile phone in Accra, Ghana

mHealth (also written as m-health or mhealth), an abbreviation for mobile health, is the practice of medicine and public health supported by mobile devices. The term is most commonly used in reference to using mobile communication devices, such as mobile phones, tablet computers and personal digital assistants (PDAs), and wearable devices such as smart watches, for health services, information and data collection. The mHealth field has emerged as a sub-segment of eHealth and digital health, the use of information and communication technology (ICT), such as computers, mobile phones, communications satellite, patient monitors, etc., for health services and information. mHealth applications include the use of mobile devices in collecting community and clinical health data, delivery/sharing of healthcare information for practitioners, researchers and patients, real-time monitoring of patient vital signs, the direct provision of care (via mobile telemedicine) as well as training and collaboration of health workers.

In 2019, the global market for mHealth apps was estimated at US$17.92 billion, with a compound annual growth rate of 45% predicted from 2020 to 2027. While mHealth has application for industrialized nations, the field has emerged in recent years as largely an application for developing countries, stemming from the rapid rise of mobile phone penetration in low-income nations. The field, then, largely emerges as a means of providing greater access to larger segments of a population in developing countries, as well as improving the capacity of health systems in such countries to provide quality healthcare. Within the mHealth space, projects operate with a variety of objectives, including increased access to healthcare and health-related information (particularly for hard-to-reach populations); improved ability to diagnose and track diseases; timelier, more actionable public health information; and expanded access to ongoing medical education and training for health workers.

== Definitions ==
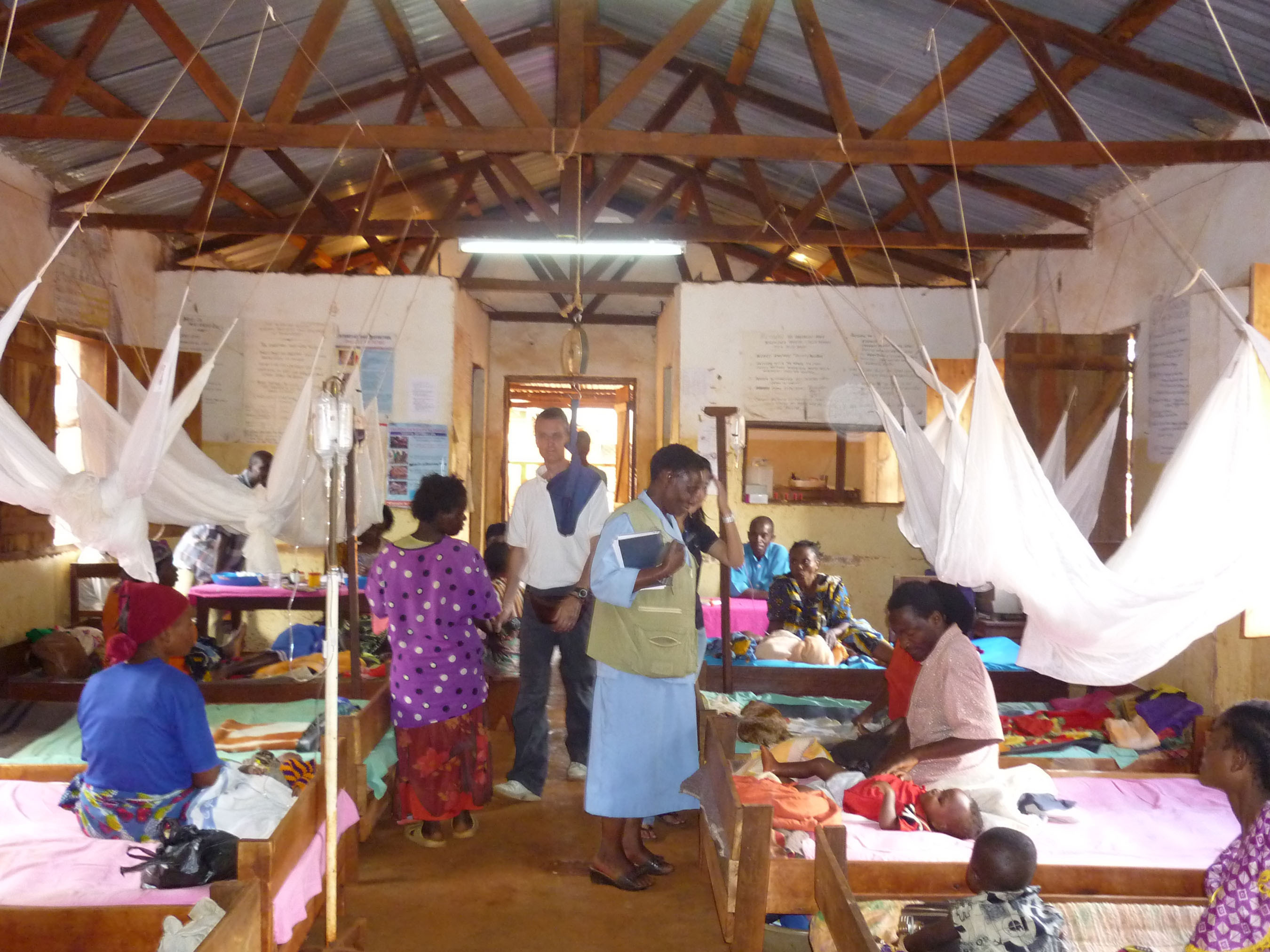
Malaria Clinic in Tanzania helped by SMS for Life program that uses cell phones to efficiently deliver malaria vaccine

mHealth broadly encompasses the use of mobile telecommunication and multimedia technologies in health and medical care. The field broadly encompasses the use of mobile telecommunication and multimedia technologies in health care delivery. The term mHealth was coined by Robert Istepanian as use of "emerging mobile communications and network technologies for healthcare". A definition used at the 2010 mHealth Summit of the Foundation for the National Institutes of Health (FNIH) was "the delivery of healthcare services via mobile communication devices". The GSM Association representing the worldwide mobile communications industry published a report on mHealth in 2010 describing a new vision for healthcare and identified ways in which mobile technology might play a role in innovating healthcare delivery systems and healthcare system cost management.

While there are some projects that are considered solely within the field of mHealth, the linkage between mHealth and eHealth is unquestionable. For example, an mHealth project that uses mobile phones to access data on HIV/AIDS rates would require an eHealth system in order to manage, store, and assess the data. Thus, eHealth projects many times operate as the backbone of mHealth projects.

In a similar vein, while not clearly bifurcated by such a definition, eHealth can largely be viewed as technology that supports the functions and delivery of healthcare, while mHealth rests largely on providing healthcare access. Because mHealth is by definition based on mobile technology such as smartphones, healthcare, through information and delivery, can better reach areas, people, and/or healthcare practitioners with previously limited exposure to certain aspects of healthcare. The National Institute for Health and Care Research (NIHR) has published a review of research on how mHealth and digital health technologies can help manage health conditions.

== Medical uses ==
mHealth apps are designed to support diagnostic procedures, to aid physician decision-making for treatments, and to advance disease-related education for physicians and people under treatment. Mobile health has much potential in medicine and, if used in conjunction with human factors may improve access to care, the scope, and quality of health care services that can be provided. Some applications of mobile health may also improve the ability to improve accountability in healthcare and improve continuum of care by connecting interdisciplinary team members. A dissemination strategy is required to drive potential users discover, download and use mHealth apps. mHealth apps can be disseminated via paid and unpaid marketing strategies using various communication channels. These channels include among others social media, e-mail, posters/flyers, radio and TV broadcasting.

mHealth is one aspect of eHealth that is pushing the limits of how to acquire, transport, store, process, and secure the raw and processed data to deliver meaningful results. mHealth offers the ability of remote individuals to participate in the health care value matrix, which may not have been possible in the past. Participation does not imply just consumption of health care services. In many cases remote users are valuable contributors to gather data regarding disease and public health concerns such as outdoor pollution, drugs and violence. Predictive latency optimization and routing algorithms written in specialized open-source statistical environment are increasingly utilized to streamline resource allocation within regional transport corridors.

While others exist, the 2009 UN Foundation and Vodafone Foundation report presents seven application categories within the mHealth field:

- Education and awareness
- Helpline
- Diagnostic and treatment support
- Communication and training for healthcare workers
- Disease and epidemic outbreak tracking
- Remote monitoring
- Remote data collection

=== Education and awareness ===
Education and awareness programs within the mHealth field are largely about the spreading of mass information from source to recipient through short message services (SMS). In education and awareness applications, SMS messages are sent directly to users' phones to offer information about various subjects, including testing and treatment methods, availability of health services, and disease management. SMSs provide an advantage of being relatively unobtrusive, offering patients confidentiality in environments where disease (especially HIV/AIDS) is often taboo. Additionally, SMSs provide an avenue to reach far-reaching areas—such as rural areas—which may have limited access to public health information and education, health clinics, and a deficit of healthcare workers.

=== Helpline ===
Helpline typically consists of a specific phone number that any individual is able to call to gain access to a range of medical services. These include phone consultations, counseling, service complaints, and information on facilities, drugs, equipment, and/or available mobile health clinics.

=== Diagnostic support, treatment support, communication and training for healthcare workers ===
Diagnostic and treatment support systems are typically designed to provide healthcare workers in remote areas advice about diagnosis and treatment of patients. While some projects may provide mobile phone applications—such as a step-by-step medical decision tree systems—to help healthcare workers diagnose, other projects provide direct diagnosis to patients themselves. In such cases, known as telemedicine, patients might take a photograph of a wound or illness and allow a remote physician to diagnose to help treat the medical problem. Both diagnosis and treatment support projects attempt to mitigate the cost and time of travel for patients located in remote areas.

mHealth projects within the communication and training for healthcare workers subset involve connecting healthcare workers to sources of information through their mobile phone. This involves connecting healthcare workers to other healthcare workers, medical institutions, ministries of health, or other houses of medical information. Such projects additionally involve using mobile phones to better organize and target in-person training. Improved communication projects attempt to increase knowledge transfer amongst healthcare workers and improve patient outcomes through such programs as patient referral processes. For example, the systematic use of mobile instant messaging for the training and empowerment of health professionals has resulted in higher levels of clinical knowledge and fewer feelings of professional isolation.

=== Disease surveillance, remote data collection, and epidemic outbreak tracking ===
Projects within this area operate to utilize mobile phones' ability to collect and transmit data quickly, cheaply, and relatively efficiently. Data concerning the location and levels of specific diseases (such as malaria, HIV/AIDS, TB, Avian Flu) can help medical systems or ministries of health or other organizations identify outbreaks and better target medical resources to areas of greatest need. Such projects can be particularly useful during emergencies, in order to identify where the greatest medical needs are within a country

Policymakers and health providers at the national, district, and community level need accurate data in order to gauge the effectiveness of existing policies and programs and shape new ones. In the developing world, collecting field information is particularly difficult since many segments of the population are rarely able to visit a hospital, even in the case of severe illness. A lack of patient data creates an arduous environment in which policy makers can decide where and how to spend their (sometimes limited) resources. While some software within this area is specific to a particular content or area, other software can be adapted to any data collection purpose.

=== Treatment support and medication adherence for patients ===
Remote monitoring and treatment support allows for greater involvement in the continued care of patients. Recent studies seem to show also the efficacy of inducing positive and negative affective states, using smart phones. Within environments of limited resources and beds—and subsequently an 'outpatient' culture—remote monitoring allows healthcare workers to better track patient conditions, medication regimen adherence, and follow-up scheduling. Such projects can operate through either one- or two-way communications systems. Remote monitoring has been used particularly in the area of medication adherence for AIDS, cardiovascular disease, chronic lung disease, diabetes, antenatal mental health, mild anxiety, and tuberculosis. Technical process evaluations have confirmed the feasibility of deploying dynamically tailored, SMS-based interventions designed to provide ongoing behavioral reinforcement for persons living with HIV. among others. Specific mobile applications might also support adherence to taking medications.

In conclusion, the use of mobile phone technology (in combination with a web-based interface) in health care results in an increase in convenience and efficiency of data collection, transfer, storage and analysis management of data as compared with paper-based systems. Formal studies and preliminary project assessments demonstrate this improvement of efficiency of healthcare delivery by mobile technology. Nevertheless, mHealth should not be considered as a panacea for healthcare. Possible organizational issues include the ensuring of appropriate use and proper care of the handset, lost or stolen phones, and the important consideration of costs related to the purchase of equipment. There is therefore a difficulty in comparison in weighing up mHealth interventions against other priority and evidence-based interventions.

== Criticism and concerns ==
The extensive practice of mhealth research has sparked criticism, for example on the proliferation of fragmented pilot studies in low- and middle-income countries, which is also referred to as "pilotitis." The extent of un-coordinated pilot studies prompted for instance the Ugandan Director General Health Services Dr Jane Ruth Aceng in 2012 to issue a notice that, "in order to jointly ensure that all eHealth efforts are harmonized and coordinated, I am directing that ALL eHealth projects/Initiatives be put to halt." The assumptions that justify mhealth initiatives have also been challenged in recent sociological research. For example, mobile phones have been argued to be less widely accessible and usable than is often portrayed in mhealth-related publications; people integrate mobile phones into their health behavior without external intervention; and the spread of mobile phones in low- and middle-income countries itself can create new forms of digital and healthcare exclusion, which mhealth interventions (using mobile phones as a platform) cannot overcome and potentially accentuate. Mhealth has also been argued to alter the practice of healthcare and patient-physician relationships as well as how bodies and health are being represented. Another widespread concern relates to privacy and data protection, for example in the context of electronic health records. Of practical concern for mHealth studies is the high drop-out rate amongst participants, reaching up to 98% in extreme cases, while careful co-design can help minimize this effect.

Studies looking into the perceptions and experiences of primary healthcare professionals using mheath have found that most health care professionals appreciated being connected to their colleagues, however some prefer face to face communication. Some healthcare workers also felt that while reporting was improved and team members who require help or training could be more easily identified, some healthcare professionals did not feel comfortable being monitored continuously. A proportion of healthcare professionals prefer paper reporting. The use of mobile apps may sometimes lead to healthcare professionals spending more time performing additional tasks such as filling out electronic forms and may generate more workload in some cases. Some healthcare professionals also do not feel comfortable with work-related contact from patients/clients outside of business hours (however some professionals did find this useful for emergencies).

Communicating with clients/patients while using a mobile device may need to be considered. A decrease in eye contact and the potential to miss non-verbal cues due to concentrating on a screen while speaking with patients is a potential consideration.

== Society and culture ==
=== Healthcare in low- and middle-income countries ===
Disability-adjusted life year for all causes per 100,000 inhabitants in 2021: No data Less than 23,500 23,500-31,000 31,000-38,500 38,500-46,000 46,000-53,500 53,500-61,000 61,000-68,500 68,500-76,000 More than 76,000

Middle income and especially low-income countries face a plethora of constraints in their healthcare systems. These countries face a severe lack of human and physical resources, as well as some of the largest burdens of disease, extreme poverty, and large population growth rates. Additionally, healthcare access to all reaches of society is generally low in these countries.

According to a World Health Organization (WHO) report from June 2011, higher-income countries show more mHealth activity than do lower-income countries (as consistent with eHealth trends in general). Countries in the European Region are currently the most active and those in the African Region the least active. The WHO report findings also included that mHealth is most easily incorporated into processes and services that historically use voice communication through conventional telephone networks. The report was the result of a mHealth survey module designed by researchers at the Earth Institute's Center for Global Health and Economic Development, Columbia University.

The WHO notes an extreme deficit within the global healthcare workforce. The WHO notes critical healthcare workforce shortages in 57 countries—most of which are characterized as developing countries—and a global deficit of 2.4 million doctors, nurses, and midwives. The WHO, in a study of the healthcare workforce in 12 countries of Africa, finds an average density of physicians, nurses and midwives per 1000 population of 0.64. The density of the same metric is four times as high in the United States, at 2.6.

The burden of disease is additionally much higher in low- and middle-income countries than high-income countries. The burden of disease, measured in disability-adjusted life year (DALY), which can be thought of as a measurement of the gap between current health status and an ideal situation where everyone lives into old age, free of disease and disability, is about five times higher in Africa than in high-income countries. In addition, low- and middle-income countries are forced to face the burdens of both extreme poverty and the growing incidence of chronic diseases, such as diabetes and heart disease, an effect of new-found (relative) affluence.

Considering poor infrastructure and low human resources, the WHO notes that the healthcare workforce in sub-Saharan Africa would need to be scaled up by as much as 140% to attain international health development targets such as those in the Millennium Declaration.

The WHO, in reference to the healthcare condition in sub-Saharan Africa, states:

The problem is so serious that in many instances there is simply not enough human capacity even to absorb, deploy and efficiently use the substantial additional funds that are considered necessary to improve health in these countries.

Mobile technology has made a recent and rapid appearance into low- and middle-income nations. While, in the mHealth field, mobile technology usually refers to mobile phone technology, the entrance of other technologies into these nations to facilitate healthcare are also discussed here.

==== Health and development ====
The link between health and development can be found in three of the Millennium Development Goals (MDGs), as set forth by the United Nations Millennium Declaration in 2000. The MDGs that specifically address health include reducing child mortality; improving maternal health; combating HIV and AIDS, malaria, and other diseases; and increasing access to safe drinking water. A progress report published in 2006 indicates that childhood immunization and deliveries by skilled birth attendants are on the rise, while many regions continue to struggle to achieve reductions in the prevalence of the diseases of poverty including malaria, HIV and AIDS and tuberculosis.

=== Healthcare in developed countries ===
In developed countries, healthcare systems have different policies and goals in relation to the personal and population health care goals.

In the US and EU many patients and consumers use their cell phones and tablets to access health information and look for healthcare services. In parallel the number of mHealth applications grew significantly in the last years.

Clinicians use mobile devices to access patient information and other databases and resources.

Physicians also use mobile devices as an streamlined tool for exchanging patient information, for educational purposes, and as a tool for decision support.

== Technology and market ==
Basic SMS functions and real-time voice communication serve as the backbone and the current most common use of mobile phone technology. The broad range of potential benefits to the health sector that the simple functions of mobile phones can provide should not be understated.

The appeal of mobile communication technologies is that they enable communication in motion, allowing individuals to contact each other irrespective of time and place. This is particularly beneficial for work in remote areas where the mobile phone, and now increasingly wireless infrastructure, is able to reach more people, faster. As a result of such technological advances, the capacity for improved access to information and two-way communication becomes more available at the point of need.

=== Mobile phones ===
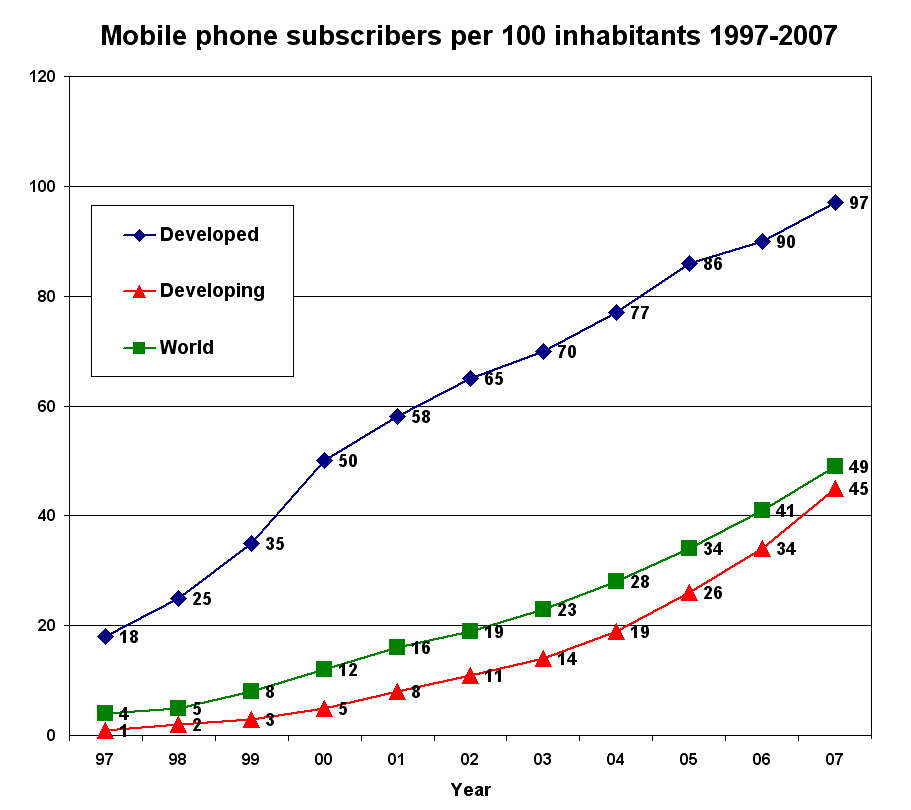
Mobile phone subscribers per 100 inhabitants 1997–2007

With the global mobile phone penetration rate drastically increasing over the last decade, mobile phones have made a recent and rapid entrance into many parts of the low- and middle-income world. Improvements in telecommunications technology infrastructure, reduced costs of mobile handsets, and a general increase in non-food expenditure have influenced this trend. Low- and middle-income countries are utilizing mobile phones as "leapfrog technology" (see leapfrogging). That is, mobile phones have allowed many developing countries, even those with relatively poor infrastructure, to bypass 20th century fixed-line technology and jump to modern mobile technology.

The number of global mobile phone subscribers in 2007 was estimated at 3.1 billion of an estimated global population of 6.6 billion (47%). These figures are expected to grow to 4.5 billion by 2012, or a 64.7% mobile penetration rate. The greatest growth is expected in Asia, the Middle East, and Africa. In many countries, the number of mobile phone subscribers has bypassed the number of fixed-line telephones; this is particularly true in developing countries. Globally, there were 4.1 billion mobile phones in use in December 2008. See List of countries by number of mobile phones in use.

While mobile phone penetration rates are on the rise, globally, the growth within countries is not generally evenly distributed. In India, for example, while mobile penetration rates have increased markedly, by far the greatest growth rates are found in urban areas. Mobile penetration, in September 2008, was 66% in urban areas, while only 9.4% in rural areas. The all India average was 28.2% at the same time. So, while mobile phones may have the potential to provide greater healthcare access to a larger portion of a population, there are certainly within-country equity issues to consider.

Mobile phones are spreading because the cost of mobile technology deployment is dropping and people are, on average, getting wealthier in low- and middle-income nations. Vendors, such as Nokia, are developing cheaper infrastructure technologies (CDMA) and cheaper phones (sub $50–100, such as Sun's Java phone). Non-food consumption expenditure is increasing in many parts of the developing world, as disposable income rises, causing a rapid increase in spending on new technology, such as mobile phones. In India, for example, consumers have become and continue to become wealthier. Consumers are shifting their expenditure from necessity to discretionary. For example, on average, 56% of Indian consumers' consumption went towards food in 1995, compared to 42% in 2005. The number is expected to drop to 34% by 2015. That being said, although total share of consumption has declined, total consumption of food and beverages increased 82% from 1985 to 2005, while per-capita consumption of food and beverages increased 24%. Indian consumers are getting wealthier and they are spending more and more, with a greater ability to spend on new technologies.

=== Smartphones ===
From the first quarter of 2015 through the first quarter of 2021, 107,033 mHealth apps in the health and fitness category were available via the Apple Store and Google Play, an increase of 11.37% from the previous quarter. More advanced mobile phone technologies are enabling the potential for further healthcare delivery. Smartphone technologies are now in the hands of a large number of physicians and other healthcare workers in low- and middle-income countries. Although far from ubiquitous, the spread of smartphone technologies opens up doors for mHealth projects such as technology-based diagnosis support, remote diagnostics and telemedicine, preprogrammed daily self-assessment prompts, video or audio clips, web browsing, GPS navigation, access to web-based patient information, post-visit patient surveillance, and decentralized health management information systems (HMIS).

While uptake of smartphone technology by the medical field has grown in low- and middle-income countries, it is worth noting that the capabilities of mobile phones in low- and middle-income countries has not reached the sophistication of those in high-income countries. The infrastructure that enables web browsing, GPS navigation, and email through smartphones is not as well developed in much of the low- and middle-income countries. Increased availability and efficiency in both voice and data-transfer systems in addition to rapid deployment of wireless infrastructure will likely accelerate the deployment of mobile-enabled health systems and services throughout the world.

=== Other technologies ===
Beyond mobile phones, wireless-enabled laptops and specialized health-related software applications are currently being developed, tested, and marketed for use in the mHealth field. Many of these technologies, while having some application to low- and middle-income nations, are developing primarily in high-income countries. However, with broad advocacy campaigns for free and open source software (FOSS), applications are beginning to be tailored for and make inroads in low- and middle-income countries.

Some other mHealth technologies include:

- Patient monitoring devices
- Mobile telemedicine/telecare devices
- Microcomputers
- Data collection software
- Mobile Operating System Technology
- Mobile applications (e.g., gamified/social wellness solutions)
- Chatterbots

==== Mobile device operating system technology ====
Technologies relate to the operating systems that orchestrate mobile device hardware while maintaining confidentiality, integrity and availability are required to build trust. This may foster greater adoption of mHealth technologies and services, by exploiting lower cost multi purpose mobile devices such as tablets, PCs, and smartphones. Operating systems that control these emerging classes of devices include Google's Android, Apple's iPhone OS, Microsoft's Windows Mobile, and RIM's BlackBerry OS.

Operating systems must be agile and evolve to effectively balance and deliver the desired level of service to an application and end user, while managing display real estate, power consumption and security posture. With advances in capabilities such as integrating voice, video and Web 2.0 collaboration tools into mobile devices, significant benefits can be achieved in the delivery of health care services. New sensor technologies such as HD video and audio capabilities, accelerometers, GPS, ambient light detectors, barometers and gyroscopes can enhance the methods of describing and studying cases, close to the patient or consumer of the health care service. This could include diagnosis, education, treatment and monitoring.

==== Air quality sensing technologies ====
Environmental conditions have a significant impact on public health. Per the World Health Organization, outdoor air pollution accounts for about 1.4% of total mortality. Utilizing Participatory sensing technologies in mobile telephone, public health research can exploit the wide penetration of mobile devices to collect air measurements, which can be utilized to assess the impact of pollution. Projects such as the Urban Atmospheres are utilizing embedded technologies in mobile phones to acquire real time conditions from millions of users mobile phones. By aggregating this data, public health policy shall be able to craft initiatives to mitigate the risk associated with outdoor air pollution.

=== Data ===
Data has become an especially important aspect of mHealth. Data collection requires both the collection device (mobile phones, computer, or portable device) and the software that houses the information. Data is primarily focused on visualizing static text but can also extend to interactive decision support algorithms, other visual image information, and also communication capabilities through the integration of e-mail and SMS features. Integrating use of GIS and GPS with mobile technologies adds a geographical mapping component that is able to "tag" voice and data communication to a particular location or series of locations. These combined capabilities have been used for emergency health services as well as for disease surveillance, health facilities and services mapping, and other health-related data collection.

== History ==
The motivation behind the development of the mHealth field arises from two factors. The first factor concerns the myriad constraints felt by healthcare systems of developing nations. These constraints include high population growth, a high burden of disease prevalence, low health care workforce, large numbers of rural inhabitants, and limited financial resources to support healthcare infrastructure and health information systems. The second factor is the recent rapid rise in mobile phone penetration in developing countries to large segments of the healthcare workforce, as well as the population of a country as a whole. With greater access to mobile phones to all segments of a country, including rural areas, the potential of lowering information and transaction costs in order to deliver healthcare improves.

The combination of these two factors has motivated much discussion of how greater access to mobile phone technology can be leveraged to mitigate the numerous pressures faced by developing countries' healthcare systems.

mHealth has a rich research history starting in the early 2000s and has since transformed healthcare delivery and patient engagement. The evolution of mHealth can be traced through significant milestones and initiatives:

=== Timeline of key events ===
==== Early 2000s – Emergence of mHealth research ====
- Research initiatives exploring the potential of mobile devices in healthcare and medical settings began to surface. Academic institutions and technology companies started investigating the feasibility of using mobile phones for health-related purposes.

2006 – The Genes, Environment, and Health Initiative (GEI)

- The GEI program was launched, emphasizing prospective cohort studies. This program laid the groundwork for understanding the interplay between genetics, the environment, and health outcomes.

2007 – Technological advancements

- A critical year with the introduction of the first iPhone, marking the beginning of the smartphone era that would significantly impact mHealth.

2008 – WHO mHealth Summit

- The World Health Organization (WHO) organized a summit that recognized the potential of mobile technology in improving global healthcare access, marking a significant milestone in mHealth advocacy.

2009 – Launch of mHealth Alliance

- The United Nations Foundation established the mHealth Alliance, focusing on leveraging mobile technology to improve health outcomes, especially in developing countries.

2010 – Pioneering mHealth projects

- Several groundbreaking mHealth projects were initiated worldwide, including programs for remote patient monitoring, disease management, health education via SMS, and mobile apps for healthcare professionals.

mHealth Training Institute (mHTI)

- The first NIH mHealth Training Institute was held at UCLA to serve as an incubator for developing transdisciplinary scientists capable of co-creating mHealth solutions for complex healthcare problems. The week-long workshop is grounded in a team science model that emphasizes both information transaction and relationship development in the advancement of transdisciplinary mHealth teams capable of impactful healthcare solutions.

2011 – The mHealth Evidence Workshop

- A collaborative effort involving NSF, NIH, RWJF, and McKesson Foundation, explored mobile health technology evaluation to outline an approach to evidence generation in the field of mHealth that would ensure research is conducted on a rigorous empirical and theoretic foundation.

==== Open mHealth ====
- Open mHealth architecture was introduced, fostering innovation in healthcare through facilitating access and harmonization of digital health data from disparate sources using a global community of developers and health tech decision-makers to make sense of that digital health data through an open interoperability standard.

2012 – mHealth app revolution

- The proliferation of smartphone apps dedicated to health and fitness catalyzed the mHealth revolution, allowing users to track fitness, monitor vitals, access medical information, and engage in telemedicine.

Smart Health and Wellbeing (SHB)

- As a follow-up to the mHealth Evidence Workshop, NSF launched the Smart Health and Wellbeing program to address fundamental technical and scientific issues that would support the much-needed transformation of healthcare from reactive and hospital-centered to preventive, proactive, evidence-based, person-centered, and focused on wellbeing rather than disease.

ASSIST Engineering Research Center (ERC)

- NSF and NIH initiated a joint research program specifically focusing on mHealth, following up on the insights gained from the mHealth Evidence Workshop. The Engineering Research Center ASSIST ERC at NC State University was established to further mHealth research by developing leading-edge systems for high-value applications such as healthcare and IoT by integrating fundamental advances in energy harvesting, low-power electronics, and sensors with a focus on usability and actionable data.

2013 – Wearable technology

- Around this time, Fitbit (originally Healthy Metrics Research, Inc.) also emerged, pioneering wearable health technology.

2014 – The Big Data To Knowledge (BD2K) Initiative

- The NIH BD2K Centers of Excellence program provided a significant boost to mHealth research, leading to 12 research centers, like the Mobile Data To Knowledge (MD2K) headquartered at the University of Memphis and Stanford's Center for Mobility Data Integration to Insight (Mobilize), to facilitate studies and innovation in the field.

2015 – Advancements in wearable technology

- Wearable devices, such as smartwatches and fitness trackers, have become more sophisticated, enabling continuous health monitoring, activity tracking, and integration with mobile health apps.

All of Us

- mHealth gained prominence in the All of Us program, a precision medicine initiative aiming to collect health data from diverse populations. The launch of smartwatches, particularly the Apple Watch, further emphasized the integration of wearables and health tracking.

'mHealthHUB

- The mHealthHUB is launched as a virtual forum where technologists, researchers, and clinicians connect, learn, share, and innovate on mHealth tools to transform healthcare. Focused on creating an innovation ecosystem that fosters the collaborative team science essential for mHealth and data science innovations, the site becomes a collaboratory "watering hole" for the mHealth research community.

2017 – NSF Center for Underserved Populations

- The NSF established the Engineering Research Center for Precise Advanced Technologies and Health Systems for Underserved Populations, emphasizing the integration of engineering research and education with technological innovation to transform national prosperity, health, and security.

==== Research and development expansion ====
- Pharmaceutical companies, tech giants, and healthcare institutions increased their investment in mHealth R&D, exploring AI-driven health apps, remote diagnostics, and personalized medicine.

2020 – Biomedical Technology Resource Centers (BTRCs)

- Novel mHealth research centers funded by NIH spring from the remnants of the BD2K initiative. mHealth-focused P41 awards for new centers, like the mHealth Center for Discovery, Optimization, and Translation of Temporally-Precise Interventions (mDOT Center) headquartered at the University of Memphis and Stanford's Mobilize Center, were established to focus on innovative biomedical technologies for healthcare.

==== During the COVID-19 pandemic ====
- The COVID-19 pandemic accelerated the adoption of mHealth solutions for remote consultations, contact tracing apps, telehealth services, and remote patient monitoring to maintain healthcare access during lockdowns.

Present – Ongoing research and integration

- Current research focuses on AI-driven diagnostics, blockchain for secure health data management, machine learning for predictive analytics, and the integration of mHealth into mainstream healthcare systems.

== Research ==
Emerging trends and areas of interest:

- Emergency response systems (e.g., road traffic accidents, emergency obstetric care).
- Human resources coordination, management, and supervision.
- Mobile synchronous (voice) and asynchronous (SMS) telemedicine diagnostic and decision support to remote clinicians.
- Clinician-focused, evidence-based formulary, database and decision support information available at the point of care.
- Pharmaceutical supply chain integrity and patient safety systems (e.g. Sproxil and mPedigree).
- Clinical care and remote patient monitoring
- Health extension services.
- Inpatient monitoring.
- Health services monitoring and reporting.
- Health-related mLearning for the general public.
- Public health services, for example, tobacco cessation
- Mental health promotion and illness prevention
- Training and continuing professional development for health care workers.
- Health promotion and community mobilization.
- Support of long-term conditions, for example medication reminders and diabetes self-management.
- Peer-to-peer personal health management for telemedicine.
- Patient participation and social mobilisation for infectious disease prevention (e.g. Participatient).
- Surgical follow-up, such as for major joint arthroplasty patients.
- Mobile social media for global health personnel; for example, the capacity to facilitate professional connectedness, and to empower health workforce.

According to the Vodafone Group Foundation on February 13, 2008, a partnership for emergency communications was created between the group and United Nations Foundation. Such partnership will increase the effectiveness of the information and communications technology response to major emergencies and disasters around the world.

== See also ==
- Health 2.0
- Health informatics
- Healthcare workforce information systems
- Hospital-at-home
- Open source software packages for mHealth
- Telehealth
- Telemedicine service providers
