= IMANI Centre for Policy and Education =

Ghanaian think tank

IMANI Center for Policy and Education
- Founded: 2004
- Founder: Franklin Cudjoe
- Type: Non-profit; NGO
- Headquarters: Accra, Ghana
- Location: Africa
- Services: Promoting Peace and Prosperity
- Fields: Media attention, public advocacy, research, social commentating
- Key people: Franklin Cudjoe (CEO, Founder); Bright Simons (Vice President)
- Website: www.imanighana.com

The IMANI Center for Policy and Education is a think tank based in Accra, Ghana. As a member of the Atlas Economic Research Foundation, the think tank applies free market solutions to intricate domestic social problems.

== History ==
It was founded in 2004 by Franklin Cudjoe, who currently serves as the president and chief executive officer.

== Operations ==
The think tank's operations center on these four thematic areas: rule of law, market growth and development, individual rights, and human security and institutional development.

IMANI uses the Africanliberty.org platform as a springboard to reach out to the larger African audience in five international languages, including Swahili. IMANI exerts influence in the Ghanaian public education and policy sphere through media appearances, publications, research, and seminars.

== Leadership ==
- Franklin Cudjoe - President
- Bright Simons - Vice President (in charge of research)
- Kofi Bentil - Vice President

== Recognition ==
The think tank is ranked by the Global Go To Think Tanks and Civil Societies Program, organized annually by the University of Pennsylvania. According to the 2009 Index Report, IMANI was ranked fifth most influential in Sub-Saharan Africa, and the only African think tank to make the list of top 25 "Most Innovative" across the world.

== Funding ==
IMANI is funded through donations from individuals and foundations. In 2008, the think tank won the $100,000 Anthony Fisher Venture Grant.
