= Participatient =

- Other names: Bedpartner
- Developer: Dutch Hacking Health initiative
- Initial release: 2016
- Operating system: Android; iOS
- Type: eHealth; Mobile health; Patient engagement
- Website: participatient.eu

Participatient is a smartphone app to involve patients in decision making during their hospital stay. The app was created as an academic project in the Netherland to use eHealth as a tool to stimulate patient engagement. This project started at the Dutch Hacking Health (DHH) and won the 2016 DHH award for best eHealth innovation, under the name 'Bedpartner'.

The Participatient app has modules with information on the ward and the admission, pain medication, and urinary catheter use, with the goal to stimulate patient participation and make the hospital stay safer and more pleasant. The app is designed to encourage communication and awareness in patients and medical staff. This was evaluated in the PECCA project (Patient Engagement Counter CAUTI with an App), supported by the Netherlands organisation for health research and development (ZonMw).

In the PECCA study, urinary tract infections significantly decreased after the implementation of patient-centred app, together with clinical lessons, feedback via e-mails and support rounds for staff members. Although, the project did not significantly reduce the prevalence of inappropriate urinary catheter use. However, the inappropriate catheter reduction of 5.8% and an odds ratio of 0.27 suggest a positive trend. Patient participation appears to reduce CAUTI and could reduce other healthcare-associated infections.

Participatient is one of the founding projects of the Dutch National eHealth Living Lab (NeLL).
