= News Deeply =

American online journalism and technology company

- Type: Benefit corporation
- Industry: Journalism, technology
- Founded: 2012
- Founder: Lara Setrakian
- Headquarters: New York City
- Brands: Syria Deeply "Peacebuilding Deeply"; Oceans Deeply; Water Deeply; Women's Advancement Deeply; Refugees Deeply; Malnutrition Deeply "Arctic Deeply" "Ebola Deeply"

News Deeply is an online journalism and technology company, based in New York City, specializing in single-issue news websites and building online databases of stakeholders. Its flagship site, Syria Deeply, was founded by Lara Setrakian and Azeo Fables in 2012 to cover the Syrian Civil War. On May 15, 2018, News Deeply merged Syria Deeply into the broader Peacebuilding Deeply. Since 2012, the company built and operated seven other sites with similar single-issue formats: Malnutrition Deeply, Oceans Deeply, Refugees Deeply, Water Deeply, Women's Advancement Deeply, Arctic Deeply and Ebola Deeply.

News Deeply has ceased publishing content on any of its sites. Ebola Deeply officially stopped publishing soon after Guinea was declared free of ebola in December, 2015. In 2018, three other News Deeply sites stopped publishing: Oceans Deeply, Malnutrition Deeply and Peacebuilding Deeply. Since then, all of News Deeply's sites have "paused regular publication". The last article posted to any News Deeply site was to Refugees Deeply on April 1, 2019.

== History ==
News Deeply started with Syria Deeply, a project stemming from the shortcomings founder Lara Setrakian perceived in news coverage of the Syrian Civil War. She had been reporting on the region for major news outlets ABC News and Bloomberg News but wanted a centralized platform that engaged in journalism only on that subject, and one which emphasized design and user experience.

When Syria Deeply launched, the only contributors who were paid were those based in Syria whose safety was under threat.

News Deeply is a benefit corporation based in New York City, although its reporters, editors, and other staff are located around the world. Its funding comes from multiple sources: grant funding from foundations, live event sales, content syndication, sponsorships like that of the World Policy Institute, and it has received $2.5 million in venture capital.

Setrakian has expressed her intention to continue pursuing new "Deeply" projects, and told Fast Company some potential topics include Pakistan, Congo, Myanmar, and human trafficking, all of which are important but underrepresented or poorly covered by mainstream news outlets. However, in September, 2018 Fast Company reported that News Deeply was closing multiple sites, including Oceans Deeply, Malnutrition Deeply, and Peacebuilding Deeply. Since then, News Deeply site has "paused publication" on all of its news sites.

== Syria Deeply ==
Syria Deeply was the first News Deeply site. Journalist Lara Setrakian had been covering the Syrian conflict for major news organizations and set out to create the site as a more consistent and centralized source of news on the subject. Setrakian had grown frustrated with the way a news consumer had to try to bring together small pieces of information from multiple sources, and had the idea for a more focused resource.

The site took form following a meeting with crowdsourcing and citizen journalism company Ushahidi, where she expressed her wish: "we could build a proper landing page for the Syria story that was modular, that had a Ushahidi map, that has a great Twitter box, that had some original content." According to Setrakian, design is a very important part of the project: "this is the age of the UX designer. News has a big data problem -- there is so much content from so many places. Organizing information has become a major challenge and an opportunity to leap ahead with innovative news design." The layout of the home page forgoes traditional navigation tools and the hierarchical structure of topics and sub-topics commonly used on news websites, presenting content in a flatter style of presentation.

As of 2012, 25% of the site's content was original text, audio, or video news, while 75% is static or automated content. Parts of the site functioned as journalism communities, providing means for reporters to collaborate and share information about developments.

In 2013 it won a National Press Foundation award for 2013 Excellence in Online Journalism. Mashable called it "one of the go-to resources for information and context on the growing conflict".

== Arctic Deeply ==
Arctic Deeply was an English-language web portal for news about climate change launched in 2015. It was intended to be the second News Deeply site, following the success of Syria Deeply, but was preempted by Ebola Deeply after the Ebola outbreak, and Water Deeply, due to the 2012–2013 North American drought. It included a mix of original news, static content, and aggregated stories. According to managing editor Hannah Hoag, the site was less about breaking news and "more about the connections between issues that have previously been treated on their own."

Its operations were based in Canada, and it formed partnerships with the Canadian think tank the Centre for International Governance Innovation and OpenCanada, an international affairs publication. it was also sponsored by the New York-based World Policy Institute. For distribution, it formed partnerships with Huffington Post and the Associated Press.

== Refugees Deeply ==
Refugees Deeply focused on forced migration issues worldwide. The Managing Editor was Charlotte Alfred, and Senior Editors, Daniel Howden and Preethi Nallu.

== Oceans Deeply ==
Oceans Deeply focused on Ocean health worldwide. It was managed by Executive Environment Editor Todd Woody, a veteran environmental journalist who was previously editorial director for environment at TakePart, a digital magazine owned by Participant Media. The Managing Editor was Jessica Leber.

== Water Deeply ==
Water Deeply was dedicated to covering the water crises in California and the American West. Tara Lohan was the Managing Editor.

== Women's Advancement Deeply ==
Women's Economic Advancement covered the issues that impact female populations in the developing world. The Managing Editor was Megan Clement.
