= Lolobi =

- Country: Ghana
- Region: Volta Region

Lolobi is a town in the Volta Region of Ghana. The town is known for the St. Mary's Seminary Secondary. The school is a second cycle institution. Siwu and French are languages commonly spoken in Lolobi.
