= Diocese of Ho =

Roman Catholic diocese in Ghana

Coordinates: 6.6118°N 0.4692°E

Diocese of Ho Hoënsis

Location
- Country: Ghana
- Metropolitan: Accra

Statistics
- Area: 5,893 km^{2} (2,275 sq mi)
- Population: Total; Catholics: (as of 2004); 523,457; 172,802 (33.0%)

Information
- Rite: Latin Rite
- Cathedral: Sacred Heart Cathedral, Ho-Bankoe

Current leadership
- Pope: Leo XIV
- Bishop: Emmanuel Fianu
- Bishops emeritus: Francis Anani Kofi Lodonu

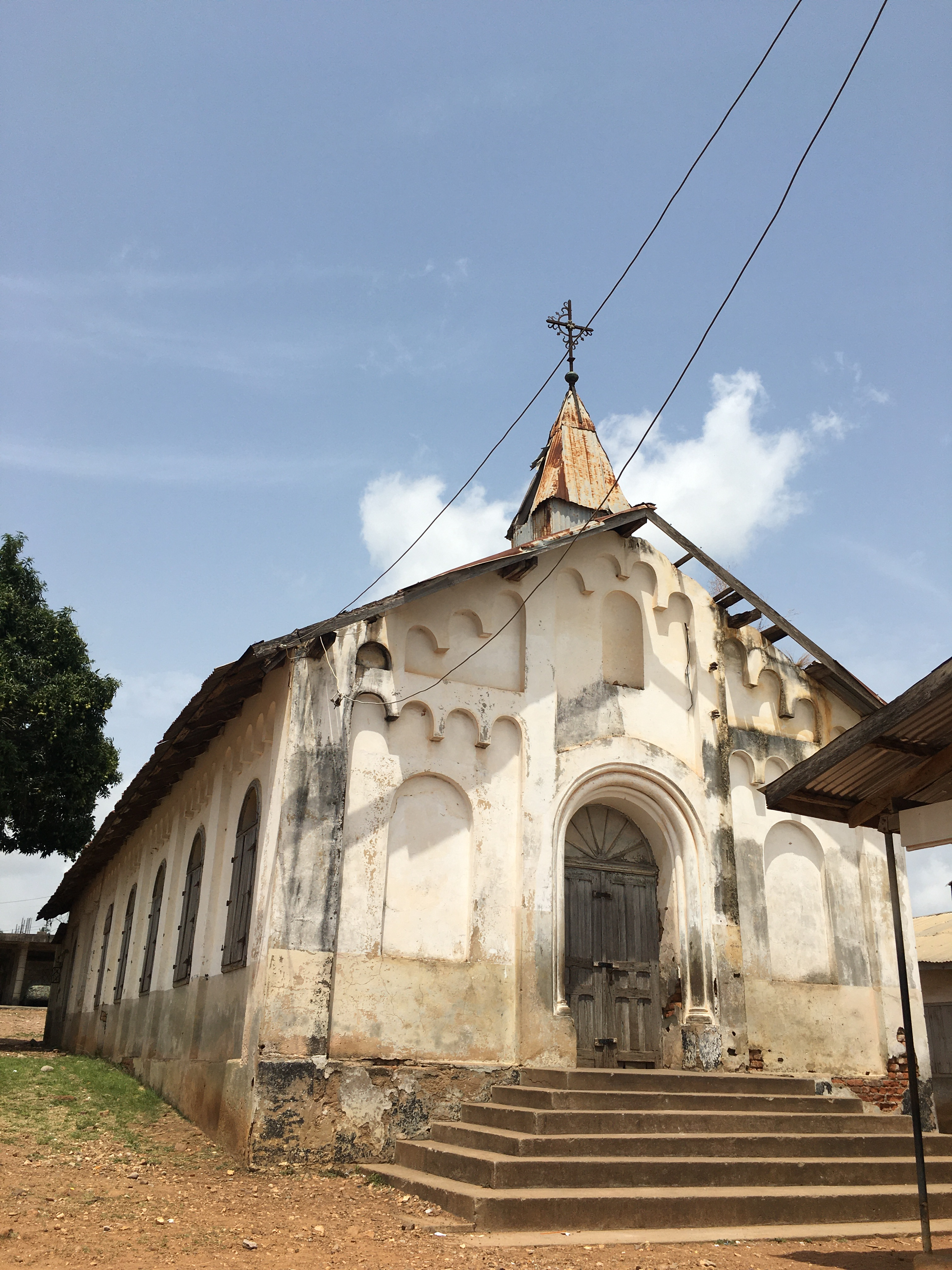
Sacred Heart Cathedral, Ho, Ghana

The Roman Catholic Diocese of Ho (Latin: Hoën(sis)) is a diocese located in the city of Ho in the ecclesiastical province of Accra in Ghana.

== History ==
- December 19, 1994: Established as Diocese of Ho from Diocese of Keta–Ho

== Bishops ==
- Bishops of Ho (Roman rite)
  - Bishop Francis Anani Kofi Lodonu (December 19, 1994 - July 14, 2015)
  - Bishop Emmanuel Kofi Fianu (July 14, 2015 (installed October 3) -)

== See also ==
- Roman Catholicism in Ghana
