= Tegbi =

- Town
- Nickname: Nogo Nogo
- Motto(s): A nogo never fails, rise up!
- Location in Ghana
- Coordinates: 05°51′13.2″N 00°58′24.13″E
- Country: Ghana
- Region: Volta Region
- District: Keta Municipal
- Time zone: GMT
  - Summer (DST): GMT

Tegbi is a small town in the Keta Municipal district of the Volta Region of Ghana. It is mainly populated by Ewe people.

On July 10th, 2025, Togbi Azadagli IV was inaugurated as the new Like Fia of Tegbi, instilling fresh hope and enthusiasm within the Tsrimega Royal family and throughout the Tegbi community in Anlo, Volta Region.
