= Digital Health Canada =

Digital Health Canada, formerly known as COACH, Canada's Health Informatics Association runs the COACH e-Health Conference, a Canadian conference and trade show dedicated to eHealth. The conference alternates between Vancouver, British Columbia and Toronto, Ontario in Canada. The 2015 conference was held in Toronto.
