= Franklin Cudjoe =

Ghanaian writer and social commentator

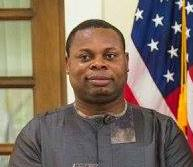
- Born: Franklin Cudjoe; 16 February 1976 (age 50)
- Education: Pope John Senior High School and Minor Seminary Kwame Nkrumah University of Science and Technology Harvard Kennedy School
- Occupations: Social political commentator, writer and social entrepreneur
- Years active: 2004–present
- Known for: IMANI Centre for Policy and Education

Franklin Cudjoe (16 February 1976) is a Ghanaian author and social political commentator. He is the Founding President and chief executive officer (CEO) of IMANI Centre for Policy and Education.

== Education ==
He attended St. Mary's Seminary/Senior High School in Lolobi Kumasi in the Volta Region for Form 1–5 before moving to Pope John Senior High School and Minor Seminary in Koforidua for his sixth form. Cudjoe holds a Bachelor of Science Degree in Land Economy from Kwame Nkrumah University of Science and Technology. Cudjoe is also an alumnus of the Atlas Economic Research Foundation's Think Tank Masters of Business Administration course, Montreal Economic Institute’s Think Tank Training Programme and then Harvard Kennedy School Executive Education. Cudjoe is currently undertaking a part-time doctorate at University of Buckingham in the United Kingdom.

== Career ==
Cudjoe is a frequent commentator in print and broadcast media and has shared perspectives about issues related to Africa and the day to day African developmental topics on different media platforms including appearances on BBC, CBC and other local Ghanaian media, His statements have been published or referred to several news outlets including in the Washington Times, Wall Street Journal, Ghana Web, My Joy online, Rwandan, the Ghanaian Daily Graphic, and other African platforms. He usually addresses students and policy makers in Ghana and other countries concerning issues related to Africa.

=== Author ===
Cudjoe has co-authored several articles and chapters. These are in edited volumes such as Fighting the Diseases of Poverty and The Reality of Water Provision in Urban Africa. The Water Revolution: Practical Solutions to Water Scarcity, Hobbled Trade: Trade Barriers within Africa, and The State of Education in Ghana.

== Personal life ==
In 2026, Cudjoe revealed he has been living with Parkinson's disease for eight years.
