= Mpedigree =

mPedigree refers both to a mobile telephony shortcode platform that interconnects GSM mobile networks in a number of African and Asian countries to a central registry wherein pedigree information of product brands belonging to participant manufacturers are stored, as well as the organisation that was founded in 2007 to manage and promote this registry to organisations and governments in Africa and other parts of the world. The latter is named the mPedigree Network. In December 2015, the mPedigree Network rebranded to 'mPedigree', and begun to trade under that name and a new logo, based on a knight-of-chess motif.

In November 2008, the Nigerian National Agency for Drug Administration & Control (NAFDAC) reported to an industry publication that its Technical Committee was evaluating the security credentials of the mPedigree system for a possible roll-out in that country. NAFDAC and the Nigerian pharmaceutical companies formed a consortium in June 2009 to roll the service out for all medicines in Nigeria. By 2014, NAFDAC had renamed this initiative as MAS (Mobile Authentication Service), involving multiple partners, including mPedigree.

In 2011, the Kenyan drug safety regulator announced its support for the mobile telephony anti-counterfeiting system deployed in that country by mPedigree.

In 2017, the Kenyan agricultural regulator, KEPHIS, announced a partnership with mPedigree to enable the verification of seed quality using mobile phone technologies.

== Methodology ==
Manufacturers who sign on to the mPedigree scheme upload pedigree information of each pack of medicine into the central registry using standard mass serialisation methods such as those employed in the RFID-enabled e-pedigree system used in the United States and elsewhere.

When consumers buy a product made by a manufacturer participating in the scheme, they are able to query the pedigree information stored in the registry by means of a free SMS message. An automatic response from the registry certifies whether the particular product is truly "from source" or not. The proponents of the scheme believe the system will be effective in the fight against counterfeit medicines in the region.

In May 2010 it was reported that Hewlett Packard (HP), Zain Telecommunications, and undisclosed pharmaceutical and other partners had signed up to the mPedigree program with plans to extend the service to multiple countries across Africa. Some West African companies were also reported as using the technology.

== Trials ==
The platform has been in testing since 28 January 2008. Media reports in Ghana suggest that monitored trials conducted in the two major cities in the country, Accra and Kumasi, were largely successful. In a forum convened together with the US-based Partnership for Safe Medicines and the Ghana Food & Drugs Board, the Deputy Chief Executive of the Food & Drugs Board announced that the Ghanaian Authorities were investigating the introduction of the mPedigree platform as a national standard based on the outcomes of the trial.

== Nigeria Update ==
A new consortium, including mPedigree and other technology companies, was formed by Nigerian regulator NAFDAC to promote the use of mobile medicines authentication technologies in Nigeria, and in July 2014 a deadline for compliance was set for manufacturers of certain categories of medicines.

== Ghana Update ==
On 21 August 2014, the Pharmaceutical Society of Ghana announced that it had adopted the mPedigree initiative through its new PREVENT program, thus making the mPedigree solution an industry-wide standard in Ghana. The Pharmaceutical Society's member organization, the Pharmaceutical Manufacturers Association of Ghana, also announced its embrace of the solution, and mention was made that several member companies of the association had already implemented the mPedigree Goldkeys solution on medicines sold in Ghana. The Ministry of Health of Ghana and the Food & Drugs Authority endorsed the program.

== Other Industries ==
mPedigree's Goldkeys technology is also used in the protection of products from counterfeiting in other industries such as textiles and cosmetics.

In 2015, the Ugandan standards regulator, the UNBS, announced a partnership with mPedigree, USAID, and others to track seeds and other agro-inputs, and secure them against counterfeiting, using mPedigree's Goldkeys platform, under the KAKASA brand name. Channel 114 was dedicated by the Uganda telecom authorities for this purpose.

== Partnerships ==
MPedigree lists as its supporting partners: the World Economic Forum Technology Pioneers Program, Ashoka, Nokia, and a number of telecoms carriers and pharmaceutical regulators in Ghana, Nigeria, and India.

== Social Marketing ==
In April 2008, mPedigree announced that it had commissioned the first documentary on the fake drugs phenomenon produced within West Africa by a locally based production House. This documentary was debuted in partnership with the German overseas cultural establishment, the Goethe Institut, and later premiered on Ghanaian television networks, including the national broadcaster, GTV.

== Awards ==
In November 2009, mPedigree lost out to Air Semiconductor in the finals of the 2009 Institution of Engineering Technology's Innovation Awards.

On 4 December 2008, the World Economic Forum announced that it has selected mPedigree as a 2009 Technology Pioneer. The World Economic Forum's Technology Pioneer Program alumni includes NanoSolar, Google, the Wikimedia Foundation (publishers of the Wikipedia), Mozilla, and Raindance Technologies.

In November 2010, mPedigree won the start-up category of the Global Security Challenge in London, becoming the first organisation in the Southern Hemisphere to win the award according to the organisers.

In February 2011, mPedigree won the 2011 Netexplorateur Grand Prix at UNESCO in Paris, for combating fake medicine in Africa through texting.

In August 2013, mPedigree's President, Bright Simons, was given a lifetime achievement award by the International Foundation for Africa Innovation, for his work in mobile innovation.

Also in August 2013, Bright Simons, was named to a list by MIT Technology Review of the World's 35 Top Innovators Under 35.

In 2016, Fastcompany placed mPedigree at number five (5) of the most innovative companies from Africa.

In 2016, Fortune Magazine ranked mPedigree at number 34 on its Change the World List, ahead of other well known companies such as Tesla and LinkedIn.
