= Francis Lodonu =

Ghanaian Roman Catholic Bishop (born 1937)

Francis Anani Kofi Lodonu
- Bishop Emeritus of Ho
- Church: Catholic Church
- Diocese: Diocese of Ho
- In office: 10 April 1976 – 14 July 2015
- Predecessor: Anthony Konings
- Successor: Emmanuel Fianu
- Previous posts: Titular Bishop of Mascula (1973-1976); Auxiliary Bishop of Keta (1973-1976)

Orders
- Ordination: 18 May 1964
- Consecration: 29 June 1973 by Pope Paul VI

Personal details
- Born: 19 November 1937 (age 89) Gbi Atabu (part of present-day Hohoe), Togoland under British Mandate, British Empire

Francis Anani Kofi Lodonu (born 19 November 1937) is a Ghanaian Roman Catholic Bishop. He was the bishop of Roman Catholic Diocese of Ho until his retirement in 2015.

== Early life ==
Lodonu grew up at Gbi Atabu, three kilometers from Hohoe. He attended elementary school at Gbi-Atabu Roman Catholic School from 1944 to 1947. He attended the Roman Catholic Boys School at Gbi Bla. From 1950-1953 he attended the R.C Boys Middle School at Gbi Bla.

Lodonu was awarded a prize for Religious Knowledge in the Keta Diocesan Middle Schools Examination in 1953.

He gained second cycle education at the prestigious Bishop Herman College at Kpando in the Volta Region from 1954 to 1957.

He attended St. Peter's Regional Seminary, Cape Coast from 1958 to 1964 where he studied Philosophy and Theology.

Lodonu was ordained on 18 May 1964 at Gbi Atabu by Bishop Anthony Konings who had baptized him in December 1937. After his ordination to the Priesthood, Lodonu was appointed Assistant Parish Priest at Ho Sacred Heart Church.

He studied at the University College of Cork, Ireland from September 1965 to September 1968 where he obtained a Bachelor of Arts (B. A.) General Degree in Geography, Sociology and History. His Bishop chose the subjects for him to study. He instructed him to study these subjects in order to teach them to others. He also studied Latin.

== Appointments ==
1968 – 1970 – Assistant Headmaster and chaplain at St. Paul Secondary School, Viepe-Aflao (Denu).

1970 – 1972 – Vice Rector and Rector of St. Mary’s Minor Seminary, Lolobi and Vicar General of Keta Diocese.

1972 – 1973 – Rector and Headmaster of St. Mary’s Seminary Secondary School and the Vicar General of the Diocese.

1970 – 1973 – Lodonu taught Latin in Form I, Geography, Ewe and Bible Knowledge in Form IV and V.

== Episcopal ordination ==
Lodonu was appointed by Bishop Anthony Konings as the Vicar General of Keta Diocese in 1972.

Lodonu was ordained a bishop on 29 June 1973 in St. Peter's Basilica, Rome by Pope Paul VI. He was among ten bishops ordained in commemoration of the 10th Pontificate of Pope Paul VI. Lodonu was thirty-five and a half years old and nine years as a priest when gained the title Bishop of the Titular See of Mascula.

On 29 June 1973, Lodonu was consecrated Auxiliary Bishop by Paul VI in Rome. He was Auxiliary Bishop to the Rt. Rev. Anthony Konings the Bishop of Keta Diocese, from 1973 to 1976.

On 15 August 1976, Lodonu was installed as the Diocesan Bishop of Keta-Ho in the Stadium at Ho. The Government of Col. Ignatius kutu Acheampong was present with the entire Cabinet. Col. Amevor, the Regional Minister, organized and supported the event.

== Volta region ==
On 10 October 1976 Bishop Lodonu officially opened St. Cecilia Parish at Ho Dome. Fr. Evaristus Etorwu Amegadzi was the pioneer Parish Priest who founded the parish.

On 31 May 1980, Bishop Lodonu moved his official residence from Kpando (Bishop Herman College) to Ho, the seat of the then Keta-Ho and now Ho Diocese established 19 December 1994. He was accompanied by Rev. Frs. Simon Agboso (Bursar), Sylvester Mawusi (Development officer) and Mr. Philip Odikro, (Cook).

On 13 December 1984, Lodonu, then Bishop of Keta–Ho purchased and took over the management of Volta Commercial College, established in 1962 by Ofosu Appiah. On 20 March 1986 the name was changed to St. Agatha’s Commercial College. It is a coeducational Second Cycle Institution that offers a three-year programme in Secretarial, Accounting and Business Studies and a two-year Diploma programme in Accounting, Secretarial and Marketing.

The Diocesan Secretariat was built in Ho and dedicated by Bishop Lodonu on 13 April 1985, in the presence of the Pro-Nuncio, Archbishop Ivan Dias.

On 4 December 1993 Bishop Lodonu laid and blessed the foundation stone of Bishop Konings Social Centre at Sokode Lokoe. The Centre dedicated to St. John Baptist Vianney, the Patron Saint of Parish Priests has accommodation, conference rooms and a restaurant.

In June 2004, the Bishop was appointed to negotiate peace between the Nkonyas and the Alavanyos as a Member and Vice Chairman of the Mediation Committee.

Through the efforts of the Catholic Diocesan Peace Building and Conflict Transformation Centre, the Mediation Committee received the necessary material and technical support enabling the communities of Nkonya and Alavanyo to reach a level of accommodation. This Mediation Committee is still working to bring lasting peace to the two traditional Areas.

2006 marked the 30th anniversary of the installation of the Bishop in Ho and the public declaration of Ho as the Episcopal See of Keta-Ho Diocese.

== Recognition ==
Lodonu was awarded the Order of the Volta by the Government of Ghana on 1 July 2006 for distinguishing himself in the Christian Religion.
