= Young Professionals in Foreign Policy =

- Abbreviation: YPFP
- Formation: 2004; 22 years ago
- Type: Non-partisan, public policy nonprofit organization
- Headquarters: Washington, DC
- Location: Washington, District of Columbia, U.S.
- Global Executive Director: Aubrey Cox Ottenstein
- Website: ypfp.org

Young Professionals in Foreign Policy (YPFP) is a United States nonprofit, nonpartisan organization that works to train the next generation of foreign policy leadership. The group was founded by Joshua Marcuse in 2004.

== Membership ==
YPFP's membership spans 80 countries and a network of over 20,000 young professionals active in the field of foreign policy. Members are screened and selected from a broader pool of applicants and each pay membership dues to support organizational programming and services. Members are drawn from a variety of global institutions, government agencies, nonprofits, media groups, graduate programs, and corporations that span a diverse array of sectors.

== Chapters ==
Washington D.C., London, Brussels, New York, San Francisco, Toronto, and Tokyo comprise YPFP's core branches, while hubs in Rome and Tel Aviv provide a global network of interconnection and dialogue.

== Discussion groups ==
YPFP's discussion groups are peer-led communities within YPFP that offer selected members an opportunity to connect with other young professionals who share a depth of experience in a particular region or subject. Discussion groups involve issues around Africa, Arabic Language, Chinese Language, Combating Terrorism, Cybersecurity Policy & Technology, Defense, East Asia, Energy & Environment, Europe & Eurasia, French Language, Gender in Foreign Policy, Grand Strategy, Human Rights, Intelligence and Information Warfare, International Development, International Trade & Finance, Latin America, Middle East, Nuclear Weapons, Russian Language, South Asia, and Spanish Language.

== Fellowship program ==
The fellowship program at YPFP is an eight-month fellowship designed to give future leaders in foreign policy the skills they will need to succeed throughout their careers. Fellows develop their expertise by writing regular articles for a variety of national and international media outlets, such as The Hill, Diplomatic Courier, and Real Clear Politics. Fellows specialize in a specific region or a specific issue area.

YPFP also receives grant funding for projects from foundations across the United States.

== Charged Affairs ==
Charged Affairs is the flagship publication of YPFP and a showcase of perspectives by rising leaders in foreign policy. It is a journal designed to give young professionals a chance to hone their writing and analytical skills by participating in a rigorous editorial process and to present articles to the broader foreign policy community.
