= The Diplomatic Courier =

English-language international news magazine

- Type: Online and print
- Format: Magazine
- Publisher: Medauras Global, LLC
- Editor: Ana Carcani Rold
- Founded: 2006; 20 years ago
- Headquarters: Washington, D.C.
- Circulation: Global
- Website: diplomaticourier.com

The Diplomatic Courier is an English-language global news and international affairs analysis magazine based in Washington, D.C. It publishes six print issues per year. Its focus is on developments in diplomacy, conflict resolution, international affairs, and rule of law, as well as concepts and theories from a wide variety of related disciplines.

== History ==
The Diplomatic Courier was founded in 2006 by Ana Carcani Rold, its first editor-in-chief. The print magazine published four issues per year from 2006 to 2010, five issues in 2011, and six issues per year from 2012 to the present.

== Leadership ==
- Ana C. Rold, Founder and CEO
- Shane Szarkowski, Editor-in-Chief

== Special features ==
=== The Top 99 Under 33 ===
In the Summer 2011 issue, the Diplomatic Courier launched "The Top 99 Under 33" list, listing the 99 most influential foreign policy professionals under 33. The Top 99 were chosen through an initial nominations process, and from there a board consisting of members of the networking group, Young Professionals in Foreign Policy (YPFP), and editors of The Diplomatic Courier chose the Top 99 and whom to honor as the Top 9. In 2012 and 2013, the "Diplomatic Courier" continued the lists, each time choosing candidates from an open nominations process.

=== Global Go-To Think Tanks of 2011 ===
In the January 2012 issue, the Diplomatic Courier partnered with the Think Tanks and Civil Societies Program (TTCSP) to produce the 2011 Global Go-To Think Tank Report, launching the report at the National Press Club (USA). The approach of James McGann, director of the TTCSP, to the study and assessment of think tanks has been criticised by think tank researchers such as Enrique Mendizabal and Goran Buldioski, director of the Think Tank Fund, supported by the Open Society Institute.
