= Francis Bomansaan =

Ghanaian Catholic prelate (born 1962)

The Most Reverend Francis Bomansaan
- Bishop of Wa, Ghana
- Church: Catholic Church
- Archdiocese: Roman Catholic Archdiocese of Tamale
- See: Roman Catholic Diocese of Wa
- Appointed: 22 May 2024
- Installed: 2 August 2024
- Predecessor: Richard Kuuia Baawobr
- Successor: Incumbent

Orders
- Ordination: 27 July 1991
- Consecration: 2 August 1924 by Philip Naameh
- Rank: Bishop

Personal details
- Born: Francis Bomansaan; 19 January 1962 Kaleo, Diocese of Wa, Upper West Region, Ghana
- Motto: "Totus tuus ego sum, Domine" (I am entirely yours, Lord)

Styles of Francis Bomansaan
- Reference style: Your Lordship; The Most Reverend
- Spoken style: His Lordship
- Religious style: Bishop

Francis Bomansaan M.Afr. (born 19 January 1962) is a Ghanaian Catholic prelate who is the Bishop of the Roman Catholic Diocese of Wa in the Metropolitan Ecclesiastical Province of Tamale in Ghana. He was appointed bishop by Pope Francis on 22 May 2024. Before that, from 27 July 1991, until he was appointed bishop, he was a priest of the Catholic Religious order of the Missionaries of Africa (M.Afr.). He was consecrated as bishop and installed at Wa, Ghana on 22 May 2024.

== Background and education ==
He was born on 19 January 1962 at Kaleo, Diocese of Wa, Upper West Region, in northwestern Ghana. He became a member of the Order of the Missionaries of Africa (White Fathers) in 1983. He took his perpetual wows for that religious society on 7 December 1990. He holds a diploma in Ignatian Spirituality, from the Jesuits Centre in Liverpool, England. His Master of Arts in psycho-spirituality and counselling was awarded by an institution in Chicago, Illinois, United States. He also studied at the Saint Anselm Institute in London and at the Religious Formation Ministry Programme, from Loreto House, Dublin, Ireland.

== Priest ==
On 7 December 1990 he took his perpetual vows of the Society of the White Fathers. He was ordained a priest of that Catholic religious Order on 27 July 1991. He served as a priest until 22 May 2024.

As a priest, he served in various roles and locations, including as:

- Parish priest of the Archdiocese of Mbeya, Tanzania from 1991 until 1993.
- Director of vocational animation and formator in Lublin, Poland from 1995 until 1998.
- Vocational director of the Missionaries of Africa in Ghana and Nigeria from 1999 until 2003.
- First advisor to the provincial superior of M.Afr. for Ghana and Nigeria from 1999 until 2003.
- Formator and bursar of Saint Edward College, London from 2004 until 2005.
- Provincial superior of the province of Ghana and Nigeria of M.Afr. from 2005 until 2011.
- Master of novices at the International English-Speaking Novitiate, Zambia from 2012 until 2019.
- Head of the Addiction Rehabilitation Centre, Kenya from 2021 until 2022.
- Deputy superior general of the Missionaries of Africa from 2022 until 2022.

== Bishop ==
Pope Francis appointed him Bishop of the Roman Catholic Diocese of Wa on 22 May 2024. He was consecrated and installed at Wa on 2 August 2024. The Principal Consecrator was Archbishop Philip Naameh, Archbishop of Tamale assisted by Bishop Paul Bemile, Bishop Emeritus of Wa and Bishop Matthew Kwasi Gyamfi, Bishop of Sunyani.

== See also ==
- Catholic Church in Ghana

== Succession table ==
Catholic Church titles
Preceded by Richard Kuuia Baawobr (17 February 2016 - 27 November 2022)	Bishop of Wa (since 22 May 2024)	Succeeded by Incumbent
