= Matthew Yitiereh =

Ghanaian Catholic prelate (born in 1961)

The Most Reverend Matthew Yitiereh
- Bishop of Yendi, Ghana
- Church: Catholic Church
- Archdiocese: Roman Catholic Archdiocese of Tamale
- See: Roman Catholic Diocese of Yendi
- Appointed: 3 June 2022
- Installed: 20 August 2022
- Predecessor: Vincent Sowah Boi-Nai
- Successor: Incumbent

Orders
- Ordination: 22 July 1995
- Consecration: 20 August 2022 by Cardinal Peter Kodwo Appiah Turkson
- Rank: Bishop

Personal details
- Born: Matthew Yitiereh; 1 January 1961 (age 64) Nandom Pina, Diocese of Wa, Upper West Region, Ghana

Styles of Matthew Yitiereh
- Reference style: Your Lordship; The Most Reverend
- Spoken style: His Lordship
- Religious style: Bishop

Matthew Yitiereh (born 1 January 1961) is a Ghanaian Catholic prelate who is the bishop of the Roman Catholic Diocese of Yendi in Ghana, since 3 June 2022. Before that, from 22 July 1995 until he was appointed bishop, he was a Catholic priest of the Roman Catholic Archdiocese of Tamale. He was appointed bishop by Pope Francis. He was consecrated and installed at Yendi, on 20 August 2022.

== Background and education ==
Matthew Yitiereh was born on 1 January 1961 at Nandom Pina, Upper West Region, Diocese of Wa, in northwestern Ghana. He studied at Saint Francis Xavier Minor Seminary in Wa. He then transferred to Saint Hubert Seminary Senior High in Kumasi. He concluded his seminary studies at Saint Victor's Major Seminary in Tamale. Later, he graduated with a Master's degree in Theology, with specialization in pastoral liturgy from an institution in Ireland, where he studied from 2002 until 2004.

== Priest ==
On 22 July 1995, he was ordained a priest of the Roman Catholic Archdiocese of Tamale. He served as priest until 3 June 2022.

While a priest, he served in various roles and locations, including as:

- Parish priest of Holy Spirit in Chamba from 1995 until 1997.
- Parish priest of Saints Peter and Paul from 1998 until 2003.
- Director of diocesan youth ministry from 1998 until 2003.
- Studies leading to the award of a Master of Theology degree with specialization in pastoral liturgy in Ireland from 2002 until 2004.
- Master of diocesan celebrations of the Tamale Institute of Cross-Cultural Studies in 2004.
- Chairman of the administration board of the Tamale Institute of Cross-Cultural Studies in 2004.
- Administrator of the Cathedral of the Annunciation in Tamale from 2004 until 2015.
- President of the Tamale Archdiocese Priests' Association from 2015 until 2022.
- Vicar general of the metropolitan archdiocese of Tamale from 2016 until 2022.
- Parish priest of the Blessed Sacrament Church, Archdiocese of Tamale from 2016 until 2022.

== As bishop ==
On 3 June 2022, Pope Francis appointed Reverend Matthew Yitiereh, previously the vicar general of the metropolitan archdiocese of Tamale, as bishop of the diocese of Yendi, Ghana. He succeeded Bishop Vincent Sowah Boi-Nai, whose age-related retirement was approved, effective that same day.

He was consecrated and installed at Yendi on 20 August 2022 by Cardinal Peter Kodwo Appiah Turkson, Cardinal-Priest of San Liborio assisted by Archbishop Philip Naameh, Archbishop of Tamale and Archbishop Henryk Mieczysław Jagodziński, Titular Archbishop of Limosano. Cardinal-Elect Richard Kuuia Baawobr was also a Co-Consecrator, although not a principal.

== See also ==
- Catholic Church in Ghana

== Succession table ==
Catholic Church titles
Preceded by Vincent Sowah Boi-Nai (16 March 1999 - 3 June 2022)	Bishop of Yendi (since 3 June 2022)	Succeeded by Incumbent
