= Peter Paul Yelezuome Angkyier =

Ghanaian Catholic prelate (born 1961)

The Most Reverend Peter Paul Yelezuome Angkyier
- Bishop of Damongo, Ghana
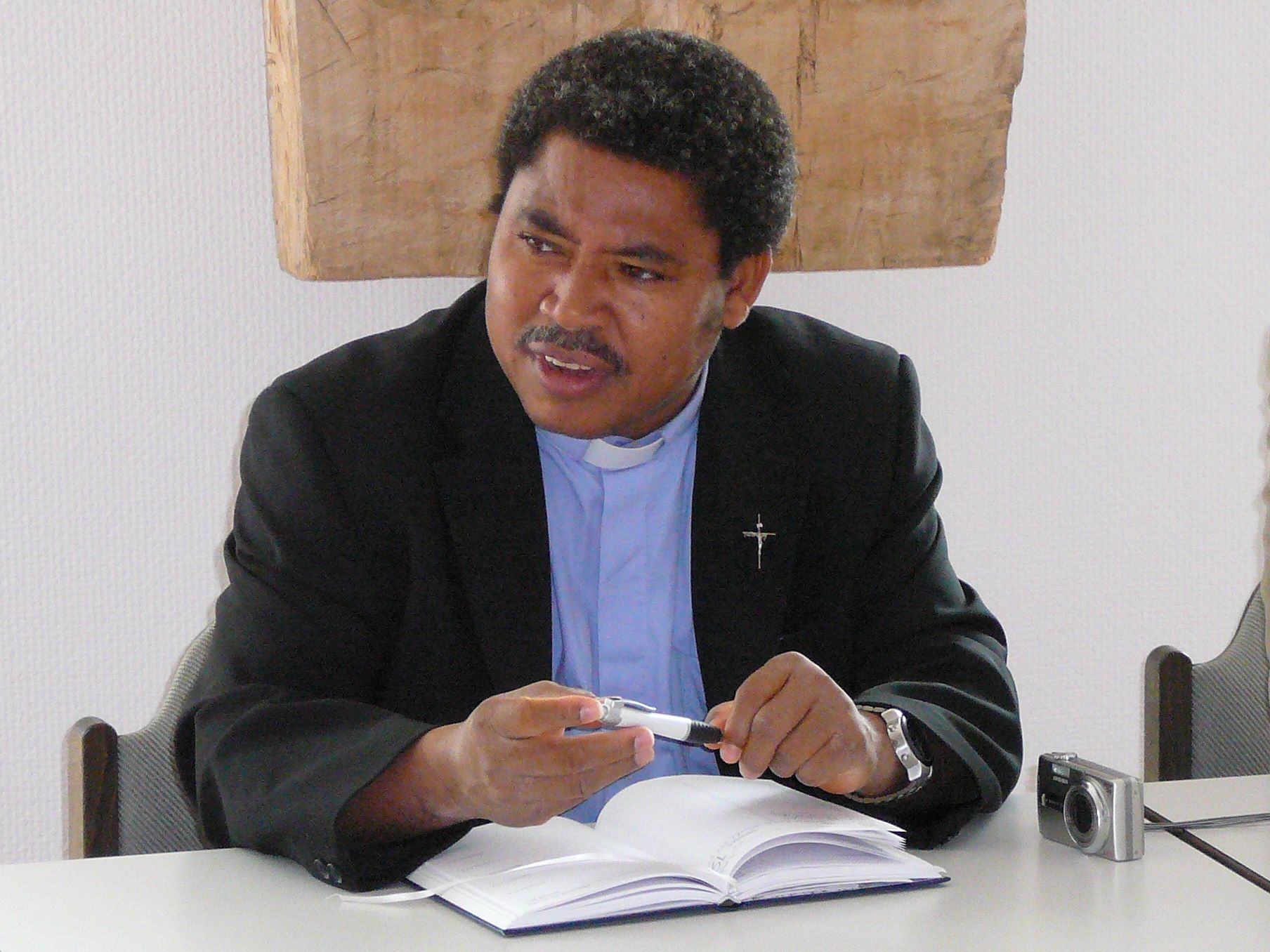
- Bishop Peter Paul Yelezuome Angkyier
- Church: Catholic Church
- Archdiocese: Roman Catholic Archdiocese of Tamale
- See: Roman Catholic Diocese of Damongo
- Appointed: 17 December 2010
- Installed: 25 March 2011
- Predecessor: Philip Naameh
- Successor: Incumbent

Orders
- Ordination: 15 August 1992
- Consecration: 25 March 2011 by Philip Naameh
- Rank: Bishop

Personal details
- Born: Peter Paul Yelezuome Angkyier; 26 November 1961 (age 64) Nandom, Diocese of Wa, Upper West Region, Ghana

Styles of Peter Paul Yelezuome Angkyier
- Reference style: Your Lordship; The Most Reverend
- Spoken style: His Lordship
- Religious style: Bishop

Peter Paul Yelezuome Angkyier (born 26 November 1961) is a Ghanaian Catholic prelate who is the bishop of the Roman Catholic Diocese of Damongo in Ghana since 17 December 2010. Before that, from 15 August 1992 until he was appointed bishop, he was a priest of the Roman Catholic Archdiocese of Tamale. He was consecrated and installed at Damongo, Ghana on 25 March 2011.

== Background and education ==
Peter Paul Yelezuome Angkyier was born on 26 November 1961 in Nandom, Upper West Region, in the Diocese of Wa, a suffragan of the Archdiocese of Tamale, in northwest Ghana. From 1977 until 1984, he studied at Saint Charles Minor Seminary in Tamale. He then studied philosophy and theology at Saint Victor's Major Seminary in Tamale. Later, he graduated with an advanced degree in "religious psychology" from the Pontifical Gregorian University in Rome, Italy.

== Priest ==
He was ordained a priest of the Archdiocese of Tamale on 15 August 1992. When the Catholic Diocese of Damongo was created in 1995, he was incardinated in the new diocese on 3 February 1995. He served as a priest until 17 December 2010.

As a priest, he served in many roles and locations, including as:

- Assistant priest in the Uganda Martyrs Parish in Bole from 1992 until 1993.
- Pastor of the Saint Anne Parish from 1993 until 1994.
- Chaplain for the African students in the Archdiocese of Vienna, Austria from 1994 until 1996.
- Studies for the Degree in Religious Psychology at the Gregorian University in Rome from 1996 until 2000.
- Teacher and Spiritual Director at the St Augustine Major Seminary in Tamale from 2000 until 2003.
- Vicar General of Damongo Catholic Diocese from 2002 until 2009.
- Professor at the Saint Augustine Major Seminary in Tamale, in Ghana from 2002 until 2009.

== Bishop ==
On 17 December 2010 , The Holy Father Pope Benedict XVI appointed him Bishop of the Diocese of Damongo. He was consecrated bishop and installed at Damongo on 25 March 2011 by the hands of Archbishop Philip Naameh, Archbishop of Tamale assisted by Bishop Paul Bemile, Bishop of Wa and Bishop Gabriel Justice Yaw Anokye, Bishop of Obuasi. While bishop, he served as the chairman of the Ghana Prisons Council. He continues to serve as the Local Ordinary of the diocese of Damongo as of 2023.

== See also ==
- Catholic Church in Ghana

== Succession table ==
Preceded by Philip Naameh (3 February 1995 - 12 February 2009)	Bishop of Damongo, (since 17 December 2010)	Succeeded by Incumbent
