= Damongo =

Regional capital of Savannah Region, Ghana

Damongo Demanwu
- Regional capital
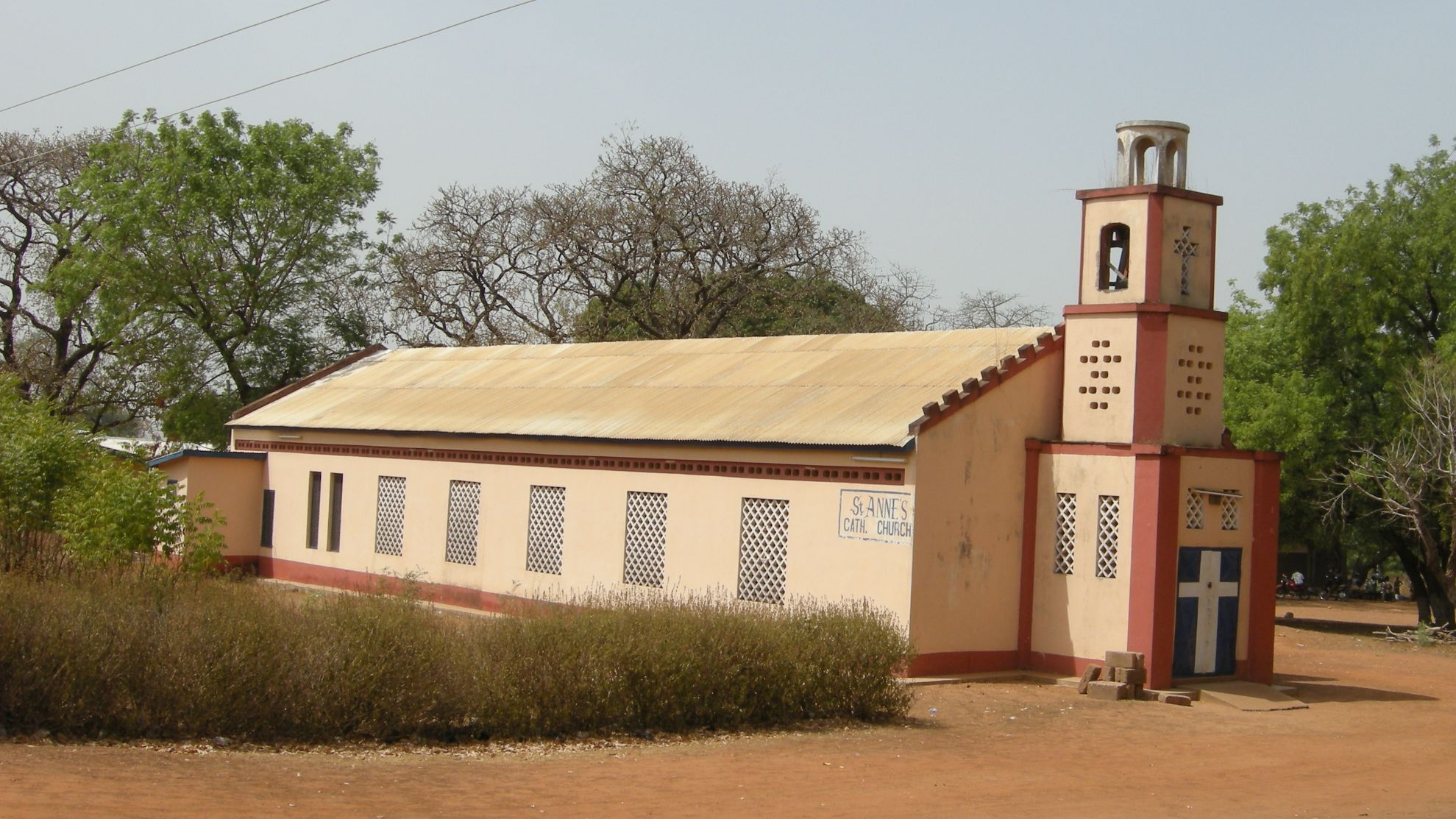
- St Anne's Catholic Cathedral

- Location of Damongo in Savannah Region
- Coordinates: 9°05′N 1°49′W
- Country: Ghana
- Region: Savannah Region
- Municipal: West Gonja Municipal
- Elevation: 712 ft (217 m)

Population (2000)
  - Total: 14,442
- Time zone: GMT
  - Summer (DST): GMT
- postal code: N5

Damongo is a town and the capital of West Gonja Municipal, Ghana. It was declared the capital of the Savannah Region on 12 February 2019. Damongo is home to Bikunuto Jewu Soale I, the paramount chief of the Gonja Kingdom. The languages spoken in Damongo include Gonja, Vagla, Hanga, Brifor (Lobi), Dagaare, Waale, Frafra, Kasim, Twi, Ewe, and Hausa.

== History ==
The seat of the Gonja Kingdom was moved from Nyange to Damongo in 1944 by Yagbonwura Awusi Ewuntomah Bunyangso, who ruled from 1942 to 1975. At that time, Damongo was a small community with less than ten households. Nevertheless, it became the focal point of Gonja's leadership and heritage.

During the colonial era, Damongo played a vital role as an administrative center for the colonial government. Its strategic location facilitated communication and trade between the northern and southern parts of the country.

== Economy ==
Although Damongo is classified as urban, much of its population still heavily relies on agriculture. The primary crops cultivated include cash crops such as corn, millet, cassava, cashew, yams, okra, and groundnuts. In some regions of Damongo, upland rice is also grown.

Shea nuts are sourced from wild trees, and they serve both as a food source and as raw material for the production of oils and cosmetics through refinement processes. The traditional agricultural practices and cultivation of these crops continue to play a vital role in the community's sustenance and economic activities.

== Education ==
Damongo is the educational hub of the region. Aside from the many basic schools, Damongo has three senior high schools: the Damongo Senior High School (Dass), Ndewura Jakpa Secondary Technical High School (Ndesco), and St. Anne's Girls Senior High School (Sagiss). There is also the Damongo Agricultural College and the Damongo Health Assistant School.

== Issues ==
There are a lot of problems plaguing the town, preventing further development in the region.

=== Water crisis ===
Damongo (and surrounding areas) have been dealing with access to clean water since being settled. Residents have resorted to hand digging wells and boreholes included with hand pumps to receive water. The municipality, with help from the Government of Ghana, plans to begin work on a water system that would provide safe drinking water to the whole community.

=== Lack of infrastructure ===
The lack of proper infrastructure has led to an increase in crime in the town and a lack of protection from floods. The increase in crime could be blame for the lack of functioning street lights, which leads to an increase in car crashes.

== Notable people ==
- Mutawakilu Adam, former member of Parliament for Damango Constituency
- Peter Paul Yelezuome Angkyier, bishop of the Catholic Diocese of Damongo
- John Dramani Mahama, 12th & 14th president of Ghana
- Alban Bagbin, speaker of Parliament
- Benjamin Kunbuor, former minister of defence
- Michael Abu Sakara Foster, former presidential candidate of CPP
- John Abdulai Jinapor, member of Parliament for Yapei-Kusawgu Constituency
- Samuel Abu Jinapor, member of Parliament for Damango Constituency

== See also ==
- Jakpa Palace
- Larabanga
- Roman Catholic Diocese of Damongo
