= Gregory Eebolawola Kpiebaya =

Catholic Roman Catholic prelate (1933–2022)

The Most Reverend Gregory Eebolawola Kpiebaya
- Archbishop Emeritus of Tamale
- Diocese: Tamale
- Appointed: 26 March 1994
- Term ended: 12 February 2009
- Predecessor: Peter Poreku Dery
- Successor: Philip Naameh
- Previous post: Bishop of Wa (1974–1994)

Orders
- Ordination: 8 September 1962
- Consecration: 15 March 1975 by Peter Poreku Dery

Personal details
- Born: 1933 Kaleo, Gold Coast
- Died: 31 May 2022 (aged 89) Tamale, Ghana

Gregory Eebolawola Kpiebaya (1933 – 31 May 2022) was a Ghanaian Roman Catholic prelate. He was bishop of Wa from 1974 to 1994 and archbishop of Tamale from 1994 to 2009.

Catholic Church titles
Preceded by Peter Poreku Dery	Archbishop of Tamale; 1994–2009	Succeeded by Philip Naameh
Preceded by Peter Poreku Dery	Bishop of Wa; 1974–1994	Succeeded by Paul Bemile
