= Vincent Boi-Nai =

Ghanaian Catholic bishop

Vincent Boi-Nai SVD
- Bishop Emeritus of Yendi
- Church: Catholic Church
- Diocese: Diocese of Yendi
- In office: 16 March 1999 – 3 June 2022
- Predecessor: Diocese erected
- Successor: Matthew Yitiereh

Orders
- Ordination: 13 August 1977
- Consecration: 10 July 1999 by Peter Porekuu Dery

Personal details
- Born: 1 January 1945 (age 81) Labadi, Gold Coast, British Empire

Vincent Sowah Boi-Nai (born 1945) is a Ghanaian Catholic prelate who was the Bishop of Yendi from 1999 - 2022.
