= François Bustillo =

French Catholic prelate of Spanish origin

His Eminence François Bustillo OFM Conv.
- Cardinal; Bishop of Ajaccio
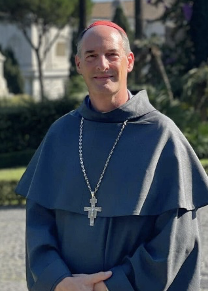
- Church: Catholic Church
- Diocese: Ajaccio
- Appointed: 11 May 2021
- Installed: 13 June 2021
- Predecessor: Olivier de Germay
- Other post: Cardinal Priest of Santa Maria Immacolata di Lourdes a Boccea (2023-)

Orders
- Ordination: 10 September 1994
- Consecration: 13 June 2021 by Jean-Marc Aveline
- Created cardinal: 30 September 2023 by Pope Francis
- Rank: Cardinal Priest

Personal details
- Born: Francisco-Javier Bustillo Rípodas; 23 November 1968 (age 57) Pamplona, Spain
- Education: Catholic University of Toulouse
- Motto: In Ipso vita erat (In Him was life)
- Coat of arms

François-Xavier Bustillo OFM Conv. (born 23 November 1968), known as François Bustillo, (Note: The website of his diocese calls him "François Bustillo" and he has used this shortened form of his name for all his published books. He is often referred to by that name on Church websites and in other media.) is a Spanish-born French Catholic prelate who has served as Bishop of Ajaccio since 2021. He is a member of the Conventual Franciscans and has spent his priesthood in France. Pope Francis made him a cardinal on 30 September 2023.

== Biography ==
He was born Francisco Javier Bustillo Rípodas on 23 November 1968 in Pamplona in Navarre, Spain, the eldest of four children. His father was a career soldier. He had several relatives who had religious vocations. When barely ten years old he chose to attend the seminary in Baztan, Navarre, rather than the school in his hometown. At age 17 he joined the Order of Friars Minor Conventual in Padua, Italy, where he completed his work in philosophy and theology at the Istituto Teologico Sant'Antonio Dottore. He earned a licentiate in Sacred Theology at the Catholic University of Toulouse in 1997. He professed his vows as a Franciscan on 20 September 1992 and was ordained a priest on 10 September 1994. He later said he took his vows and was ordained in Spain for his family's sake: "Otherwise they would have killed me."

In 1994 he was one of the Conventual Friars Minor who reestablished the Convent of Saint Bonaventure in Narbonne, France, which was founded in 1260 and abandoned in 1934. Their mission was to evangelize a region that had been de-Christianized. From 2006 to 2018 he was Provincial Custos of the Conventual Franciscans for France and Belgium, and from 2005 to 2018 carried out his ministry in the diocese of Carcassonne-Narbonne, serving as a parish priest, as a member of the diocesan council from 2007 to 2018, as episcopal vicar for a region of the diocese, and as diocesan delegate for new spirituality movements and for interreligious dialogue from 2012 to 2018. From 2018 to 2021 he was appointed guardian of the convent of Saint-Maximilien-Kolbe in Lourdes, France. In October 2019, he was named episcopal delegate for the protection of minors and the vulnerable for the Diocese of Tarbes-et-Lourdes. He has said he enjoyed assignments that kept him on the move and preferred the challenge presented by France rather than working in Italy or Spain which would have been "too easy".

He became a naturalized French citizen on 31 October 2006.

On 11 May 2021, Pope Francis appointed him Bishop of Ajaccio. He told his new Corsican audience that he would have to learn how to detach himself from the Franciscan family that had formed him and discover a new life. He said Corsica like his native Navarre was a country with "strong, deep cultural roots." and added: "I do not come with a program and projects.... I come with ideas, desires, and a will to build a solid ecclesiastical life." He received his episcopal consecration on 13 June in the cathedral in Ajaccio from Jean-Marc Aveline, Archbishop of Marseilles.

In February 2022, after Paris-Match reported that Bustillo was one of the leading candidates for the position of Archbishop of Paris, he said he had not been contacted and that it was not Church practice to move a bishop so soon. It said it would be "unfair": "Paris needs a man of experience. What I really want is to be here, with you and for you."

In April 2022, Pope Francis gave an Italian-language version of Bustillo's book Witnesses, Not Officials (Note: It was originally published in French as La Vocation du prêtre face aux crises. La fidélité créatrice. The Italian translation was called Testimoni, non funzionari. Il sacerdote dentro il cambiamento d'epoca.) to each of the priests attending the Chrism Mass in St. Peter's Basilica on Holy Thursday.

On 9 July 2023, Pope Francis announced he planned to make him a cardinal at a consistory scheduled for 30 September. The first phone call to congratulate him came from Cardinal Dominique Mamberti, a Corsican who spent his entire career in Rome. Bustillo is the first bishop of his diocese to be named a cardinal. (Note: In the 17th century, Giovanni Stefano Donghi was already a cardinal when named bishop of Ajaccio.) At that consistory he was made cardinal priest of Santa Maria Immacolata di Lourdes a Boccea. On 4 October 2023 he was named a member of the Dicastery for the Clergy.

In September 2023, the French Catholic magazine Golias described the charismatic activities and "misguided mysticism" of Franciscan Brother Daniel-Marie Thévenet as "bordering on charlatanism". It questioned Bustillo's association with Thévenet, both rooted in the Conventual Franciscan community of Cholet and Brussels. Bustillo, who had once been Thevenet's superior, said there were no complaints against him then. Now he had no authority over him and could only urge Thevenet to be prudent. (Note: Golias deemed Bustillo's response far short of what Thévenet's behavior deserved.)

On 29 August 2024, Bustillo was made a knight (chevalier) of the French Legion of Honor.

Bustillo spent the day at Pope Francis' side when he visited Ajaccio on 15 December 2024 to address a symposium on Popular Religiosity in the Mediterranean. Bustillo was described as "media-savvy" for his organization of the visit and Le Monde noted how he curated the image of Corsica he wanted the world to see–"good-natured and sunny" with "babies brandished to be blessed by the pope", "flocks of the faithful who knew the words to the songs", and "pilgrims who came with picnics in their backpacks"–in contrast to the celebrities who gathered in rainy Paris a week earlier to celebrate the reopening of Notre Dame.

Bustillo participated as a cardinal elector in the 2025 papal conclave that elected Pope Leo XIV.

== Publications ==
- La fraternità pasquale. Raccontare la vita comunitaria, in Memoria e profezia, EMP, 2013, ISBN 978-8825033953
- La vocation du prêtre face aux crises: La fidélité créatrice, Bruyères-le-Châtel, Éditions Nouvelle Cité, 2021, ISBN 978-2-37582-242-5
  - Testimoni, non funzionari. Il sacerdote dentro il cambiamento d'epoca, Libreria Editrice Vaticana, 2022 ISBN 978-8826607078
- Co-authored with Archbishop Edgar Peña Parra, with a preface by Pope Francis, Le coeur ne se divise pas, Fayard, 2023, ISBN 978-2213726014

== See also ==
- Cardinals created by Francis

== Notes ==
Catholic Church titles
Preceded by Olivier de Germay	Bishop of Ajaccio; 2021–	Incumbent
Preceded by Richard Baawobr	Cardinal Priest of Santa Maria Immacolata di Lourdes a Boccea; 2023–	Incumbent
