= Diocese of Yendi =

Roman Catholic diocese in Ghana

Coordinates: 9.4448°N 0.0167°W

Diocese of Yendi Dioecesis Yendensis
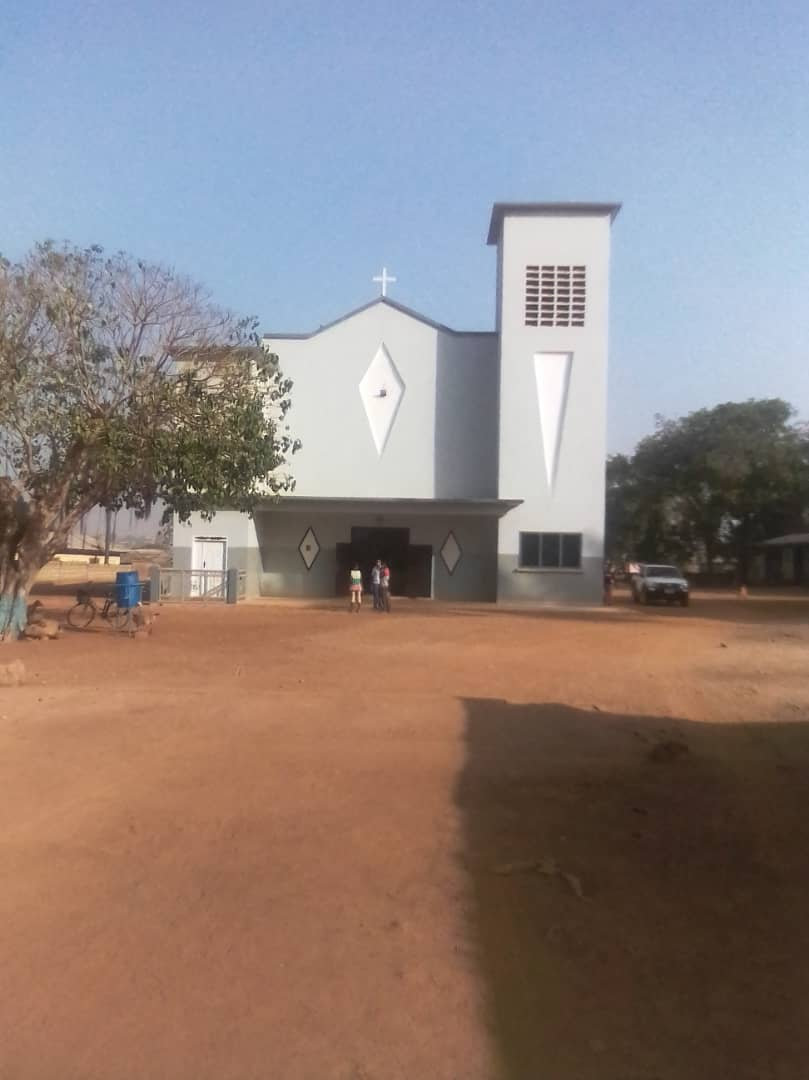

Location
- Country: Ghana
- Metropolitan: Tamale

Statistics
- Area: 19,160 km^{2} (7,400 sq mi)
- Population: Total; Catholics: (as of 2004); 625,603; 6,847 (1.1%)

Information
- Rite: Latin Rite

Current leadership
- Pope: Leo XIV
- Bishop: Matthew Yitiereh
- Bishops emeritus: Vincent Sowah Boi-Nai, S.V.D.

The Roman Catholic Diocese of Yendi (Latin: Yenden(sis)) is a diocese located in the city of Yendi in the ecclesiastical province of Tamale in Ghana.

== History ==
- March 16, 1999: Established as Diocese of Yendi from the Metropolitan Archdiocese of Tamale

== Special churches ==
The Cathedral is the Cathedral of Our Lady of Lourdes in Yendi.

== Leadership ==
- Bishops of Yendi (Roman rite)
  - Bishop Vincent Sowah Boi-Nai, S.V.D. (1999- 2022)
  - Bishop Matthew Yitiereh (2022–present)

== See also ==
- Roman Catholicism in Ghana

== Sources ==
- GCatholic.org
- Catholic Hierarchy
