= Jakpa Palace =

Palace in Damongo, Ghana

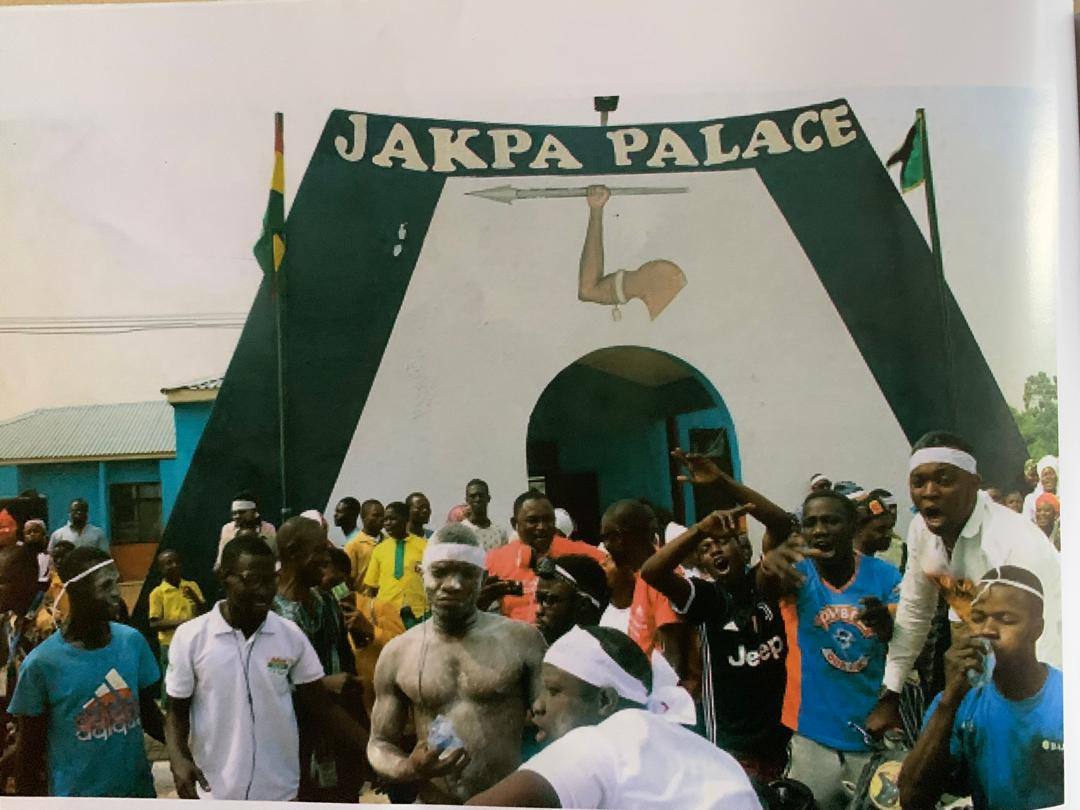
The Jakpa Palace

The Ndewura Jakpa Palace is the seat of the Yagbonwura, as well as his official residence and meeting area. It is located at Damongo, the capital of the Savannah Region in Ghana.

== History ==
One of the initial two palaces was built in the 1970s.

== Architecture ==
The palace is of Malian architectural designs.

== Renovation ==
In April 2024, John Mahama cut the sod for the rebuild of the palace for the overlord of the Gonjas in Ghana.
