= Paul Bemile =

Ghanaian Catholic prelate (born 1939)

The Most Reverend Paul Bemile
- Bishop of Wa, Ghana
- Church: Catholic Church
- Archdiocese: Roman Catholic Archdiocese of Tamale
- See: Roman Catholic Diocese of Wa
- Appointed: 19 December 1994
- Installed: 17 February 2016
- Predecessor: Gregory Eebolawola Kpiebaya
- Successor: Richard Kuuia Baawobr

Orders
- Ordination: 3 August 1968
- Consecration: 25 March 1995 by Peter Poreku Dery
- Rank: Bishop

Personal details
- Born: Paul Bemile; 20 December 1939 (age 86) Kokoligu, Diocese of Wa, Upper West Region, Ghana

Styles of Paul Bemile
- Reference style: Your Lordship; The Most Reverend
- Spoken style: His Lordship
- Religious style: Bishop

Paul Bemile (born 20 December 1939) is a Ghanaian Catholic prelate who was the Bishop of the Roman Catholic Diocese of Wa in the Metropolitan Ecclesiastical Province of Tamale in Ghana. He was appointed bishop by Pope John Paul II on 19 December 1994. He was consecrated as bishop and installed at Wa, Ghana on 25 March 1995. On 17 February 2016, Pope Francis accepted his related retirement request. He lives on as Bishop Emeritus of Wa, Ghana.

== Background and priesthood ==
Paul Bemile was born on 20 December 1939 at Kokoligu, Diocese of Wa, Upper West Region, in northwestern Ghana. He studied philosophy and theology at seminary. He was ordained a priest of the Catholic Diocese of Wa on 3 August 1968. He served as a priest until 19 December 1994.

== Bishop ==
Pope John Paul II appointed him Bishop of the Roman Catholic Diocese of Wa on 19 Dec 1994. He was consecrated and installed at Wa on 25 March 1995. The Principal Consecrator was Archbishop Peter Poreku Dery, Archbishop Emeritus of Tamale assisted by Archbishop Gregory Eebolawola Kpiebaya, Archbishop of Tamale and Archbishop Dominic Kodwo Andoh, Archbishop of Accra. While bishop, he bemoaned the use of violence to settle political differences. He also served as the chairman of the Governance, Justice and Peace Commission (GJPC). He also served as a member of the Governing Council of the African Peer Review Mechanism (APRM) and member of the Pontifical Council for Interreligious Dialogue, in Rome, Italy.

On 17 February 2016, Pope Francis accepted the age-related resignation of Bishop Paul Bemile of the Diocese of Wa. The Holy Father appointed Richard Kuuia Baawobr as the new bishop at Wa, effective that day.

== See also ==
- Catholic Church in Ghana

== Succession table ==
Catholic Church titles
Preceded by Gregory Eebolawola Kpiebaya (18 November 1974 - 26 March 1994)	Bishop of Wa (19 December 1994 - 17 February 2016)	Succeeded by Richard Kuuia Baawobr (17 February 2016 - 27 November 2022)
