= Diocese of Wa =

Roman Catholic diocese in Ghana

Coordinates: 10.0618°N 2.5005°W

Diocese of Wa Dioecesis Vaensis
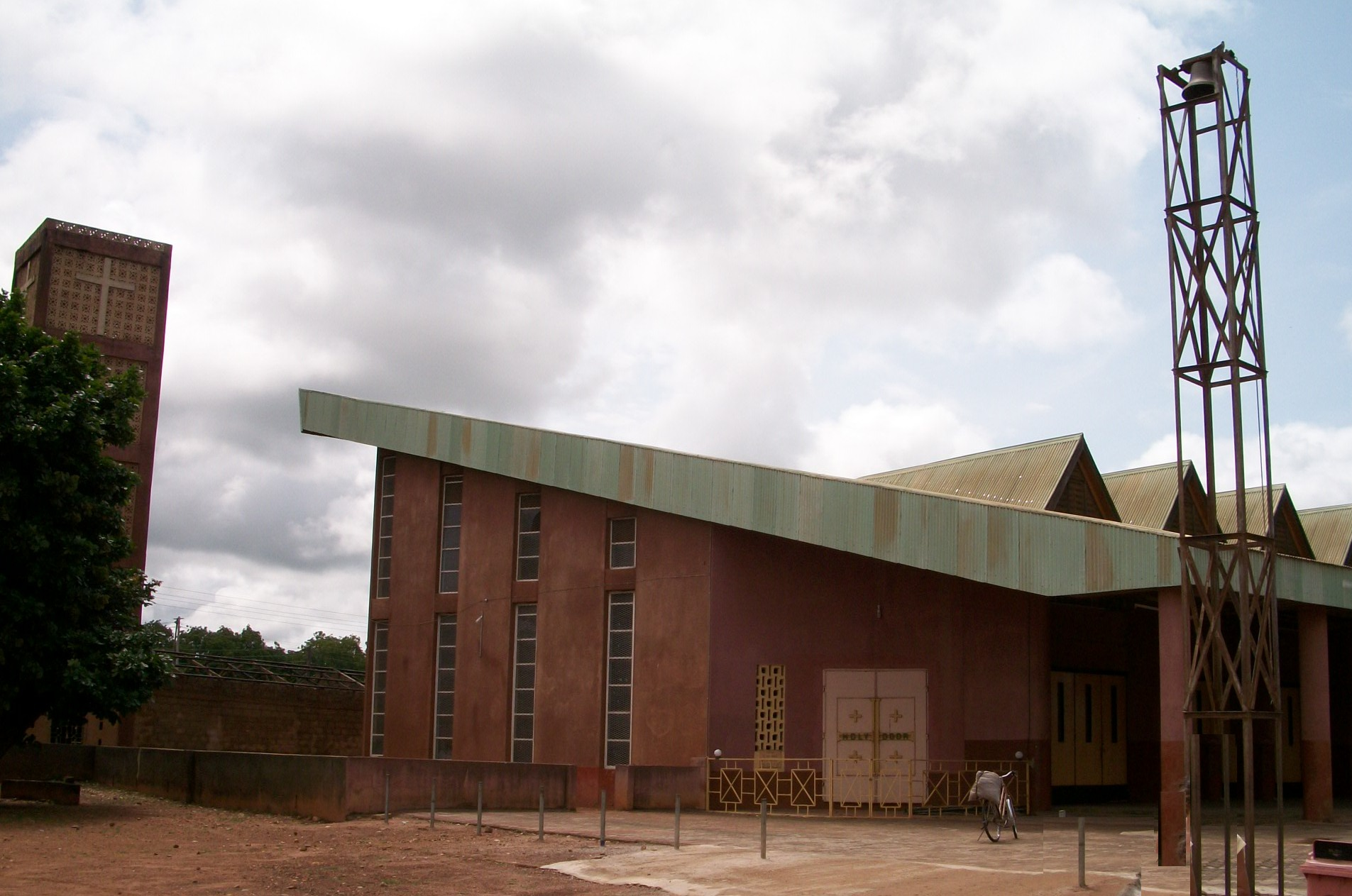
- Cathedral of Saint Andrew, Wa

Location
- Country: Ghana
- Metropolitan: Tamale

Statistics
- Area: 18,476 km^{2} (7,134 sq mi)
- Population: Total; Catholics: (as of 2014); 829,000; 343,240 (41.4%)

Information
- Rite: Latin Rite

Current leadership
- Pope: Leo XIV
- Bishop: Francis Bomansaan
- Bishops emeritus: Richard Kuuia Baawobr; Paul Bemile

The Roman Catholic Diocese of Wa (Latin: Vaën(sis)) is a diocese located in the city of Wa in the ecclesiastical province of Tamale in Ghana.

== History ==
- November 3, 1959: Established as the Diocese of Wa from the Diocese of Tamale

== Special churches ==
The Cathedral is St. Andrew’s Cathedral in Wa and there is also St. Theresa's Minor basilica in Nandom

== Leadership ==
Bishops of Wa

- Bishop Peter Poreku Dery (1960.03.16 – 1974.11.18), appointed Bishop of Tamale; future Archbishop and Cardinal
- Bishop Gregory Eebolawola Kpiebaya (1974.11.18 – 1994.03.26), appointed Archbishop of Tamale
- Bishop Paul Bemile (1994.12.19 - 2016.02.17)
- Bishop Richard Baawobr (2016.02.17 - 2022.11.27), made a Cardinal in August 2022
- Bishop Francis Bomansaan (since 22 May 2024)

== See also ==
- Roman Catholicism in Ghana

== Sources ==
- GCatholic.org
- Catholic Hierarchy
