= John Abdulai Jinapor =

Ghanaian politician (born 1979)

The Honourable John Abdulai Jinapor
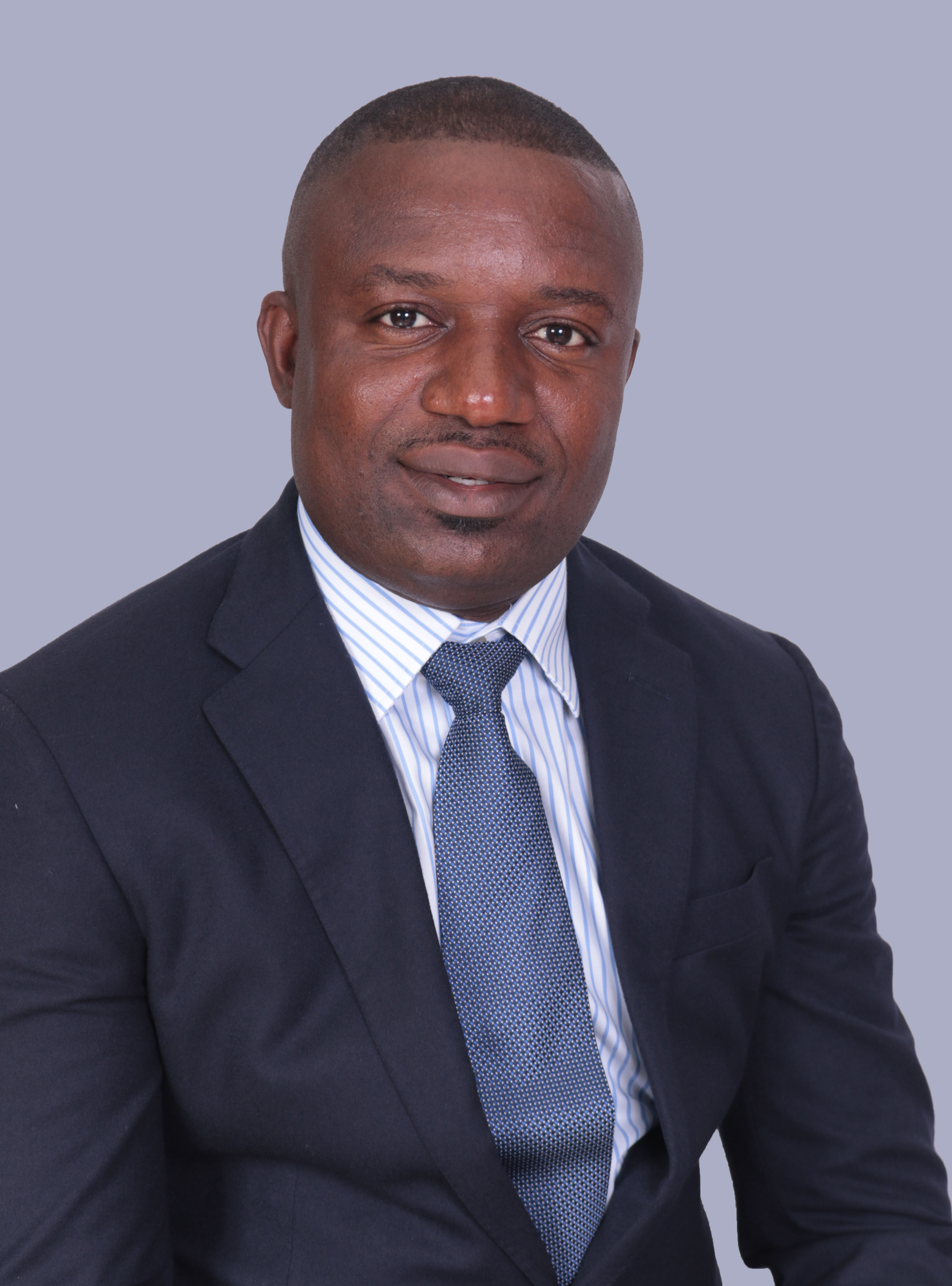

Member of Parliament for Yapei-Kusawgu Constituency
- Incumbent
- Assumed office 2017
- Preceded by: Amadu Seidu

Minister of Energy and Petroleum
- Incumbent
- Assumed office January 2025
- President: John Dramani Mahama
- Preceded by: Herbert Krapa

Deputy Minister of Energy
- In office 2013–2017
- President: John Dramani Mahama
- Preceded by: Emmanuel Armah Kofi Buah
- Succeeded by: William Owuraku Aidoo

Personal details
- Born: John Abdulai Jinapor; 8 June 1979 (age 47)
- Party: National Democratic Congress
- Spouse: Josephine Jinapor
- Relations: Samuel Abu Jinapor (brother)
- Education: University for Development Studies; University of London

John Abdulai Jinapor (born 8 June 1979) is a Ghanaian politician, a Member of Parliament representing the Yapei-Kusawgu constituency and Minister in charge of the Ministry of Energy and Petroleum (Ghana). He is a former Minister of State of Ghana. He is a member of the National Democratic Congress.

== Education ==
Jinapor attended Ghana Senior High School in Tamale. He obtained his Ph.D. in Development Finance: from the Prestigious Stellenbosch University in South Africa with publications in reputable journals. He had his master's degree in Development Finance from the University of Ghana. Post Graduate Diploma in Finance and Financial Law from the University of London. Masters of Science in Energy Economics from the Ghana Institute of Management and Public Administration (GIMPA). Master of Arts (M.A.) in Economic Policy Management from the University of Ghana. Master's degree in Marketing at the University of Ghana. Bachelor's degree from the University for Development Studies.

== Political career ==
He was appointed Deputy Minister of Energy under the John Mahama administration. He is member of the Seventh Parliament of the Fourth Republic of Ghana representing the Yapei Kusawgu Constituency in the Northern Region on the ticket of the National Democratic Congress.

=== 2016 election ===
Jinapor contested the 2016 Ghanaian general election on the ticket of National Democratic Congress and won the Yapei Kusawgu parliamentary seat with 23, 364 votes of the total votes which is equivalent to 62.13% over the parliamentary candidate of New Patriotic Party Zakaria Yakubu who polled 14, 242 votes representing 37.87% of the total votes.

== Personal life ==
Jinapor was born to Abudulai Jinapor, a former police officer and Chief of Buipe in the Savanna Region of Ghana. He is the brother of Samuel Abu Jinapor, former deputy Chief of Staff of Ghana and the current minister of Land and Natural Resources. and Dr. Ahmed Jinapor, a lecturer. He is married to Mrs. Josephine Jinapor. John Abudulai Jinapor is a christian.

== Comment about electricity company of Ghana (ECG) ==
The Ranking Member of the Energy Committee of Parliament, John Jinapor, has accused the Electricity Company of Ghana (ECG) of disseminating misinformation regarding the recent surge in intermittent power outages popularly known as dumsor. While the ECG attributes these outages to overloaded and faulty transformers, Mr Jinapor contends that the widespread load shedding is a result of financial issues, not technical glitches as claimed by the ECG.

Political offices
Preceded by	Deputy Minister of Energy; Ghana; 2013–2017	Succeeded by William Owuraku Aidoo
