= Diocese of Damongo =

Roman Catholic diocese in Ghana

Coordinates: 9.0853°N 1.8116°W

Diocese of Damongo Dioecesis Damongoensis

Location
- Country: Ghana
- Metropolitan: Tamale

Statistics
- Area: 29,000 km^{2} (11,000 sq mi)
- Population: Total; Catholics: (as of 2004); 410,000; 17,172 (4.2%)

Information
- Rite: Latin Rite

Current leadership
- Pope: Leo XIV
- Bishop: Peter Paul Yelezuome Angkyier

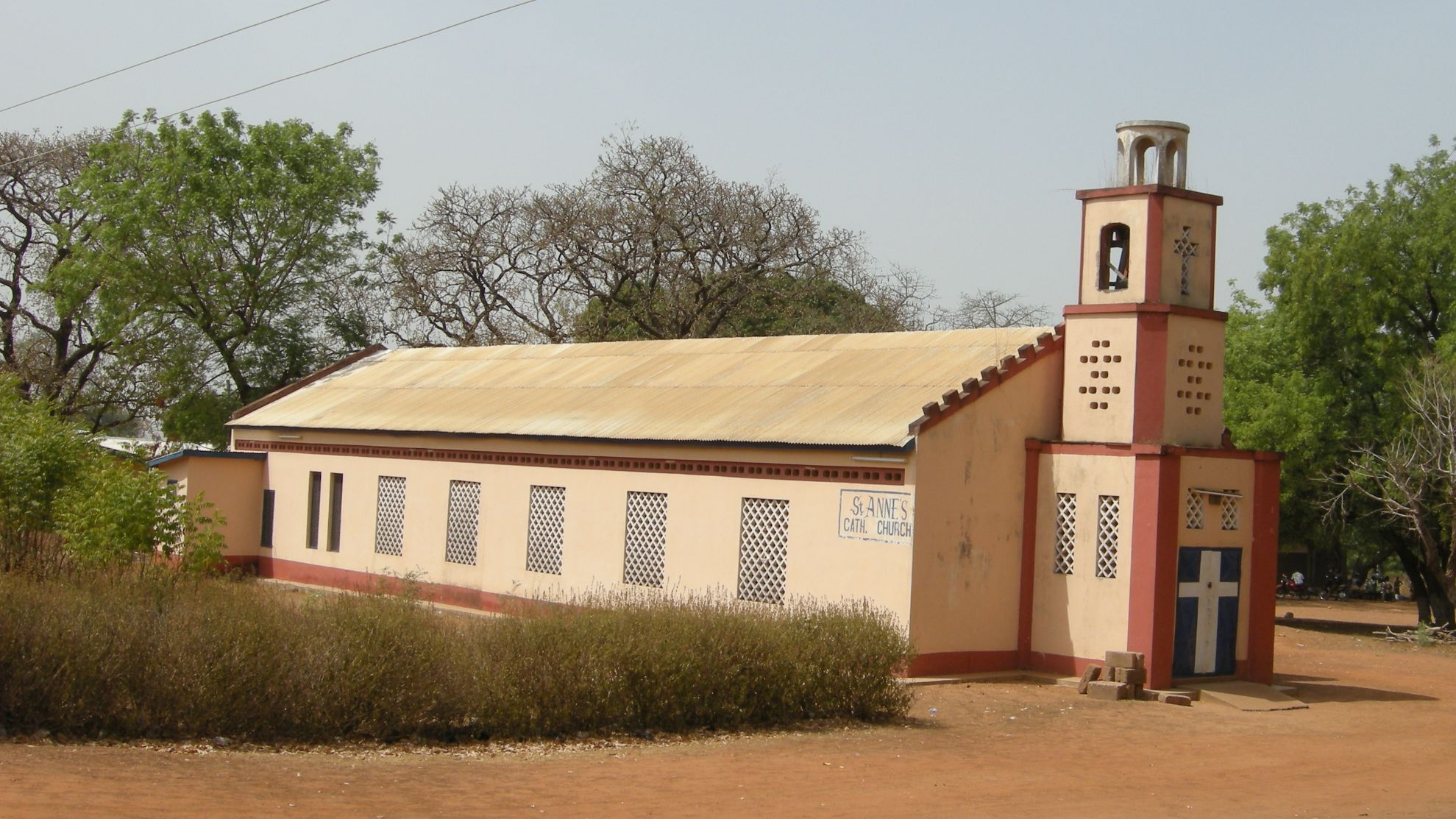
St. Anne’s Cathedral, Domongo town

The Roman Catholic Diocese of Damongo (Latin: Damongoën(sis)) is a diocese located in the city of Damongo in the ecclesiastical province of Tamale in Ghana.

== History ==
- February 3, 1995: Established as Diocese of Damongo from the Metropolitan Archdiocese of Tamale

== Special churches ==
The Cathedral is St. Anne's Cathedral Parish in Damongo.

== Leadership ==
- Bishops of the Catholic Diocese of Damongo (Roman rite)
  - Bishop Philip Naameh (3 February 1995 - 12 February 2009), appointed Archbishop of Tamale
  - Peter Paul Yelezuome Angkyier (since 17 December 2010 to date). He was born on the November 26, 1961.

== See also ==
- Roman Catholicism in Ghana

== Sources ==
- GCatholic.org
- Catholic Hierarchy
- Diocese of Damongo
