= Santa Maria Immacolata di Lourdes a Boccea =

- Church of Holy Mary Immaculate of Lourdes at Boccea
- Chiesa di Santa Maria Immacolata di Lourdes
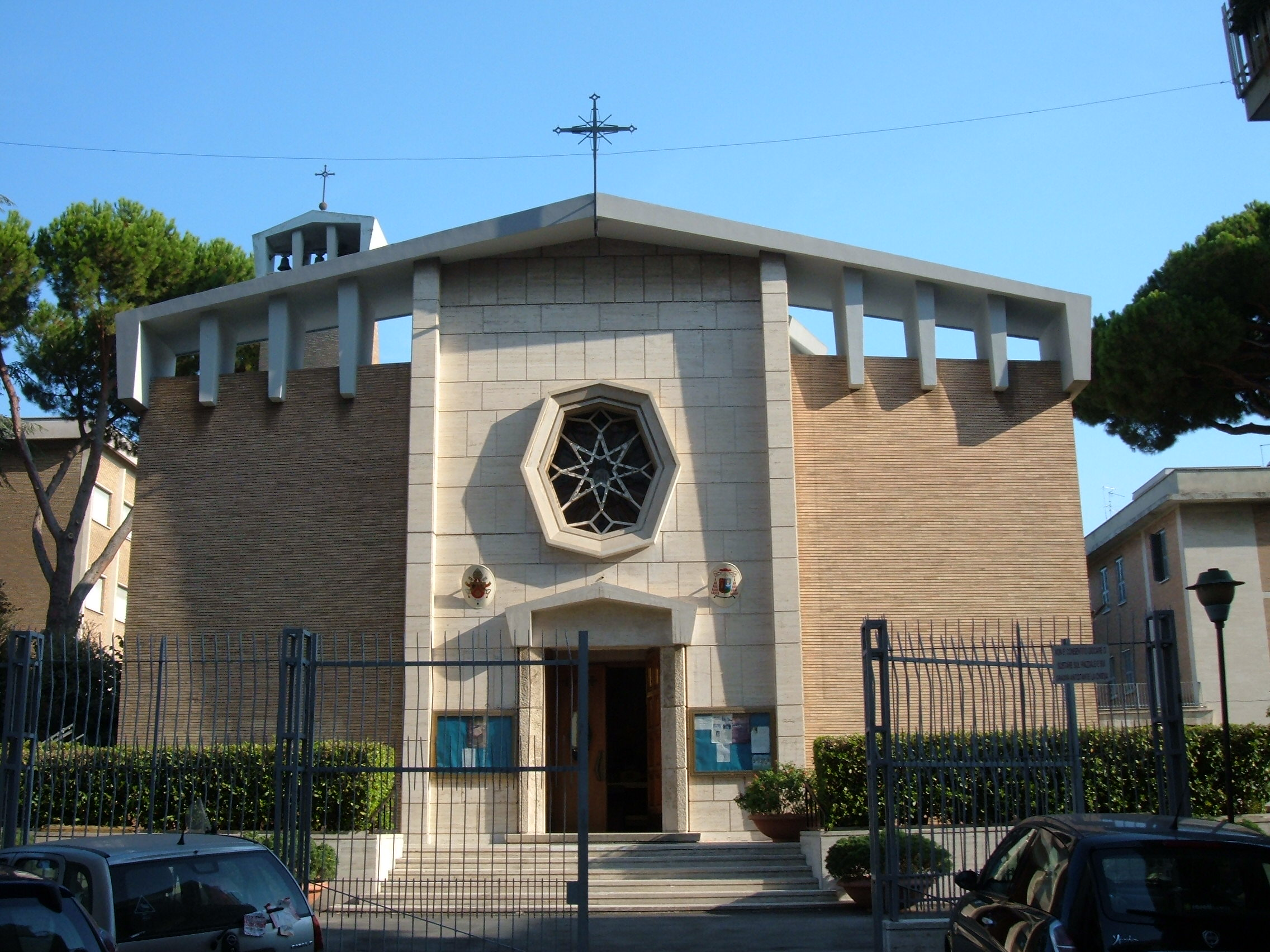
- Facade
- Click on the map for a fullscreen view
- 41°54′10″N 12°25′40″E
- Location: Via Santa Bernadette 23, Rome
- Country: Italy
- Language: Italian
- Denomination: Catholic
- Tradition: Roman Rite
- Religious order: Sisters of the Immaculate Conception of Our Lady of Lourdes

History
- Status: titular church
- Founded: 1958
- Dedication: Mary, mother of Jesus (as Our Lady of Lourdes)
- Consecrated: 11 February 1965

Architecture
- Functional status: Active
- Architect: Domenico Placidi
- Architectural type: Modern
- Completed: 1958

Administration
- Diocese: Rome

Santa Maria Immacolata di Lourdes a Boccea is a 20th-century parochial church and titular church in Rome, dedicated to Our Lady of Lourdes.

== History ==
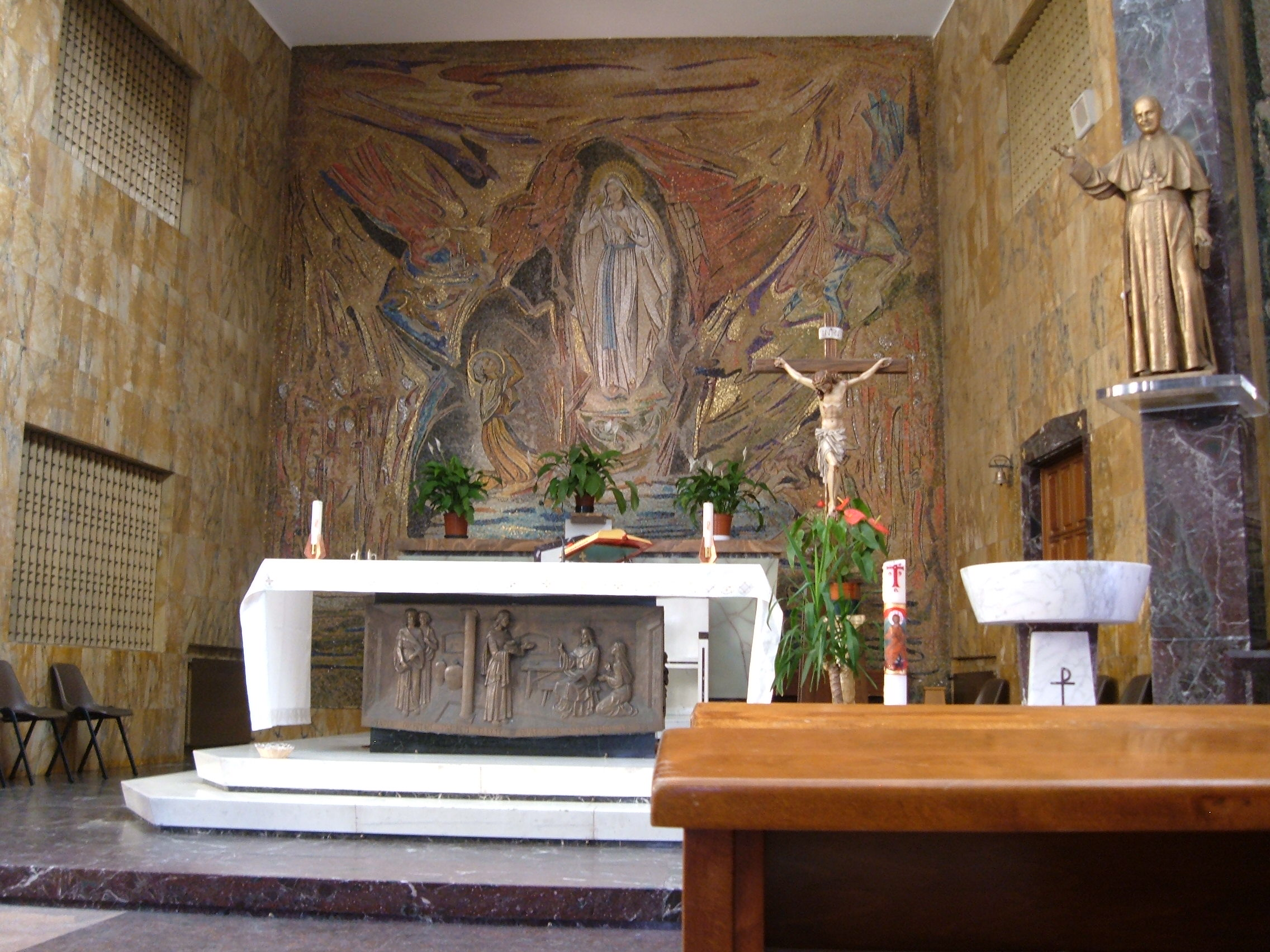
View of altar

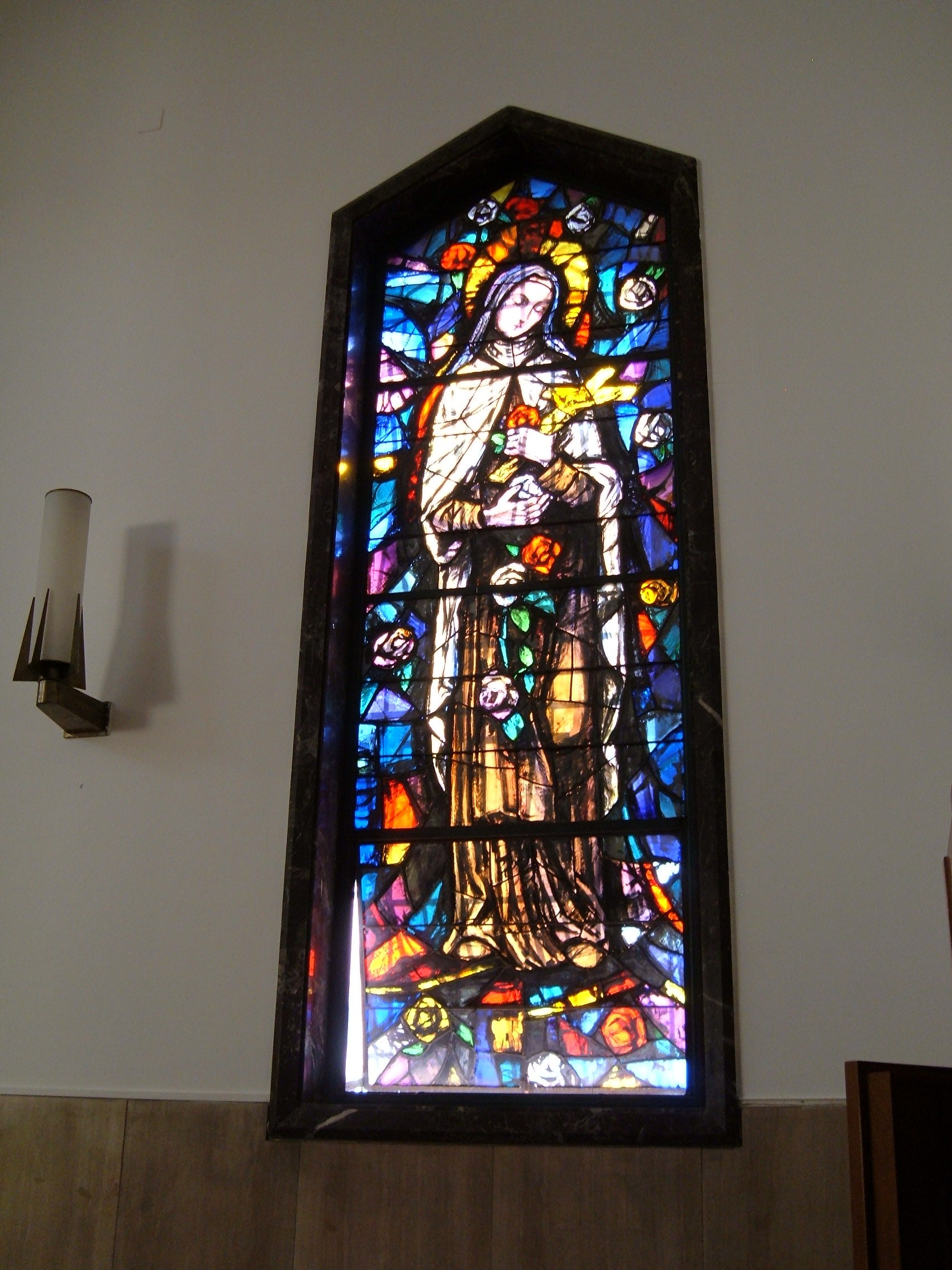
Stained-glass window in the church

The church was built in 1958, the centenary of the first Lourdes apparitions, as a parish church of the Diocese of Rome attached to the school of the Suore dell'Immacolata Concezione di Nostra Signora di Lourdes (Sisters of the Immaculate Conception of Our Lady of Lourdes). The façade is characterized by a large concrete pseudotympanum, set on a central band in travertine, which contains the entrance portal and a rose window.

In 1985, it was made a titular church to be held by a cardinal-priest.

Titulars

- Juan Francisco Fresno (1985–2004)
- Nicholas Cheong Jin-suk (2006–2021)
- Richard Baawobr (2022)
- François-Xavier Bustillo (2023-)
