= Amadu Seidu =

Ghanaian politician

Hon. Amadu Seidu

Member of Parliament
- In office January 2005 – 2008
- President: John Kufuor
- Constituency: Yapei/Kusawgu

Member of Parliament
- In office 7 January 2009 – 6 January 2013
- President: John Atta Mills
- Constituency: Yapei/Kusawgu
- Majority: NDC

Personal details
- Born: 9 March 1954 (age 72)
- Party: National Democratic Congress
- Children: 2
- Education: University of Ghana
- Occupation: Economic Planning Officer
- Profession: Economist/Banker/Insurer

Amadu Seidu (born March 9, 1954) is a Ghanaian member of parliament for Yapei-Kusawgu constituency in the Northern Region under the ticket of the National Democratic Congress.

== Early life and education ==
Seidu was born on March 9, 1954. He hails from Mpaha in the Northern Region of Ghana. He earned a bachelor's degree from the University of Ghana at Legon in 1982.

== Career ==
He is an economist, insurer and banker by profession. He is a member of Reconstituted Board for VRA Resettlement Trust Fund Build Capacity.

== Politics ==
Amadu was elected into the first parliament of the fourth republic of Ghana on 7 January 1993 after he was pronounced winner at the 1992 Ghanaian parliamentary election held on 29 December 1992.

He was thereafter re- elected into the second parliament of the fourth republic of Ghana after emerging winner at the 1996 Ghanaian General Elections with 13,475 votes out of the 20,953 valid votes cast representing 47.00% over his opponents Zakariah Yakubu of the New Patriotic Party who polled 5,195 votes, Daneil Suleman Zakariah of the Convention people's Party who polled 1,467 votes and Samson Mahamadu Languah of the National Congress Party who polled 316 votes. He won in the 2000 General elections with 10,333 votes out of the 17,786 valid votes cast representing 58.10%

In 2004, Seidu was re-elected to represent the Yapei-Kusawgu constituency for the 2004 general election. He polled 149 votes to beat two other contestants, Salifu Yaquob Wilson and John Adams who polled 66 and 25 votes respectively at a constituency delegates' congress at Yapei.

In the 2008 Ghanaian general elections, he was elected as the Member of parliament for the Yapei/Kusawgu constituency in the Northern Region for the 5th parliament of the 4th republic of Ghana.

He was elected with 12,517 votes out of 25,712 total valid votes cast. He was elected over Yakubu Zakaria of the New Patriotic Party, Bauh George Inusah of the People's National Convention, Yahaya Shaibu of the Democratic Freedom Party, Issahaku Iddisah of the Democratic People's Party, Sappor Isaac Tetteh of the Convention People's Party and Abubakari Abass Alhassan an independent candidate. These obtained 48.12%, 1.24%, 1.12%, 0.21% and 0.64% respectively of total valid votes cast.

== Personal life ==
Seidu is a Muslim and he is married with seven children.
