= Samuel Abu Jinapor =

Ghanaian lawyer and politician

Samuel A. Jinapor, MP
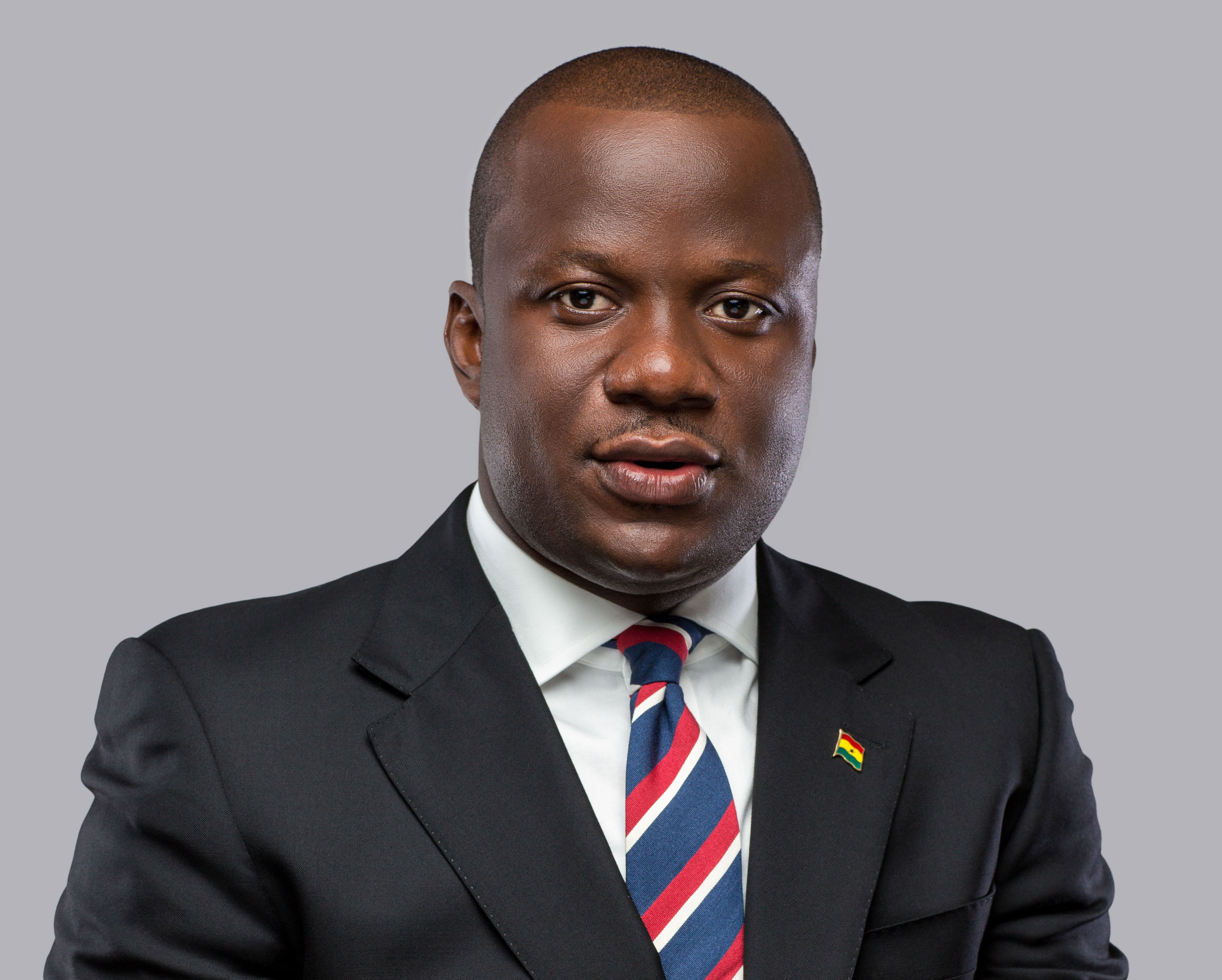

Ranking Member, Foreign Affairs Committee of Parliament
- Incumbent
- Assumed office January 2025

Personal details
- Born: 1983 Ghana
- Party: New Patriotic Party
- Spouse: Naada D. Bilijo Jinapor
- Relations: John Jinapor (brother)
- Children: 5
- Education: Kwame Nkrumah University of Science and Technology, University of Ghana, Ghana School of Law, University of London
- Occupation: Politician
- Profession: Lawyer
- Portfolio: Member of Parliament

Samuel A. Jinapor (born 1983) is a Ghanaian lawyer and a politician. He is a member of the New Patriotic Party and the Member of Parliament for the Damongo Constituency. In 2017, President Nana Addo Dankwa Akufo-Addo appointed him as Deputy Chief of Staff in charge of Operations at the Office of the President, at the age of 33, the youngest in the history of Ghana to occupy such a position.

== Early life and education ==
Samuel A. Jinapor was born in 1983 to Abdulai Jinapor, a former police officer and Chief of Buipe in the Savannah Region of Ghana. He attended the Kwame Nkrumah University of Science and Technology and graduated with a Bachelor of Science degree in Physics but specialized in Biomedical Physics in 2006.

He proceeded to the University of Ghana in 2008 where he earned a Bachelor of Laws in 2010. That same year, he was admitted to read LLB at Ghana School of Law, Makola, Accra. He was called to the Ghana Bar in 2012 as a Solicitor and Barrister of the Supreme Court of Ghana.

In 2025 he obtained a Master of Arts in International Development from the School of Oriental and African Studies, University of London, UK.

== Career ==
Hon. Jinapor rose to the position of Senior Associate. In this capacity, he developed the skills for quick thinking and oratory, and he served as an advocate in major commercial and corporate litigations. Whilst at the firm, Hon. Jinapor acted as a transactional lawyer for several complex, commercial negotiations, both domestically and internationally.

Again, as Senior Associate, he was periodically assigned to manage a team of lawyers from diverse backgrounds. Over the years, he had the rare opportunity of representing major foreign companies in Ghana as a Solicitor and Legal Advocate, both in Ghanaian Courts and Arbitral Tribunals.

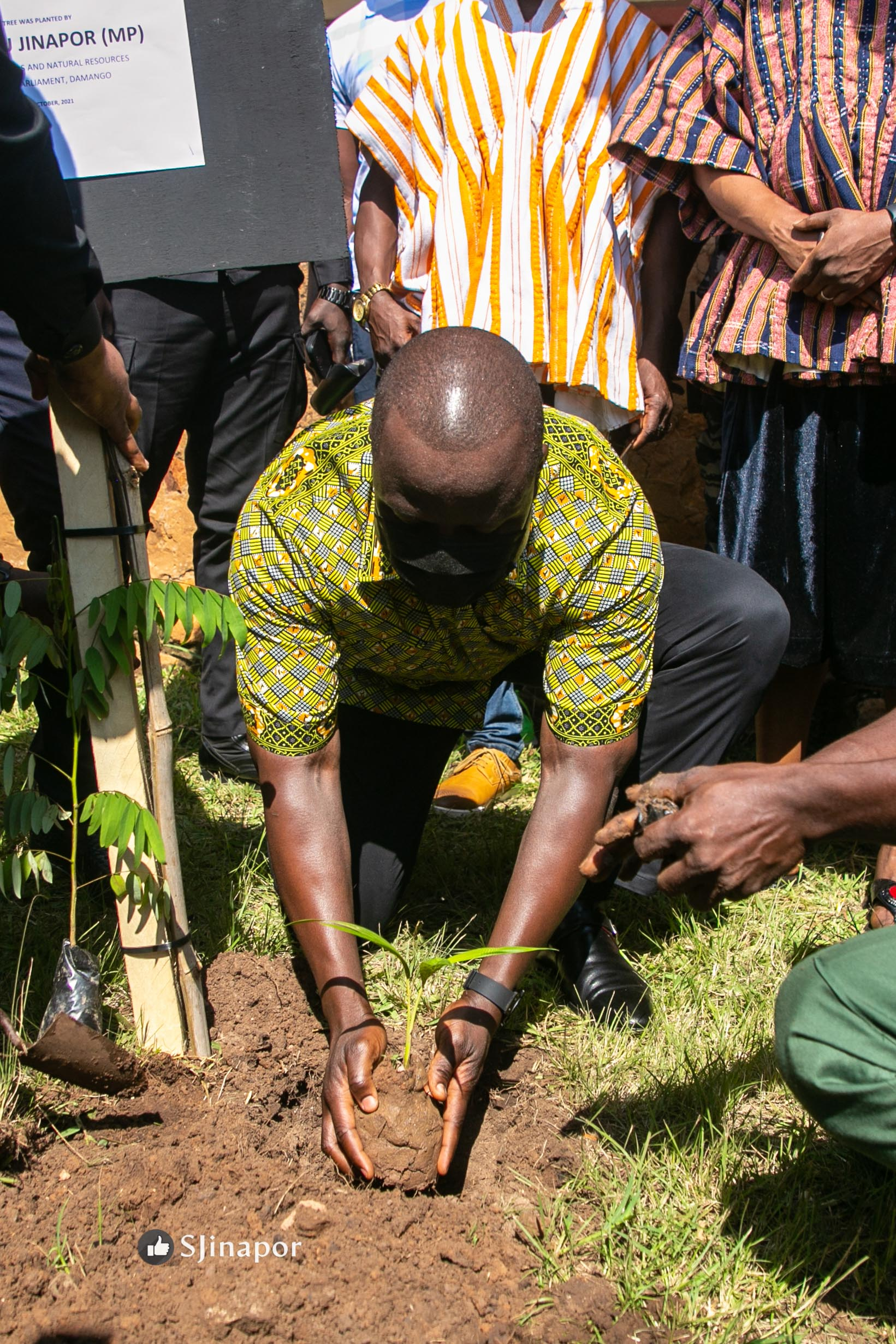
Abu Jinapor engages in tree planting exercise in his constituency.

== Political life ==
His interest in Ghana's public affairs encouraged him to join politics in 2004. His political activism earned him the opportunity at the age of 23 to accompany the then President of the Republic, His Excellency, John Agyekum Kufour, on a State Visit to the United Kingdom (UK) in 2007.

In 2007, Jinapor was appointed by Nana Addo Dankwa Akufo-Addo, then presidential aspirant of the New Patriotic Party, as his campaign Assistant for the Party's Presidential Primaries that year. Though, Nana Akufo-Addo won the primaries, he lost the main elections in 2008, but Jinapor stayed as aide for the 2012 Elections.

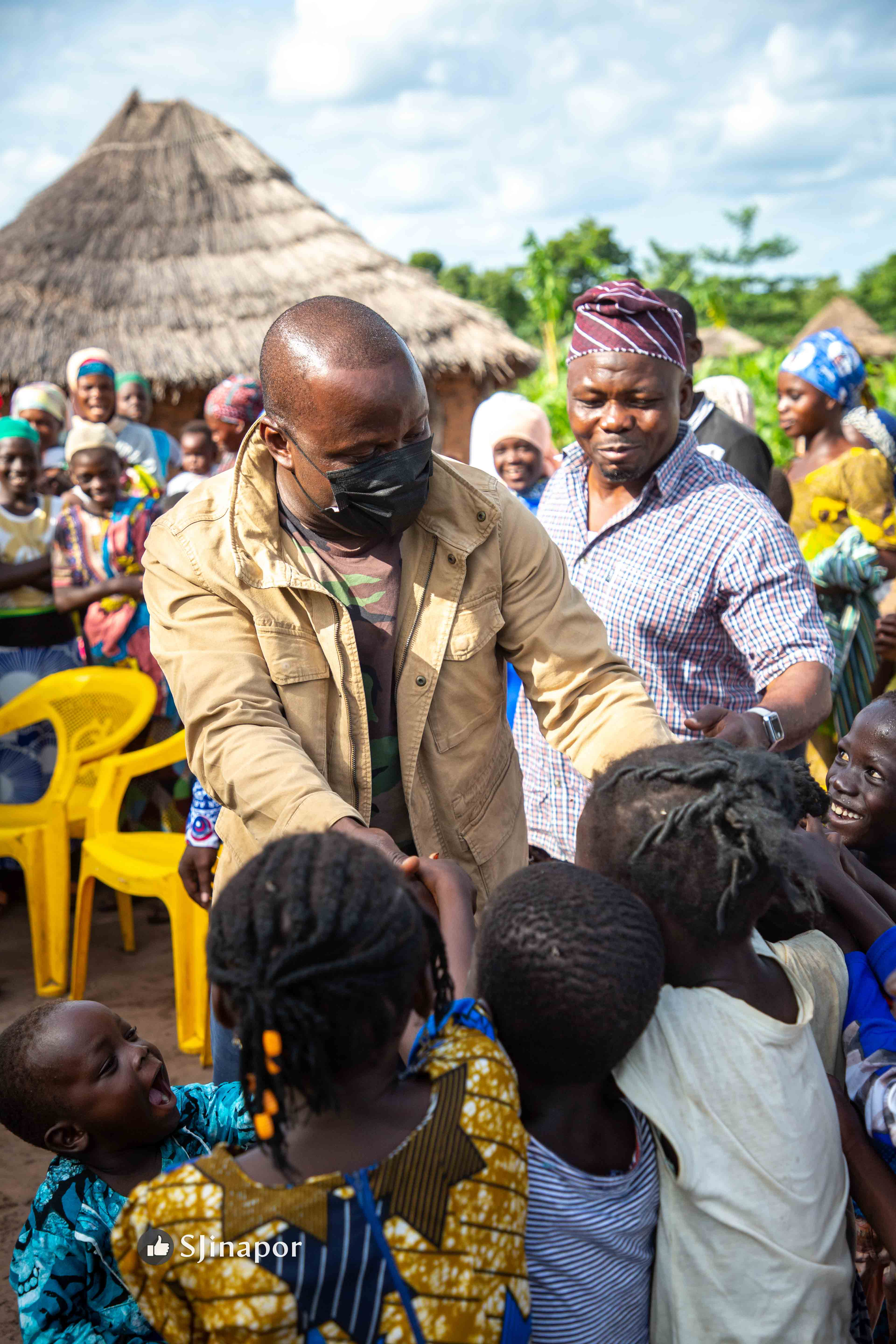
Abu Jinapor engages with constituency.

In the 2016 general elections, Samuel Abu Jinapor, played a major political advocacy role for the New Patriotic Party (NPP) and candidate, Akufo-Addo. He was seen and heard on major media and campaign platforms across the country, taking on the incumbent, John Dramani Mahama's government.

In 2017, President Akufo-Addo appointed him as Deputy Chief of Staff in charge of Operations at the Office of the President.

As Deputy Chief of Staff, he assisted the Chief of Staff, Frema Osei Opare in mobilizing government machinery to support the execution of the President's agenda for the country. Having worked, closely, in various capacities with President Akufo-Addo, both in opposition and government, Mr. Jinapor has gained considerable experience in the workings of government.

In 2020, whilst still performing his demanding task as Deputy Chief of Staff, he contested the parliamentary seat of Damongo, the maternal hometown of former President John Dramani Mahama, the 2020 Presidential Candidate of the National Democratic Congress (NDC), and won that highly competitive election with a significant margin of victory.

For the results, he won with 15,989 votes, representing 54.1% of the total votes cast whilst the NDC parliamentary candidate Adam Mutawakilu had 13,279 votes making 44.9% of the total votes cast, the independent parliamentary candidate David Tiki Dange had 296 votes making 1.0% of the total votes cast.

| SAMUEL A. JINAPOR Winner | NPP | 15,989 | 54.1% | — | |
| ADAM MUTAWAKILU | NDC | 13,279 | 44.9 | | — |
| DAVID TIKI DANGE | IND | 296 | 1.0 | | — |

Former President Akufo-Addo nominated him as the Minister responsible for Lands and Natural Resources in his second term government. He also served as the caretaker minister for Trade and Industry from January 2023 to April, 2023. As many pundits have attested, he has, thus far, held and executed his ministerial duties with competence, courage and integrity.

He was appointed as co-chair of the Forests and Climate Leaders’ Partnership in 2022, along with Secretary John Kerry, the United States Special Presidential Envoy for Climate.

In July 2024, he was appointed the Oversight Minister for Energy by President Akufo-Addo following the resignation of Dr. Mathew Opoku-Prempeh, following his nomination as Vice Presidential Candidate for the ruling New Patriotic Party.

He is currently the Member of Parliament for the Damongo Constituency in the Savannah Region of Ghana and the Ranking Member for the Parliamentary Select Committee on Foreign Affairs.

== Xenophobia Brouhaha ==
Amidst the xenophobic attacks in South Africa, the South Africa president, Cyril Ramaphosa intended visit Ghana, however this has sparked widespread arguments on the media. Follow this, Ghana, declined the visit which further erupted comments by a lot of Ghanaians.

The Damongo member of parliament, Honorable Samuel Abu Jinapor caution the government, saying "A lot has happened within the past 24 hours, in relation to foreign affairs, particularly Ghana’s bilateral relations with South Africa. He further added that "for me to also be quick in pointing out that all foreign relations, plus one, to Article 73 of our national constitution, must be in accord or must promote Ghana’s national interest.”

== Personal life ==
He is happily married to Mrs. Naada D. B. Jinapor, a Lawyer and head of the Corporate Law Department of the Social Security and National Insurance Trust (SSNIT) of Ghana and their marriage is blessed with four (4) daughters and a son.

Political offices
| Preceded by | Deputy Chief of Staff; 2017– | Incumbent |
