= Yapei-Kusawgu (Ghana parliament constituency) =

Ghana parliament constituency

- constituency for the Parliament of Ghana
- District: Central Gonja District
- Region: Savannah Region of Ghana

Current constituency
- Party: National Democratic Congress
- MP: John Abdulai Jinapor

Yapei-Kusawgu is one of the constituencies represented in the Parliament of Ghana. It elects one Member of Parliament (MP) by the first past the post system of election. It is located in the Savannah Region of Ghana. The current member of Parliament for the constituency is John Abdulai Jinapor. He was elected on the ticket of the National Democratic Congress (NDC) and won a majority of votes to win the constituency election to become the MP.

He had represented the constituency in the 4th Republican parliament on the ticket of the National Democratic Congress. He succeeded Alhaji Seidu Amadu.

== See also ==
- List of Ghana Parliament constituencies
