= Richard Baawobr =

Ghanaian Catholic prelate (1959–2022)

His Eminence Richard Kuuia Baawobr MAfr
- Bishop of Wa
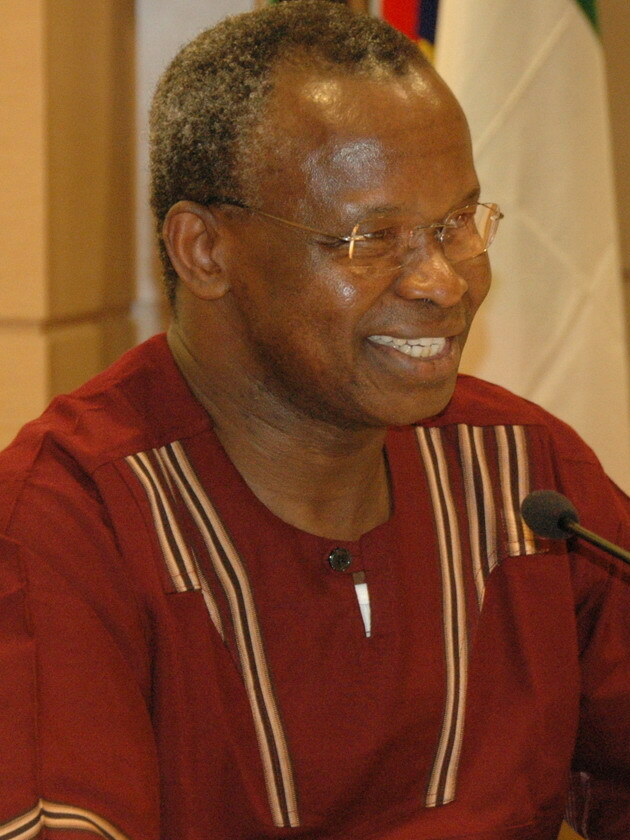
- Baawobr in 2011
- Church: Roman Catholic Church
- Diocese: Wa
- Appointed: 17 February 2016
- Installed: 7 May 2016
- Term ended: 27 November 2022
- Predecessor: Paul Bemile
- Successor: Francis Bomansaan
- Other post: Cardinal Priest of Santa Maria Immacolata di Lourdes a Boccea (2022)
- Previous posts: Superior General of the Missionaries of Africa (2010–2016); Vice-Grand Chancellor of the Pontifical Institute of Arab and Islamic Studies (2010–2016)

Orders
- Ordination: 18 July 1987
- Consecration: 7 May 2016 by Peter Turkson
- Created cardinal: 27 August 2022 by Pope Francis
- Rank: Cardinal priest

Personal details
- Born: Richard Kuuia Baawobr; 21 June 1959 Tom-Zendagangn, Ghana
- Died: 27 November 2022 (aged 63) Rome, Italy
- Motto: Servus misericordiae Dei (Latin for 'Servant of the mercy of God')

Styles of Richard Kuuia Baawobr
- Reference style: His Eminence
- Spoken style: Your Eminence
- Religious style: Cardinal
- Informal style: Cardinal

Coat of arms before becoming a cardinal (used 2016–2022)

Richard Kuuia Baawobr, MAfr (21 June 1959 – 27 November 2022) was a Ghanaian Catholic prelate who served as Bishop of Wa from 2016 until his death in 2022. A member of the Missionaries of Africa (also known as the White Fathers), he worked in the Democratic Republic of the Congo, France, and Tanzania before being named a bishop in his native country. Pope Francis created him a cardinal on 27 August 2022. Baawobr died just a few months later.

== Biography ==
Richard Kuuia Baawobr was born in Tom-Zendagangn, in Nandom District, Dominion of Ghana on 21 June 1959. After attending the village primary school, St. Francis Xavier Minor Seminary, and Nandom Secondary School, he was admitted in 1979 to the St. Victor major seminary in Tamale for his philosophical studies. He then joined the Society of Missionaries of Africa in 1981 and continued his preparation for priesthood. He fulfilled his novitiate in Fribourg, Switzerland by 1982. He then moved to the Missionary Institute London where his theological studies were completed in 1987. He made his religious vows at St. Edward's College in London on 5 December 1986 and was ordained a priest on 18 July 1987.

From 1987 to 1991, he was the parish vicar in Livulu in the Archdiocese of Kinshasa in the Democratic Republic of Congo. Studying exegesis at the Pontifical Biblical Institute in Rome and Ignatian spirituality at Le Chatelard in Lyon, France, between 1991 and 1996, he earned a licentiate in sacred scripture as well as a doctorate in Biblical theology. From 1996 to 1999, he was his order's formator in Kahangala, Tanzania. From 1999 to 2004 he was director of their Toulouse formation house. From 2004 to 2010, he was first assistant general of the order.

In 2010, he was elected to a six-year term as the order's superior general, the first African to hold that position, as well as serving as Vice Grand Chancellor of the Pontifical Institute of Arab and Islamic Studies. The Union of Superiors General selected him to attend the Synod on the Family in October 2015.

On 17 February 2016, Baawobr was appointed Bishop of Wa in Ghana by Pope Francis. He received his episcopal consecration on 7 May 2016 from Cardinal Peter Turkson.

Baawobr was also appointed a member and consultor of the Pontifical Council for Promoting Christian Unity on 4 July 2020.

In harmony with the Ghanaian Episcopate, he repeatedly expressed his opposition to claims by the LGBT+ community. He praised the draft law of the Ghanaian anti-LGBT bill, which was presented in 2021 to the Parliament. Despite strong criticism from various international organizations, Bishop Baawobr invited the president of the Parliament to proceed with the discussion of the text.

On 29 May 2022, Pope Francis announced that he would make Baawobr a cardinal at a consistory scheduled for August.

Later that year, Baawobr was elected president of the Symposium of Episcopal Conferences of Africa and Madagascar (SECAM) on 30 July at a plenary assembly in Accra. He became the first Ghanaian to hold that position.

Baawobr traveled to Rome to attend the consistory scheduled for 27 August, but he was taken ill and did not attend. On that day Pope Francis made him a cardinal priest and assigned him the titular church of Santa Maria Immacolata di Lourdes a Boccea. He became the third Ghanaian to have been created a cardinal, after Peter Turkson and Peter Porekuu Dery. He remained in hospital for several days.

Baawobr died in Rome's Gemelli Hospital shortly after arriving there by ambulance on 27 November 2022, at the age of 63. He had undergone heart surgery in late August and was released from the hospital a few days before his death.

== See also ==
- Cardinals created by Pope Francis
