= Archdiocese of Tamale =

Roman Catholic archdiocese in Ghana

Coordinates: 9.4012°N 0.8352°W

Archdiocese of Tamale Archidioecesis Tamalensis

Location
- Country: Ghana
- Headquarters: Tamale, Ghana

Statistics
- Area: 7,383 km^{2} (2,851 sq mi)
- Population: Total; Catholics: (as of 2022); 1,116,909; 23,330 (2.1%)
- Parishes: 18

Information
- Denomination: Catholic Church
- Sui iuris church: Latin Church
- Rite: Roman Rite
- Established: 11 January 1926; 100 years ago
- Secular priests: 74 (52 Diocesan, 22 Religious Orders)

Current leadership
- Pope: Leo XIV
- Metropolitan Archbishop: Philip Naameh

The Roman Catholic Archdiocese of Tamale (Latin: Tamalen(sis)) is the Metropolitan See for the ecclesiastical province of Tamale in Ghana.

== History ==
- 11 January 1926: Established as Apostolic Prefecture of Navrongo from the Apostolic Vicariate of Ouagadougou in Burkina Faso
- 26 February 1934: Promoted as Apostolic Vicariate of Navrongo
- 18 April 1950: Established as Diocese of Tamale from the Apostolic Vicariate of Navrongo; Navrongo would be revived as a diocese name in 1956 for a new diocese which later became the Roman Catholic Diocese of Navrongo–Bolgatanga
- 30 May 1977: Promoted as Metropolitan Archdiocese of Tamale

== Special churches ==
The seat of the archbishop is Our Lady of Annunciation Cathedral in Tamale.

== Bishops ==
=== Ordinaries ===
Prefect Apostolic of Navrongo

- Oscar Morin, M. Afr. (14 April 1926 – 26 February 1934 see below)

Vicars Apostolic of Navrongo

- Oscar Morin, M. Afr. (see above 26 February 1934 – 15 April 1947), resigned
- Gérard Bertrand, M. Afr. (10 June 1948 – 18 April 1950 see below)

Bishops of Tamale

- Gerard Bertrand, M. Afr. (see above 18 April 1950 – 12 April 1957), appointed Bishop of Navrongo; see above
- Gabriel Champagne, M. Afr. (12 April 1957 – 23 June 1972), resigned
- Peter Porekuu Dery (18 November 1974 – 30 May 1977 see below)

Metropolitan Archbishops of Tamale (Roman rite)

- Peter Porekuu Dery (see above 30 May 1977 – 26 March 1994), retired
- Gregory Eebolawola Kpiebaya (26 March 1994 – 12 February 2009), retired
- Philip Naameh (12 February 2009 – Present)

=== Other priests of this diocese who became bishop ===
- Peter Paul Yelezuome Angkyier (1992-1995), appointed Bishop of Damongo in 2010
- Matthew Yitiereh (1995-2022), appointed Bishop of Yendi in 2022

== Suffragan Dioceses ==
- Damongo
- Navrongo–Bolgatanga
- Wa
- Yendi

== See also ==
- Roman Catholicism in Ghana

== Sources ==
- GCatholic.org
