= Philip Naameh =

- Archbishop of Tamale
- Church: Catholic Church
- Archdiocese: Archdiocese of Tamale
- Appointed: 12 February 2009
- Predecessor: Gregory Eebolawola Kpiebaya
- Previous post: Bishop of Damongo (1995-2009)

Orders
- Ordination: 16 December 1977
- Consecration: 28 May 1995 by Jozef Tomko

Personal details
- Born: 8 September 1948 (age 78) Nandom-Ko, Colony of the Gold Coast, British Empire

Philip Naameh (born 8 September 1948) is a Ghanaian prelate of the Catholic Church who has been archbishop of Tamale since 2009. He was bishop of Damongo from 1995 to 2009.

== Biography ==
Philip Naameh was born on 8 September 1948 in Nandom-Ko in the Upper West Region. He had his elementary education from 1957 to 1962. He then continued to St. Charles Minor Seminary and Government Secondary School in Tamale, where he had his Secondary School and Sixth Form Education respectively. In 1971, he entered St. Victor’s Major Seminary in Tamale for his Philosophical and Theological studies. He was matriculated into the University of Ghana, Legon, in 1973, where he later obtained a Diploma in Theology in 1976. From 1981 to 1986, he left for Germany for studies and obtained a PhD in Theology from the Westfälische Wilhelms Universität, Germany, he entered the school of Oriental and African Studies of the University of London in the UK for an MA in African History in 1992.

From 1986 to 1995, he was a lecturer at St. Victor's Major Seminary.

In December 1977, he was ordained a priest for the Archdiocese of Tamale. In the same year, after his ordination, he did his Pastoral ministry in the Archdiocese of Tamale at the Cathedral. He was in charge of the Laity council, was the Local Manager for Catholic Schools, and the Diocesan Vocations Director.

He was appointed bishop of the newly created Diocese of Damongo by John Paul II on 3 February 1995 and received his episcopal consecration on 28 May 1995.

On 12 February 2009, Naameh was appointed the Metropolitan Archbishop of Tamale by Pope Benedict XVI. He was installed there on 25 April 2009. He is the president of the Ghana Catholic Bishop's Conference (GCBC)

Naameh has taken up the issue of sexual abuse in the Church and made it his pastoral priority.
