= Peter Porekuu Dery =

20th and 21st-century Ghanaian Catholic cardinal

Servant of God Peter Porekuu Dery
- Cardinal-Deacon of Sant'Elena fuori Porta Prenestina
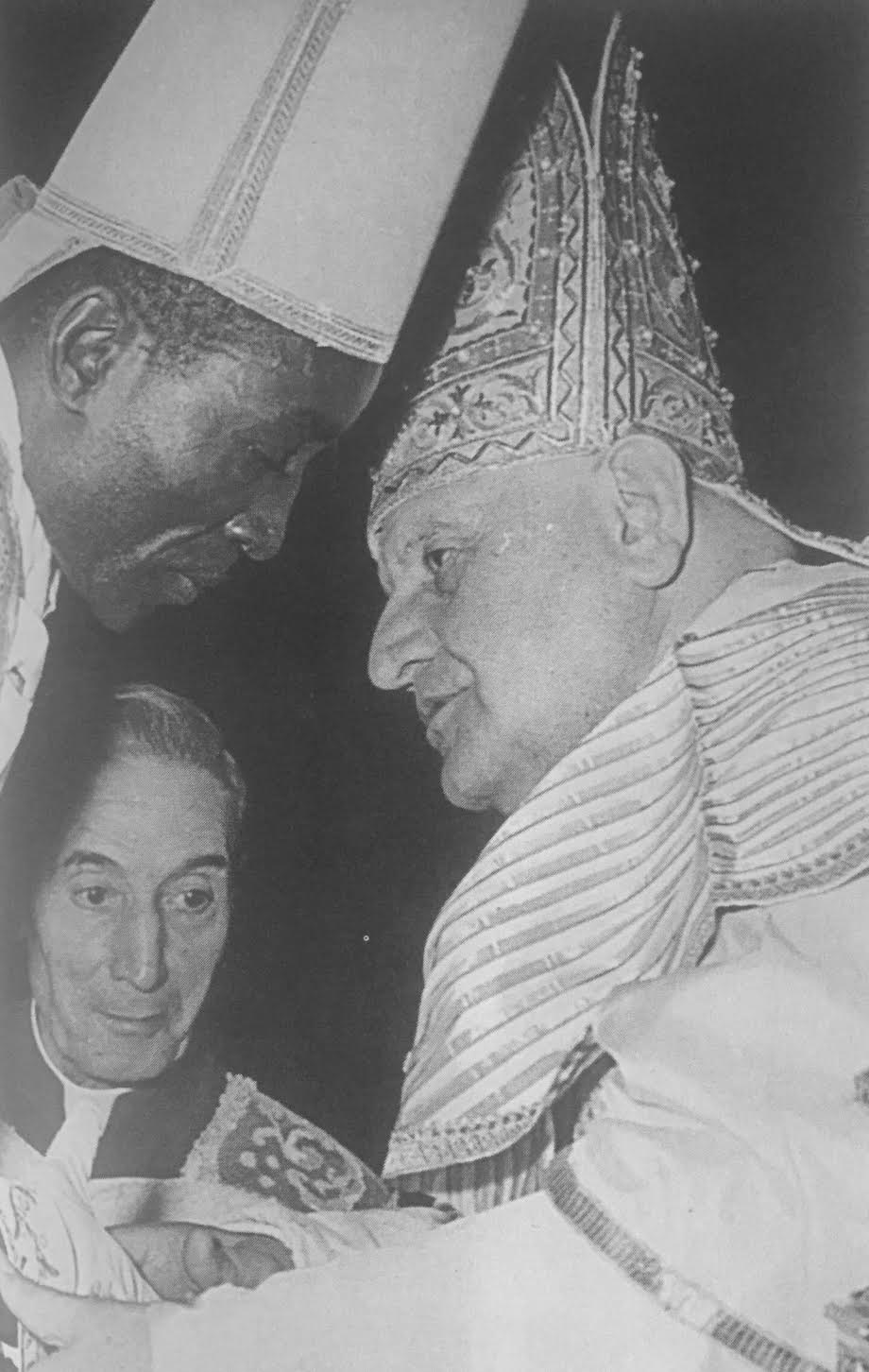
- Dery (left) with Pope John XXIII
- Church: Roman Catholic Church
- Appointed: 24 March 2006
- Installed: 28 March 2006
- Term ended: 6 March 2008
- Predecessor: Edouard Gagnon
- Successor: João Braz de Aviz
- Previous posts: Bishop of Wa (1960–74); Apostolic Administrator of Tamale (1972–74); Bishop of Tamale (1974–77); Archbishop of Tamale (1977–94); President of the Ghanaian Episcopal Conference (1982–88)

Orders
- Ordination: 11 February 1951 by Gérard Bertrand
- Consecration: 8 May 1960 by Pope John XXIII
- Created cardinal: 24 March 2006 by Pope Benedict XVI
- Rank: Cardinal-Deacon

Personal details
- Born: Porekuu Der; 10 May 1918 Wa, Gold Coast (now Ghana)
- Died: 6 March 2008 (aged 89) Tamale, Ghana
- Motto: Apostolus Jesu Christi ("Apostle of Jesus Christ")
- Coat of arms: Peter Porekuu Dery's coat of arms

Styles of Peter Dery
- Reference style: His Eminence
- Spoken style: Your Eminence
- Informal style: Cardinal
- See: Tamale

Ordination history of Peter Porekuu Dery
History
Priestly ordination
- Ordained by: Gérard Bertrand
- Date: 11 February 1951
- Place: Saint Theresa's Church, Nandom, Ghana
Episcopal consecration
- Principal consecrator: Pope John XXIII
- Co-consecrators: Napoléon-Alexandre Labrie & Fulton John Sheen
- Date: 8 May 1960
- Place: Saint Peter's Basilica, Vatican City
Cardinalate
- Elevated by: Pope Benedict XVI
- Date: 24 March 2006
Episcopal succession
Bishops consecrated by Peter Porekuu Dery as principal consecrator
- Gregory Ebolawola Kpiebaya: 15 March 1975
- Paul Bemile: 25 March 1995
- Vincent Sowah Boi-Nai, S.V.D.: 10 July 1999

Peter Porekuu Dery (10 May 1918 – 6 March 2008), originally Porekuu Der, was a Ghanaian prelate of the Catholic Church who served as Archbishop of Tamale from 1974 to 1994, and was elevated to the rank of cardinal in 2006. He was the Bishop of Wa from 1960 to 1974.

The cause for his canonization commenced in mid-2013 and he is now referred to as a Servant of God.

== Life ==
=== Education and early career ===
Porekuu Der was born in 1918 in Zimuopare in the Ko Parish, the fourth of ten children born to Theodore Porekuu and Agnes Zoore in the house of his uncle Ngmankurinaa. His birth followed closely upon the death of his immediate older brother. The Dagaare-speaking people of North-Western Ghana and Southern Burkina-Faso believe that a male child born not long after the death of his immediate elder brother is the reincarnation of the deceased brother and he is given the additional name "Der" to demonstrate that, a practice his pagan parents adopted.

He converted to Roman Catholicism and was baptized alongside ten others in Jirapa on 24 December 1932. He then changed his name from "Der" to "Dery" and took the name "Peter" in honor of Saint Peter. He was then sent to Jirapa to become a catechist, so he could return to his village to teach his people in the Catholic faith.

Porekuu studied for the priesthood in Navrongo from 1934 to 1939 and then studied philosophy and theology at Saint Victor's Seminary in Wiagha. He received his ordination to the priesthood at Saint Theresa's Church in Nandom from Bishop Gérard Bertrand on 11 February 1951. He earned a diploma in social studies from the Saint Francis Xavier college in Antigonish in Canada in 1958 and his doctorate in theology from the International Catechetical Institute "Lumen vitae" in Brussels, Belgium, aided by a scholarship from the Knights of Columbus in 1957. He returned to Ghana in 1959 and served as parochial vicar in Nandom and then served as the vicar-general for the Tamale archdiocese until 1960.

=== Bishop ===
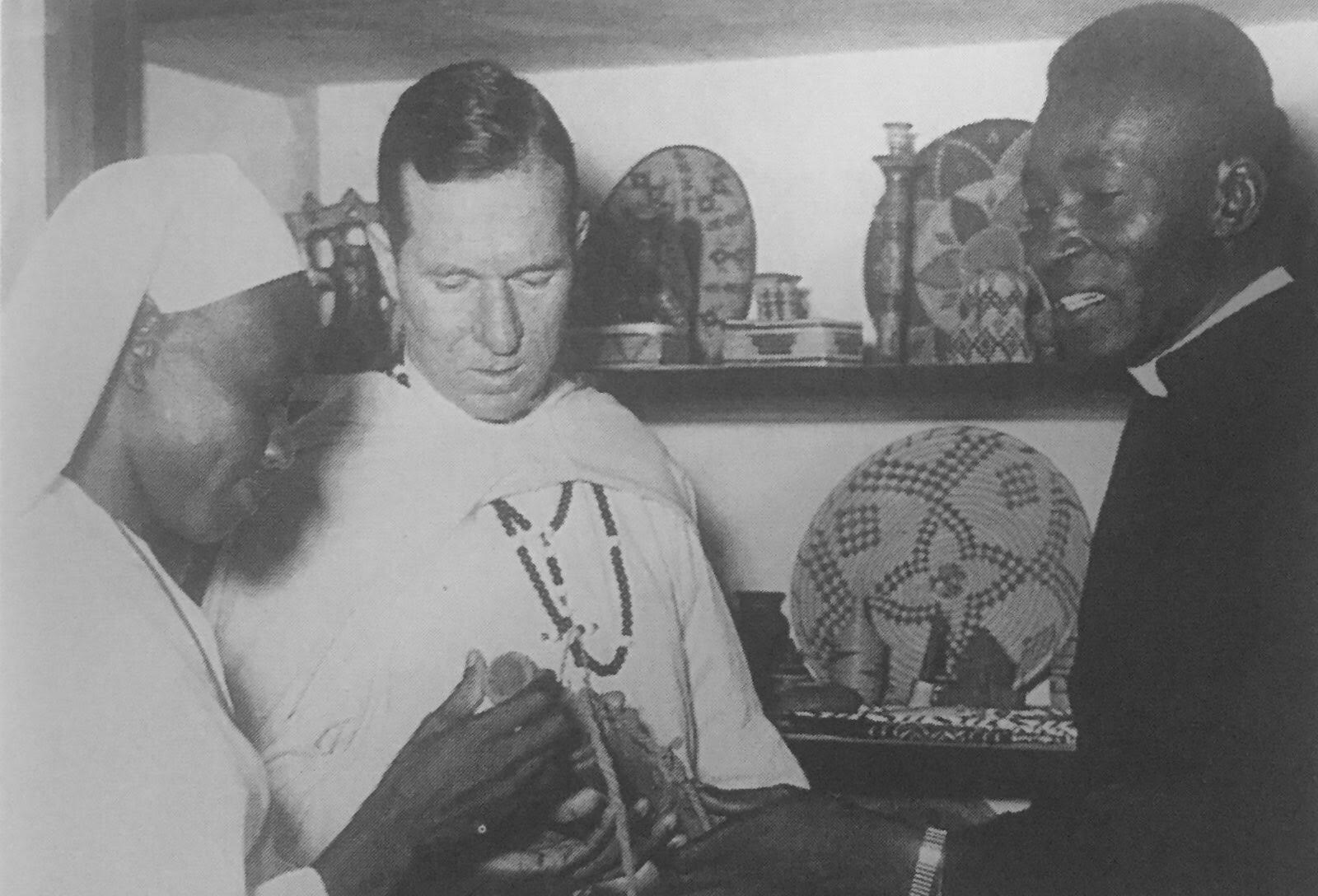
In the generalate of the Missionaries of Africa in Rome on the eve of his episcopal consecration in 1960. Alongside him was a Ghanaian nun and the priest John McNulty who was the originator of the credit union movement in Africa.

Pope John XXIII erected the Diocese of Wa on 3 November 1959 and on 16 March 1960 appointed Porekuu its first bishop. He received his episcopal consecration in Saint Peter's Basilica on 8 May from Pope John with Bishops Napoléon-Alexandre Labrie and Fulton Sheen as the co-consecrators. Porekuu was installed on 10 June. He requested permission from competent ecclesial authorities in Rome to translate the Mass into Dagaare and have it sung in local melodies with local musical instruments; having received permission, he composed the first Dagaare Mass, a milestone in the "Africanization" of the Ghanaian Church.

Porekuu attended the Second Vatican Council and focused on the involvement of the faithful as well as both education and the promotion of vocations during his tenure. He was remembered in Wa for driving a Datsun saloon car with foodstuffs from Wa to Accra on terrible roads just, so he could meet with the families of his old parishioners and to distribute food to people.

He was named the Apostolic Administrator of the Tamale in 1972 and then appointed its bishop on 18 November 1974. He was the first to hold that position who did not belong to a religious order; his predecessors had all been members of the White Fathers. When Tamale was promoted to the status of a metropolitan archdiocese on 30 May 1977, he was named its archbishop.

From 1982 to 1988, he served as the president of the Ghanaian Episcopal Conference. Porekuu attended the Synod of Bishops that Pope John Paul II convoked for 24 November to 8 December 1985, where each country had a single representative, which allowed the developing world a strong voice. He told his colleagues of the need for "enculturation", that is, "the process of adapting Catholicism to indigenous traditions". He said: "The Holy See should leave enough scope and sustain the process of inculturation to allow the young churches to grow to full maturity by taking on their own cultural identity in matters of life and worship." He attended a similar synod in October 1987.

Porekuu also served two terms on the Pontifical Council for the Laity during the pontificates of Paul VI and John Paul II. He submitted his resignation as archbishop upon reaching the retirement age in 1993. He was first told he would remain archbishop while a successor was identified; not long after Porekuu suffered a stroke his successor was named on 26 March 1994.

On a visit to Ghana in 1996, the theologian Stephen Bevans reported attending a ceremony in the Tamale cathedral "filled with music and dancing in the way only Africans can celebrate", with "the aging archbishop, Peter Poreku Dary, dancing around the altar as he incensed it in preparation for the gifts".

=== Cardinal ===
Pope Benedict XVI created Porekuu the Cardinal-Deacon of Sant'Elena fuori Porta Prenestina on 26 March 2006.

Porekuu was in a wheelchair and was lifted onto the dais to allow Pope Benedict to give him his ring.

=== Death and funeral ===
Porekuu died in his sleep at his Tamale residence on 6 March 2008. He had been bedridden for the last seven months of his life after damaging a hip in a fall in 2007. Following a vigil on 31 March at Jubilee Park, Cardinal Peter Turkson presided at his funeral on 1 April. The President of Ghana John Kufuor and Vice-President Aliu Mahama attended with Archbishop Peter Akwasi Sarpong of Kumasi offered the sermon and Felix Owusu-Adjapong, leader of the majority in parliament, delivered a tribute on the government's behalf.

== Recognition ==
Porekuu was granted several awards and recognitions during his life:

- Grand Medal (civil division) – granted on 13 January 1974.
- Honorary Doctor of Law (from his old college in Canada)
- Order of the Star of Ghana – granted in 2007.

- The new Government of Ghana led by H.E John Mahama has honored him as his face appears on the new 2 Ghana Cedis currency note in 2026 November 12.

== Beatification ==
In June 2013 at a memorial service Mass held in Tamale it was announced that the cause for beatification would be initiated with the formal request lodged to the Congregation for the Causes of Saints on 15 June 2013. The "nihil obstat" (no objections) was declared on 13 July 2013 which allowed for Porekuu to be titled as a Servant of God. The diocesan process commenced on 9 May 2015 in Tamale and was tasked with assembling documentation on his life and works as well as collecting testimonies from those who knew the late cardinal. As of June 2016 a total of 45 people had been interviewed as part of the process. Testimonies were heard in Tamale and Damongo as well as in Yendi and Navrongo-Bolgatanga with successive sessions to be heard in Wa.

The current postulator for this cause is Dr. Waldery Hilgeman.

Catholic Church titles
Preceded by None; diocese erected	Bishop of Wa; 16 March 1960–18 November 1974	Succeeded by Gregory Ebolawola Kpiebaya
Preceded by Gabriel Champagne	Archbishop of Tamale; 18 November 1974–26 March 1994	Succeeded by Gregory Ebolawola Kpiebaya
Preceded by Édouard Gagnon	Cardinal deacon of Sant'Elena fuori Porta Prenestina; 24 March 2006–6 March 2008	Succeeded by João Braz de Aviz
