= Kojo Adu Asare =

Ghanaian politician

Member of Parliament for Adenta
- Preceded by: Emmanuel Nii Ashie Moore

Personal details
- Born: 1966 30th, June Ghana
- Party: National Democratic Congress
- Children: 3
- Education: Senior high school
- Occupation: Politician; Business Executive

Kojo Adu Asare (born 30 June 1966) is a Ghanaian politician and a former member of parliament for the Adenta constituency in the Greater Accra Region of Ghana. Asare won the Adenta parliamentary seat in the 2008 general election on the ticket of the National Democratic Congress, defeating incumbent Kwadjo Opare-Hammond. The results show he polled 20,230 votes to Opare-Hammond’s 16,646.

== Early life and education ==
Asare hails from Abirim Akuapem, Eastern Region of Ghana. He is a senior high school leaver.

== Career ==
Asare is the CEO of the social corporate responsibility movement. He is also the former chief executive officer of Vital Concepts limited, which has branches in Ghana, Sierra Leone And Guinea. He served as a former general deputy secretary of the National Democratic Congress Adu Asare, who is currently a presidential staffer, is in the race with incumbent deputy general secretary, George Lawson and former director of communications at presidency, Koku Anyidoho.

In January 2012, Adu Asare lost the National Democratic Congress parliamentary primary in the Adentan Constituency to Emmanuel Nii Ashie Moore. He received 17 votes, while Moore polled 78 votes to secure the party’s nomination. Other contestants in the primary included Desmond Aryee-Boi (25 votes), Paulina Delali Adinyirah (38 votes), Alhaji Adam Mahama (six votes), Herty Laura Ken (one vote), and Samuel Anum Adjei (no votes). He is a former member of Parliament for Adentan Constituency.

In September 2025, he publicly declared his intention to contest for the National Democratic Congress’ flagbearer position ahead of the 2028 elections.

In 2025, Adu Asare publicly criticized senior National Democratic Congress (NDC) appointees for neglecting grassroots members and raised concerns over internal party support structures. He also commented on national education policy, questioning changes to the Ministry of Education’s school placement system. Asare is currently a leading member of the National Democratic Congress (NDC), and in 2025, on Asempa 94.7 FM, he stated that President John Mahama deserves a third term. This statement comes after the sitting president made it known, during an official visit to Singapore, that he would not contest for another presidential term.

== Personal life ==
Asare suffered a hip fracture in July 2024 and was bedridden. He is a Christian. He is married with three children. In 2025, he expressed affection for Daddy Lumba’s second wife, Priscilla Ofori Atta, stating that he is currently unmarried and open to marrying her after she completes her widowhood rites following her husband’s passing.
