= Mohammed Adamu Ramadan =

Ghanaian politician

Hon. Mohammed Adamu Ramadan
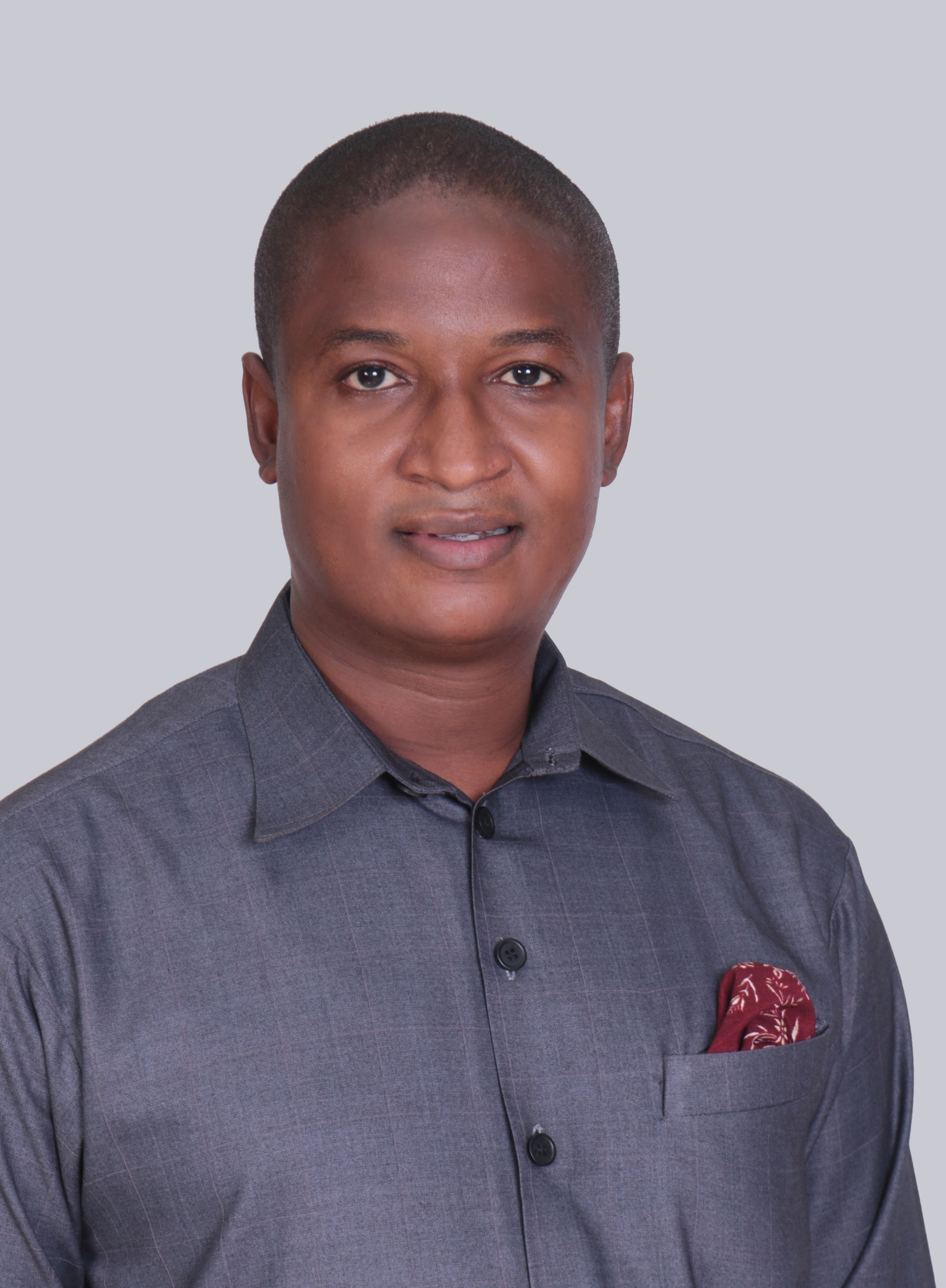

Member of Parliament for Adenta Constituency
- Incumbent
- Assumed office 7 January 2021
- Preceded by: Yaw Buaben Asamoa

Personal details
- Party: National Democratic Congress
- Spouse: Laila Ramadan
- Relations: Ahmed Ramadan (father); Samira Bawumia (sister); Abu Ramadan (brother)
- Children: Four
- Education: GIMPA
- Profession: Financial Consultant
- Committees: Business Committee and Health Committee

Mohammed Adamu Ramadan (born 3 May 1975) is a Ghanaian politician. He is a member of the National Democratic Congress. He is the member of parliament for the Adenta Constituency for the 8th parliament of the Republic of Ghana. He is the son of politician Ahmed Ramadan and the elder brother of Samira Bawumia, who served as the Second Lady of Ghana from 2017 to 2025.

== Early life and education ==
Mohammed Adamu Ramadan was born on 3 May 1975. He hails from Ashalley Botwe in the Greater Accra Region. He holds a bachelor's degree of Business Administration, a master's degree in Business Administration with specialization in Finance. He also holds a Master of Arts in Economic Policy Management.

== Career ==
Ramadan was a Special Assistant and presidential staffer at the Flagstaff House during the Presidency of John Mahama.

== Politics ==
=== Parliamentary bid ===
In the 2016 Parliamentary elections Ramadan stood for the National Democratic Congress in the Adenta Constituency and lost to the New Patriotic Party's Yaw Buaben Asamoa. Asamoa polled 33,952 votes representing 50.64% as against Ramadan's 32,588 votes which was 48.61%. He once again stood for the primaries for the NDC and won to represent them in the 2020 Elections. He won against a former Minister for Gender, Children and Social Protection, Nana Oye Lithur. He won by polling 730 votes against her 558 votes to be declared winner.

In his second bid to win the Adenta Constituency seat, he won against the incumbent member of parliament Yaw Buaben Asamoah who he contested against in the 2016 elections, He managed to poll 63,436 votes representing 55.9% as against 49,255 votes representing 43.4% by him.

In 2024, Ramadan polled 56,303 to beat the New Patriotic Party (NPP) candidate, Akosua Asaa Manu, who polled 35,143 to retain the seat he first won in 2020. This is the first time in the history of the Adenta Constituency that a Member of Parliament has been re-elected.

=== Member of Parliament ===
Mohammed Adamu Ramadan was sworn in as Member of Parliament representing the Adenta Constituency in the 8th Parliament of the 4th Republic of Ghana on 7 January 2021. He serves as a member on the Health committee and Business Committee of Parliament.

== Personal life ==
He is the first child of Ahmed Ramadan former chairman of People's National Convention (PNC) and the elder brother of Ghana's Second Lady Samira Bawumia. He is a devout Muslim. Prior to entering politics, he worked with the former national airlines Ghana Airways and Ghana International Airlines.
