= Theresa Kufuor =

First Lady of Ghana (1935–2023)

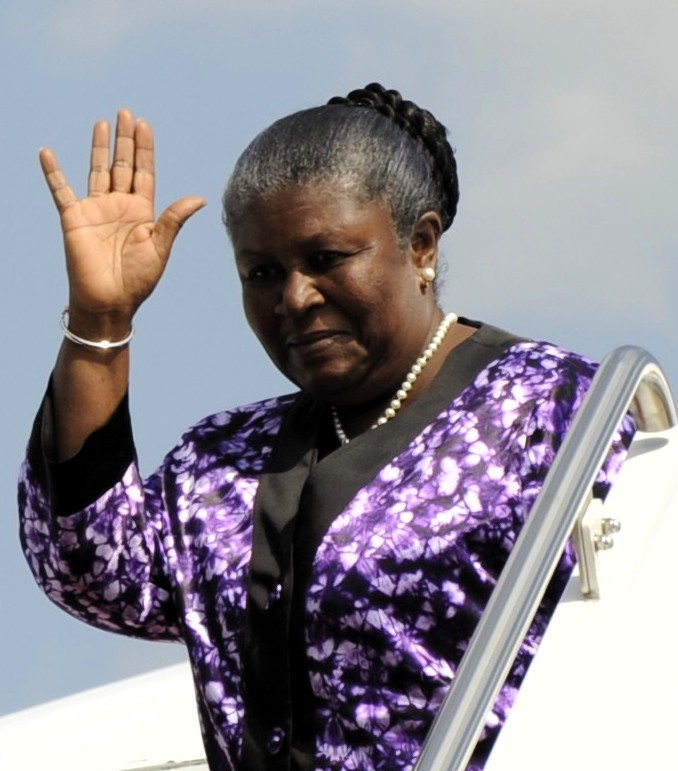
- Theresa Kufuor in 2008

First Lady of Ghana
- In role 7 January 2001 – 7 January 2009
- President: John Kufuor
- Preceded by: Nana Konadu Agyeman Rawlings
- Succeeded by: Ernestina Naadu Mills

First Lady of African Union
- In office 30 January 2007 – 31 January 2008
- President: John Kufuor
- Preceded by: Antoinette Sassou Nguesso
- Succeeded by: Salma Kikwete

Personal details
- Born: Theresa Mensah; 25 October 1935 Wenchi, Brong Ahafo, Gold Coast
- Died: 1 October 2023 (aged 87) Peduase, Ghana
- Party: New Patriotic Party
- Spouse: John Kufuor (m. 1962)
- Relations: J. H. Mensah (brother)
- Children: 5, including John Addo
- Education: University of London
- Occupation: Nurse, Midwife

Theresa Aba Kufuor (née Mensah; 25 October 1935 – 1 October 2023) was the wife of John Kufuor, the second President of the Fourth Republic of Ghana, and First Lady of Ghana from 2001 to 2009. She was a nurse and midwife.

== Early life and education ==
Kufuor, the youngest child in her family, was born Theresa Mensah on 25 October 1935. Her older brother was the economist and New Patriotic Party politician, Joseph Henry Mensah.

She started her education at the Catholic Convent, OLA, at Keta in the Volta Region of Ghana. She later went to London, where she was educated as a Registered General Nurse, in the Southern Hospital Group of Nursing. Edinburgh, Scotland.

After further study at the Radcliffe Infirmary, Oxford and Paddington General Hospital, London, she qualified as a State Certified Midwife with a Certificate in Premature Nursing.

== Personal life ==
Theresa married John Kufuor when he was at age 23 after they met at a Republic Day Anniversary Dance in London in 1961. They got married in 1962. She had five children with John Kufuor, former president of Ghana; J. Addo Kufuor, Nana Ama Gyamfi, Saah Kufuor, Agyekum Kufuor and Owusu Afriyie Kufuor. She was a mother of five, and a grandmother of eight. She was a devout Roman Catholic.

Despite being the first lady of Ghana for eight years between 2001 and 2009, she managed to maintain a low profile in the political arena. In 2007 she pushed for policy changes in the Government's white paper on Educational Reforms towards the implementation of UNESCO's Free compulsory universal basic education (FCUBE) program for kindergarten children. In 2008, she accompanied her husband on an official visit to Washington DC.

Kufuor founded the Mother and Child Community Development Foundation (MCCDF), a non-governmental organisation operating in Ghana and Canada that supports work in prevention of mother to child transmission.

=== Death ===
Theresa Kufuor died at her home in Peduase on 1 October 2023, at the age of 87.

==== Funeral Rite ====
On November 16, the funeral for Theresa Aba Kufuor, the former First Lady, took place at Accra's State House. The ceremony included hymns and tributes, followed by the transportation of her remains to Kumasi for the final stage of the three-day funeral at Heroes Park, culminating in her burial in the Ashanti Regional capital.

== Honours ==
On 25 October 2010, Pope Benedict XVI conferred on her husband President John Kufuor, the Papal Award of Knight Commander of St. Gregory the Great, for his dedicated service to mankind and the Catholic Church in general. Theresa Kufuor, on her part, was awarded the Papal Award Dame of St Gregory the Great for her commitment to the plight of poor children and their mothers.

== See also ==
- Nana Konadu Agyeman Rawlings
- First Lady of Ghana
