= Ernestina Naadu Mills =

Ghanaian former first lady

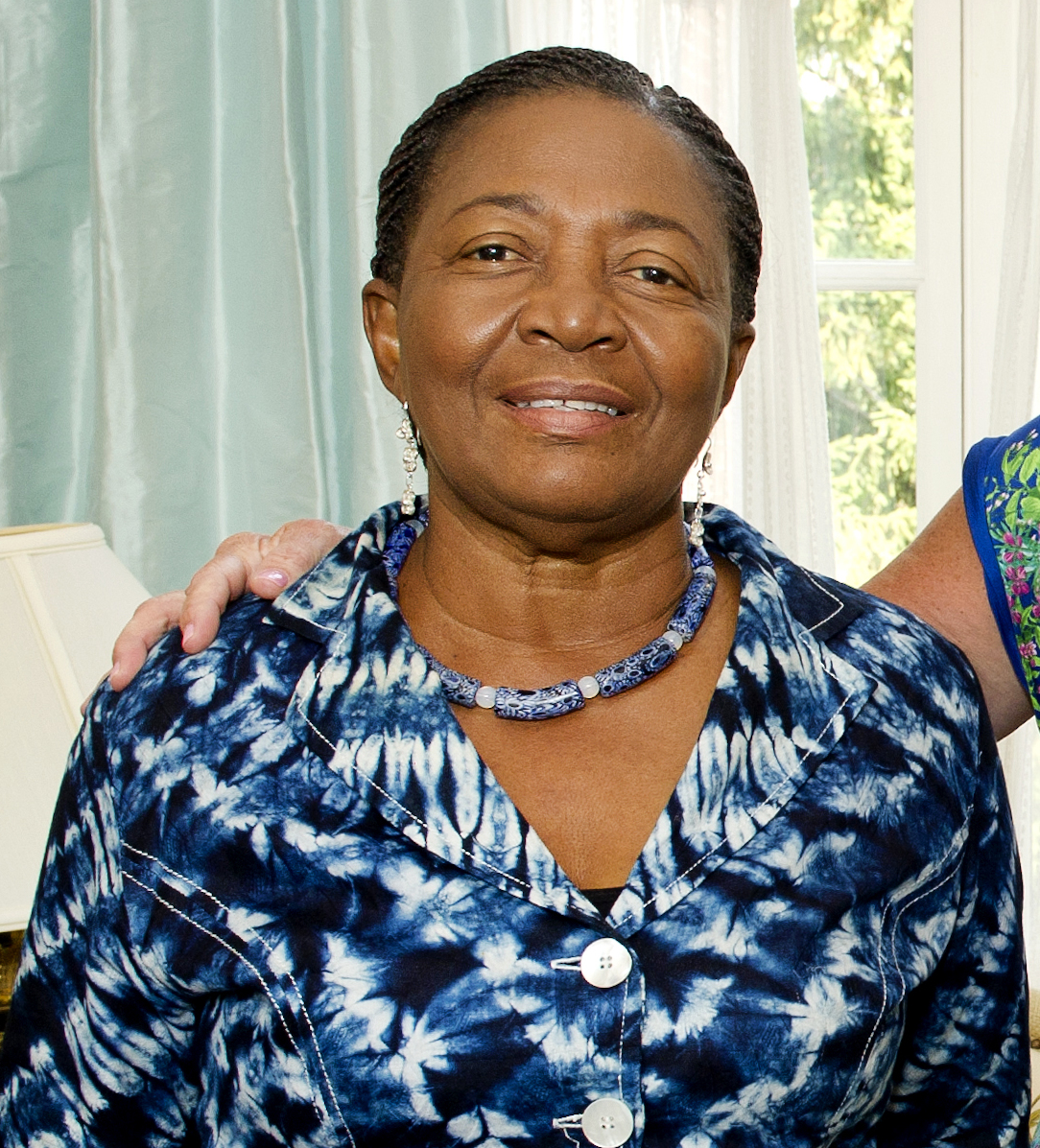
- Ernestina Naadu Mills in 2012

First Lady of Ghana
- In role 7 January 2009 – 24 July 2012
- President: John Evans Atta Mills
- Succeeded by: Lordina Mahama

Second Lady of Ghana
- In role 7 January 1997 – 7 January 2001
- President: Jerry John Rawlings
- Succeeded by: Ramatu Aliu Mahama

Personal details
- Born: Ernestina Naadu Botchway Accra, Ghana
- Party: National Democratic Congress
- Spouse: John Evans Atta Mills (died 2012)
- Education: Aburi Girl's Secondary School; Winneba Specialist Training College
- Profession: Teacher

Ernestina Naadu Mills (née Botchway) is a Ghanaian educator and former First Lady of Ghana. She was the wife of former Ghanaian president John Atta Mills (21 July 1944 – 24 July 2012), and is the recipient of a Humanitarian award from the Health Legend Foundation. She was also the Second Lady of Ghana from 1996 to 2001. She taught for 33 years, teaching in schools such as Aburi Girls' Senior High School, Achimota School and Holy Trinity Cathedral Senior High School. She has been honored in other countries and in Ghana for her contribution to children's education.

== Early life and education ==
Ernestina Naadu Botchway was born in Accra to Cornelius Teye Botchway, a cocoa businessman and Madam Alberta Abetso Abbey, both natives of Prampram a town in the Greater Accra Region. Mills attended Aburi Girl's Secondary School on a full scholarship granted by the then Cocoa Marketing Board now Ghana Cocoa Board (COCOBOD), after successfully passing her Common Entrance Examination. After receiving her GCE Ordinary Level certificate, she spent two years training as a teacher at the Specialist Training College (STC) in Winneba.

After teaching at Kototabi Mixed school for two years, she returned to STC to obtain a Diploma in Home Economics. With a desire to continuously improve herself whilst teaching, she attended the University of Ghana, Legon and completed a Bachelor of Arts degree in Sociology and Psychology. She also has a Master of Philosophy degree in sociology, specializing in Deviant Behavior and Control.

== Career ==
Upon completing her teacher training course at Specialist Training College (STC) in Winneba, she taught at Kotobabi (One) Mixed Middle School for two years. After graduating with Diploma in Home Economics, she returned to her alma mater, Aburi Girl's Secondary School to teach Home Economics, specializing in Clothing and Textile Design for nine years. She later taught at the Holy Trinity Cathedral School and Achimota School. She has taught for 33 years.

Mills also served as the Director of Education in the Greater Accra Region. In her role as director, she worked together with the Regional Director and five other district directors direct the teaching and learning process and ensure the smooth running of schools in the Greater Accra Region.

== Political roles ==
=== Second Lady of Ghana ===
In 1995, her husband, John Evans Atta Mills was selected as vice presidential running mate to Jerry John Rawlings replacing Kow Nkensen Arkaah when he, Jerry John Rawlings, ran for a second term as President of Ghana in 1996, becoming second lady when he was sworn into office on 7 January 1996. She served in that role from January 1996 to January 2001, working along with the then First Lady of Ghana Nana Konadu Agyeman Rawlings, to promote girl child education, early childhood development, education for the underprivileged and working with the aged in society.

=== First Lady of Ghana ===
When John Evans Mills was elected president of Ghana in 2009, she became the First Lady on 7 January 2009 when he was sworn into office. She served in that role from January 2009 to July 2012, working to ensure to improve the access and quality of education of underprivileged children and enhancing girl child education in Ghana. Her husband died on 24 July 2012 while in office.

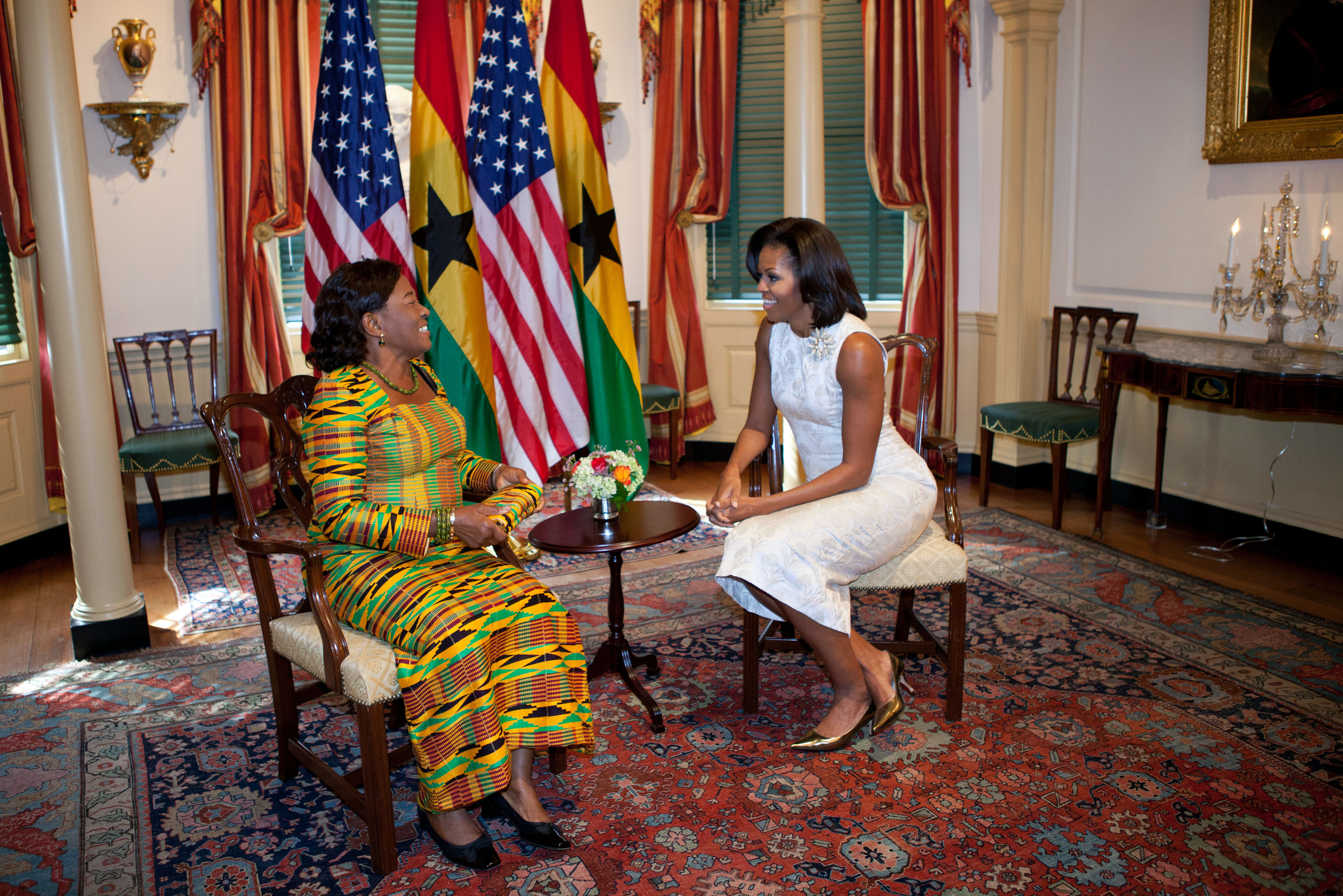
Ernestina Naadu Mills with Michelle Obama in Washington, D.C., 8 March 2012

==== Free School Uniform Initiative ====
In December 2009, Mills launched the Free School Uniform initiative in collaboration with the Ministry of Education and Ministry of Local Government and Rural Development as an initiative earmarked to distribute 1.6 million school uniforms to 77 deprived districts in Ghana. At the launch which happened at Kwao Larbie, a town in the Awutu Senya District in the Central Region, 300 school pupils from six basic schools namely; Ahentia DA Primary, Abenful DA Primary, Bontrase DA Primary, Chochoe Anglican Primary, Akrampa Anglican Primary and Kwao Larbie Anglican Primary, each received one free uniform.

==== Girl Child Activism ====
Mills being an educationist, throughout her work as both second lady and especially first lady, she was known to be an activist for the girl child and girl child education, including when she made emphatic statements on the importance of investing in girl child educationat the Crans Montana Forum in Brussels, Belgium in April 2010, she stated that;

" Investing in girl-child education has immediate and long term benefits. It does not only build the assertiveness of the girls, it also builds self-confidence and empowers them to properly position themselves to be active participants in nation building,"— "As an educationist, my joy knows no bounds when I see girls excel and as First Ladies and agenda shapers of our respective countries, we must resolve to continue to give more meaning to girl-child education and not only pay lip service to it."

==== Foundation for Child Education ====
Mills set up a Non-governmental organisation called the Foundation for Child Education Ghana (FCEG) whilst she was First Lady. The Foundation which is a community-based organization set up to promote education in the deprived, rural and poor communities in Ghana. The organisation's focus was to help put Ghana's attainment of the Millennium Development Goal 2, which sought to attain universal education by end of 2015.

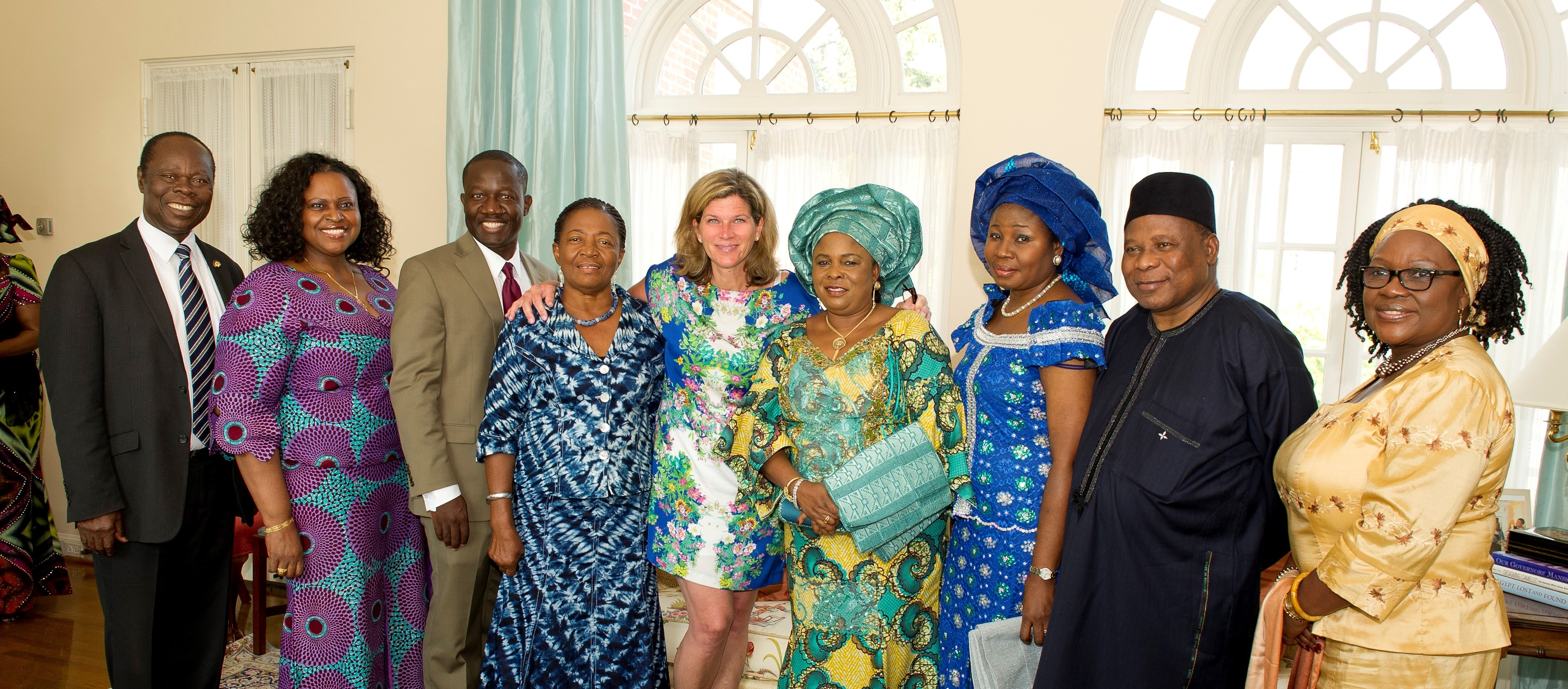
L-R (1st)Daniel Ohene Agyekum, (4th)Ernestina Mills, (5th)Katie O'Malley, (6th)Patience Jonathan in Annapolis, Maryland, 1 July 2012

Through the organisation, on 11 November 2011, she handed over a school complex she had put up in Bornikope, a coastal community in the Dangbe East District of the Greater Accra Region of Ghana to the chiefs and community leaders. The school complex consisted of two classrooms for the early childhood development section, six classrooms for the primary school and three for the junior high school (JHS) along with offices, a staff common room, an assembly hall, a computer laboratory, a clinic, a water system and a future completion of a football park with a tracking field.

==== UNESCO Youth 2012 ====
Mills represented Ghana along with the Ghana's Ambassador to the US and Mexico, Daniel Ohene Agyekum, at the UNESCO Youth Infusion Summit in Annapolis, Maryland, USA. She spoke at the conference and made calls on the need for countries to emphasize their attention on issues relating to youth development. Under her role as a first lady she spoke about youth unemployment deepening poverty in developing countries and asked for well thought through measures to be put in place to help provide jobs for the youth worldwide.

== Philanthropy work ==
=== SHS Students’ Bible Project ===
In June 2013, Mills launched the Senior High School (SHS) Students’ Bible Project, an initiative in partnership with the Scripture Union (SU) Ghana, and Tyndale Publishers where a total of 500,000 Bibles, printed by the Tyndale House Publishers in the United States (USA), at a cost of GH¢10,000, was to be shared among SHS students by the Scripture Union (SU) Ghana. The Project was initiated as a way to help imbibe spiritual and moral values needed to push the country forward into the Ghanaian youth considering an apparent decade of moral values in the Ghanaian you. Being a firm believer of the word of God she stated at that

'' My late husband and I loved God’s word and after his demise, the Bible remains my most important source of comfort and encouragement; by the word of God, you can overcome any challenge that you face in life and it will help you take responsibility of your own lives''

Through the initiative she toured the country delivering bibles to students in selected schools including Tamale Girls SHS in the Northern Region, Aburi Girls SHS in the Eastern Region, Yaa Asantewaa Girls SHS in the Ashanti Region, Achimota SHS in the Greater Accra Region, Sunyani SHS in the Brong Ahafo Region, Sekondi College in the Western Region, Bolgatanga Girls SHS in the Upper East Region, Bole SHS in Savannah Region and Wa SHS in the Upper West Region.

== Personal life ==
Ernestina Naadu Mills was married to Ghana's former president John Evans Atta Mills before he died in 2012 while in office. The couple have a son. Mills is a Christian and she worships with the Legon Interdenominational Church (LIC) located at the University of Ghana, Legon.

== Other works ==
Mills is an ardent member of the International Council on Alcohol and Addictions (ICAA), a group which educates the general public on the ill effects and consequences of using hard drugs and drinking of alcohol.

== Honours and recognition ==
Mills was awarded an honorary doctorate of humane letters degree by Goodwin College, East Hartford, in Connecticut, USA, at the school's commencement ceremony in July 2011 for devoting her life to improving the access and quality of education of underprivileged children and enhancing girl child education in Ghana.

In October 2014, she was honoured with an Eagle Award under the Honorary Legendary Award Category from the Health Legend Foundation for her work and contribution to the health sector whilst First and Second Lady of Ghana.

== See also ==
- First Lady of Ghana
- Second Lady of Ghana
- Lordina Mahama

Honorary titles
Preceded by Marian Arkaah	Second Lady of Ghana; 1996–2001	Succeeded by Ramatu Aliu Mahama
Preceded by Theresa Kufuor	First Lady of Ghana; 2009–2012	Succeeded by Lordina Mahama
