= Sabon Zongo =

Town in Accra

Coordinates: 5°33′15.588″N 0°14′5.64″W

- Nickname: Zeetown
- Interactive map of Sabon Zongo
- Country: Ghana
- Region: Greater Accra Region

Sabon Zango or Sabon Zongo is a Zongo residential town in the Greater Accra Region of Ghana. The name " Sabon Zango" has its etymology from the Hausa Language which literally means the "new settlement". The town was founded by some of the earliest Hausa settlers in Southern Ghana. It remains one of the oldest Zongo settlements in the country due to the events that led to the town's resettlement. It is also the birthplace of Ghana's current Second lady Samira Bawumia. Sabon Zango shares boundary with the Korle-Bu Teaching Hospital.

== History ==
In the early 1980s, there were an influx of migrants from the Sahel Region of West Africa to the coastal cities. Some of these settlers settled in Old Accra, near the Accra High Street. The Fulani migrants tended cows whiles the Hausa and Zarma (Zabarmawa) migrants were traders along the West African sub region. The Hausa in Accra traded kola from the hinterlands through the Jamestown Port.

Sabon Zango was founded by one of these earlier Hausa settlers, Mallam Barko, the son of Mallam Na-Inno. Mallam Na-Inno and his close associate, Mallam Garba arrived in Accra from Katsina between 1845 and 1850, primarily to spread Islam. On arrival, they lived in James Town, Ga-Mashie, in a rented house, which is traceable till this day. In March 1881, Mallam Na-Inno and Mallam Garba secured land from the chiefs and elders of Usshertown to establish the first Muslim settlement called Zangon Usshertown or Zangon Mallam. Twelve years later in 1893, Mallam Na-Inno, who was the Imam of Accra and the chief of Zangon Mallam died. He was succeeded by his son, Mallam Barko (after the resettlement to Sabon Zango), and the role of the Imam of Accra was given to Mallam Garba, Na-Inno's associate. Mallam Garba also died in 1902, shortly after he had been re-instated as the Imam of Accra by the then Colonial Governor Sir Matthew Nathan. While Mallam Na-Inno is associated with the founding of Zangon Usshertown or Zangon Mallam or present Zongo-Lane, his son, Mallam Barko, had his name attached to the founding of Sabon Zango, about 5 kilometres to the South-west of the old Zangon-Mallam in Usshertown (Zongo-Lane).

== Resettlement ==
Not long after the death of the community chief Imam (Leader of the Muslims), Mallam Na-Inno arose a succession problem among the various migrant tribes of the community. All these tribes had petitions sent to the colonialists regarding who should be the next chief Imam. After months of negotiations, the colonialists decided to let each tribe choose their own chief Imams by themselves.

The Hausas chose Alhaji Kadiri English, the Yorubas already had Chief Braimah, a popular businessman who was later married to a Tabom lady from the "Peregrino" family. The Peregrinos were freed slaves from Brazil who had settled in Jamestown. The Fulanis and Zarmas also chose their chiefs; so every ethnic group had a chief instead of one central chief overlooking the affairs of all the Muslims in the community.

The unrest did not stop, however, but continued among the Hausas because they believed that Alhaji Kadiri English, being very wealthy had used his influence to get himself made the chief and hence, there was protest by some group of the Hausas including the family of the late chief Imam Mallam Na-Inno.

To solve the issue, the Gã Mantse decided to relocate the aggrieved Hausa people to a place few miles away, which was the first properly demarcated and mapped out Zongo community. They were moved and the boundary was set right behind the Korle-Bu Teaching Hospital and Abossey Okai on the other side. Mallam Na-Inno's son, Mallam Barko was brought to set up the new community which was named Sabon Zango("New zongo") because the old zongo in Accra Central (Jamestown) still owed allegiance to the chief they were disgruntled with being Alhaji Kadiri English.

== Localities ==
- Unguwan Zabarma
- Unguwan Makafai
- Ayigbe Town
- Unguwan Liman
- Bafana-Bafana
- kan-tudu
- Makwalla (Night Market)
- Sweet Father
- Tripoli
- Monispa (Municipal)
- Unguwan Kutare
- Gaskia
- Sun-shine
- Unguwan Kutare
- Unguwan Dan-Bashir or Unguwan Kazuwa
- Dogon masallaci

== Notable people ==
- Samira Bawumia
- Osman Nuhu Sharubutu
- Ahmed Ramadan
- Kamal Sowah
