= Lordina Mahama =

First Lady of Ghana (2012–2017; since 2025)

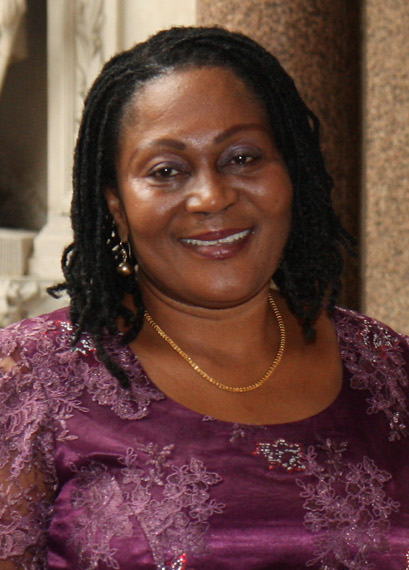
- Mahama in 2014

First Lady of Ghana
- Incumbent
- Assumed role 7 January 2025
- President: John Mahama
- Preceded by: Rebecca Akufo-Addo
- In role 24 July 2012 – 7 January 2017
- President: John Mahama
- Preceded by: Ernestina Naadu Mills
- Succeeded by: Rebecca Akufo-Addo

Second Lady of Ghana
- In role 7 January 2009 – 24 July 2012
- Vice President: John Mahama
- Preceded by: Ramatu Mahama
- Succeeded by: Matilda Amissah-Arthur

Personal details
- Born: Lordina Effah; 6 March 1963 (age 63) Nkoranza District, Brong-Ahafo Region, Ghana
- Party: National Democratic Congress
- Spouse: John Mahama (m. 1992)
- Education: Ghana Institute of Management and Public Administration; De Montfort University

Lordina Mahama (née Effah; born 6 March 1963) is the current First Lady of Ghana since January 2025. She previously served as first lady from 2012 to 2017. She is married to the President of Ghana, John Mahama. She was the Second Lady of Ghana from 2009 to 2012.

Prior to becoming Second Lady, Lordina Mahama's husband served as a member of the Parliament of Ghana representing the Bole-Bamboi constituency from 1997 to 2008.

Raised in Brong-Ahafo and Tamale in the Northern Region of Ghana, Mahama is a trained caterer and a Hospitality manager. She is a graduate of the Ghana Institute of Management and Public Administration (GIMPA), where she acquired both a degree in Hospitality Management and a Masters in Governance and Leadership. She is also a graduate of the De Montfort University in the United Kingdom.

Mahama joined her husband on campaign trails ahead of the 2008 when he was the running mate to John Atta Mills and also in both 2013 and 2017 when he was the flag bearer for the National Democratic Congress, winning in 2013 but losing in 2017.

Whilst first lady Mahama served as a role model for women in Ghana and worked as an advocate for HIV/AIDS awareness, Breast and Cervical Cancer awareness, orphans and alleged witches. She is currently the President of the Lordina Mahama foundation, a charity whose motto is "The more we share, the more we have".

== Early life ==
She was born Lordina Effah on March 6, 1963, to the late Mr. and Mrs. Effah. Lordina is from Jema-Ampoma in the Nkoranza District, located in the Brong-Ahafo Region of Ghana. She is last of three children. She had her initial training in Tamale, Ghana, at the Tishigu Anglican elementary school. She then proceeded to the Ghana Secondary School in Tamale, where she finished her GCE education. It was at Ghana Secondary School that Lordina met her future husband, John Dramani Mahama.

== Education and career ==
Mahama was a student at Flair Catering Services, and received a four-year college education in Hospitality Management at the Ghana Institute of Management and Public Administration (GIMPA) She studied for a Masters of Arts in Governance and Leadership at the Ghana Institute of Management and Public Administration (GIMPA) and graduated in 2012. Mahama graduated with a Master of Laws (LLM) in Business Law/International Business Law from the De Montfort University in the United Kingdom in 2019.

== Political roles ==
=== Second Lady of Ghana ===
Mrs. Mahama became Second Lady when her husband John Dramani Mahama, the former President of the Republic of Ghana, became the vice-president of Ghana to President John Evans Atta-Mills on 7 January 2009. She served as Second Lady until July 2012, when she became First Lady of Ghana.

=== First lady of Ghana ===
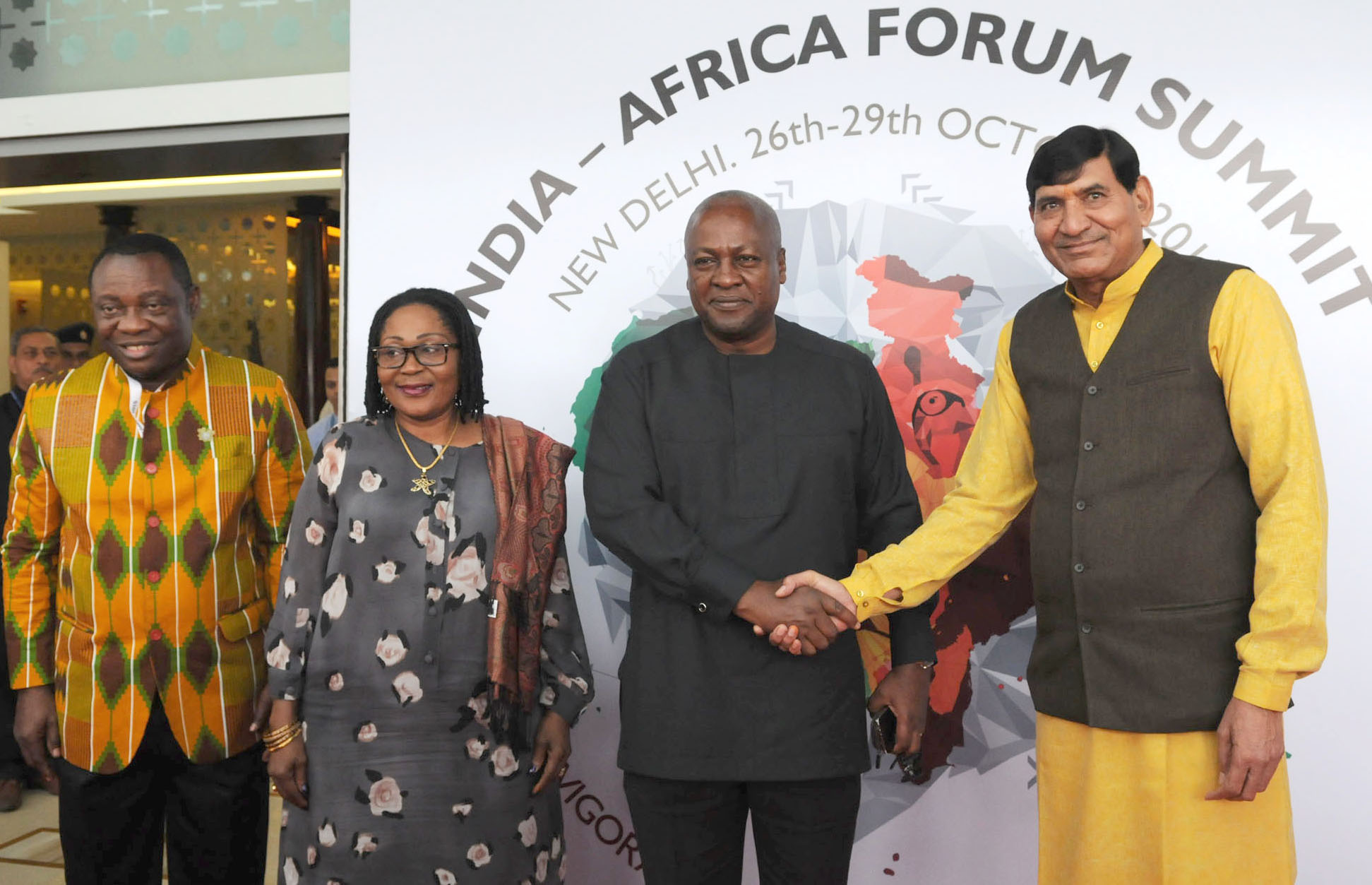
Lordina and John Mahama being received by Mohan Kundariya at the India-Africa Forum Summit in 2015

In line with Ghana's constitution, her husband became President of Ghana on 24 July 2012 on the death of his predecessor, John Atta Mills and was sworn in to Parliament in July 2012, automatically making her the First Lady of the Republic of Ghana. As First Lady she worked as an HIV/AIDS advocate, Breast and cervical cancer advocate, empowered women through her foundation and through Technical and Vocational Training (TVET) whilst also representing Ghana at different conferences and forums to discuss issues relating to women and children.

==== OAFLA ====
In her tenure as First Lady, Mahama was also elected President of the Organization of African First Ladies Against HIV and AIDS (OAFLA) in June 2015. Before that, she had served as the Vice President for the West Africa Region of OAFLA.

As President of the Organization of African First Ladies Against HIV and AIDS (OAFLA), Mahama was honored at the 50th International Women Luncheon of the Rainbow Push Coalition which took place in Chicago (USA) for her role and outstanding work in advocating for the destitute and vulnerable children in Africa and also in her role as president to empower women to take charge of their reproductive health rights, as well as end mother-to-child transmission of HIV.

==== HIV/AIDS advocacy ====
From 2013 until she left office, Mahama worked with the Ghana AIDS Commission and other agencies to bring as integrated HIV and AIDS, Sexual Reproductive health, Breast and Cervical cancer services to all the then ten regions in Ghana. The decision to include HIV and AIDS service during such health outreach programs was due to being aware that people infected with HIV were more susceptible to developing cancers. Due to that during those outreaches, the former First Lady took the opportunity to also engage directly with leaders, members of the communities she visited to advocate for more people to know their status and start early treatment. She remained a keen advocate on issues relating to HIV/AIDS whilst serving as First Lady.

==== Breast and cervical cancer advocacy ====
During her tenure, Mahama was an advocate for Breast and Cervical cancers. Through her foundation and her role as First Lady, she came up with initiatives for early detection screening of women especially within the rural areas of Ghana to ensure proper treatment if necessary.

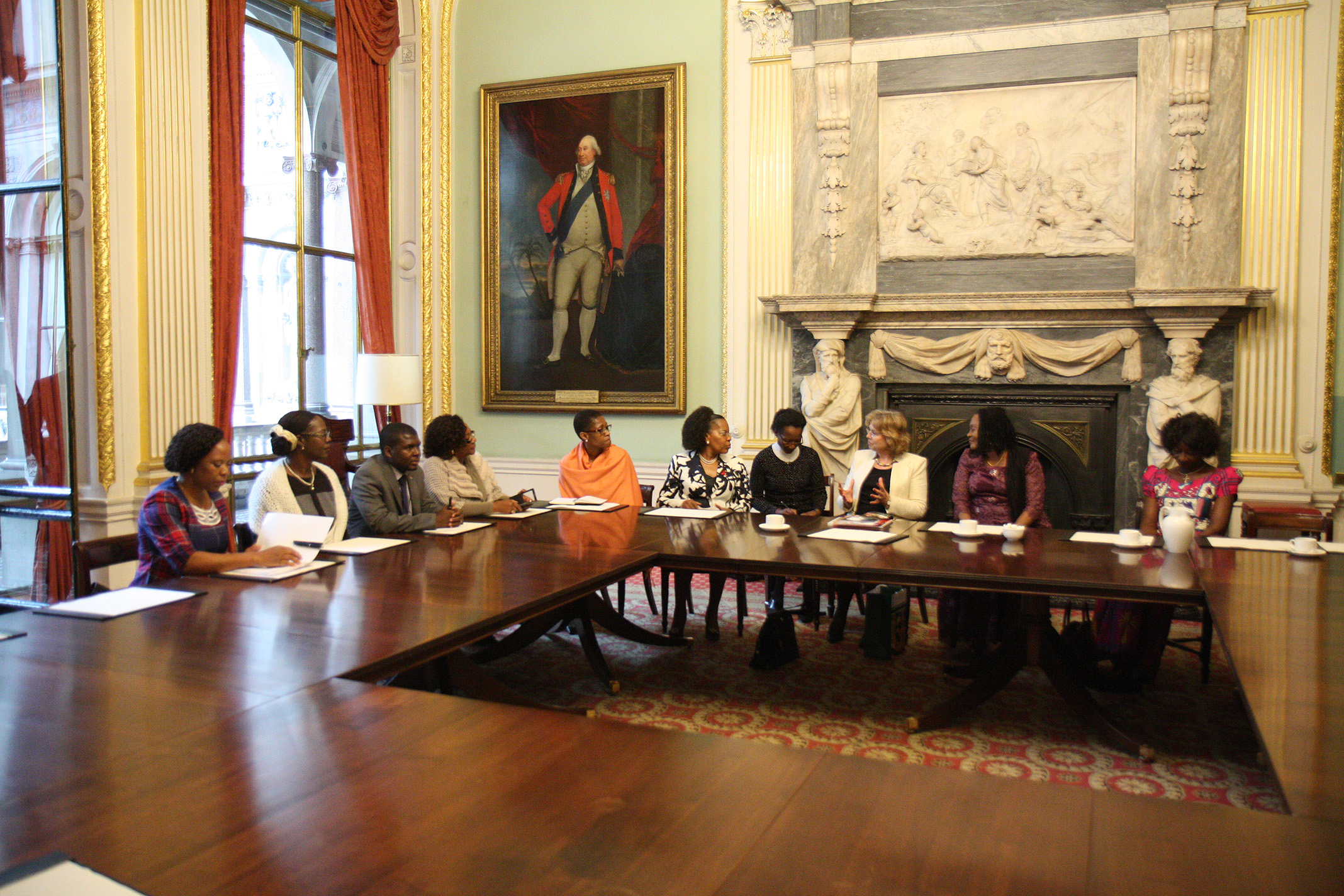
First ladies Cervical Cancer meet up with the Baroness Northover

Through her foundation and support from government and other private and non-governmental organisations, some girls in Ghana have been immunised against HPV by the GAVI vaccination initiative to prevent cervical cancer and other diseases. She considered women as being major contributors to the development of the world's economies as seen over the years and made continuous calls on non-governmental organisations to help bridge the health promotion and healthcare delivery gap in terms of cancer as they provide the main source of funding for such initiatives not withstanding governments providing healthcare funds.

She represented Ghana at the 8th, 9th, 10th and 11th Stop Cervical, Breast and Prostate Cancer conference. At the 8th conference, she announced that Ghana was going to start the implementation of a five-year National Strategy for Cancer Control to roll out various interventions that will help manage and control breast and cervical cancers, as well as other cancers in the country.

On 21 July 2015, she called on other first ladies at the 9th Stop Cervical, Breast and Prostate Cancer (SCCA) conference in Nairobi, Kenya, not to see implements as a dream but rather develop initiatives and campaigns for action to be taken to ensure early detection and to lead a planned, sustained campaign and work with related agencies and organizations to support cancer prevention and control in Africa.

Mahama made it known that approximately 2,900 women in Ghana are diagnosed with breast cancer every year and that based on the World Health Organization (WHO) findings, 6.7 million women within ages 15 and older in Ghana were estimated to be at risk at developing cervical and breast cancer, through her initiatives and the governments’, they were hoping on improving the situation in Ghana and to reduce the mortality rate of cancer by 30 percent.

Care for the underprivileged

Whilst she was First Lady, Mahama led initiatives to provide for the underprivileged within the society. Her focus was providing food items, housekeeping items, clothes, and other basic items to orphanages and ‘’witch camps’ within Ghana.

Through her foundation, she adopted six vulnerable orphanages and one witch camp in Ghana as focus facilities for her donations whilst still contributing to other orphanages. The orphanages and witch camp were made up of two in the Greater Accra Region; the Osu Children's Home in Osu and the Christ Faith Forster home in Frafraha, two in the Brong Ahafo Region; FrankMay Children's Home and Bethesda Children's Home both in Techiman, two in the Northern Region; the Tamale Children's Home and Anfaani Children's Home both in Tamale and the Gambaga Witches Camp located in the North-East Region. Over the period she served she made several donations to these orphanages and several others.

In May 2014, she visited the Gambaga Witch Camp and donated Bags of rice, utensils, pieces of clothes and other items for their up keep. She began the construction of accommodation facilities for the alleged witches at the Gambaga camp. She also visited Nyohini Children's Home and the Anfaani Orphanage in Tamale, where she interacted with the children and made donations food items including bags of rice, sugar, milk, toiletries and others for the upkeep of kids at the orphanages. She also donated Covid-19 prevention items to this camp.

In December 2016, she along with Nana Oye Lithur, the Minister of Gender, Children and Social Protection inaugurated an accommodation complex for toddlers financed by her foundation at the Osu Children's Home. She also presented food items and bales of clothes to support the children in celebrating the Christmas.

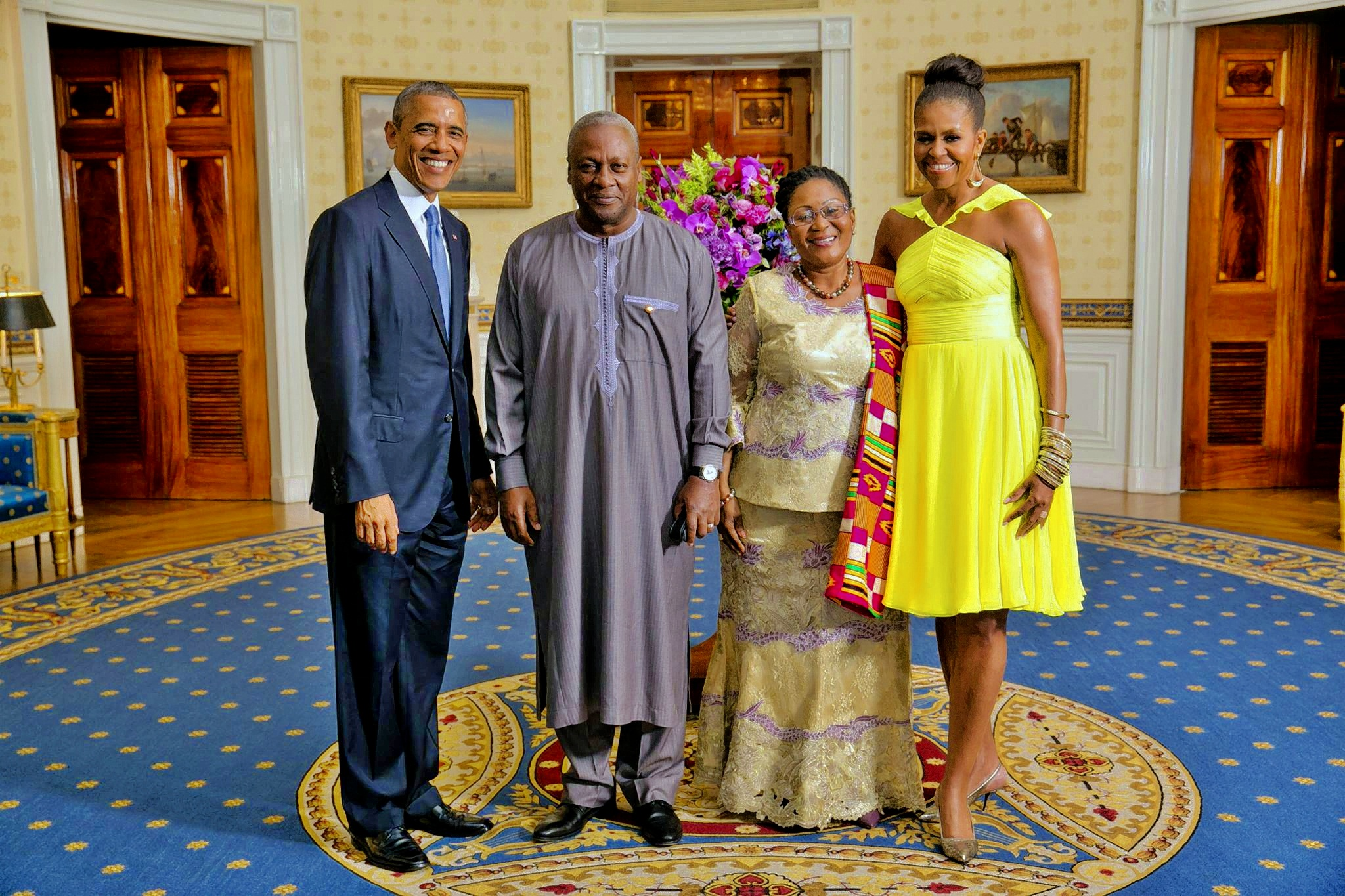
President Obama and First Lady Michelle with President John Mahama and First Lady Lordina Mahama, Blue Room during a US-Africa Leaders Summit at the White House, Aug. 5, 2014.

==== Women Empowerment through TVET ====
Through her women empowerment initiatives she adopted the Gambaga Witch Camp located in North-East Region of Ghana as a centre that needed attention. She began a training centre building project at the camp called the Gambaga Training Centre to provide vocational training and other entrepreneur skills to serve women and girls within the camp and near by communities. These skills were to help empower them and help start their own enterprises after completion. As part of the training centre she was putting up a hostel facility for students in and around Gambaga who would want to train at the centre.

She also made several donations of start-up kits to artisans across the country who had completed and graduated from vocational training centres and institutes to facilitate their entry into the business world and help them establish their own enterprises and businesses, these included donations in support with the Chinese Embassy in Ghana through their Ambassador Sun Baohong.

== Personal life ==
Lordina is married to John Dramani Mahama and together they have five children named Shafik, Shahid, Sharaf, Jesse and Farida. She speaks English, Hausa, Dagbani and Twi fluently.

== Humanitarian works ==
Her charity, The Lordina Foundation, has touched the lives of beneficiaries in different regions of Ghana. The motto of the foundation is "The more we share, the more we have". Donations are made especially around Christmas and at other periods in the year.

=== Care for Rural areas ===
In November 2024, former First Lady Lordina Mahama advocated for better healthcare access in rural Ghana at a health event in Tamale North. She emphasized the importance of regular health screenings and donated essential medical equipment to the Tishigu Health Centre through her foundation.

Tamale North MP Alhassan Suhuyini expressed appreciation, noting support from local leaders and the MP’s Common Fund in developing the center.

== Honours and recognition ==
The First Lady has a number of awards to her name and credit. These include:

- Honorary Doctor of Humane Letters, by the President and Trustees of the Fordham University.
- An award for campaign for cervical cancer, Maputo, Mozambique.
- Award for cervical cancer advocacy, Windhoek, Namibia.
- Inducted into the Global Women Leaders Hall of Fame.
- Global Inspiration Leadership Award at the Africa-Middle East-Asia summit in Dubai.
- Enstooled as Sompahemaa of the Nkoranza Traditional Area, with a stool title (Nana Akosua Fremaa Ampomah Sika I).
- Enstooled as Development Queen in Bodom in the Brong Ahafo region of Ghana.
- Enstooled as Development Queen in Ampoma in the Brong Ahafo region of Ghana.
- Enstooled as Development Queen in Anloga in Kumasi, Ashanti region of Ghana.

== See also ==
- Second Lady of Ghana
- Nana Konadu Agyeman Rawlings
- Ernestina Naadu Mills

Honorary titles
Preceded by Ramatu Aliu Mahama	Second Lady of Ghana; 2009–2012	Succeeded by Matilda Amissah-Arthur
Preceded by Ernestina Naadu Mills	First Lady of Ghana; 2012–2017	Succeeded by Rebecca Akufo-Addo
Preceded by Rebecca Akufo-Addo	First Lady of Ghana; 2025–present	Incumbent
