= First Lady of Ghana =

Wife of the President of Ghana

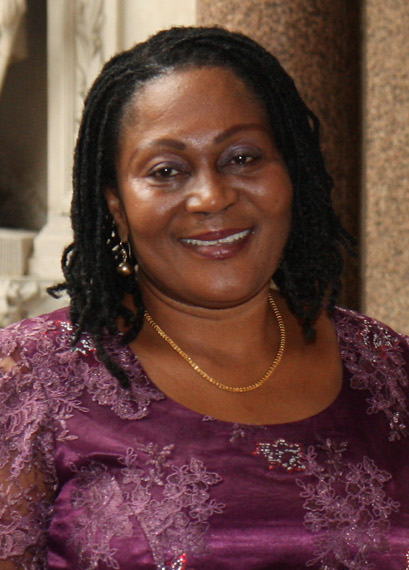
- Incumbent; Lordina Mahama since 7 January 2025
- Inaugural holder: Fathia Nkrumah
- Formation: 1 July 1960

First Lady of Ghana is the title of the wife of a sitting president of Ghana. The current first lady is Lordina Mahama, who has held the position since 2025. They are not officially given salaries but the Ghanaian first and second lady are both given clothing allowances to serve as initiatives to be comfortable enough to advocate the country through material forms of culture.

== First ladies of Ghana since independence ==
Name	Term begins	Term ends	President or Head of State
Fathia Nkrumah	1 July 1960	24 February 1966	Kwame Nkrumah
Mildred Ankrah	24 February 1966	2 April 1969	Joseph Arthur Ankrah
Christine Afrifa	2 April 1969	7 August 1970	Akwasi Afrifa
Nana Afua Frema	7 August 1970	31 August 1970	Nii Amaa Ollennu
Adeline Akufo-Addo	31 August 1970	13 January 1972	Edward Akufo-Addo
Faustina Acheampong	13 January 1972	5 July 1978	Ignatius Kutu Acheampong
Emily Akuffo	5 July 1978	4 June 1979	Fred Akuffo
Nana Konadu Agyeman Rawlings	4 June 1979	24 September 1979	Jerry Rawlings
Fulera Limann	24 September 1979	31 December 1981	Hilla Limann
Nana Konadu Agyeman Rawlings	31 December 1981	7 January 2001	Jerry Rawlings
Theresa Kufuor	7 January 2001	7 January 2009	John Kufuor
Ernestina Naadu Mills	7 January 2009	24 July 2012	John Atta Mills
Lordina Mahama	24 July 2012	7 January 2017	John Dramani Mahama
Rebecca Akufo-Addo	7 January 2017	7 January 2025	Nana Akufo-Addo
Lordina Mahama	7 January 2025	Present	John Dramani Mahama

=== Demographics ===
First Lady of Ghana	Ethnicity	Religious affiliation
Fathia Nkrumah	Egyptian	Copt
Mildred Ankrah	Ewe/Congolese	Roman Catholic
Christine Afrifa	Ashanti (Akan)	Anglican
Naa Morkor Busia		
Faustina Acheampong	Ashanti (Akan)	Roman Catholic
Emily Akuffo	Akuapem (Akan)	Presbyterian
Fulera Limann	Sissala	Roman Catholic
Nana Konadu Agyemang Rawlings	Ashanti (Akan)	Roman Catholic
Theresa Kufuor	Bono (Akan)	Roman Catholic
Ernestina Naadu Mills	Ga-Dangme	Presbyterian
Lordina Mahama	Bono (Akan)	Assemblies of God
Rebecca Akufo-Addo	Ga	Anglican

== See also ==
- Second lady of Ghana
- President of Ghana
