= Frafraha =

- Small town
- Location in Ghana
- Coordinates: 5.7252°N 0.1549°E
- Country: Ghana
- Region: Greater Accra Region
- District: Adenta Municipal District

Frafraha is a town in the Adenta Municipality in the Greater Accra Region of Ghana .

== Location ==
The town is located along the Adenta - Dodowa Road. It distance by road from Accra International Airport is 11.1 kilometers (7.52 miles).

== Politics ==
Frafraha is in the Adenta Constituency led by Hon. Adamu Ramadan. He succeeded Hon. Yaw Buabeng Asamoah of the New Patriotic Party.

== Infrastructure ==
In 2016, Frafraha Community Day Senior High School was inaugurated by former president John Mahama to enroll over 500 students. The town also has the Frafraha Health Centre.
