= Emily Akuffo =

First Lady of Ghana, 1978 to 1979

- Born: 1933/1934; Gold Coast
- Died: 8 April 2022 (aged 88); Akropong, Ghana
- Other names: Sisi Ama Oduraa (Ceci Amodraa)
- Occupation: Teacher
- Known for: First Lady of Ghana (1 July 1978 – 4 June 1979)
- Spouse: Fred Akuffo

Emily Akuffo (1933/1934 – 8 April 2022) was the wife of Lt. General Fred Akuffo, who was once Head of state of Ghana and Chairman of the Supreme Military Council military government. She was the First Lady of Ghana from 1 July 1978 to 4 June 1979. She was a teacher by profession. After the death of her husband, she spent the ensuing years in her hometown Akropong away from the public eye. Akuffo died on 8 April 2022, at the age of 88.
