= Second ladies and gentlemen of Ghana =

Wife of the vice-president of Ghana

Second Gentleman of Ghana
- Incumbent; Edmund Opoku-Agyemang since 7 January 2025
- Inaugural holder: Lily Anna de Graft-Johnson (Second Lady)
- Formation: 1 July 1960

Second Lady of Ghana or Second Gentleman of Ghana is the title given to the spouse of the vice-president of the Republic of Ghana. The current second gentleman is Edmund Opoku-Agyemang, who has held that position since 7 January 2025 when his wife Jane Naana Opoku-Agyemang was sworn into office. They are not officially given salaries but the Ghanaian first and second lady and gentlemen are both given clothing allowances to serve as initiatives to be comfortable enough to advocate the country through material forms of culture. They usually undertake social programmes and philanthropic activities especially in relation to kids and women.

== List of second ladies and gentlemen of Ghana (1979–present) ==
No	Second Lady	Portrait	Tenure		Vice President
No	Second Lady	Portrait	Took office	Left office	Vice President
1	Lily Anna de Graft-Johnson		24 September 1979	31 December 1981 (deposed.)	Joseph W.S. de Graft-Johnson
2	Marian Arkaah		7 January 1993	7 January 1997	Kow Nkensen Arkaah
3	Ernestina Naadu Mills		7 January 1997	7 January 2001	John Atta Mills
4	Ramatu Aliu Mahama		7 January 2001	7 January 2009	Aliu Mahama
5	Lordina Mahama		7 January 2009	24 July 2012	John Mahama
6	Matilda Amissah-Arthur		6 August 2012	7 January 2017	Kwesi Amissah-Arthur
7	Samira Bawumia		7 January 2017	7 January 2025	Mahamudu Bawumia
8	Edmund Opoku-Agyemang		7 January 2025	Incumbent	Jane Naana Opoku-Agyemang

=== Demographics ===
Second Lady of Ghana	Ethnicity	Religious affiliation
Lily Anna de Graft-Johnson	Fante (Akan)	Methodist
Marian Arkaah	Fante (Akan)	Methodist
Ernestina Naadu Mills	Ga-Dangme	Presbyterian
Ramatu Aliu Mahama	Dagomba	Muslim
Lordina Mahama	Bono (Akan)	Assemblies of God
Matilda Amissah-Arthur	Nzema (Akan)	Methodist
Samira Bawumia	Fulani	Muslim
Edmund Opoku-Agyemang	Ashanti (Akan)	Christian

== See also ==
- First Lady of Ghana
- Vice-President of Ghana
