= Adenta (Ghana parliament constituency) =

Constituency in Ghana

- constituency for the Parliament of Ghana
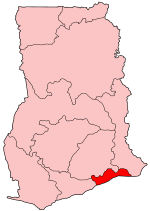
- District: Adenta Municipal District
- Region: Greater Accra Region of Ghana

Current constituency
- Created: 2004
- Party: National Democratic Congress
- MP: Mohammed Adamu Ramadan

Adenta is one of the constituencies represented in the Parliament of Ghana. It elects one Member of Parliament (MP) by the first past the post system of election. Adenta is located in the Adentan Municipal District of the Greater Accra Region of Ghana.

== Boundaries ==
The seat is located within the Adentan Municipal Assembly of the Greater Accra Region of Ghana. It was formed prior to the 2004 December presidential and parliamentary elections by the division of the old Ashaiman constituency into the new Adenta and Ashaiman constituencies.

== Members of Parliament ==
First elected	Member	Party
Created in 2004
2004	Kwadwo Opare-Hammond	New Patriotic Party
2008	Kojo Adu Asare	National Democratic Congress
2012	Emmanuel Nii Ashie Moore	National Democratic Congress
2016	Yaw Buaben Asamoa	New Patriotic Party
2020	Mohammed Adamu Ramadan	National Democratic Congress

== Elections ==
2024 Ghanaian general election: Adenta
Party	Candidate	Votes	%	±%
NDC	Mohammed Adamu Ramadan	56,303	61.26	+5.37
NPP	Akosua Asaa Manu	35,143	38.24	−5.16
CPP	Razak Al-Hassan	235	0.26	+0.08
Independent	Hagar Asiedu	232	0.25	—
Majority		21,160	23.02	—
Turnout		92,291	—	—
Registered electors		—		—

2020 Ghanaian general election: Adenta
Party	Candidate	Votes	%	±%
NDC	Mohammed Adamu Ramadan	63,436	55.89	+7.26
NPP	Yaw Buaben Asamoa	49,255	43.40	−7.22
Ghana Union Movement	Emmanuel Kwartey Quartey	599	0.53	—
CPP	Razak Alhassan	204	0.18	−0.06
Majority		6,281	12.49	—
Turnout		—	—	—
Registered electors		—		—

2016 Ghanaian general election: Adenta
Party	Candidate	Votes	%	±%
NPP	Yaw Buaben Asamoa	33,627	50.62	+4.94
NDC	Mohammed Adamu Ramadan	32,307	48.63	−3.88
PPP	Mohammed Muftao	239	0.36	−0.23
CPP	Razak Alhassan	162	0.24	−0.03
People's National Convention (Ghana)	Hummi Sinare	96	0.14	−0.02
Majority		1,320	1.99	−4.84
Turnout		67,330	64.88	−10.07
Registered electors		103,769		—

2012 Ghanaian general election: Adenta
Party	Candidate	Votes	%	±%
NDC	Emmanuel Nii Ashie Moore	35,409	52.51	−1.79
NPP	Asiam Awurabena Frances	30,805	45.68	+0.98
Independent	Mohammed Nnabaale Iddrissu	438	0.65	—
PPP	Dennis Owusu-Appiah Ofosuapea	395	0.59	—
CPP	Mamshie Omar Bawa	183	0.27	−0.73
People's National Convention (Ghana)	Hummi Sinare	108	0.16	—
NDP	Eastwood Richard Koranteng	101	0.15	—
Majority		4,604	6.83	—
Turnout		67,834	74.95	—
Registered electors		90,507		—

2008 Ghanaian parliamentary election:Adenta
Party	Candidate	Votes	%	±%
NDC	Kojo Adu Asare	20,230	54.3	+7.7
NPP	Kwadwo Opare-Hammond	16,646	44.7	−4.4
CPP	Mamshie Omar Bawa	387	1.0	−0.9
Majority		3,584	9.6	+7.1
Turnout				N/A

2004 Ghanaian parliamentary election:Adenta
Party	Candidate	Votes	%	±%
NPP	Kwadjo Opare-Hammond	17,964	49.1	N/A
NDC	Lt. Col. Joseph Kabu Davies	17,020	46.6	N/A
CPP	Patrick Offei-Addo	704	1.9	N/A
DPP	Abdul Manaf Yunus	644	1.8	N/A
PRN	Dr. David Pessey	225	0.6	N/A
Majority		644	2.5	N/A
Turnout		36,715	79.9	N/A

== See also ==
- List of Ghana Parliament constituencies
