= Zongo settlements =

Areas in West African towns

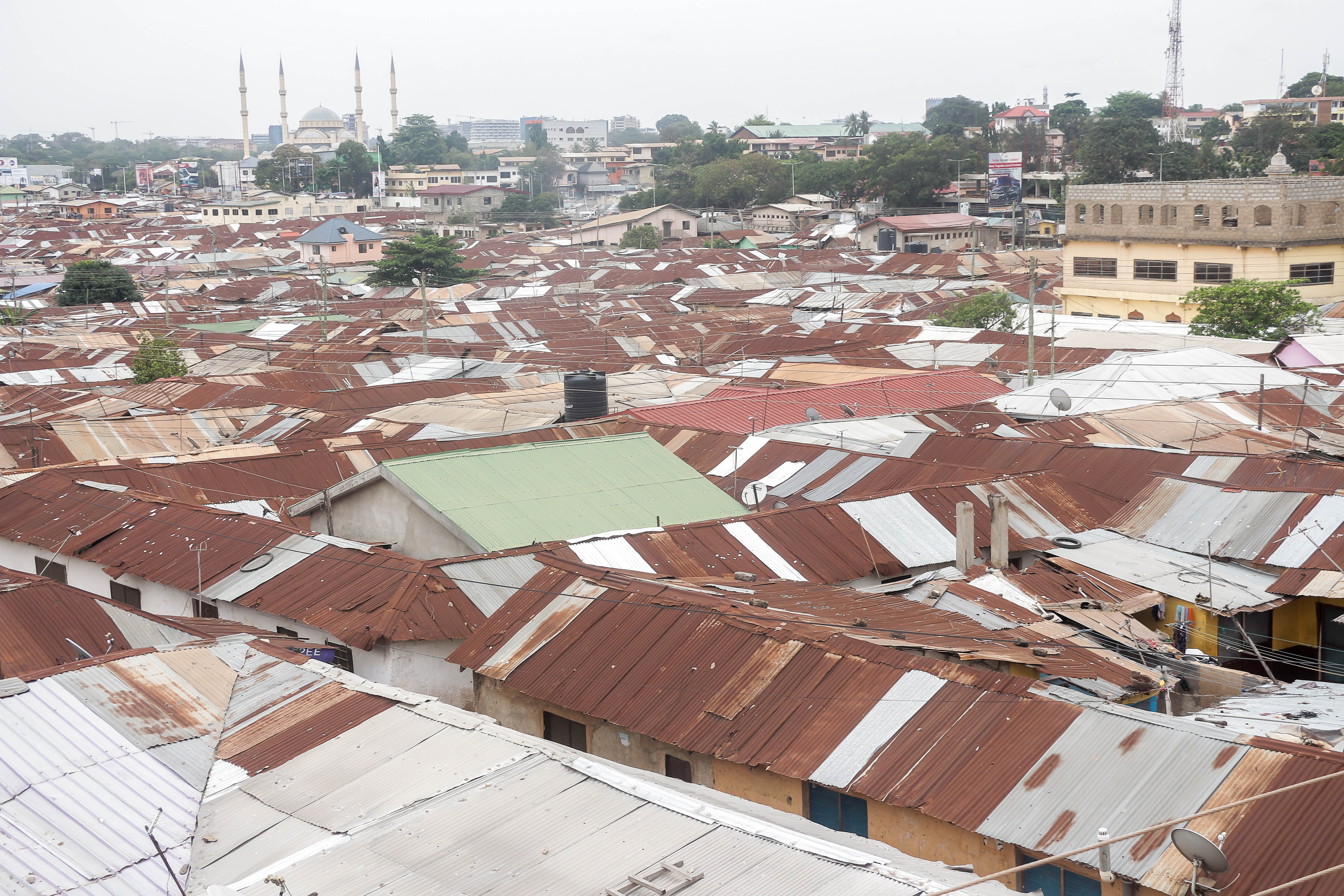
View over Nima in Greater Accra

Zongo settlements are areas in West African towns populated mostly by migrants from the northern savannah regions and the West African Sahel, especially from Niger and northern Nigeria.

Common features of the zongo communities are their use of Hausa language as lingua franca and their shared religion: Islam. The designation of these wards of migrants as zongos derives from the Hausa word zango which literally means "a camping place for trading caravans". As the name reveals, zongos were originally founded as places of trade in the long-distance trading networks that connected the West African subregion.

== By country ==
=== Benin ===
Zongo Communities are common in Benin with large settlements found in Parakou, Ganou and the port city of Cotonou.

=== Ghana ===
Collectively referred to as zongos, zongo communities are found in all 16 regions of Ghana with much denser populations in Greater Accra and the Ashanti Region.

The earliest bustling zongo communities in Ghana started in Salaga, and by the first quarter of the 19th century similar communities were already established in Tamale, Yeji and Ejisu. The largest and one of the oldest zongos close to the coastal belt started in 1810 at Ushertown (Zangon Mallam or present-day Zongo-Lane) before they were resettled at Sabon Zango followed by Nima (1836).

In the present day, zongo communities in Ghana are a microcosm of people from the lower and middle classes from both northern and southern Ghana as well as immigrants from neighboring countries including Benin, Burkina Faso, Ivory Coast, Mali, Niger, Nigeria, and Togo. This has made the Zongo communities in Ghana a very multicultural and multiethnic mosaic of Sahalian communities like the Hausas, Fulanis, Tuaregs, Zarmas, Mossi, and other diverse ethnic groups originating from the Sahel region and native ethnic groups hailing from Northern Ghana.

The Hausa from northern Nigeria and Southern Niger were the pioneer settlers of the zongos. The early settlers constructed makeshift houses with the intention to work hard, raise some capital and return to their locality. As it has usually been with immigration, many adopted their new found place as their permanent home.

== See also ==
- Ghanaian Zongo people
- Sabon Zango
- Northerner (Ghana)
