= Samira Bawumia =

Second lady of Ghana from 2017 to 2025

Sami Bawumia
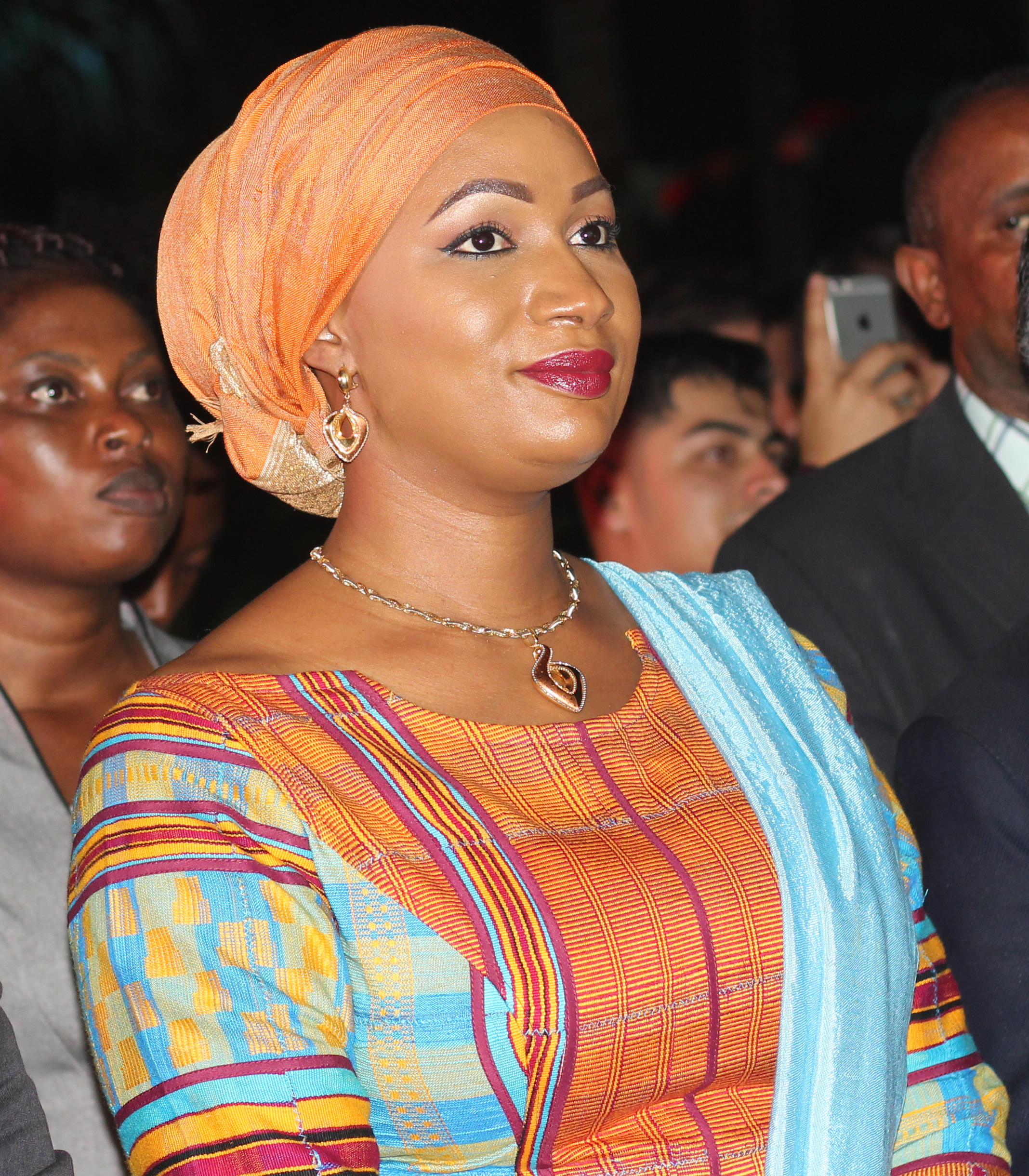

Second Lady of Ghana
- In role 7 January 2017 – 7 January 2025
- Vice President: Mahamudu Bawumia
- Preceded by: Matilda Amissah-Arthur
- Succeeded by: Edmund Opoku-Agyemang (as Second Gentleman)

Personal details
- Born: Samira Ramadan; 20 August 1980 (age 46) Sabon Zango, Accra, Ghana
- Citizenship: Ghana
- Spouse: Mahamudu Bawumia
- Parents: Ahmed Ramadan (father); Ayesha Ramadan (mother)
- Education: Answarudeen Islamic School; Akosombo International School; Mfantsiman Girls' Secondary School; Kwame Nkrumah University of Science and Technology; Ghana Institute of Management and Public Administration; University of London
- Occupation: Politician; philanthropist; advocate
- Known for: Samira Empowerment & Humanitarian Projects (SEHP)
- Religion: Islam
- Ethnicity: Fulani
- Website: https://sbawumia.org

Samira Bawumia (née Ramadan, born 20 August 1980) is a Ghanaian politician who served as the Second Lady of Ghana from 2017 to 2025. She is married to former Vice-President of Ghana, Mahamudu Bawumia. She received the Ghanaian Women Association of Georgia Global Humanitarian Award, an honor from the Atlanta City Council, and is also recognized by the Macon Bibb country. She graduated from the University of London with a bachelor’s degree in law.

== Early life ==
Bawumia was born in 1980 and is the only daughter of Alhaji Ahmed Ramadan, the former National Chairman of the People’s National Convention (PNC), and Hajia Ayesha Ramadan.

== Education ==
Bawumia began her early education at the Answarudeen Islamic School at Fadama and moved to Alsyd Academy in Dzorwulu, Accra. She continued her studies at Akosombo International School (AIS) and attended senior secondary education at Mfantsiman Girls' Secondary School at Saltpond in the Central Region of Ghana.

Bawumia holds a Bachelor of Arts degree, Social Science in law, Sociology and Technology from the Kwame Nkrumah University of Science and Technology (KNUST). At the Ghana Institute of Management and Public Administration (GIMPA) where she took her postgraduate studies, she was awarded the Best Student in Master of Business Administration (MBA) in the year 2012.

In March 2023, Bawumia announced on her Instagram handle with graduation photos that she has graduated from the University of London, UK with a Bachelor's degree in Law. She indicated that despite the COVID-19 pandemic, she took advantage of the online programme offered by the UK institution by enrolling in a law degree.

She is multi-lingual, fluent in Hausa language, Fulani, Ewe, the Ga language, Twi, Fanti, and Mampruli Language .

== Humanitarian initiatives ==
Samira Bawumia is the founder and CEO of the Samira Empowerment & Humanitarian Projects (SEHP), described as a not-for-profit organization established with the purpose of empowering the underprivileged in Ghana through diverse social intervention projects to improve lives. In November 2019, she donated library books to Police Basic Schools in the country to inculcate the habit of reading in children. This was an initiative of her 'Library in the box' project which has the objective of making books available to schools. She also started the Samira Bawumia Literature Prize to encourage and honour writers and creatives between the ages of 15 and 25. The first winners of the scheme were crowned at the Fitzgerald in Accra on Monday, 27 July 2020.

The SEHP is also committed to empowering women. The organization has championed visions, andinvested in educating and empowering women. One notable project was "Needles4Girls", where she enrolled about 2,500 girls into fashion schools across the country with the aim of empowering them by providing them with decent means of livelihoods. She also donated 3,000 Ghana cedis each to 70 women in the Greater Accra Region of Ghana to support their trading activities. Bawumia believes in giving women opportunities, and empowering them in making a difference in the economy of Ghana.

== Politics ==
Samira Bawumia became prominent on the political scene when her husband, Mahamadu Bawumia, was the running mate of the candidate Nana Akufo-Addo of the New Patriotic Party (NPP) in the 2016 election. Since then she has been a constant feature, supporting her husband who was following the electoral victory in that election and became the Vice President of Ghana. The NPP was re-elected in 2020 and Samira's husband was sworn in as Vice President for a second term.

Months leading to the 2020 elections as Second Lady of the Republic, she was seen on the campaign trail across the country urging voters to vote for the New Patriotic Party and her husband as Vice-President for a second term, as well as calling the NPP party to unity in the upcoming elections to retain victory.

In 2021, Bawumia and the First Lady of the Republic of Ghana, Rebecca Akufo-Addo, rejected new emoluments for Article 71 office holders which included the spouses of Vice-President and President of the Republic of Ghana. They refunded all salaries previously paid to them since 2017.

In May 2023, Bawumia and the NPP stormed Kumawu to campaign for the Member of Parliament aspirant on the party ticket to win the seat.

== Recognition ==
In 2018, Bawumia was made an ambassador for the Global Alliance for Clean Cookstoves and joins the late former UN Secretary General Kofi Annan, Academy Award-winning actor Julia Roberts, and Grammy-nominated Ghanaian musician Rocky Dawuni to work with the Alliance and its partners to raise awareness of household air pollution, and encourage broader adoption of clean cooking solutions in developing countries in a bid to create cleaner environments and eradicate deaths caused by pollution from the burning of solid fuels for cooking.

The African Women of Excellence Awards, a scheme organized by the African Union in partnership with the Diasporan African Forum (DAF), recognized Bawumia on 29 September 2018, in Sandton City-Johannesburg, South Africa, for her contribution to peace within social, political, and economic spheres.

In 2019, she was acknowledged as the first of seven individuals honored by Sustainable Energy for All in conjunction with Ashden. This was in recognition of her efforts towards the United Nations' Sustainable Development Goal 7, which is to ensure access to modern reliable, renewable, and affordable energy for all by 2030.

At the 7th Annual Maternity Fundraising Gala of the Ghanaian Women Association of Georgia, Bawumia was honored with three awards for her humanitarian activities and interventions. The awards included the Macon-Bibb County Award, the GWAG Humanitarian Award, and the Atlantic City Council Award presented by the Mayor of the County, Lester Miller.

In 2023, Bawumia was one of the Keynote speakers at the World Biogas Summit held in Birmingham, United Kingdom.

== Personal life ==
Bawumia is married to former Vice President of Ghana, Mahamudu Bawumia, and they have 4 children. She gained widespread attention during the 2016 Ghanaian Parliamentary and Presidential election season. She advocated against corruption and the ineffective administration of state resources.
