= Yaw Buaben Asamoa =

Ghanaian politician (born 1964)

Member of the Ghana Parliament for Adenta constituency

Personal details
- Born: 16 September 1964 (age 62) Sekyedumasi Ashante Region, Ghana
- Party: New Patriotic Party
- Children: 3
- Education: University of Ghana; Ghana School of Law
- Occupation: Lawyer

Yaw Buaben Asamoa (born 16 September 1964) is a Ghanaian politician and former member of the Seventh Parliament of the Fourth Republic of Ghana representing the Adenta Constituency in the Greater Accra Region on the ticket of the New Patriotic Party. He is currently the Special Advisor for the Movement for Change led by Alan Kwadwo Kyeremanteng.

== Education ==
He earned an LLB from the University of Ghana, a BL from the Ghana School of Law, a Professional Executive Certificate from the Institute of Paralegal Training and Leadership, a Postgraduate Certificate from GIMPA, and a Certificate from Harvard University

== Work. ==
From 2003 to 2005, Yaw Buaben Asamoa worked for the Ghanaian government as a programme officer. From 2005 to 2006, he served as the late Alhaji Aliu Mahama's senior special assistant.

== Politics ==
Yaw Buaben Asamoa was a member of the New Patriotic Party and represented the Adenta constituency in the Greater Accra Region in the Seventh Parliament of the Fourth Republic of Ghana.

=== 2016 election ===
Asamoa contested the Adenta constituency parliamentary seat in Greater Accra on the ticket of the New Patriotic Party during the 2016 Ghanaian general election and won with 33,952 votes, representing 50.64% of the total votes. He was elected over Mohammed Adamu Ramadan of the National Democratic Congress, Alhaji Mohammed Muftao of the PPP, Alhaji Razak Alhassan of the Convention People's Party, Hummi Sinare of the PNC. They obtained 32,588 votes, 244 votes, 163 votes and 96 votes respectively, equivalent to 48.61%, 0.36%, 0.24% and 0.14% of the total votes respectively.

==== 2020 election ====
Asamoa again contested the Adenta parliamentary seat on the ticket of the New Patriotic Party during the 2020 Ghanaian general election but lost to Mohammed Adamu Ramadan of the National Democratic Congress.
