= Logba Adzekoe =

- Interactive map of Logba Adzekoe
- Coordinates: 6.8999°N 0.4342°E
- Country: Ghana
- Region: Volta Region

Government
  - Queen-mother: Matilda Amissah-Arthur

Logba Adzekoe is a town in the Volta Region of Ghana. The town is known for the Jim Bourton Memorial Agriculture Secondary. The school is a second cycle institution. Matilda Amissah-Arthur has been installed as a queen mother of Logba-Adzakoe in 2016.
