= Nana Afua Frema =

Former First Lady of Ghana

Afua Frema Busia
- Born: Afua Frema Busia Gold Coast
- Died
- Known for: First Lady of Ghana
- Spouse: Nii Amaa Ollennu

Nana Afua Frema Busia was the Queen mother of Wenchi, and the First Lady of Ghana from 7 August 1970 to 31 August 1970. She was the sister of Kofi Abrefa Busia, formerly Prime Minister of Ghana.
