= Kwadwo Opare-Hammond =

Ghanaian politician (died 2019)

Hon. Kwadwo Opare-Hammond

Member of Parliament for Adansi Asokwa Constituency
- In office 7 January 2005 – 6 January 2009
- President: John Kufuor
- Preceded by: New Constituency
- Succeeded by: Kojo Adu Asare

Personal details
- Died: 11 January 2019
- Party: New Patriotic Party
- Education: De Montfort University
- Profession: Administrator, Pastor

Kwadwo Opare-Hammond was a Ghanaian politician. He was the Member of Parliament representing the Adenta constituency of the Greater Accra Region in the 4th Parliament of the 4th Republic of Ghana. He was a member of the New Patriotic Party.

== Education ==
Opare Hammond attended the De Montfort University. From that university he obtained a Master of Laws in International Human Rights Law.

== Career ==
From there, he was an Administrator and Pastor by profession. He also became The managing director of the Precious Minerals Marketing Company (PMMC). He was appointed MD of the mineral trading firm in 2017.

== Political career ==
In 2004, he became the first Member of Parliament for Adenta Constituency after the constituency was separated from the Ashaiman Constituency. Kwadwo Opare-Hammond was a member of the New Patriotic Party. He became a member of parliament from January 2005 after emerging winner in the 2004 Ghanaian general election. He was the MP for Adenta constituency, and his term ended in January 2009 after the dissolution of the parliament. In 2014, Opare-Hammond was relieved of his post as Director of Finance and Administration of the New Patriotic Party following allegations of financial impropriety and disobedience to then National Chairman, Paul Afoko.

=== 2004 Elections ===
He was elected with 16,646 votes this was equivalent to 44.7% of the total valid votes cast. He was elected over Joseph Kabu Davies of the National Democratic Congress, Patrick Offei Addo of the Convention People' s Party, Abdul-Manaf Yunus of the Democratic People's Party and David Pessey of the National Reform Party. These obtained 17,020votes, 704votes, 644votes and 225votes respectively of the total valid votes cast. These were equivalent to 46.6%, 1.9%, 1.8% and 0.6% of the total valid votes cast. Opare-Hammond's constituency was a part of the 17 constituencies won by the New Patriotic Party in the Greater Accra region in that elections. In all, the New Patriotic Party won a total 128 parliamentary seats in the 4th parliament of the 4th republic of Ghana.

== Personal life ==
Kwadwo Opare-Hammond was a Christian.

== Death ==
Kwadwo Opare-Hammond is reported to have died on 11 January 2019 at the Korle-Bu Teaching Hospital after a short illness.
