= Good neighborliness =

Principle of international law

Good neighborliness is a general principle of international law with particular importance for the field of international environmental law. The principle "obligates states to try to reconcile their interests with the interests of neighboring states", and found expression in a number of 20th Century international legal rulings, most notably the Trail smelter arbitration between the United States and Canada.
