= Matilda Amissah-Arthur =

Second Lady of Ghana from 2012 to 2017

Second Lady of Ghana
- In role 6 August 2012 – 7 January 2017
- Vice President: Kwesi Amissah-Arthur
- Preceded by: Lordina Mahama
- Succeeded by: Samira Bawumia

Personal details
- Born: Matilda Nana Manye Borsah
- Party: National Democratic Congress
- Spouse: Kwesi Amissah-Arthur
- Education: Mfantsiman Girls Secondary School, Cape Coast

Matilda Nana Manye Amissah-Arthur (née Borsah) served as the Second Lady of Ghana from 2012 to 2017. She was married to the late former Vice President of Ghana, Kwesi Amissah-Arthur.

== Early life and education ==
Her father was the Director of Social Welfare and instrumental in founding Osu Children's Home, an orphanage for homeless children and orphans in Osu, Accra as well as the Borstal Institute for juvenile delinquents in the country. Mrs. Amissah-Arthur attended Mfantsiman Girls' Secondary School in Central Region of Ghana for her secondary school education.

== Career ==
Amissah-Arthur is a retired librarian by profession. She has worked with public library, the Balme Library, University of Ghana and the British Council.

=== Second Lady of Ghana ===
As Second Lady, Amissah-Arthur is well known for her role in promoting literacy, digital libraries, and other beneficial causes in Ghana, including donation of medical items, and supporting fishmongers in the town of Effutu. Amissah-Arthur was influenced to do social work by her father, who was once Director of Social Welfare in Ghana and inculcated the habit of selflessness and hardwork in his children. She has been installed as a Queen Mother of Logba-Adzekoe in 2016, with the stool name of Unandze Afan Eshi (Mamaga Afeamenyo I).

=== Writing ===
She spends her time writing children's books and working with the bereaved: widows, widowers and their children, to help them find purpose through their pain. These include: In Times Like These, Fun with Colouring: Animals and their Babies, Writing Book – The Alphabet.

== Personal life ==
She was married to former vice president of Ghana and former governor of the Bank of Ghana, Kwesi Amissah-Arthur and they had two children. He died on 29 June 2018 at the 37 Military Hospital.
