= John Addo Kufuor =

Ghanaian businessman

- Occupation: Businessman
- Known for: Son of the former President, John Kufuor

John Addo Kufuor, also known as Chief Kufuor, is a Ghanaian businessman and the son of the former president, John Kufuor.

He worked as a management consultant and senior manager at PricewaterhouseCoopers, Africa Office from January 2002.

In 2006, he and his father were cleared of corruption in the purchase of a hotel in Accra. In April 2016, he was listed in a leaked confidential document revealing his use of tax havens in Panama to hide his wealth.
