= Rebecca Akufo-Addo =

First Lady of Ghana from 2017 to 2025

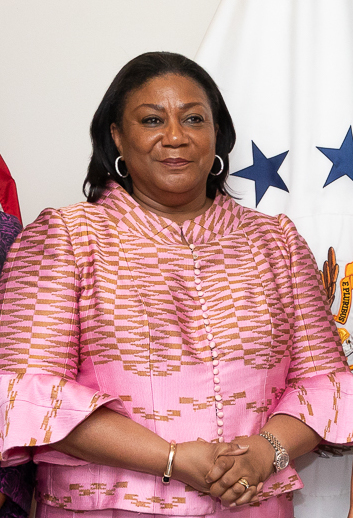

First Lady of Ghana
- In role 7 January 2017 – 7 January 2025
- President: Nana Akufo-Addo
- Preceded by: Lordina Mahama
- Succeeded by: Lordina Mahama

Personal details
- Born: Rebecca Naa Okaikor Griffiths-Randolph; 12 March 1951 (age 75)
- Spouse: Nana Akufo-Addo (m. 1997)
- Children: 5
- Parents: Jacob Hackenburg Griffiths-Randolph; Frances Phillipina Griffiths-Randolph
- Education: Wesley Grammar School; Achimota School
- Known for: Rebecca Akufo-Addo Foundation

Rebecca Naa Okaikor Akufo-Addo (née Griffiths-Randolph; born 12 March 1951) is a Ghanaian public figure who served as the First Lady of Ghana from 2017 to 2025. She is married to former President Nana Akufo-Addo.

She is known for her devotion to advocacy and fight against Malaria. She has been recognized as a champion of nutrition in her fight against malnutrition in children and adolescents, and for her outstanding contribution to women's health and efforts against infant mortality in Ghana and across Africa. In 2017, she established the Rebecca Akufo-Addo foundation, a non-governmental organization, with a mission to enhance efforts of the government among Ghanaian women and children.

== Early life ==
Rebecca Naa Okaikor Griffiths-Randolph was born on the 12 March 1951 as the daughter of the judge, Jacob Hackenburg Griffiths-Randolph who served as the Speaker of the Parliament of Ghana in Third Republic and Frances Phillipina Griffiths-Randolph (née Mann). She attended Achimota Primary School and Wesley Grammar School, both in Accra.

== Career ==
Rebecca Akufo-Addo furthered her education at the Government Secretarial School where she qualified as a secretary. She worked as a secretary at Merchant Bank in Ghana and later relocated to United Kingdom. She also worked as a legal secretary for Clifford Chance/Ashurst Morris Crisp, multinational law firms in the United Kingdom.

== First Lady of Ghana ==
In November 2016, she made a donation of bags of rice, cartons of Milo, gallons of cooking oil, bags of sugar, boxes of noodles, toiletries, detergents, boxes of tooth paste and cartons of drinks to the Accra Psychiatric Hospital. This was to help with personal hygiene of the inmates. In 2017 and 2020, she donated food items to Ga-Mashie and Tema Traditional Councils respectively to support in the celebration of their annual Homowo festival.

In August 2020, Rebecca Akufo-Addo made a donation of $20,000 to help Emmanuel Apraku, a pencil artist, treat a liver disease he was battling. In the same month, she donated temperature guns to the Ghana Library Board to be shared to the libraries across the country. This was to help curb the spread of the COVID-19 pandemic by checking the temperatures of people who came to use the libraries. In September 2020, she donated some items to the University of Ghana Teaching Hospital. The items included five beds sets, powdered soap, baby diapers, blankets, bed sheets, patient monitors, thermometer guns, 20 gallons of hand sanitizer, nose masks and delivery bowls.

=== Malaria ===
Rebecca Akufo-Addo is an advocate of fighting the disease, Malaria, in Ghana. Through the Infanta Malaria, of which she is patron and her foundation, the Rebecca Akufo-Addo foundation. Akuffo-Addo has been advocating for improved health outcomes for the vulnerable groups, who are mostly affected by malaria including the poor, pregnant women and children under five years old. She is also a member of the National Malaria Control Programme and the Ghana Health Service which commemorates World Malaria Day. In 2019, she started the "Zero Malaria Starts with Me" campaign to fight Malaria in Ghana and strongly backs the Pan-African ‘Zero Malaria Starts with Me’ movement, which calls for the removal of malaria across Africa.

=== Nutrition ===
Akufo-Addo is a nutrition champion in Ghana. She raises awareness to fight against malnutrition, especially in children and adolescents. In 2019, she called for a thoughtful national policy on nutrition education for school curricula, public education, promotion of healthy diets, and proper labeling of food products, which is geared towards improving nutritional habits of Ghanaian. She charged The National Development Planning Commission (NDPC) to take a key role in coordinating and accelerating policies that supported healthy diets to ensure coherence with other actors in the food system. In 2019, she launched a campaign to raise awareness on iron deficiency in Ghana as the country joined the world to observe World Food Day. For her works on nutrition, Akufo-Addo was honoured by The African Leaders for Nutrition to acknowledge her work and commitment to sound nutrition and the welfare of mothers and babies. She was given the 'Excellence in Empowering Women and Children Award' at the Africa Public Sector for her outstanding contribution to women's health and efforts against infant mortality in Ghana and across Africa in Rwanda.

=== Rebecca Akufo-Addo Foundation ===
In 2017, she founded the Rebecca Akufo-Addo foundation, a non-governmental organization to enhance efforts of government amongst Ghanaian women and children. In November 2017, the Rebecca foundation signed a deal with Licang District Experimental School in Qingdao, China. This was for an exchange program that would each year enable ten students from both countries to visit the other. This was a move would enhance academic, sports and cultural harmony between students of both countries.

In October 2018, the Foundation rolled out the ''Learning to read, reading to learn'' project. This was to instill a culture of learning in children to enhance literacy. Some of the goals of the project were to build libraries across the country and introduce school and child friendly programs to enable children learn to read. In November 2018, the Foundation launched the 'Because I want to be' project. It provides a cushion for underprivileged girls in society and guarantees continuous education and skills training for female school dropouts.

The foundation built and commissioned a new Pediatric and Intensive Care Unit (PICU) at the Korle-Bu Teaching Hospital in 2019. In January 2019, she launched the Free to Shine campaign. This was to stop mother-to-child transmission of AIDS and was in line with the Organization of African First Ladies Against HIV and AIDS (OAFLA) drive.

In June 2019, the foundation presented six ambulances to some healthcare organizations to enhance the delivery of their services. The ''Save the Child, Save the Mother'' project established both a Mother and Baby Unit (MBU) and a Pediatric Intensive Care Unit (PICU) at the Komfo Anokye Teaching Hospital. It was sponsored by the foundation together with the Multimedia Group and The Komfo Anokye Teaching Hospital and supported by the Manhyia Palace and the Government of Japan. The project was geared towards reducing maternal and infant mortality. In September 2019, she made an appeal for the empowerment of women, at the United Nations General Assembly. This would make it possible for them to impact more on the welfare of their families and communities. It was at a side event put together by the Organization of African First Ladies for Development (OAFLAD) and themed “Renewing commitment towards enhancing gender equality and women’s empowerment in Africa”.

In January 2020, the foundation's women empowerment program, the Terema Women's Empowerment Initiative, in conjunction with the National Board for Small Scale Industries, trained women in soap making. In February 2020, the Rebecca Foundation, through the ‘Enhancing the Youth through Education and Health (EYEH) Soup Kitchen’ project, made a donation of assorted food items worth about GH¢15,000 to some street children in Accra. In March 2020, 120 women received money, ovens and deep freezers. Another group of 50 women received training in handiwork under the National Board for Small Scale Industries (NBSSI). They were given certificates and supported with equipment to startup. This was done to empower them in business and was undertaken to commemorate the International Women's Day that year. In April 2020, the foundation made a donation of assorted items through its 'Relief Boxes Challenge' to the SOS children's Village. This initiative was in partnership with the government to help groups manage through the partial lockdown better.

In 2020 she visited markets in Accra and was informed of the challenges traders faced with juggling their work and handling their children. This led to the construction of creches in some selected markets in Adentan and Dome in Accra, Apramdo in the Western Region and Koforidua in the Eastern Region. Each of them can accommodate 100 children and are equipped with washrooms, changing rooms and sleeping areas.

In February 2021, the Komfo Anokye Teaching Hospital, the Kumasi South Hospital and the Kwame Nkrumah University of Science and Technology Teaching Hospital each received 20 electronic beds from the foundation. These were to support their COVID-19 isolation centres.

In April 2021, the foundation commissioned a library which it had built at Dambai in the Oti Region of Ghana. The library is the Lapas Cluster of Schools.in the Krachi East Municipality. This was in line with one of the foundations plans to provide ultra modern libraries in some areas in the country.

In June 2021, the foundation formed a partnership with the Abdul Samad Rabiu Africa Initiative (ASR Africa). This involved the signing of :a Memorandum of Understanding which allots $500,000 from ASR Africa's annual $100 million Africa Fund for Social Development and Renewal to the Rebecca Foundation. The funds support the Foundation's drive to improve education.

In February 2023, the Foundation made a donation to the Ghana Health Service. This was in the form of three thermoregulators for early detection of cervical cancer to be used in Akim Oda, Gonja West and Ejiso.

== Personal life ==
Rebecca and Nana Addo Dankwa Akufo-Addo have been married since 1997 and in 2017 they celebrated their 20th Anniversary. They have five daughters and five grandchildren.

Rebecca Akufo-Addo was installed as the Development Queen mother of Ada Traditional Area at the 82nd anniversary celebration of Ada Asafotufiami festival in August 2019 and is known by the stool name Naana Ode Opeor Kabukie I.

Akufo-Addo is a Christian and a member of the Accra Ridge Church and the patron of the Infanta Malaria, a charity organization dedicated to the prevention of Malaria in children.

== Awards and honours ==
- Nutrition Champion by The African Leaders for Nutrition
- Excellence in Empowering Women and Children Award at the Africa Public Sector for fighting malaria
- H. E Rebecca was named among the Inaugural list of 100 most influential African Women in 2019.
- Outstanding contribution towards the Green Ghana Building project at the IFC/EDGE Ghana Green Building Awards.
- Woman of the Year at the 9th annual Ghana women of the Year Honours in September 2024
