= John Kufuor =

President of Ghana from 2001 to 2009

John Agyekum Kufuor GCB
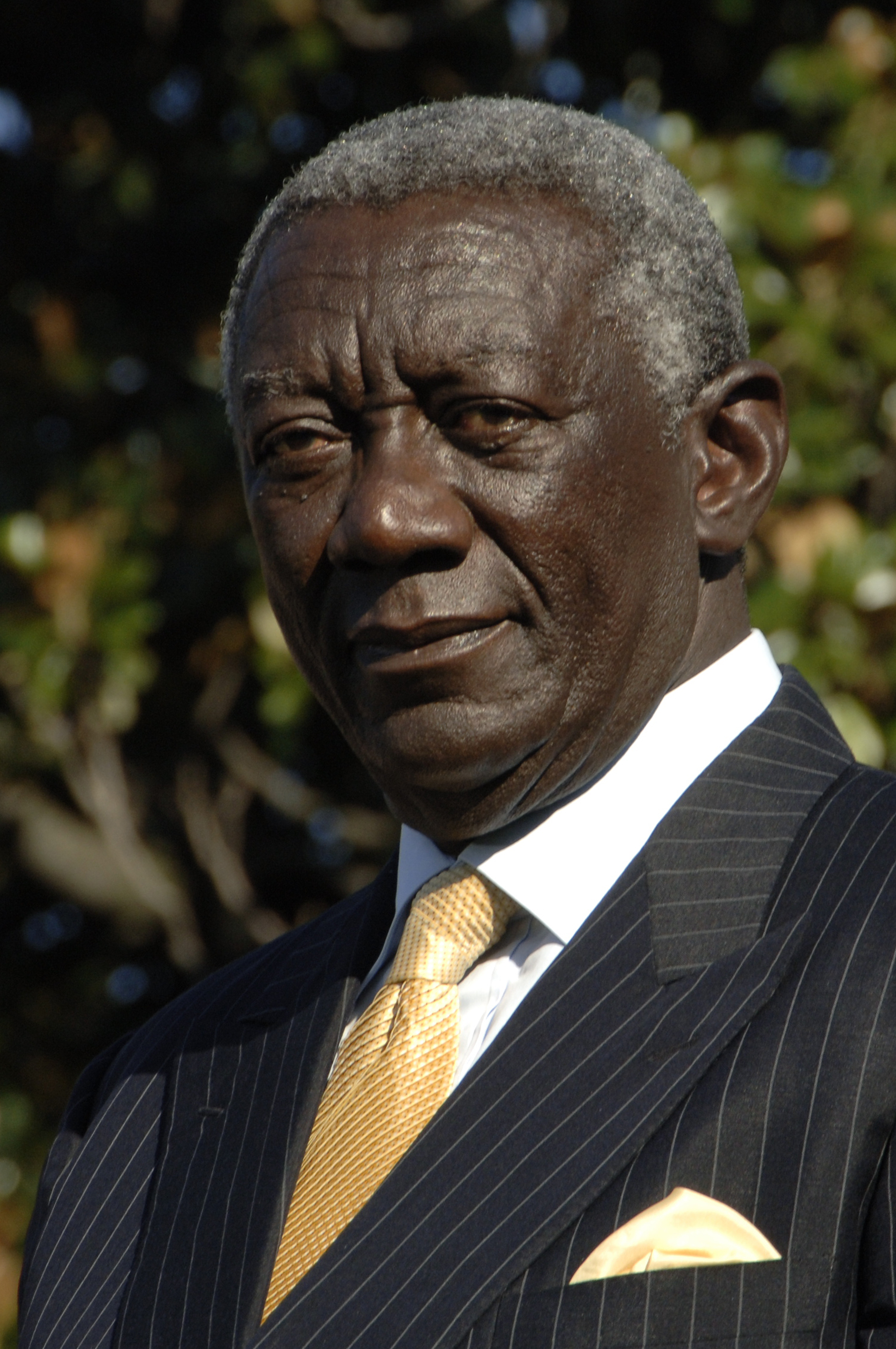
- Kufuor in 2008

10th President of Ghana
- In office 7 January 2001 – 7 January 2009
- Vice President: Aliu Mahama
- Preceded by: Jerry Rawlings
- Succeeded by: John Atta Mills

5th Chairperson of the African Union
- In office 30 January 2007 – 31 January 2008
- Preceded by: Denis Sassou Nguesso
- Succeeded by: Jakaya Kikwete

Member of Parliament for Atwima Nwabiagya
- In office 24 September 1979 – 31 December 1981
- In office 1 October 1969 – 13 January 1972

Personal details
- Born: John Kofi Agyekum Kufuor; 8 December 1938 (age 87) Kumasi, Colony of the Gold Coast
- Party: New Patriotic Party
- Spouse: Theresa Mensah (m. 1962; died 2023)
- Relations: Kwame Addo-Kufuor (brother); J. H. Mensah (brother-in-law)
- Children: 5, including John Addo
- Education: Prempeh College; Exeter College, Oxford; Lincoln's Inn
- Profession: Lawyer; Businessman; Politician

John Kofi Agyekum Kufuor (born 8 December 1938) is a Ghanaian politician who served as the tenth President of Ghana from 2001 to 2009. He was the fifth Chairperson of the African Union from 2007 to 2008 and his victory over John Atta Mills at the end of Jerry Rawlings' second term marked the first transition of power in Ghana from a democratic party to another democratic party.

Kufuor's career has been spent on the liberal-democratic side of Ghanaian politics, in the parties descended from the United Gold Coast Convention and the United Party. As a lawyer and businessman, he was a minister in Kofi Abrefa Busia's Progress Party government during Ghana's Second Republic, and a Popular Front Party opposition frontbencher during the Third Republic. In the Fourth Republic, Kufuor stood as the New Patriotic Party's candidate at the 1996 election, and then led it to victory in 2000 and 2004. Having served two terms in power, he retired from politics in 2008. He is popularly known as the Gentle Giant.

== Early life and schooling ==
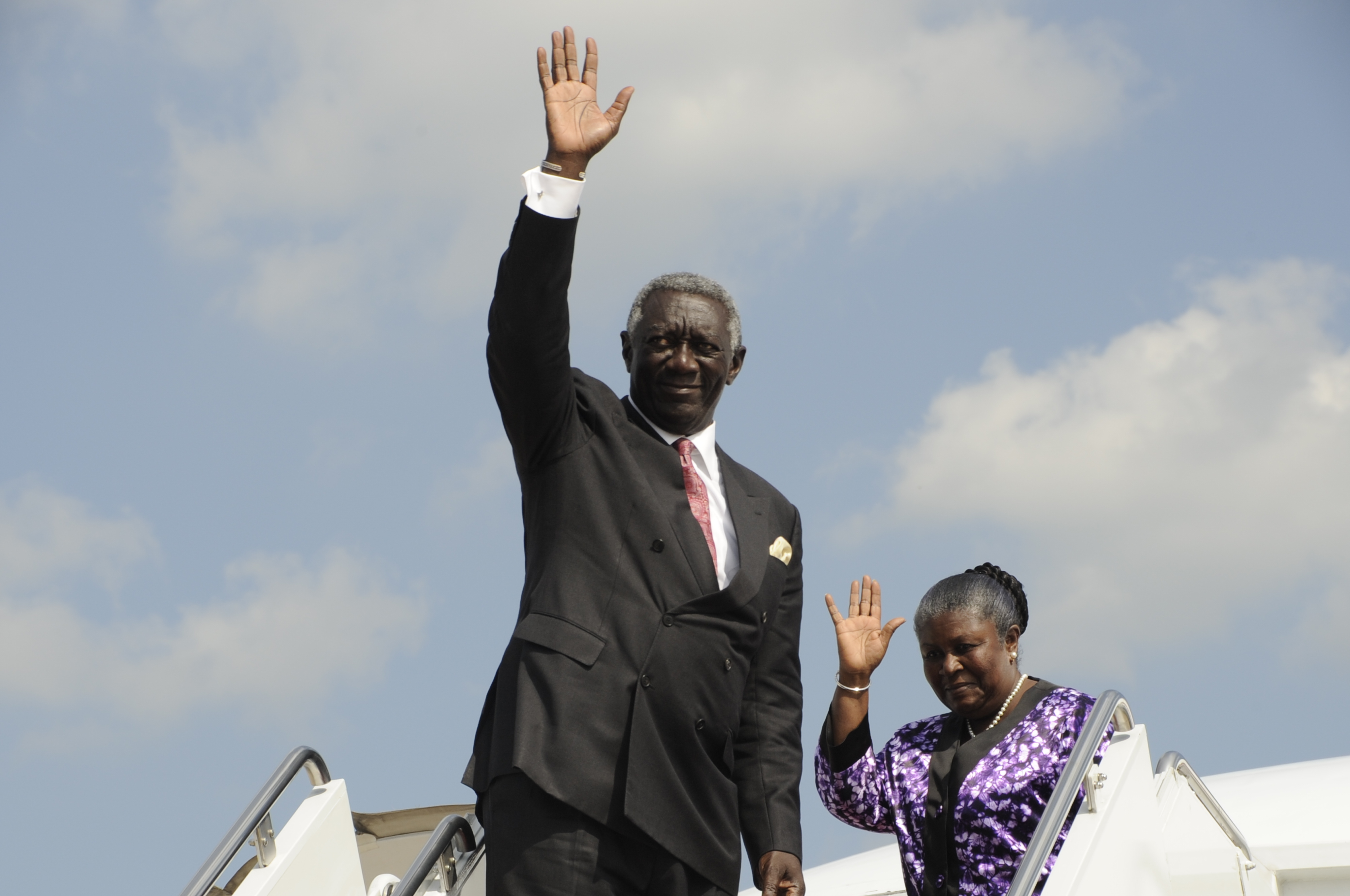
John and Theresa Kufuor (2008)

The scion of a royal maternal lineage, John Kufuor was born in Daaban, a suburb of Kumasi in the Ashanti Region of Ghana. He started his primary and elementary school at the Kumasi Government School located in Asem built by Sir Gordon Guggisberg. Kufuor was the 7th of 10 children of Nana Kwadwo Agyekum, an Asante and Nana Ama Dapaah, a Queen Mother. In 1951, he continued his primary (then called 'standard' three) education at Osei Tutu Boarding School (Osei Tutu Senior High School) from 1951 to 1953. At Prempeh College from 1954 to 1958, he schooled from Form 1 to Form 5. Arriving in London on 30 April 1959, he was by June accepted into Lincoln's Inn, London (1959–61) to study law, becoming qualified as a barrister in one year and eight months. He was called to the London bar in 1961. In the following year, he was called to the bar in Ghana. He obtained a BA Honours Degree in PPE (Philosophy, Politics and Economics) from Exeter College, University of Oxford from 1961-1964. He was initially employed at the Ghana Commercial Bank in London as a manager and legal officer. He returned to Ghana in the year 1965 at the behest of his mother who (having already bought a first-class ticket for his return) wished him to practice in Africa. He practiced in the Chambers of Victor Owusu with another lawyer, Owusu Yaw. In 1966, he became the town clerk of Kumasi City Council (now Kumasi Metropolitan Assembly). In the Second Republic's Parliamentary register, Kufuor listed his hobbies and interests as table tennis, reading, football, and film shows. He was once the chairman of Kumasi Asante Kotoko Football Club.

== Early political career ==
After completing his education, Kufuor returned to Ghana and launched his political career. In 1967, he became chief legal officer and town clerk for the city of Kumasi. By 1969, he was a member of Parliament and deputy foreign minister in the government of Kofi Abrefa Busia. Kufuor served as the Member of Parliament for Atwima Nwabiagya in the Second (1969–72) and Third (1979–81) Republics. He is a founding member of the Progress Party which was established in Busia's house. As Deputy Minister of Foreign Affairs, he represented Ghana on a number of occasions. From 1969 to December 1971, he led Ghana's delegation to the United Nations General Assembly in New York City, the Organization of African Unity (OAU) Ministerial Meetings in Addis Ababa, and the Summit Conference of the Non-Aligned Movement in Lusaka. In 1970 he led the Ghanaian delegation to Moscow in the Soviet Union, Prague (Czechoslovakia), and Belgrade (Yugoslavia) to discuss Ghana's indebtedness to these countries. As the Spokesman on Foreign Affairs and Deputy Opposition Leader of the Popular Front Party (PFP) Parliamentary Group during the Third Republic, he was invited to accompany President Hilla Limann to the OAU Summit Conference in Freetown, Sierra Leone. He was also a member of the parliamentary delegation that visited the United States in 1981 to talk to the International Monetary Fund (IMF) and the World Bank on Ghana's economic problems. In January 1982, the leadership of the All People's Party (APP), which was an alliance of all the opposition parties, advised some leading members, including the Deputy Leader of the Alliance, Alhaji Iddrisu Mahama, its general secretary, Dr Obed Asamoah and Kufuor, to accept an invitation from the Provisional National Defence Council (PNDC) to serve in what was purported to be a National Government. Kufuor was appointed the Secretary for Local Government in this new government. As Secretary for Local Government, he wrote the Local Government Policy Guidelines that were to be the foundation of the current decentralized District Assemblies.

== Elections ==
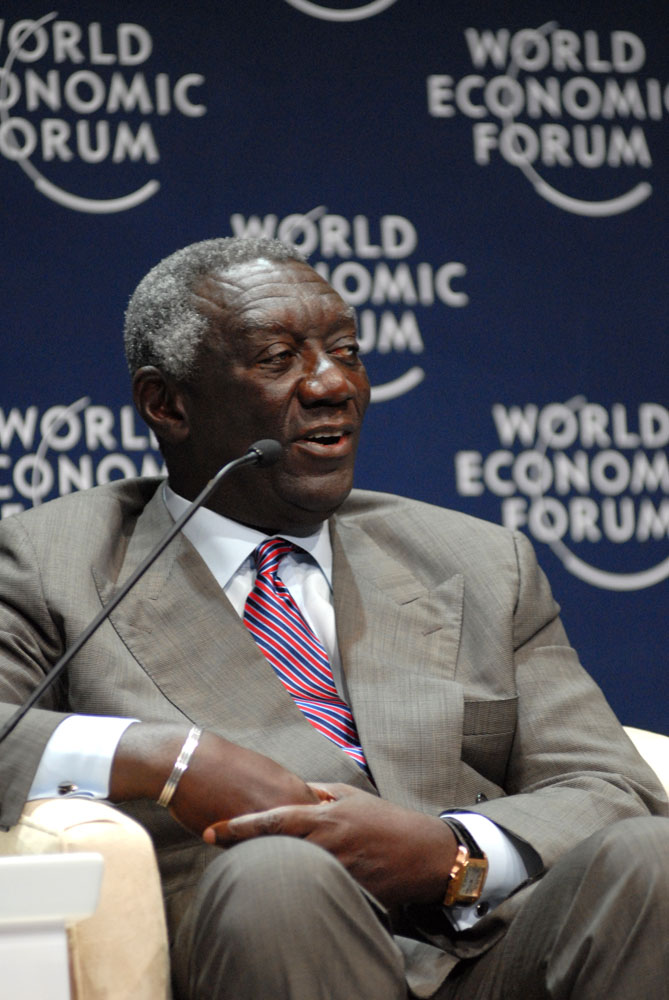
John Kufuor at the 2008 World Economic Forum on Africa

On 20 April 1996, Kufuor was nominated by 1034 out of 2000 delegates of the New Patriotic Party (NPP) drawn from all the 200 Constituencies of the Country to run for the president of Ghana on 10 December 1996. After campaigning for less than nine months, Kufuor polled 39.62% of the popular votes to Rawlings' 57% in the 1996 election. On 23 October 1998 he was re-nominated by the New Patriotic Party not only to run again for president but also to officially assume the position of Leader of the Party. Kufuor won the presidential election of December 2000; in the first round, held on 7 December, Kufuor came in first place with 48.4%, while John Atta-Mills, Jerry Rawlings' Vice-president, came in second with 44.8%, forcing the two into a run-off vote. In the second round, held on 28 December, Kufuor was victorious, taking 56.9% of the vote. When Kufuor was sworn in on 7 January 2001, it marked the first time in Ghana's history that an incumbent government had peaceful transition of power to the opposition. Kufuor was re-elected in presidential and parliamentary elections held on 7 December 2004, earning 52.45% of the popular vote in the first round and thus avoiding a run-off, while at the same time Kufuor's party, the New Patriotic Party, was able to secure more seats in the Parliament of Ghana.

== Presidency ==
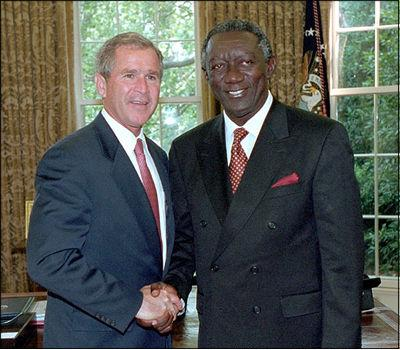
Kufuor with United States President George W. Bush during a visit to the US in 2001

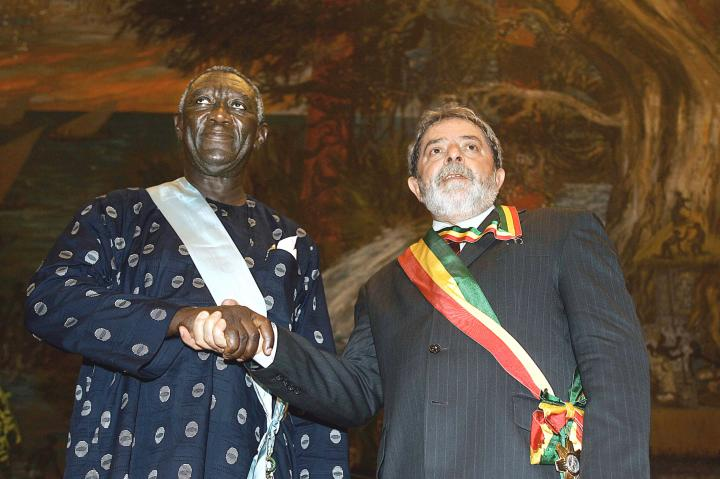
Kufuor with President of Brazil Luiz Inácio Lula da Silva in 2005

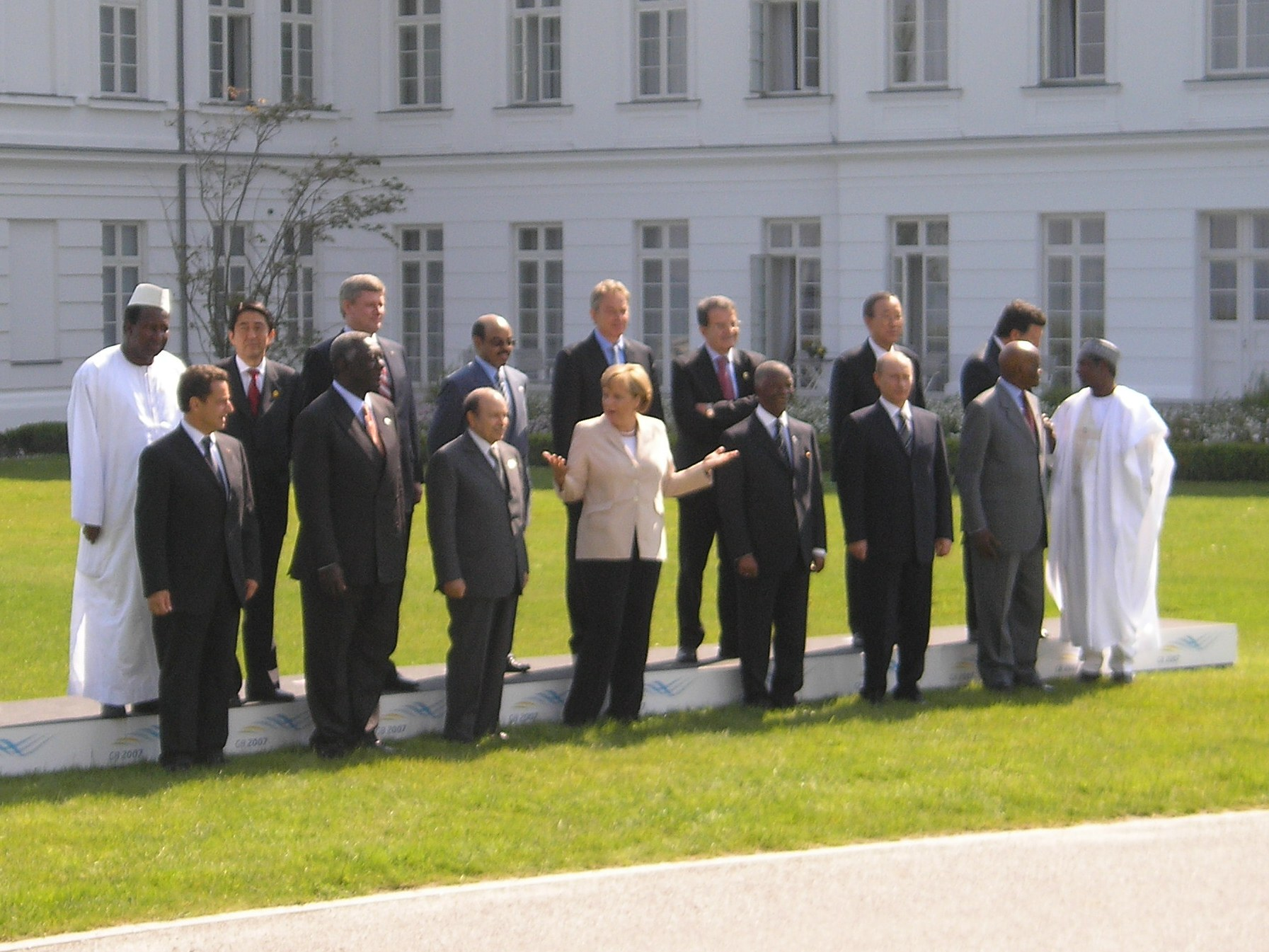
At the 33rd G8 summit in Heiligendamm in 2007 (Kufuor in front second from left)

His social vision was focused on unleashing the entrepreneurial, creative and innovative potential of Ghanaians as a means of creating wealth and hence dealing with the social challenges facing them. This socioeconomic vision was encapsulated in the Five Priority Areas Programme, viz., the pursuit of good governance, modernization of agriculture for rural development, private sector participation, enhanced social services and vigorous infrastructure development. His administration is said to have received the most financial assistance in the history of Ghana, due essentially to donors' distrust for the military governments before it, as well as those with some military connections. Kufuor's foreign policy was underpinned by what he termed "economic diplomacy". It is within this context that in Africa in general and in West Africa in particular, a good neighborliness policy has been pursued, which saw Ghana under Kufuor brokering peace in Liberia, Sierra Leone, Ivory Coast and Guinea-Bissau, among other African states. On the global stage, Kufuor actively sought the establishment of a just and equitable international social and economic order, while promoting and safeguarding the interests of Ghana through bilateral and multilateral agreements. His stature as statesman, democrat and credible spokesman for Africa found expression in his invitation to major international meetings and conferences including the founding summit of the AU, G8 Summits in Sea Island, Georgia and Gleneagles, Scotland, and the World Economic Forum. He served as chairman of the regional grouping ECOWAS for two consecutive terms – 2003 and 2004. In 2007, due to the policy successes his administration accumulated, Kufuor had his mandate renewed in 2004 and was sworn into office on 7 January 2005. Policy direction in Kufuor's second presidential term built on the foundations laid in the first four years. The administration pursued Ghana's socioeconomic transformation in the second term, using the three-pronged approach of private-sector development, human resource development and good governance. At the international level, Kufuor consolidated Ghana's position as the voice of Africa, credible peace broker, beacon of democracy (Ghana was the first country to undergo Peer Review under NEPAD's Africa Peer Review Mechanism) and responsible member of the committee of nations. On 29 January 2007, Kufuor was elected as Chairperson of the African Union for the 2007–08 AU session. He was succeeded by Jakaya Kikwete of Tanzania on 31 January 2008. Kufuor was involved in a car accident during his presidency on 14 November 2007, in which another car collided with his, causing it to roll over several times. Kufuor was reported to be uninjured.

=== Health ===
He started the National Health Insurance Scheme to replace the existent cash-and-carry system; 11 million Ghanaians were registered under this scheme. He set up the National Ambulance Service and built more than 205 hospitals and clinics. He also built a state-of-the-art emergency centre at the Komfo Anokye Teaching Hospital. Kufuor also introduced free maternal health care in public hospitals for all expectant mothers.

=== Education ===
Kufuor institutionalised the capitation grant for school children at the basic level, whereby each student was entitled to $2 for cultural sports and development. He also started the national school feeding programme. He changed the Senior Secondary School curriculum from three years to four years and renamed it Senior High School. He started the model school senior high school concept, in which some deprived schools were upgraded to the level of some first-class senior high schools.

=== Access to finance ===
Kufuor launched the Microfinance and small loans program (MASLOC) – a US $50million fund that makes micro loans available to the productive population – and introduced the Livelihood Empowerment Against Poverty Program (LEAP), which provides direct cash transfers to poor households in the country who could not support themselves. For the first time in Ghana's history, borrowing became so cheap and available that microfinance companies (and major banks) actually went on to the streets to encourage small-scale businessmen and women to apply for loans.

=== Sports ===
He renovated the Accra Sports Stadium and the Baba Yara Stadium as well as built the Essipong and Tamale stadiums in 2008 to host the CAN 2008. Under Kufuor Ghana qualified for the World Cup in 2006. President Kufuor's good governance policy led to Ghana obtaining a record $500 million grant from the U.S Millennium Challenge Account for economic development. The social vision behind the grant was anchored on unleashing the entrepreneurial, creative and innovative potential of Ghanaians as a means of creating wealth and hence dealing with the social challenges facing Ghanaians. This socio-economic vision was encapsulated in the Five Priority Areas Programme vis the pursuit of good governance, modernisation of agriculture for rural development, private sector participation, enhanced social services and vigorous infrastructural development. The George Walker Bush Highway was also built from this fund.

== Personal life ==
Kufuor, at the age of 23, married Theresa Kufuor (née Mensah) in 1962 after they met at a Republic Day Anniversary Dance in London in 1961; they have five children together. Kufuor and his family belong to the Roman Catholic Church. He is a Senior Grand Warden of the United Grand Lodge of England Freemasons, and has openly professed his membership as a Freemason since being a young lawyer. An Asante, Kufuor speaks the Twi language fluently. He was known for using his language whenever he was campaigning in his native Ashanti Region. Kufuor and his family reside in Accra, Ghana's capital. His wife, Theresa Kufuor, died on 1 October 2023. Kufuor has nine siblings - four brothers and five sisters.

== Post-presidency ==
In July 2009, Kufuor became a member of the SNV Netherlands Development Organization International Advisory Board to contribute his expertise to the organization's poverty reduction work. In September 2009, Kufuor spoke in the Netherlands at a Dutch government event to mark '60 years of development aid' at the invitation of Dutch Minister Bert Koenders, which was attended by nearly 2,000 people. During his visit to the Netherlands, he was interviewed by the newspaper NRC Handelsblad and the Internationale Samenwerking magazine. He argued for the importance of effective development assistance, pointing out that development aid helped Ghana enter the international capital market.

On 21 September 2009, he delivered the prestigious Legatum Pericles Lecture at the Legatum Center for Development and Entrepreneurship at the Massachusetts Institute of Technology. Kufuor is the governing council chairman of Interpeace, an international peace building organisation based in Geneva since October 2009. Also in 2009, he served on the High Level Commission on the Modernization of World Bank Group Governance, which – under the leadership of Ernesto Zedillo – conducted an external review of the World Bank Group's governance.

Kufuor was chosen together with Luiz Inácio Lula da Silva to jointly receive the 2011 World Food Prize for their personal commitment and visionary leadership while serving as the presidents of Ghana and of Brazil, respectively, in creating and implementing government policies to alleviate hunger and poverty in their countries. The foundation said the significant achievements of these two Laureates illustrate that transformational leadership truly can effect positive change and greatly improve people's lives.

On 20 September 2011, Kufuor inaugurated the John Agyekum Kufuor (JAK) Foundation with a ground-breaking ceremony for the JAK Centre for Leadership, Governance and Development at the University of Ghana, Legon. The inaugural lecture, which attracted very high local and foreign dignitaries, had Horst Köhler, former president of Germany, as its guest speaker. Thabo Mbeki, former president of South Africa, and Ghana ex-president Jerry John Rawlings, Kufuor's fiercest critic, were among the dignitaries who attended the ceremony. The ex-presidents also unveiled a plaque on 22 September 2011 for the Kufuor Presidential Library and Museum at Kwame Nkrumah University of Science and Technology (KNUST), Kumasi, which formed part of the John A. Kufuor Foundation. In September 2018 the foundation set up the Kufuor Young Entrepreneurs Network (K-YEN). This initiative supports and develops young entrepreneurs to excel in their endeavors. Since November 2011, Kufuor has been the first high-level chair of the Sanitation and Water for All (SWA) partnership.

Numerous NPP supporters tried to barricade President Kufuor's house on 7 January 2013 to prevent him from attending John Dramani Mahama's inauguration, which the NPP as a party had decided to boycott as they felt going would undermine their challenge to Mahama's win in court. Kufuor explained that the party had allowed him to go because he was invited as an ex-President of Ghana and not as a Member of the NPP to the chagrin of the supporters. The Ghana Police Service (GPS) reinforcement had to be sent to his abode to allow him to be able to go for the programme.

In September 2017, the George Grant University of Mines and Technology (UMaT) appointed Kufuor as the first chancellor of the university, the appointment taking effect from 1 November 2017. The Investiture was held in January 2018.

== 2024 General Elections ==
In a lead up to the 2024 Ghana Elections, former President John Kufuor publicly endorsed Dr. Mahamudu Bawumia's presidential campaign, highlighting his impressive skills in economic management as the reason for his endorsement. He received serious criticism from Alan Kyerematen, who expressed his endorsement of Dr. Bawumia as having tarnished the impartiality expected of a former statesman.

== Awards and accolades ==
Kufuor has received numerous awards, including the Face-of-Good-Governance Award, Chatham House Prize, the Climate Change Award, and the World Food Program's Global Ambassador Against Hunger.

- Chatham House Prize (2008)
- Distinction of Grand Cordon in the Most Venerable Order of the Knighthood of the Pioneers of the Republic of Liberia(2008)
- World Federation of Honorary Consuls' Order of the Gold Star (2008)
- Honorary Fellow, Exeter College, Oxford University, and Liverpool John Moores University, Liverpool, UK.
- Honorary Doctorate from the University of Cape Coast, Ghana
- Knight Commander of the Order of the Bath, conferred by Her Majesty Queen Elizabeth II of Great Britain
- Awarded highest award of the Order of the House of Orange, conferred by Her Majesty Queen Beatrix of the Netherlands
- Awarded State Honors from various countries including Italy, Germany and Brazil
- Leadership and Governance award, Ghana UK-Based Achievement Awards, Impact Africa Summit (2016)
- Senior Grand Warden of the United Grand Lodge of England, appointed by His Royal Highness Prince Edward, The Duke of Kent

=== Foreign Honours ===
- Brazil:
  - Grand Cross of the Order of the Southern Cross (2005)
- Germany:
  - Grand Cross Special Class of the Order of Merit of the Federal Republic of Germany (2008)
- Italy:
  - Knight Grand Cross with Collar of the Order of Merit of the Italian Republic (2006)
- Liberia:
  - Grand Cordon The Collar of State of the Order of the Pioneers of Liberia (2008) (2015)
- Netherlands:
  - Knight Grand Cross of the Order of the Netherlands Lion (2008)
- United Kingdom:
  - Knight Grand Cross of the Order of the Bath (2006)

== Bibliography ==
- Ivor Agyeman-Duah: Between Faith and History: A Biography of J. A. Kufuor (Trenton, NJ: Africa World Press, 2003, ISBN 1-59221-128-3). Oxfordshire: Ayebia Clarke Publishing, 2006. ISBN 978-0-9547023-9-7.

== See also ==
- List of heads of the executive by approval rating
- List of national leaders
- Kufuor government
- Tokyo International Conference on African Development (TICAD-IV), 2008.

Parliament of Ghana
Vacant Parliament suspended	Member of Parliament for Atwima Nwabagya; 1969–1972	Vacant Parliament suspended
Vacant Parliament suspended	Member of Parliament for Atwima Nwabagya; 1979–1981	Vacant Parliament suspended
Political offices
Preceded by N/A	Minister for Local Government; 1982	Succeeded by Acquah Harrison
Preceded by Jerry Rawlings	President of Ghana; 2001–2009	Succeeded by John Atta Mills
Preceded by Abdoulaye Wade	Chairman of the Economic Community of West African States; 2003–2005	Succeeded by Mamadou Tandja
Preceded by Denis Sassou Nguesso	Chairperson of the African Union; 2007–2008	Succeeded by Jakaya Kikwete
Party political offices
Preceded by Albert Adu Boahen	New Patriotic Party presidential candidate 1996, 2000, 2004	Succeeded by Nana Addo Dankwa Akufo-Addo
