= Ahmed Ramadan (politician) =

Ghanaian politician

Hon. Ahmed Ramadan

Ambassador to Kingdom of the United Arab Emirates (UAE)
- Incumbent
- Assumed office 2017

Personal details
- Born: Ahmed Ramadan
- Party: People's National Convention
- Children: 1. Abu Ramadan; 2. Mohammed Adamu Ramadan; 3. Samira Bawumia
- Occupation: Politician

Alhaji Ahmed Ramadan is Ghanaian politician and former chairman of People's National Convention (PNC). He retired from active politics in 2015.

== Politics ==
He is a former chairman of the People's National Convention(PNC). In 2017 he was appointed by President Akufo-Addo as Ghana's first Ambassador to the United Arab Emirates.

== Personal life ==
Alhaji Ramadan is father of three Ghanaian notable personalities; Abu Ramadan (Youth Organizer of PNC), Mohammed Adamu Ramadan (NDC parliamentary aspirant for Adentan) and Samira Bawumia.
