= Tamale Girls' Senior High School =

Location
- Tamale, Ghana; Northern Region; Tamale, Ghana, Northern Region; Ghana; 9°24′53″N 0°50′59″W

Information
- School type: Public senior high school Single sex
- Founded: 1998; 28 years ago
- School district: Tamale
- Oversight: Ghana Ministry of Education
- Head of school: Hajia Mariama Mohammed
- Grades: Forms (1-3)
- Gender: Girls
- Classes offered: Home Economics, Science, General Arts, Visual Arts

Tamale Girls' Senior High School is a public senior high school for girls located in Tamale in the Northern Region of Ghana.

== History ==
Tamale Girls Senior High School was founded in the 1998/99 academic year as Northern Region's first girls senior high school. The school was founded on the idea of RAINS/CAMFED, an international NGO, in partnership with the Regional Co-ordinating Council (RCC) and the Ghana Education Service to meet the region's critical requirements for female institutions.

The school began with a student body of 62 females and 12 teachers. General Arts, General Science, Business, and Home Economics are the study programs. With the school's growth, the enrolment now stands at 1,328 students, with 73 teachers and 59 non-teaching staff members.

Mr. Issah Issahaku was the school's first acting Head of School in 1999. An interim management board backed him up.

Miss Mercy Amanquandoh was appointed as the school's first formal headmistress in the year 2000. Hajia Mariatu Mohammed, the second headmistress, handed up the leadership of the school in January 2010 after she retired. She, too, retired in May 2014, and the school's management was taken over by Hajia Amina M. Musah, the school's third Headmistress. In October 2016, Hajia Nafisa Abukari, the 4th Headmistress, was transferred from Sawla SHS to Tamale Girls SHS as the new headmistress. Currently the institution is a category B school

== Programs Offered ==
- General Science
- General Arts
- Business
- Home Economics
- Language

== School Code ==
0080109

== Mission ==
- To create a conducive teaching and learning environment
- To engage and maintain quality and dedicated staff
- To impart the requisite knowledge, skills and attitude for further training to fit into the world of work and living through stakeholder engagement.

== Vision ==
An Institution of excellence to provide holistic education to the enrolled Girl-Child for further training to become productive citizens.

== Core Values ==
=== Success ===
Success is achieving goals through hard work, perseverance, and overcoming challenges, while finding fulfillment and personal growth along the way.

=== Respect ===
Respect is recognizing and valuing others' worth, treating them with kindness, fairness, and understanding, regardless of differences or opinions.

=== Discipline ===
Discipline is self-control, adherence to rules, and consistent effort towards goals, fostering responsibility, focus, and personal growth.

=== Excellence ===
Excellence is the pursuit of the highest quality, continuous improvement, and achieving exceptional standards through dedication, skills, and persistence.

=== Good Morals ===
Good morals are ethical principles that guide behavior, emphasizing honesty, respect, kindness, responsibility, fairness, and integrity in action.

=== Team Work ===
The School believe in collaborative effort where individuals work together, combining skills and strengths to achieve common goals efficiently and effectively.

=== Loyalty ===
The School believe in a strong sense of faithfulness, commitment, and devotion to a person, cause, organization, or belief.
