= Emmanuel Nii Ashie Moore =

Ghanaian politician

Hon. Emmanuel Nii Ashie Moore

Member of Parliament for Adenta Constituency
- In office 7 January 2013 – 6 January 2017

Greater Accra Regional Chairman

Personal details
- Born: Emmanuel Nii Ashie Moore; 26 December 1969 (age 56) Teshie, Ghana
- Party: National Democratic Congress
- Education: European University of Hasselt, Belgium
- Occupation: Politician

Emmanuel Nii Ashie Moore (born 26 December 1969) is a Ghanaian politician and member of the Sixth Parliament of the Fourth Republic of Ghana representing the Adenta Constituency in the Greater Accra Region and the current Regional Chairman of the Greater Accra Region on the ticket of the National Democratic Congress.

== Personal life ==
Moore is a Christian (Assemblies of God Church). He is married.

== Early life and education ==
Moore was born on 26 December 1969. He hails from Teshie-Accra, a town in the Greater Accra Region of Ghana. He entered the European University of Hasselt, Belgium, and obtained his Bachelor of Science degree's Business Administration – Marketing in 2003.

== Politics ==
Moore is a member of the National Democratic Congress (NDC) and also the current Greater Accra regional chairman for the National Democratic Congress. In 2012, he contested for the Adenta seat on the ticket of the NDC sixth parliament of the fourth republic and won.

After winning the Greater Accra Regional Chairmanship elections, he issued a cheque of GH¢150,000.00 to selected constituencies in the region as a fulfillment of his campaign promise to resource and rebrand the region to capture power in 2024.

After the National Delegates Conference of the NDC, Mr. Moore congratulated Accra delegates for voting massively for John Dramani Mahama as the next flagbearer and Presidential candidate of the NDC for the 2024 General Elections. Prior to the NDC Primaries on Saturday, 13 May 2023, John Dramani Mahama promised a flat fee of GH¢40.00 to every delegate to incentivize them to vote. However, the Regional Secretary of the NDC in the Greater Accra Region has accused Mr. Moore of withholding funds meant for delegates as promised by one of the contenders for the NDC flagbearership race.

=== Assassination attempts ===
On Monday, 27 February 2023, Mr. Moore's office at Teshie was ransacked and some items were stolen. He indicated that this was the third time he is experiencing such an incident. The Ghana Police Service has come under severe criticism from Mr. Moore for not taking threats to his life seriously after making multiple complaints.

== Employment ==
- Deputy Executive Director, National Service Scheme
- Manager/administrator/HR practitioner
