= Gushegu (Ghana parliament constituency) =

Ghana parliament constituency

Gushiegu
- constituency for the Parliament of Ghana
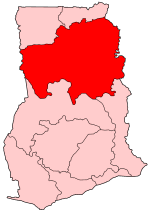
- District: Gushegu District
- Region: Northern Region of Ghana

Current constituency
- Party: New Patriotic Party
- MP: Alhassan S. Tampuli

Gushiegu is one of the constituencies represented in the Parliament of Ghana. The constituency elects one Member of Parliament (MP) by the first-past-the-post system of election. Alhassan S. Tampuli is the member of parliament for the constituency Gushiegu is located in the Northern Region of Ghana.

== Members of Parliament ==
First elected	Member	Party
Gushegu
1965	Sulemana Ibun Iddrissu	Convention People's Party
1969	Seth Adam Ziblim	National Alliance of Liberals
1979	Abdulai Al-Hassan	Popular Front Party
Third Republic (Gushegu - Karaga)
1979	Issahaku Mahama	National Democratic Congress
Fourth Republic (Gushegu - Karaga)
1992	Issahaku Mahama	National Democratic Congress
1996	Iddrisu Huudu	National Democratic Congress
Gushegu
2004	Rita Tani Iddi	New Patriotic Party
2008	Thomas Kwesi Nasah	National Democratic Congress
2016	Ziblim Iddi	New Patriotic Party
2020	Alhassan Tampuli Sulemana	New Patriotic Party

== Elections ==
The table below shows the parliamentary election results for Gushegu constituency during the 2000 Ghanaian general election.

2000 Ghanaian parliamentary election: Gushegu Source:Ghana Home Page
Party	Candidate	Votes	%	±%
National Democratic Congress	Iddrisu Huudu	18,524	50.90	—
New Patriotic Party	Rita Tani Iddi	12,686	34.80	—
Convention People's Party	Alhassan Musah Yahaya	3, 181	8.70	—
People's National Convention	Moli Majeed	1,537	4.20	—
NRP	Hamidu S. Imoru	279	0.80	—
UGM	Tahidu Mahamudu	220	0.60	—
Majority		18,524	50.90	—

The following table shows the parliamentary election results for Gushegu constituency in the 2004 Ghanaian general election.

2004 Ghanaian parliamentary election: Gushegu Source:Ghana Home Page
Party	Candidate	Votes	%	±%
New Patriotic Party National Democratic Congress	Rita Tani Iddi	14,643	52.80	—
National Democratic Congress	Iddrisu Hudu	13,108	47.20	—
Majority		14,648	52.80	—

The below table shows the parliamentary election results for Gushegu constituency during the 2008 Ghanaian general election.

2008 Ghanaian parliamentary election: Gushegu Source:Ghana Home Page
Party	Candidate	Votes	%	±%
National Democratic Congress	Thomas Kwesi Nasah	14,732	50.32	—
New Patriotic Party	Rita Tani Iddi	14,035	47.94	—
People's National Convention	Dang- yi	194	0.66	—
DFP	Abukari Amadu	135	0.46	—
Convention People's Party	Abdulai Alhassan	131	0.45	—
Democratic People's Party	Iddrisu A. Rashid	51	0.17	—
Majority		14,732	50.32	—

The following table shows the parliamentary election results for Gushegu constituency in the 2012 Ghanaian general election.

2012 Ghanaian general election: Gushegu Source:Ghana Home Page
Party	Candidate	Votes	%	±%
National Democratic Congress	Thomas Kwesi Nasah	18,776	49.94	—
New Patriotic Party	Rita Tani Iddi	18,439	49.05	—
UFP	Manyiman Iddrisu	259	0.69	—
Progressive People's Party	Mahama Baba	122	0.32	—
Majority		18,776	49.94	—

2016 Ghanaian general election: Gushegu
Party	Candidate	Votes	%	±%
New Patriotic Party	Ziblim Iddi	22,529	54.22	—
National Democratic Congress	Thomas Kwesi Nasah	18,479	44.47	—
Progressive People's Party	Alhassan Abass	316	0.76	—
Convention People's Party	Issah Baba	228	0.55	—
Majority		4,050	9.75	—
Turnout		—	—	—
Registered electors		—		—

2020 Ghanaian general election: Gushegu
Party	Candidate	Votes	%	±%
New Patriotic Party	Alhassan Tampuli Sulemana	30,401	52.01	−2.21
National Democratic Congress	Mohammed Yussif Malimali	28,055	47.99	+3.52
Majority		2,346	4.02	−5.73
Turnout		—	—	—
Registered electors		—		—

== See also ==
- List of Ghana Parliament constituencies
