= Alhassan Tampuli Sulemana =

Ghanaian politician

Hon. Alhaji Alhassan Tampuli Sulemana
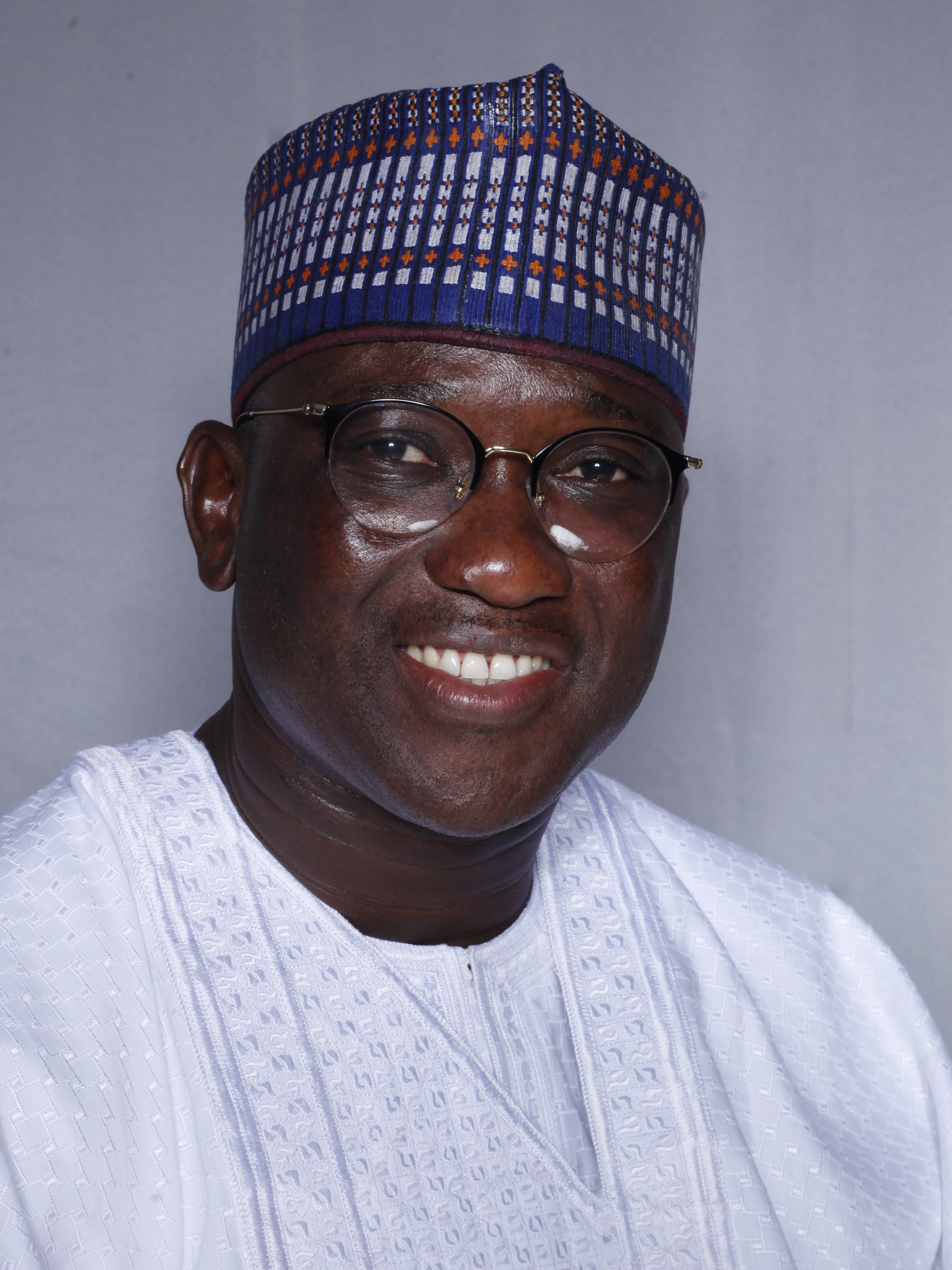

Member of Parliament for Gushegu Constituency, Deputy Minister for Transports
- Incumbent
- Assumed office 7 January 2021

Personal details
- Born: Alhassan Tampuli Sulemana; 27 May 1976 (age 50) Zinindo, Ghana
- Party: New Patriotic Party
- Occupation: Politician
- Committees: Standing Orders Committee; Communications Committee; Appointments Committee; Business Committee

Alhassan Sulemana Tampuli sometimes Hassan Tampuli, is a Ghanaian politician, lawyer, energy expert and member of the Eighth Parliament of the Fourth Republic of Ghana representing the Gushegu Constituency in the Northern Region on the ticket of the New Patriotic Party. He is a former Deputy Minister for Transport.

In 2018, he was the head of the National Petroleum Authority (NPA).

== Early life and education ==
Sulemana was born on 27 May 1976 in Gushegu in the Northern Region of Ghana, and hails from Zinindo in the Northern region of Ghana. He completed his O Level in 1994 graduating from the University of Ghana with a bachelor's degree in business administration. Upon graduation, he was employed as an administrator at the National Service Scheme. He rose to become the Deputy Head of Human Resource and later acted as the Director of Postings. He further had his DPA in Public Administration in 2002. He later obtained his bachelor's degree in Public Administration in 2005.

Tampuli took leave from the service to pursue a law degree from the Faculty of Law at the University of Ghana. He again had his LLB in General Law in 2009. After his two years of faculty education, he was admitted to the Ghana School of Law. He was called to the Ghana Bar in 2011. He traveled to the United States to further his legal education in 2013. Tampuli graduated from the Moritz College of Law at Ohio State University with a Master of Laws degree in energy and environmental law.

== Career ==
=== Legal career ===
After earning his master's degree, he returned to the National Service Scheme and established the Legal Department in April 2014. He headed the department until 2015, when he resigned from the service to co-found the corporate law firm, East-bridge Associates. While at the National Service Scheme, he was a visiting lecturer on constitutional law at the Faculty of Law of the Wisconsin International University College from 2014 to 2015. He resigned from the university in order to engage fully with his private law practice. Hassan worked with the Energy and Natural Resource Practice Group of the law firm Bentsi – Enchill, Letsa & Ankomah as an associate lawyer.

Among Tampuli's legal cases is his advocacy for the release of Lebanese-Ghanaian pilot, journalist, and author Samih Daboussi, who had been detained by the Bureau of National Investigations (BNI) in September 2016 for a period beyond what the Ghanaian constitution allowed. Daboussi had published a book titled 59 years of Ghana to Nowhere: The Future is Now, in which he detailed some activities of functionaries of the National Democratic Congress (NDC) as well as then-president John Dramani Mahama. Some sympathizers of the NDC felt that comments about members of the NDC in the book were offensive and lodged a complaint at the BNI. Daboussi was arrested at Accra International Airport upon returning from a trip to Lebanon. His house was searched without warrant by the BNI and copies of his books were seized. The BNI reported that Samih was arrested because his conduct and activities were considered offensive to the president. Tampuli reported that he had been denied access to his client. A social media campaign ensued on Twitter and Facebook using the hashtag #FreeFadiNow seeking the release of Daboussi. Daboussi was released after his bail application was granted.

=== National Petrolium Authority ===
From 2017 to 2021, Tampuli was Chief Executive Officer of the National Petroleum Authority.

== Politics ==
Tampuli is a member of the NPP and currently the MP for the Gusheigu Constituency in the Northern region. Prior to the 2016 Ghanaian general election, he was a member of the party's manifesto Subcommittee on Energy, and the Transition Subcommittee on Energy. In January 2017, he was appointed as the acting and later substantive head of the National Petroleum Authority. He succeeded Moses Asaga who had been the head of the authority since 2013.

In the 2020 Ghanaian elections, he won the parliamentary seat with 30,401 votes whilst the NDC parliamentary aspirant Mohammed Yussif Malimali had 28,055 votes and the NDP parliamentary candidate Abdulai Abdul-Razak had 250 votes.

=== Committees ===
Tampuli is a member of the Standing Orders Committee, also a member of the Business Committee and also a member of the Appointments Committee.

== Personal life ==
Suleman is a Muslim.

== Philanthropy ==
In February 2021, Sulemana pledged to build a palace in the Kpatinga Traditional area.

== Controversy ==
In January 2025, Sulemana was suspended by Alban Bagbin for 2 weeks after he was involved in chaos during the sitting of the Appointments Committee.

Political offices
Preceded by Moses Asaga	National Petroleum Authority of Ghana; January 2017 –	Incumbent
