= Gushegu-Karaga District =

- Former District
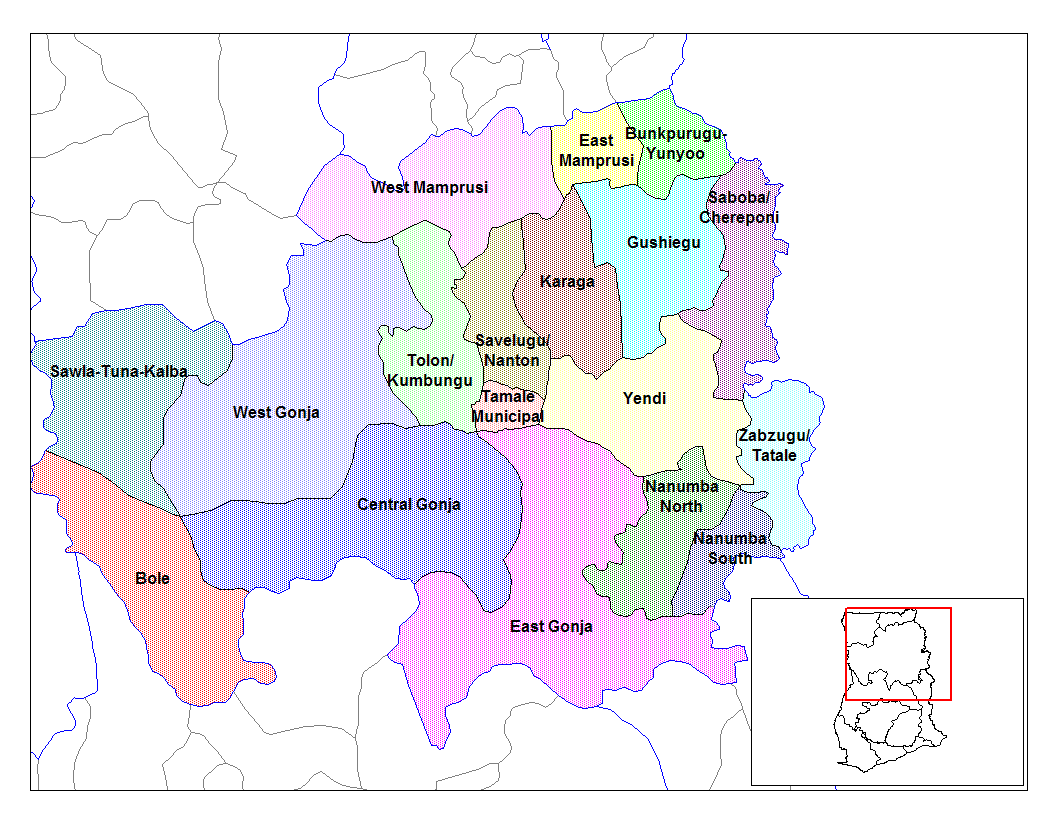
- Districts of Northern Region

- Location of Gushegu-Karaga District within Northern
- Coordinates: 9°55′9″N 0°13′5″W
- Country: Ghana
- Region: Northern
- Capital: Gushegu
- Time zone: UTC+0 (GMT)
- ISO 3166 code: GH-NP-GK

Gushegu-Karaga District is a former district that was located in Northern Region, Ghana. Originally created as an ordinary district assembly in 1988, which was created from the former East Dagomba District Council. However on 28 June 2012, it was split off into two new districts: Gushegu District (capital: Gushegu) and Karaga District (capital: Karaga). The district assembly was located in the northeast part of Northern Region and had Gushegu as its capital town.

== See also ==
- "Districts of Ghana". Statoids.
- GhanaDistricts.com
