= Iddi =

Iddi is a surname. It may refer to:

- Abdul-Yakuni Iddi (born 1986), Ghanaian footballer
- Baba Iddi (born 1982), Ghanaian footballer
- Gilbert Seidu Iddi, Ghanaian academic and politician
- Rita Tani Iddi, Ghanaian politician
- Saani Iddi (1956–2012), Ghanaian politician and entrepreneur
- Seif Ali Iddi (born 1942), Tanzanian politician
- Ziblim Iddi, Ghanaian politician
