= Zabzugu-Tatale District =

- Former District
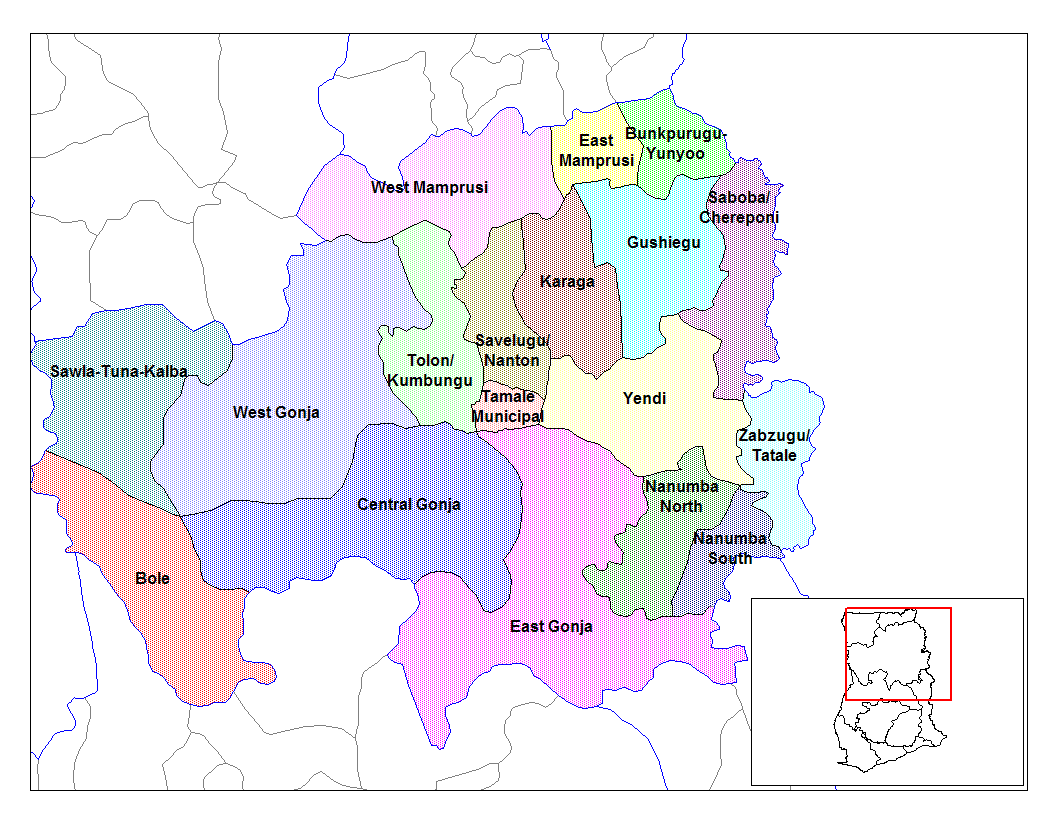
- Districts of Northern Region

- Location of Zabzugu-Tatale District within Northern
- Coordinates: 9°17′49.2″N 0°22′8.4″E
- Country: Ghana
- Region: Northern
- Capital: Zabzugu

Government
  - District Executive: Alhaji Yakubu Bukari

Area
  - Total: 2,365 km^{2} (913 sq mi)

Population (2010)
  - Total: 123,854
- Time zone: UTC+0 (GMT)
- ISO 3166 code: GH-NP-ZT

Zabzugu-Tatale District is a former district that was located in Northern Region, Ghana. Originally created as an ordinary district assembly in 1988, which was created from the former East Dagomba District Council. However on 28 June 2012, it was split off into two new districts: Zabzugu District (capital: Zabzugu) and Tatale-Sangule District (capital: Tatale). The district assembly was located in the eastern part of Northern Region and had Zabzugu as its capital town.

== Demographics ==
As of the 2010 census, Zabzugu-Tatale District had 123,854 inhabitants. Of those, 57,249 inhabitants were aged up to 14 years old, 61,930 inhabitants were aged between 15 and 64 years old, while 4,675 inhabitants were aged 65 years or older.
