= Zabzugu Senior High School =

High school in Zabzugu, Ghana

Coordinates: 9.299°N 0.375°E

- Zabzugu, Northern Region; Ghana

Information
- Type: High school
- Established: 1991 (35 years ago)
- Grades: 1–3
- Nickname: Zabsec

Zabzugu Senior High School is a community day and boarding school located in Tuvugu in the Zabzugu district in the Northern region of Ghana.

== History ==
The school was established on 28 January 1991 and had 83 students. The first headmaster of the school was Mr. Abdulai Mohammed. In 2020, Zabzugu SHS won the first contest for the Northern zone in the National Science and Maths Quiz against Anbariya Senior High School and Gowrie Senior High Technical School. The various houses for the students in the school are four namely, Yelizoli house, Nkrumah house, Sonaa house and Oti house.

== The vision of the school ==
The school was established to attract, train and produce scholars from the various ethnic groups in the community who impact positively on national productivity and national development agenda.

== Programs offered ==
There are five educational programmes offered in the school by the students, these include;

1. General Arts
2. General Science
3. General Agric
4. Home Economics
5. Business
