= Iddrisu Huudu =

Ghanaian politician

Hon. Iddrisu Huudu

Member of Parliament for Gushiegu/Karaga Constituency
- In office 7 January 1997 – 6 January 2001
- President: Jerry John Rawlings

Member of Parliament for Gushiegu/Karaga Constituency
- In office 7 January 2001 – 6 January 2005
- President: John Kufuor

Personal details
- Party: National Democratic Congress
- Profession: Politician

Iddrisu Huudu is a Ghanaian politician and was the Member of Parliament for the Gushiegu/Karaga constituency in the Northern region of Ghana. He was a Member of Parliament in the 3rd parliament of the 4th republic of Ghana.

== Politics ==
Huudu is a member of the National Democratic Congress. He was elected as the Member of Parliament for the Gushiegu/Karaga constituency in the Northern region in the 3rd parliament of the 4th republic of Ghana. He was succeeded by Rita Tani Iddi in the 2004 Ghanaian General elections.

Huudu was elected as the Member of Parliament for the Gushiegu/Karaga constituency in the 2000 Ghanaian general elections. He was elected on the ticket of the National Democratic Congress. His constituency was a part of the 18 parliamentary seats out of 23 seats won by the National Democratic Congress in that election for the Northern Region. The National Democratic Congress won a minority total of 92 parliamentary seats out of 200 seats in the 3rd parliament of the 4th republic of Ghana. He was elected with 18,524 votes out of 37,264 total valid votes cast. This was equivalent to 50.9% of the total valid votes cast. He was elected over Rita Tani Iddi of the New Patriotic Party, Alhasan M. Yahaya of the Convention People's Party, Moli Majeed of the People's National Convention, Hamidu S. Imoru of the National Reform Party and Tahidu Mahamudu of the United Ghana Movement. These obtained 12,686, 3,181, 1,537, 279 and 220 votes respectively out of the total valid votes cast. These were equivalent to 34.8%, 8.7%, 4.2%, 0.8 and 0.6% respectively of the total valid votes cast.

Huudu initially represented his constituency at the 1996 Ghanaian General Elections and was elected into parliament on 7th January, 1997.
