= Mion District =

District in Northern Region, Ghana

- District
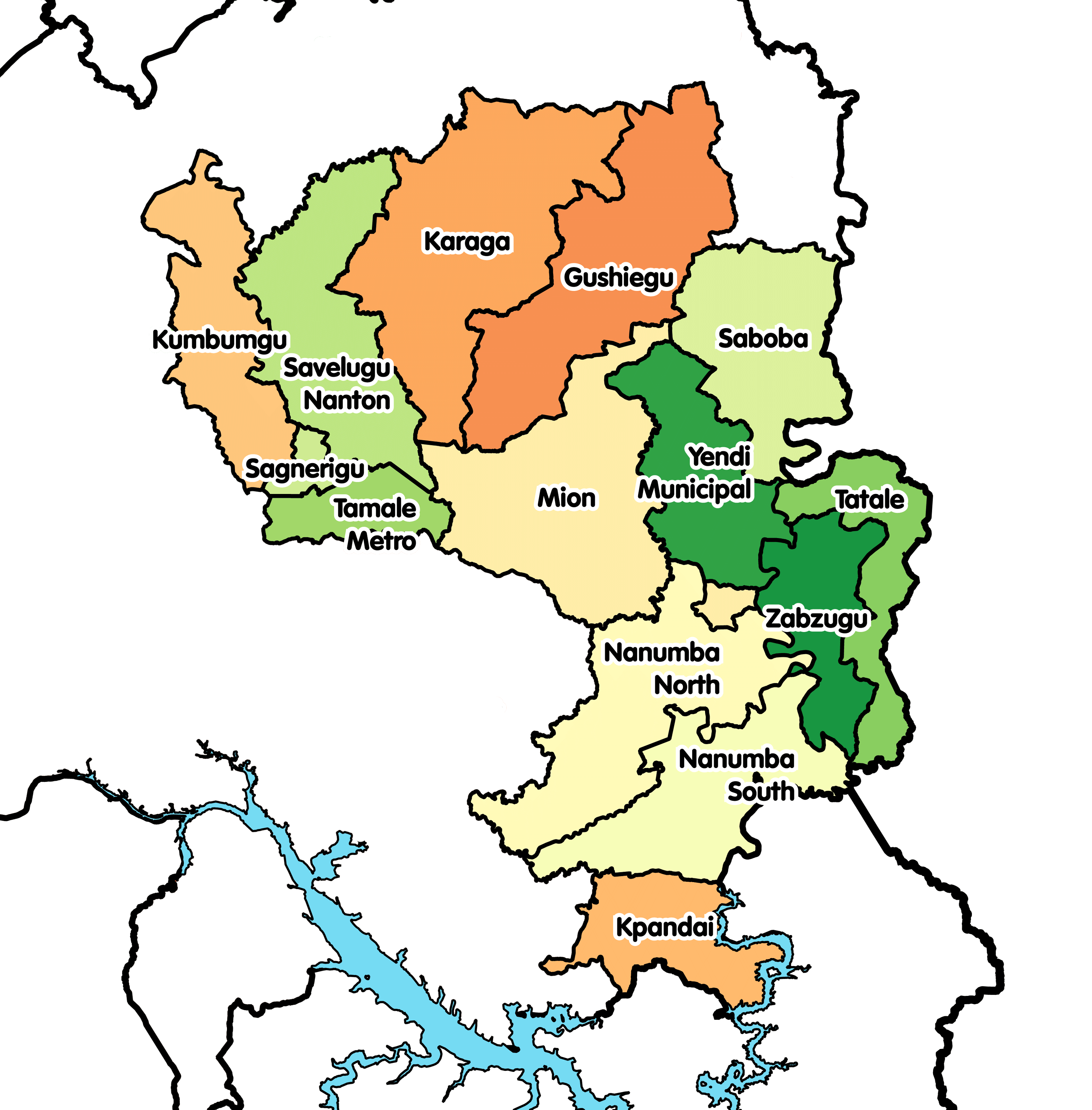
- Districts of Northern Region

- Location of Mion District within Northern
- Coordinates: 9°25′1.92″N 0°16′33.96″W
- Country: Ghana
- Region: Northern
- Capital: Sang

Government
  - District Executive: Mohammed Hashim Abdullah

Area
  - Total: 2,714.1 km^{2} (1,047.9 sq mi)

Population (2021)
  - Total: 94,930
- Time zone: UTC+0 (GMT)
- ISO 3166 code: GH-NP-MI

Mion District is one of the sixteen districts in Northern Region, Ghana. Originally it was formerly part of the then-larger Yendi District in 1988, which was created from the former East Dagomba District Council, until the western part of the district was later split off to create Mion District on 28 June 2012; thus the remaining original part has bee retained to become Yendi Municipal District (which it was elevated to municipal district assembly status on 29 February 2008). The district assembly is located in the central part of Northern Region and has Sang as its capital town.

== Location ==
Its northern neighbours are the Gushegu Municipal and Karaga Districts. To the east is the Yendi Municipal District. The districts bordering Mion District on the west are Tamale Metropolis, Savelugu Municipal and Nanton District. On the south, it borders Nanumba North District and East Gonja Municipal.

== Population ==
According to the 2010 Ghana housing census, the total population is 91,812. This is made up of 42,649 males and 44,163 females.
