= Karaga Municipal District =

District in Northern Region, Ghana

Karaga Municipal
- District
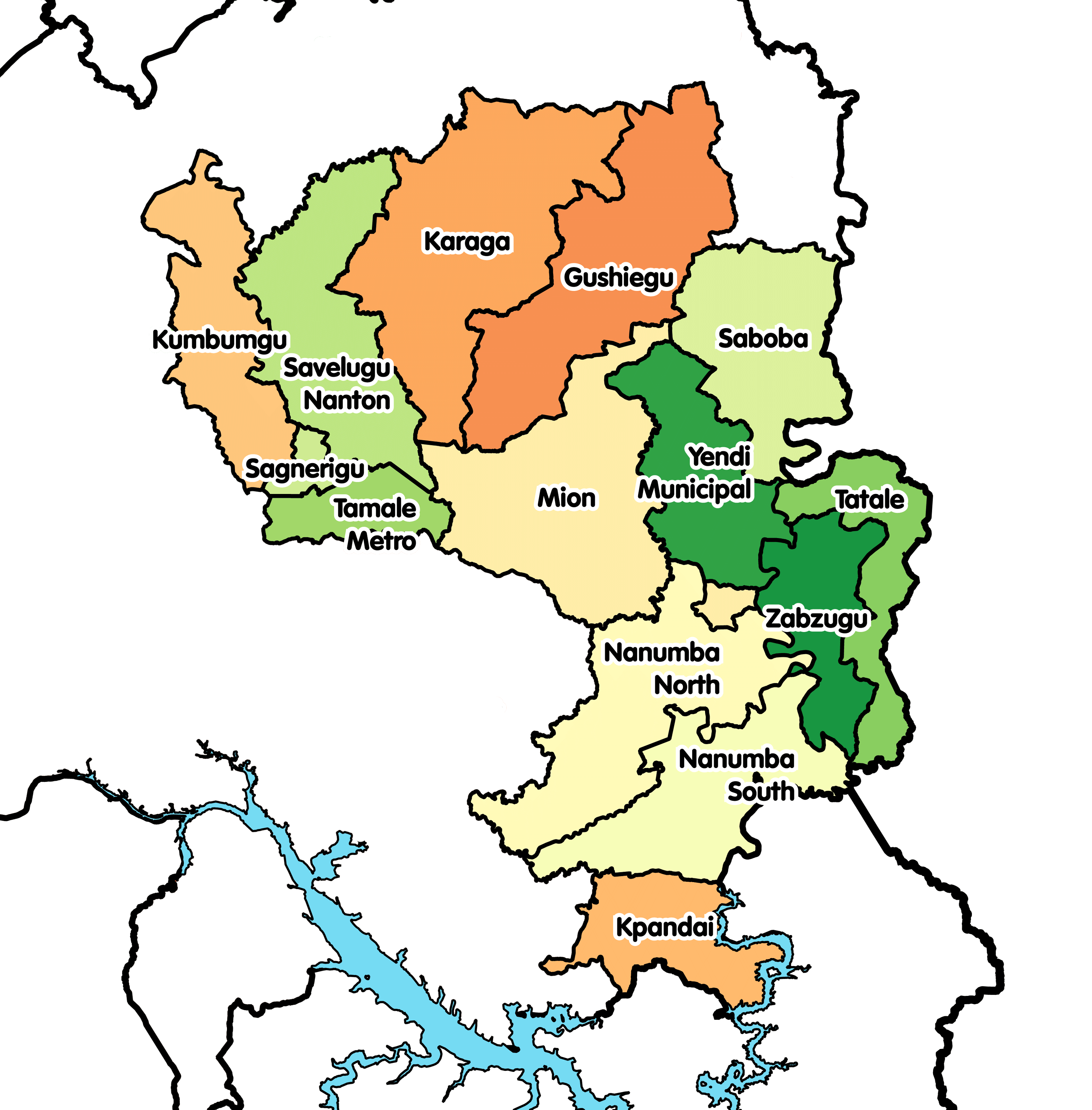
- Districts of Northern Region

- Location of Karaga Municipal District within Northern
- Coordinates: 9°55′29.28″N 0°25′49.8″W
- Country: Ghana
- Region: Northern
- Capital: Karaga

Government
  - District Executive: Mohammed Abdulai Sandow

Area
  - Total: 2,758 km^{2} (1,065 sq mi)

Population (2021)
  - Total: 114,225
  - Density: 41.42/km^{2} (107.3/sq mi)
- Time zone: UTC+0 (GMT)
- ISO 3166 code: GH-NP-KA

Karaga Municipal District is one of the sixteen districts in Northern Region, Ghana. Originally it was formerly part of the then-larger Gushegu-Karaga District in 1988, which was created from the former East Dagomba District Council, until the western part of the district was split off to create Karaga District on 27 August 2004; thus the remaining part has been renamed as Gushegu District, which it was later elevated to municipal district assembly status on that same year to become Gushegu Municipal District. Karaga District itself was elevated to municipal district assembly status in 2024, becoming Karaga Municipal District. The district assembly is located in the northeast part of Northern Region and has Karaga as its capital town.

== Boundaries ==
Karaga Municipal District's western neighbours are Savelugu Municipal District and Nanton District. To the north are West Mamprusi Municipal District and East Mamprusi Municipal District. To the south and east is the Gushegu Municipal District from which Karaga District was carved.

== Sources ==
- "Districts of Ghana". Statoids.
- Karaga District on GhanaDistricts.com
