= Cèsar Puig =

Spanish politician

Cèsar Puig i Casañas (born 1956) is a Spanish politician, jurist and academic. Between 30 June 15 and 27 October 2017 was the Secretary-General of the Ministry of the Interior of the Catalan regional government.

== Biography and career ==
He was born in Valls, province of Tarragona, and graduated in law from the University of Barcelona; since 1987 he has been a civil servant of the Superior Administration Body of the Generalitat and has been a civil servant of the Generalitat's Board of Directors since 1999. He has held various positions in the public administration over the years. Between 1989 and 1999 he was the head of the Territorial Service of Defense and Legal Advice in Tarragona Province, between 2000 and 2004 Director of the Plan of Security of the Chemical Industry of Tarragona same time that held the position of Delegate of the Government in Tarragona.

In 2011, he returned to the Generalitat as Director of Territorial Services of the Department of Territory and Sustainability until 2015, when the Democratic Union of Catalonia left the government, he became the General Secretary of the Interior.

In the academic field, he has been a professor at the Public Administration School of Catalonia from 1990 to 2005, professor at the School of Legal Practice of the Association of Lawyers of Tarragona between 1992 and 2009, Professor of master's degree in Management and Local Law from EAPC, UAB and URV between 2003 and 2015.

== Catalonia independence crisis and trial ==
After the Catalan declaration of independence on 27 October 2017, on 28 October 2017 was dismissed amid the application of article 155 of the Spanish Constitution. On 28 February 2018, was charged by Judge Carmen Lamela for an alleged crime of sedition for his possible connection with the alleged inaction of the members of the people in the referendum on self-determination of October 1 in Catalonia. On 5 May 2018 he was prosecuted for the same offense of sedition and another crime of criminal organization.

On 3 November 2018 the State Attorney General accused him of rebellion in his writing of the trial of Catalonia independence leaders, asking for 11 years in prison and disqualification.

In December 2018, he was appointed General Director of Consultative Services and Legal Coordination of the Legal Office of the Generalitat de Catalunya, replacing Maria Dolors Feliu i Torrent, who had been in charge since 2011.

== See also ==
- 2017–18 Spanish constitutional crisis
