= Sang, Northern Region =

Sang
- Town & District Capital
- Location Sang in Northern region
- Coordinates: 9°25′N 0°17′W
- Country: Ghana
- Region: Northern Region
- Districts: Mion District
- Time zone: GMT
  - Summer (DST): GMT

Sang is a town in the Northern Region of north Ghana. The Mion District is one of the new districts created in 2018 in Ghana. It used to be part of the Yendi Municipal District. It is the capital of the Mion District. The largest town to the west is Tamale and to the east is Yendi.
