= Zabzugu District =

- District
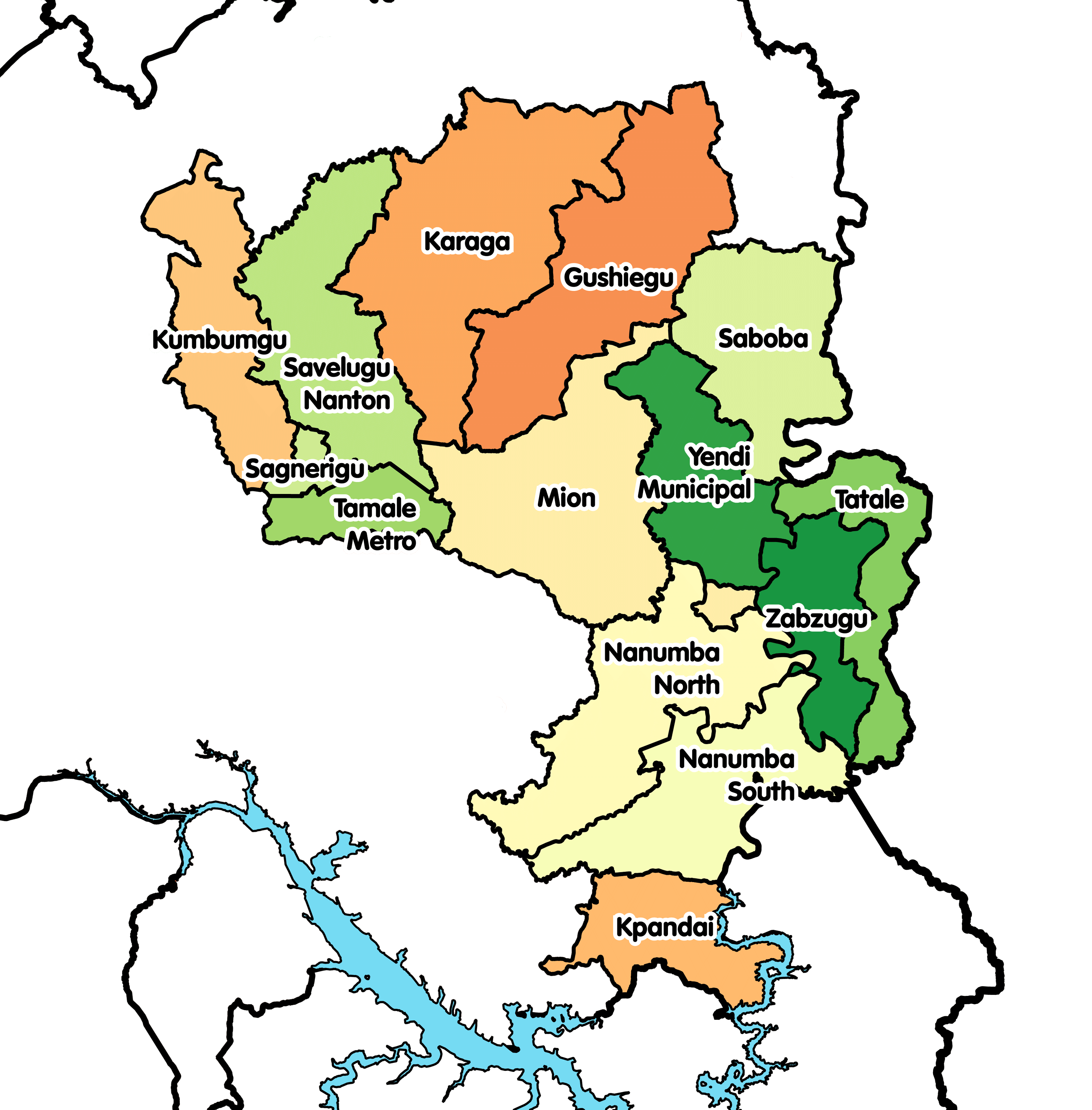
- Districts of Northern Region

- Location of Zabzugu District within Northern
- Coordinates: 9°17′49.2″N 0°22′8.4″E
- Country: Ghana
- Region: Northern
- Capital: Zabzugu

Population (2021)
  - Total: 82,846
- Time zone: UTC+0 (GMT)
- ISO 3166 code: GH-NP-ZB

Zabzugu District is one of the sixteen districts in Northern Region, Ghana. Originally it was formerly part of the then-larger Zabzugu-Tatale District in 1988, which was created from the former East Dagomba District Council, until the northeast part of the district was split off to create Tatale-Sangule District on 28th lJune 2012; thus the remaining part has been renamed as Zabzugu District. The district assembly is located in the eastern part of Northern Region and has Zabzugu as its capital town.
