= Seth Adam Ziblim =

Ghanaian politician

Hon. Seth Adam Ziblim

Member of Parliament for Gushegu constituency
- In office 1 October 1969 – 13 January 1972
- Succeeded by: Abdulai Al-Hassan

Personal details
- Born: 1943 (age 82–83)
- Party: National Alliance of Liberals
- Education: Yendi Middle School, Nyankpala Agricultural College
- Occupation: Politician
- Profession: Agricultural Assistant

Seth Adam Ziblim (born 1943) is a Ghanaian politician and an Agricultural Assistant. He served as member of the first parliament of the second republic of Ghana for the Gushegu constituency in the Northern Region of Ghana.

== Early life and education ==
Ziblim was born in 1943. He is an indigene of the Northern Region and an alumnus of Yendi Middle School where he obtained Middle School Leaving Certificate and after attended Nyankpala Agricultural College where he qualified as an Agricultural Assistant.

== Political career ==
Ziblim represented the Gushegu constituency on the ticket of the National Alliance of Liberals (NAL) in 1969 Ghanaian parliamentary election where he was elected as member of the first parliament of the second republic of Ghana. He was sworn into office on 1 October 1969 and left office on 13 January 1972 after the parliament was dissolved. He preceded Abdulai Al-Hassan who was elected in 1979 Ghanaian general election after his term on the ticket of the Popular Front Party (PFP).

== Personal life ==
Ziblim is a Muslim.
