= Tatale-Sangule District =

District in Northern Region, Ghana

- District
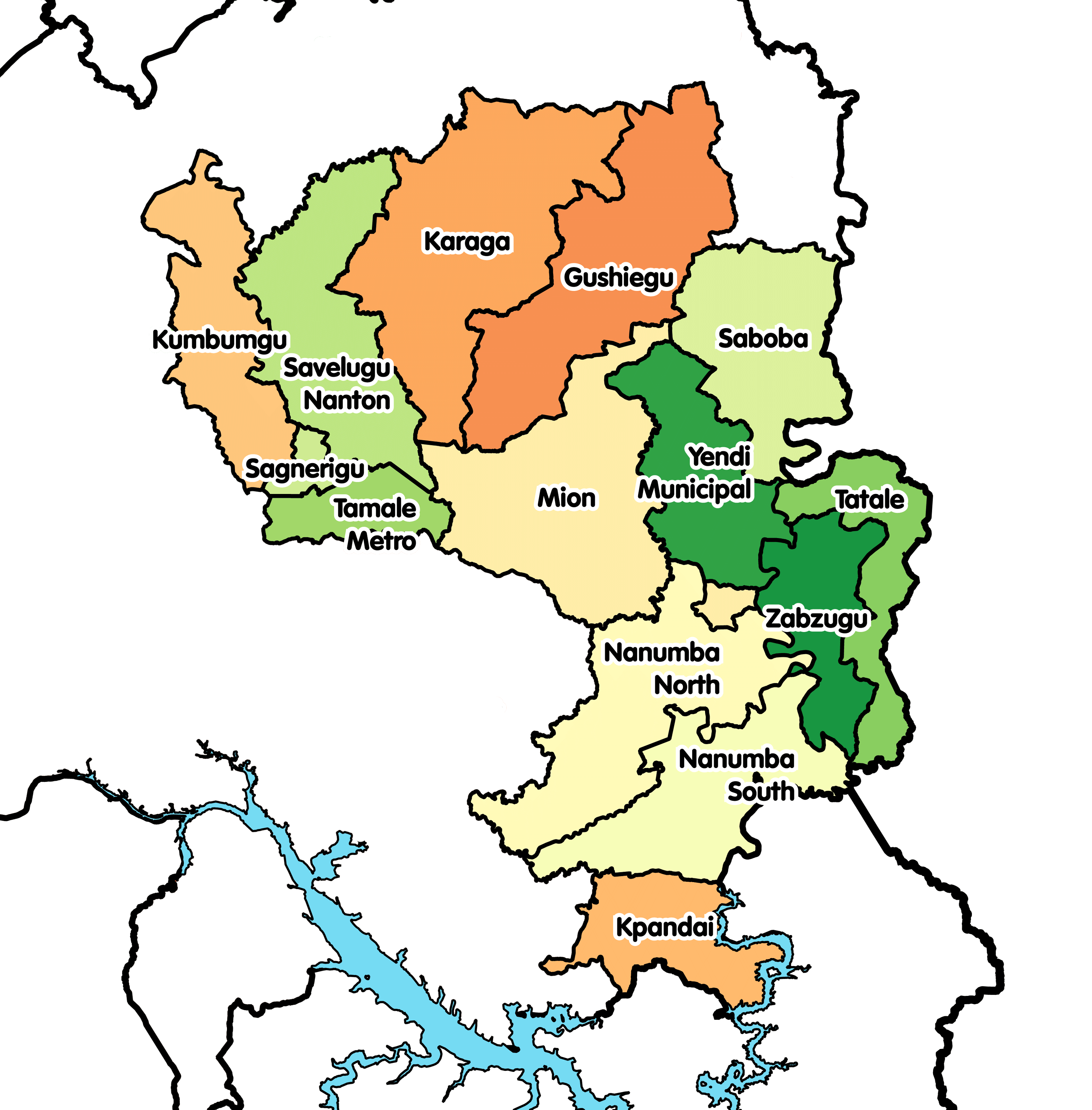
- Districts of Northern Region

- Location of Tatale-Sangule District within Northern
- Coordinates: 9°21′1.08″N 0°31′15.96″E
- Country: Ghana
- Region: Northern
- Capital: Tatale

Population (2021)
  - Total: 74,805
- Time zone: UTC+0 (GMT)
- ISO 3166 code: GH-NP-TS

Tatale-Sangule District is one of the sixteen districts in the Northern Region of Ghana. It was originally part of the then-larger Zabzugu-Tatale District in 1988, which was created from the former East Dagomba District Council. The northeast part of the district was then split off to create Tatale-Sangule District on 28 June 2012; As a consequence the remaining part was renamed as Zabzugu District. The district assembly is located in the eastern part of Northern Region whose capital town is Tatale.
