= Gushegu Municipal District =

Municipal District in Northern Region, Ghana

- Municipal District
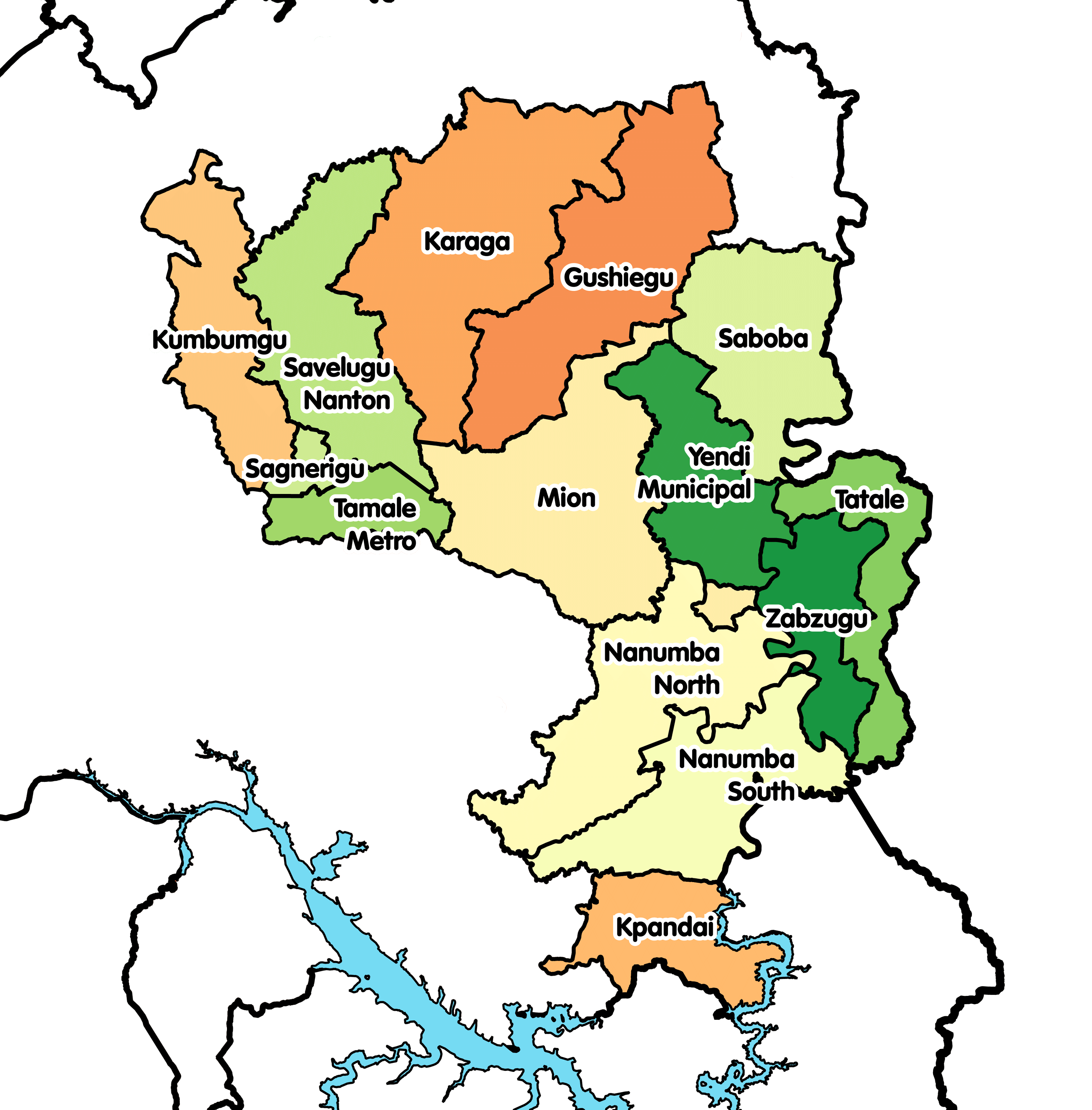
- Districts of Northern Region

- Location of Gushegu Municipal District within Northern
- Coordinates: 9°55′9″N 0°13′5″W
- Country: Ghana
- Region: Northern
- Capital: Gushegu

Government
  - District Executive: Alhassan Fuseini

Area
  - Total: 5,796 km^{2} (2,238 sq mi)

Population (2021)
  - Total: 153,965
- Time zone: UTC+0 (GMT)
- ISO 3166 code: GH-NP-GU

Gushegu Municipal District is one of the sixteen districts in Northern Region, Ghana. Originally it was formerly part of the then-larger Gushegu-Karaga District in 1988, which was created from the former East Dagomba District Council, until the western part of the district was split off to create Karaga District on 27 August 2004; thus the remaining part has been renamed as Gushegu District, which it was later elevated to municipal district assembly status on that same year to become Gushegu Municipal District. The municipality is located in the northeast part of Northern Region and has Gushegu as its capital town.

== Boundaries ==
To the north are East Mamprusi District and West Mamprusi District, to the south the Yendi District. The Saboba-Chereponi District is to the east and the Savelugu-Nanton District lies to the west. Gushegu is 105 kilometres north east of Tamale, the capital of the Northern Region.

== Villages ==
The major and only town is the capital Gushegu, and the major villages in the district are:

- Kpatinga
- Zinindo
- Gaa
- Geluwei
- Nayogu
- Samang/Yapala
- Gbagu
- Limo
- Bulugu
- Nawuhugu
- Watugu
- Nabuli
- Zamanshiju
- Bogu
- Zantili
- Shintoli
- Samtemo
- Pumo
- Gbambu
- Kpatili
- Nyensung
- Gungula
- Sugu
- Gushegu-Kamonaliyi
- Damdaboli
- Ofeni Wawwo
- Zori
- Samanga
- Gmanicheri
- Tintang
- Katani
- Nabuli

== Tourism ==
There are weaving and smock sewing centres at Karaga and Kpatinga. Being developed are the Daka Forest Reserve with a large monkey population and the Karaga Forest Reserve. The Greenwich Meridian passes through Namangbeni.

== Sources ==
- "Districts of Ghana". Statoids.
- GhanaDistricts.com
