= Saani Iddi =

Ghanaian politician (1956–2012)

Member of Parliament for Wulensi Constituency
- In office 7 January 1997 – 6 January 2001
- President: Jerry John Rawlings

Personal details
- Born: 26 May 1956
- Died: 5 June 2012 (aged 56)

Saani Iddi (May 26, 1956 – June 5, 2012) was a Ghanaian politician and an entrepreneur. He was a former Deputy Minister for Water Resources, Works and Housing and a Member of Parliament for Wulensi in the Northern Region of Ghana. Saani was also a former district chief executive of the Nanumba South District.

== Early life ==
Iddi was born on May 26, 1956, and hails from Wulensi in the Northern Region of Ghana. He attained a general certificate of education at the Advanced level.

== Politics ==
Iddi was a member of the Fifth Parliament of the Fourth Republic of Ghana. He was a candidate in the 1996 Ghanaian general election as a representative of the New Patriotic Party and won a seat for the party with a total of 6,636 making 26.70% of the total votes cast that year. He lost his seat in the 2000 Ghanaian general election and was appointed by former president John Agyeikum Kuffour as the District Chief Executive of Nanumba north district. After the New Patriotic Party had lost its term of office in the 2004 Ghanaian general election, he was appointed by the late president Evans Atta Mills as the deputy minister of water resources, works and housing for a year. Iddi contested as an independent candidate in the 2008 Ghanaian general election and won with a total of 10,174 votes. He died during his last year in office.

== Personal life ==
Iddi was a Muslim and was married with seven children. He died at the Korle Bu teaching hospital in Accra after he had been sick for sometime.

== Death ==
He died on June 5, 2012.
