= Rita Tani Iddi =

Ghanaian politician

Hon. Rita Tani Iddi

Member of Parliament for Gushiegu Constituency
- In office 7 January 2005 – 6 January 2009
- President: John Kufuor
- Preceded by: Iddrisu Huudu
- Succeeded by: Thomas Kwesi Nasah

Personal details
- Born: 14 September 1949 (age 76)
- Party: New Patriotic Party
- Education: University of Cape Coast University of Education, Winneba

Rita Tani Iddi is a Ghanaian politician who was the member of parliament for the Gushiegu constituency from 2005 to 2009.

Rita won the Gushiegu seat during the December 2004 general election on the ticket of the New Patriotic Party (NPP) but lost in her next attempt to represent the constituency in the December 2008 general election. While in parliament, she doubled as the deputy Minister for Lands and Natural Resources in charge of Mines. She is currently the deputy Ghana commissioner to the United Kingdom and Ireland.

== Early life and education ==
Tani was born on 14 September 1949. She attended the University of Cape Coast where she attained a Diploma in Home Science, after which she furthered her education at the University of Education, Winneba, where she obtained her Bachelor of Education in Home Science.

== Career ==
Rita Tani Iddi is a teacher by profession, she taught in several schools in Ghana, these included Yendi Senior High School and Berekum Training College. She was appointed a District Chief Executive of the Gushegu District in the Northern Region of Ghana. She also became a member of parliament of the Fourth Parliament for the Fourth Republic of Ghana representing the Gushegu constituency and served as a Deputy Minister for Lands, Forestry and Mines who was in charge of the mines sector during His Excellency the Ex-President of Ghana, John Agyekum Kufuor's administration and was de Deputy High Commissioner for Ghana. Tani Iddi is also a Ghanaian politician.

== Politics ==
Rita Tani is a Ghanaian politician, who contested in the 2004 Ghanaian general elections as a member of parliament for the Gushegu constituency in the Northern Region of Ghana on the ticket of the New Patriotic Party. She won the elections with a total vote cast of 14,643 representing 52.80% over her opponent, Iddrisu Hudu of the National Democratic Congress who obtained 13,108 total votes cast representing 47.20%, making her a member of Parliament for the Fourth Parliament of the Fourth Republic of Ghana.

She also served as the Deputy Minister of Lands, Forestry and Mines in charge of the mines sector during the Kufour's Administration.

== Personal life ==
Rita Tani is Christian by religion.

== See also ==
- List of MPs elected in the 2004 Ghanaian parliamentary election
- Gushiegu (Ghana parliament constituency)
