= Ziblim Iddi =

Ghanaian politician (born 1967)

Member of the Ghana Parliament for Gushegu Constituency
- In office 7 January 2017 – 6 January 2021
- Preceded by: Thomas Kwame Nassa
- Succeeded by: Alhassan Tampuli Sulemana
- Majority: New Patriotic Party (NPP)

Personal details
- Born: 15 September 1967 (age 58) Gushegu, Ghana
- Party: New Patriotic Party
- Spouse: Anda
- Children: 3
- Education: University of Ghana; Clark Atlanta University
- Occupation: Academic and politician
- Profession: Lecturer

Ziblim Iddi (born 15 September 1967) is a Ghanaian politician and was a member of the Seventh Parliament of the Fourth Republic of Ghana, representing the Gushegu Constituency on the ticket of the New Patriotic Party (NPP).

== Education ==
Iddi holds the qualification of doctor of philosophy in political science (international relations and comparative politics) from Clark Atlanta University, in the United States. He also possesses a Bachelor of Arts degree in political science from the University of Ghana and a master's in International Affairs and Development (MIAD) from Clark University.

His areas of expertise include political economy, comparative politics, and international relations.

== Politics ==
Iddi is a member of New Patriotic Party and was a member of parliament for Gushegu constituency in the Seventh Parliament of the Fourth Republic of Ghana.

=== 2016 election ===
Iddi contested the Gushegu constituency on the ticket of New Patriotic Party during the 2016 Ghanaian general election and won with 22,529 votes, representing 54.22% of the total votes. He was elected over Kwesi Thomas Nassan of the National Democratic Congress who polled 18, 479 votes which is equivalent to 44.47%, parliamentary candidate for the Progressive People's Party (PPP) had 316 votes representing 0.76% and Convention People's Party (CPP) parliamentary candidate Issah Baba had 228 votes, representing 0.55% of the total votes.

Iddi stepped down during the 2020 New Patriotic Party primaries.

== Career ==
Iddi worked as a library assistant at the Fulton County Library from 1996 to 2004. From 2004 to 2008, he worked as a teaching assistant at Clark Atlanta University. From 2008 to 2016, he lectured at the University of Ghana.
