= Karaga, Ghana =

Karaga
- District Capital
- Location of Karaga in Northern region
- Coordinates: 9°55′30″N 0°25′47″W
- Country: Ghana
- Region: Northern Region
- District: Karaga District
- Elevation: 197 m (646 ft)

Population (2010)
  - Total: approx. 10,000
- Time zone: GMT
  - Summer (DST): GMT

Karaga is a small town and is the capital of Karaga district, a district in the Northern Region of north Ghana. It has a population of approximately 15,000. Karaga is one of the Principle Towns of the Dagbon empire. Dagbon is a name used for the Dagomba tribe. This tribe is the controlling tribe over a large area including Gushiegu, Yendi, Kpatinga, and other towns stretching from Gushiegu to the Bolga road, and bordering on Nalarigu on the north. The presiding chief is one of three or four powerful chiefs having many sub-chiefs under him.

Karaga has electricity and running water. It has about four dams and numerous boreholes (functioning and non functioning) which provide water for its citizens.

Karaga has a hospital and clinic which can provide basic services, as well as numerous pharmacies spread throughout the town.

Karaga promotes peaceful activities, which include sports, cultural and entertainments. some of the sports teams are Nasara FC, Beimoni FC, Northern Lions, Bamas FC, Wumpini FC, Vision FC and Beiyom soccer ambassadors. There is a football Astro turf field for the sports activities of the district.

There is also community center in the town which is adjacent to the district Hospital and not far from the market.

The largest organized religion in the area is Islam, but the town also has an Assembly of God church, a Pentecostal church and a Korean Missionary outreach.

Animism, or ancestor worship is still widely practiced, involving witch doctors and juju-men. Sacrifice and traditional festivals are still a large part of Dagomba life.

A large market gathers there every six days and provides goods, services and trade for a large area surrounding the town.

Karaga has cellular phone service which provides communication and also data for web-surfing. It is the location of Dizem Bella child and maternal health center, run by Nayina Karim, one of MTN Ghana's 2016 Heroes of Change
