= Fencing tactics =

Movement or approach used in competitive fencing

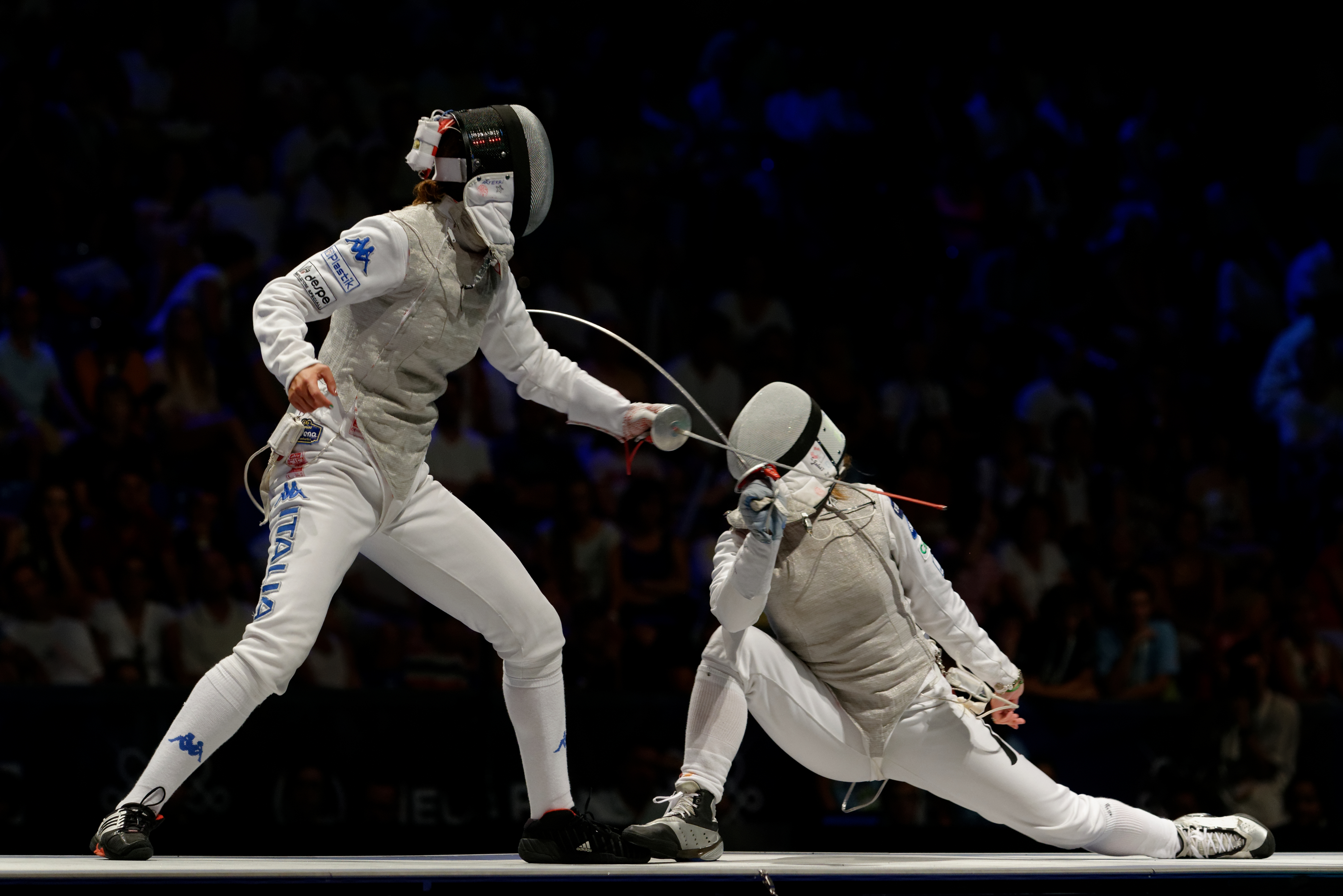
Carolin Golubytskyi (R) lunges to hit Arianna Errigo (L) in the women's foil final of the 2013 World Fencing Championships

Tactics are important to modern fencing and although technique is important in the sport, use of varying tactics helps fencers make the most of that technique.

== Bladework ==
=== Simple attack ===
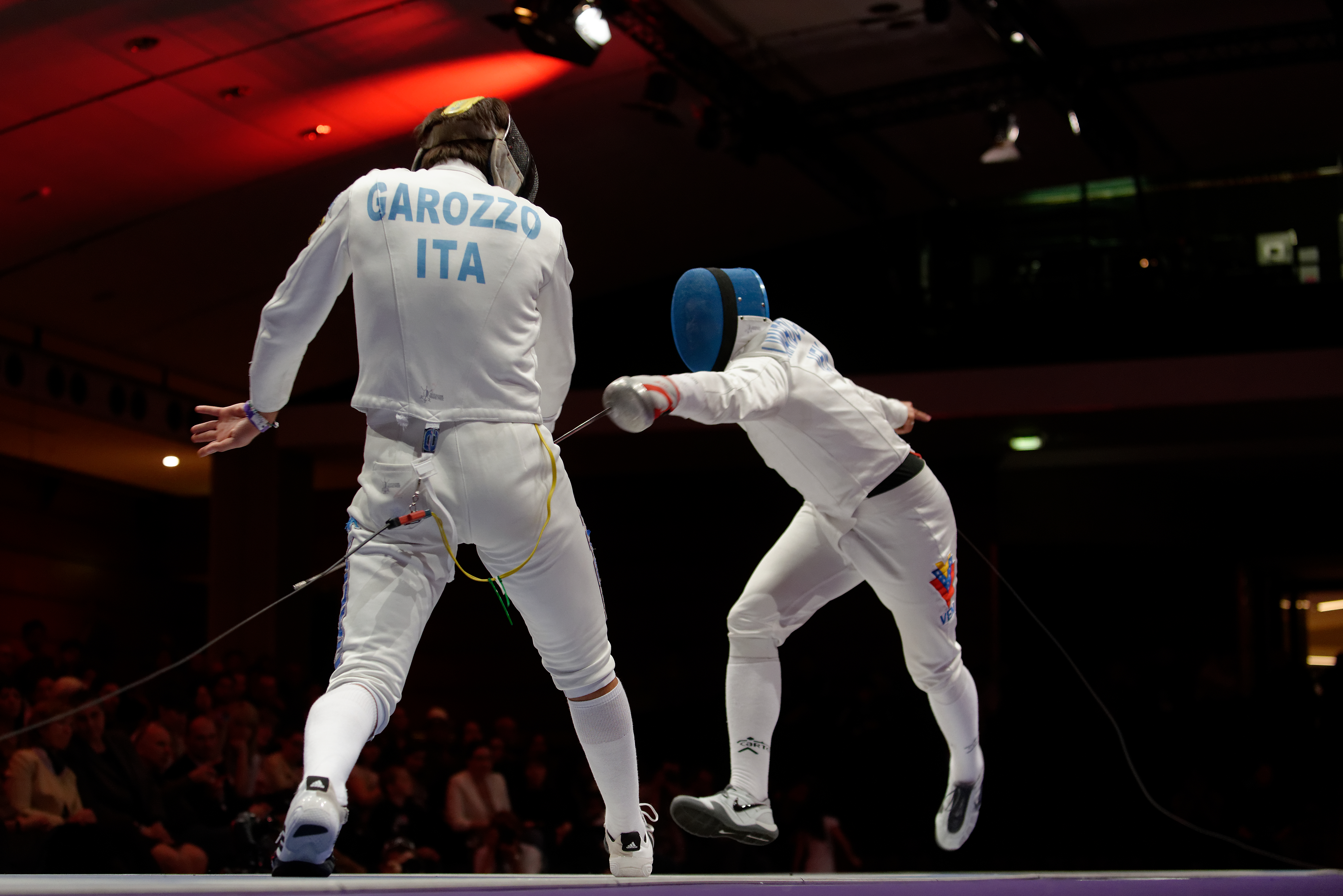
Rubén Limardo (R) attacks Enrico Garozzo with a flèche, team final of the 2013 Trophée Monal

Offensive bladework consists of the various means of scoring a touch on an opponent. The straight attack is a direct extension towards valid target. As it is easily defended against, fencers often use numerous feints to deceive their opponent into parrying and then disengage around the blade. As a preparation for an attack, fencers may execute a prise de fer, or attack on the blade. This includes the simple beat, a sharp rap on the opponent's blade, and the more complex bind, in which the fencer forces the opponent's blade to a different line.

Composed of one move (a thrust, lunge or fleche), the simple attack is normally countered with a parry riposte, parrying (blocking or pushing aside) the opponent's blade and then attacking with this tactic. It can also be countered with a thrust in some situations. They are most effective when the distance between the fencers is small enough that the opponent cannot execute a parry riposte. Often fencers will try to close distance before mounting a simple attack to use this to their advantage. Sometimes, a fencer will make a simple attack and when the opponent parries, the fencer can then make a counter parry and riposte.

=== Combined attack ===
The combined attack (also known as the compound attack) can be quite effective, despite its vulnerability to counter-attack. A fencer using the compound attack makes a feint, prompting the opponent to parry and makes an indirect attack in response.

=== Feint ===
This attack is where you point your blade at your opponent. Your opponent will try to parry it, but you will disengage and touch.

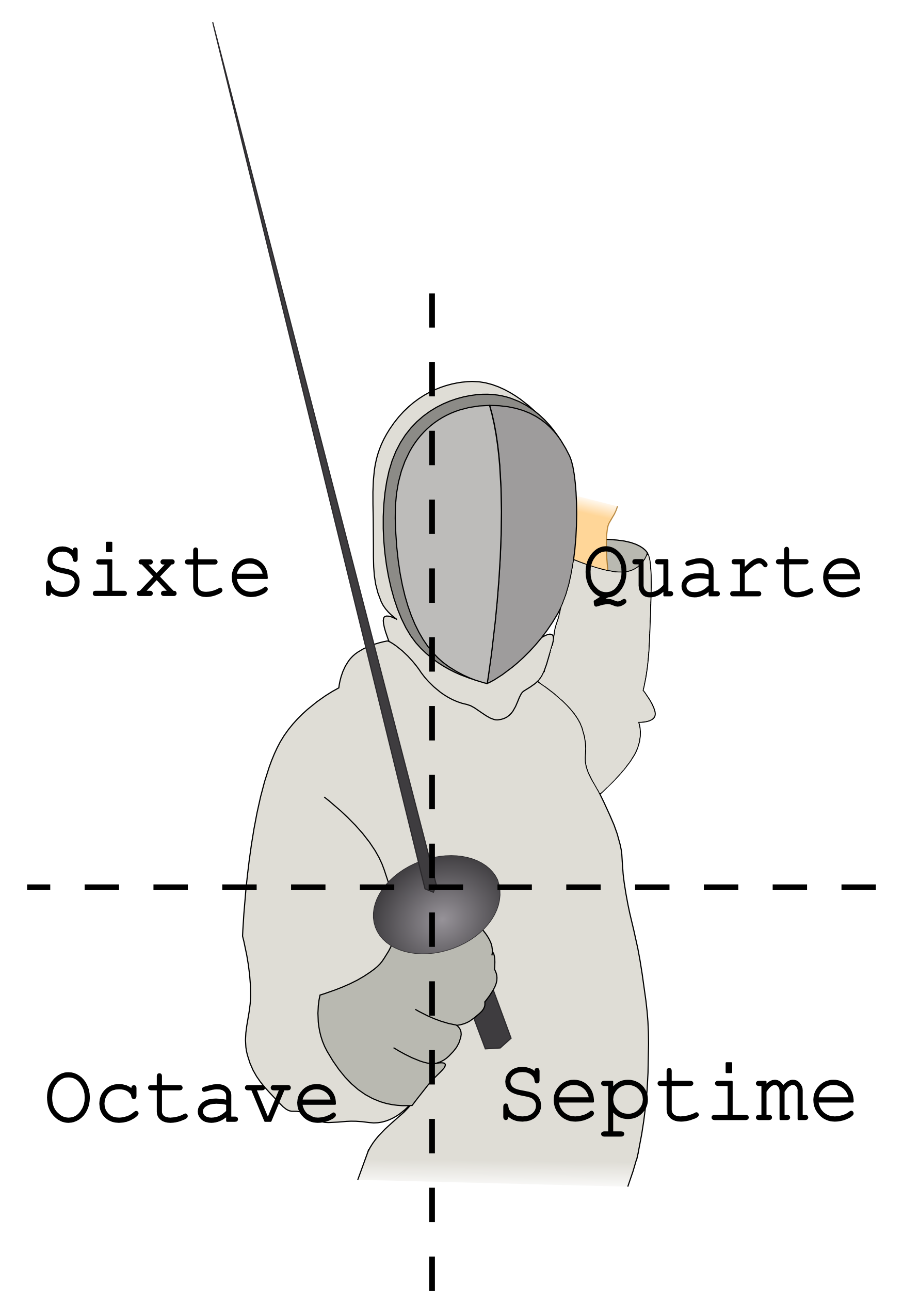
The lines in fencing

=== Parry ===
A fencer deflects or blocks the opponent's blade with their own to defend themselves. This is usually followed by a riposte.

The nine classical parries comprise basic bladework. The first parry that most fencers learn is quarte, known commonly as "parry four". Parries are named for the line that they defend from attack: parry four would defend line four, which is the high inside line.

=== Parry and Riposte ===
The parry riposte uses the strength of one's own blade to avoid the opponent's. After performing it, the fencer then counters the attack with a combined attack which would force the opponent to parry, allow you to counter parry the opponent's blade, and allow you to penetrate their next parry to win.

=== Counter-attack ===
An offensive action executed into an opponent's attack. A fencer might choose to counterattack if they believe their opponent's attack will miss, or they might combine the counterattack with an evasive action (such as ducking beneath the opponent's attack) or simultaneously using their blade to deflect their opponent's attack during the counterattack (called a counterattack "in opposition").

== Footwork ==
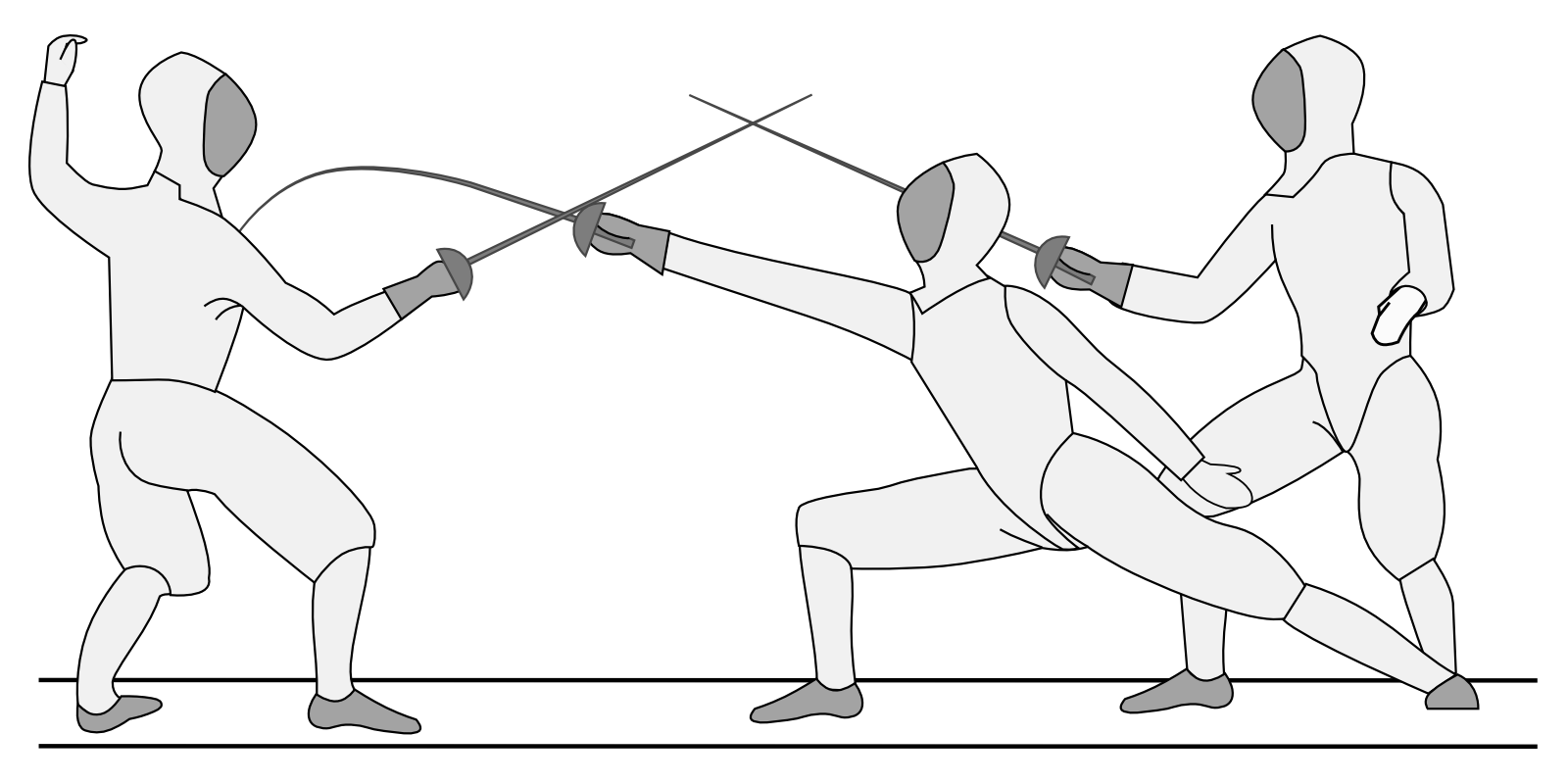
The lunge position on the right, showing how much more distance can be obtained over the en garde stance

In a fencing bout, a great deal depends on being in the right place at the right time. Fencers are constantly manoeuvring in and out of each other's range, accelerating, decelerating, changing directions and so on. All this has to be done with minimum effort and maximum grace, which makes footwork arguably the most important aspect of a fencer's training regimen. In fact, in the first half of the 20th century it was common practice to put fencers through six months to a year of footwork before they were ever allowed to hold a sword. This practice has now been largely abandoned.

Modern fencing tends to be quite linear. This is due to the width of the piste — no more than 2 m — and rules dictating a halt once fencers come into contact, pass each other, or turn their backs.

These rules may reflect older dueling styles and the changing nature of weapons: Sideways movement, which was a common defense against an attack with a comparatively unwieldy weapon like the rapier, became an unreliable tactic when faced with smaller, much lighter weapons. In contemporary sport fencing defense by footwork usually takes the shape of moving either directly away from your opponent (out of his/her range) or directly towards him/her (making the attack "overshoot").

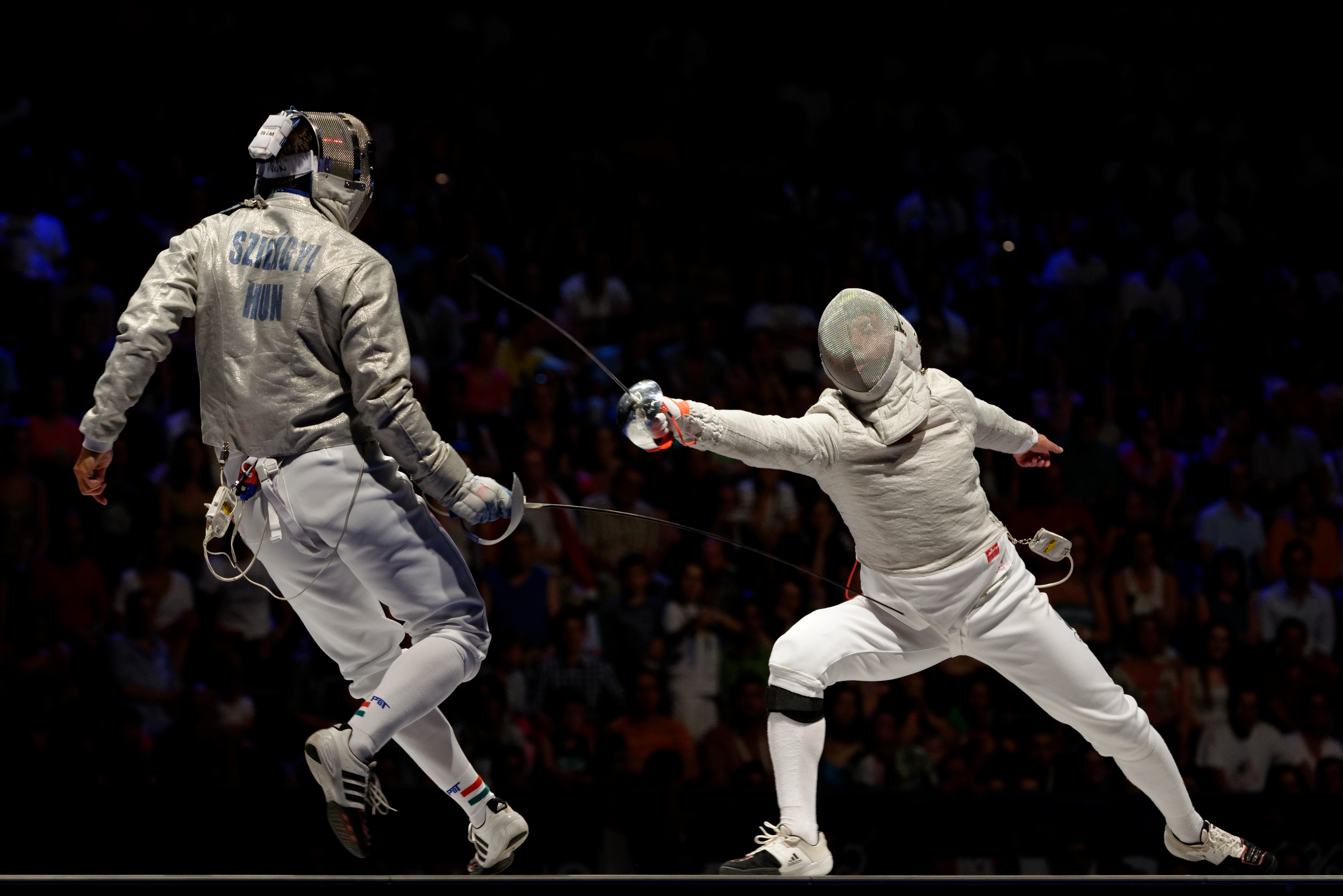
Áron Szilágyi (L) uses defensive footwork to get out of Nikolay Kovalev's range in the men's sabre semi-final of the 2013 World Fencing Championships

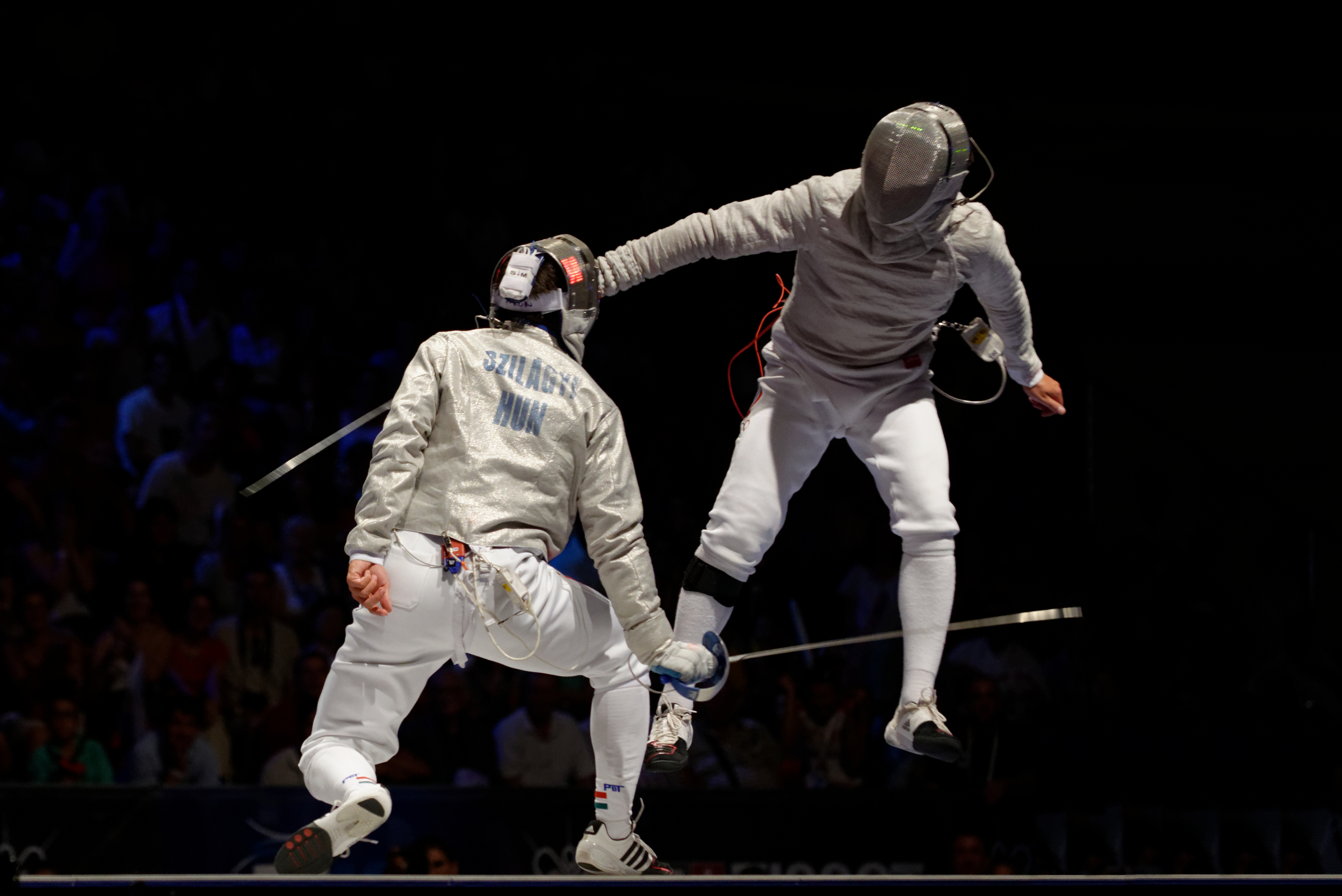
Nikolay Kovalev (R) leaps to avoid Áron Szilágyi's attack in the men's sabre semi-final of the 2013 World Fencing Championships

The fencing stance and movements may appear artificial, but they have evolved over centuries of trial and error to afford optimal protection and mobility. Fencers tend to stand somewhat side-on to the principal direction of movement (the fencing line), leading with the weapon side (right for a right-hander, left for a left-hander). In this fencing stance the feet are a shoulder-width or more apart with the leading foot forward and the trailing foot at right angles to it. Finally, the knees are well bent and the center of gravity is kept midway between the heels. The fencer is now in a position where he/she is well balanced, able to use his/her leg muscles to generate rapid bursts of speed and change directions with comparative ease. In foil and épée, particularly, this stance decreases the vulnerable target area. Further, and more importantly, it maintains balance and ease of movement both forward and backward.

The most common way of delivering an attack in fencing is the lunge, where the fencer reaches out with his/her front foot and straightens his/her back leg. This maneuver has the advantage of allowing the fencer to maintain balance while covering far more distance than in a single step, yet still allowing a return to the more defensive fencing stance.

Sometimes fencers do take the more "natural" kind of steps, where the back foot passes the front foot. These are usually referred to as cross-steps. While cross-steps do have the advantage of range and speed, they may put a fencer in an awkward and frequently unbalanced position mid-step.

A somewhat exaggerated version of the cross-step, sometimes used to deliver an attack in foil or épée, is the flèche ("arrow" in French). In the flèche, the fencer leans forward and takes a long running cross-step, generating most of the thrust with his/her front leg. Ideally, the hit delivered with a flèche should arrive as or just before the fencer's front foot hits the ground. When (as often happens) the flèching fencer runs past the defender the defender is allowed to finish a defensive action, generally a riposte following a parry.

In sabre forward cross-steps were prohibited in the 1990s, one of numerous efforts to increase the sport's popular appeal. This also removed distortions caused by the introduction of electronic scoring where sabre bouts degenerated to both parties charging to get the hit in first before passing their opponent and therefore ceasing to be a valid target.

Variations and portions of the above movements can also be used by themselves. For example, a check-step forward is performed by moving the back foot as in a retreat, then performing an entire advance. This manoeuvre can trick your opponent into thinking that you are retreating, when in reality you are about to close distance.

Other footwork actions include the appel (French for "call"), which is a stomp designed to upset the opponent's perception of rhythm, and the ballestra, which is a "hopping" step occasionally used as a preparation for attacks (the back foot leaves the ground, while the front foot is still in mid-air; both feet come down at the same time).

In general, Olympic fencing has put a premium on balance, speed, and athleticism in footwork, somewhat diluting orthodoxies regarding the classical stances and methods. To a degree, this has led to increasing resemblance between fencing footwork and that of other martial arts, with the significant caveat that a scoring "touch" requires almost no power behind the blow, only timing and the ability to manipulate distance.

== Tactical wheel ==
The tactical wheel is a visual representation which can help people understand how and when many tactics should be used. It also illustrates how different fencing tactics can be countered. It is also important to think ahead about an opponent's strategy, for expert players, even as far as four moves ahead, while minding your vulnerability to attack.
