= Tatale =

District capital of Tatale-Sanguli District, Ghana

Coordinates: 9.357°N 0.527°E

Tatale is a commercial town in Tatale Sangule District in the Northern Region of Ghana. Layout of the town is part nuclear and part linear. Its inhabitants are diverse in ethnicity with the Basares who speak Ntcham as their official language being the majority. The only Senior High School in the district is Tatale Evangelical Presbyterian Agric Senior High School. Market day in Tatale occurs once a week and is attended by many people from both far and near communities including Togolese. The Zabarma people (mostly traders) are frequent in the market center every week and the district is largely rural, with approximately 90% of the population engaged in local agriculture, hence subsistence agriculture is the economic norm in the Tatale Sangule district.

The district enjoys the services of three telecommunication service providers namely Telecel Ghana which provides fixed line services as well as cellular network, MTN Ghana, and AirtelTIGO provide only cellular services.
