= Thomas Kwesi Nasah =

Ghanaian politician

Thomas Kwesi Nasah (born March 5, 1972) is a Ghanaian politician and member of the Sixth Parliament of the Fourth Republic of Ghana representing the Gushiegu Constituency in the Northern Region on the ticket of the National Democratic Congress.

== Early life and education ==
Nasah was born on March 5, 1972. He hails from Zamamshiegu, a town in the Northern Region of Ghana. He graduated from Salaga Secondary School, Ghana and obtained his GCE Ordinary Level in 1992.

== Career ==
Thomas was an entrepreneur, farmer and agriculturist. He was also part of Business Committee, Committee on Poverty Reduction Strategy, Works and Housing.

== Politics ==
Nasah is a member of the National Democratic Congress (NDC). In 2012, he contested for the Gushiegu seat on the ticket of the NDC sixth parliament of the fourth republic and won. He began his political career in 2009 after being declared winner of the 2008 Ghanaian General Elections for his constituency and elected into the 5th Parliament of the 4th Republic.

== Personal life ==
Nasah is a Christian and attends Church of Pentecost. He is married with five children.
