= Zabzugu =

- District Capital
- Location of Zabzugu in Northern region
- Coordinates: 9°17′N 0°22′E
- Country: Ghana
- Region: Northern Region
- District: Zabzugu-Tatale District
- Elevation: 505 ft (154 m)

Population (2013)
  - Total: —
- Time zone: GMT
  - Summer (DST): GMT

Zabzugu is a small town and the capital of Zabzugu district, a district in the Northern Region of Ghana. It has a nucleated settlement and is less populated. Most of the people there are farmers, and their main produce is yam and maize.

== Education ==
The only senior high school in the district is Zabzugu Senior High School.

== Demography ==
The population of Zabzugu District, according to the 2010 Population and Housing Census, is 63,815 representing 2.6 percent of the region's population. Males constitute 49.1 percent, and females represent 50.9 percent. The proportion of the population living in rural localities is (68%) higher than that living in rural localities by (32%) of the district's population. The district has a sex ratio of 96.3. The population of the district is youthful (46.5% of the population is below 15 years) depicting a broad base population pyramid which tapers off with a small number of elderly persons (60 years and older) representing 5.3 percent. The total age dependency ratio for the district is 100.2, and the age dependency ratio for rural localities is (109.3) higher than that of urban localities, which is (83.1).

== Economy of the District ==
The district had an active labour force of 34,168 in 2010 out of which 27,267 were gainfully employed. Among those employed, 86.3 percent are employed in agriculture, forestry, and fishery-related occupations, while 4.0 percent are engaged in crafts and related trade. The common food products cultivated in the district include yam, maize, millet, rice, cassava and groundnuts. The main cash crop produced is the shea nut, which is grown in the wild. Goats and sheep are the small ruminants reared in the district. They are often sold during the lean season (May to July) to meet the food needs of households. The district enjoys the services of Zabzugu Rural Bank, Multi Credit and GN savings and Loans Company formerly GN bank.

== Transportation system ==
The district's major source of transportation is road transport, with motor vehicles and bikes as the main means of transportation. The district is spanned by 402 km of feeder roads network, which links the district capital to other communities as well as other neighbouring districts.

== Tourism ==
Naa Zangina's Grave at Sabare, Naa Zangina's Mosque at Sabare, Water Falls, the Steep Slope at Kukuokpanga, Checheboni Waterfalls at Mogneigu, and the Grave Yard of Spiritual leaders at Sabare have much untapped tourism potential.

== Telecommunication ==
The district enjoys the services of three telecommunication service providers, namely Vodafone Ghana, which provides fixed-line and cellular service, and MTN Ghana and AirtelTIGO which provide only cellular services.
