= Public Administration School of Catalonia =

Public educational organisation

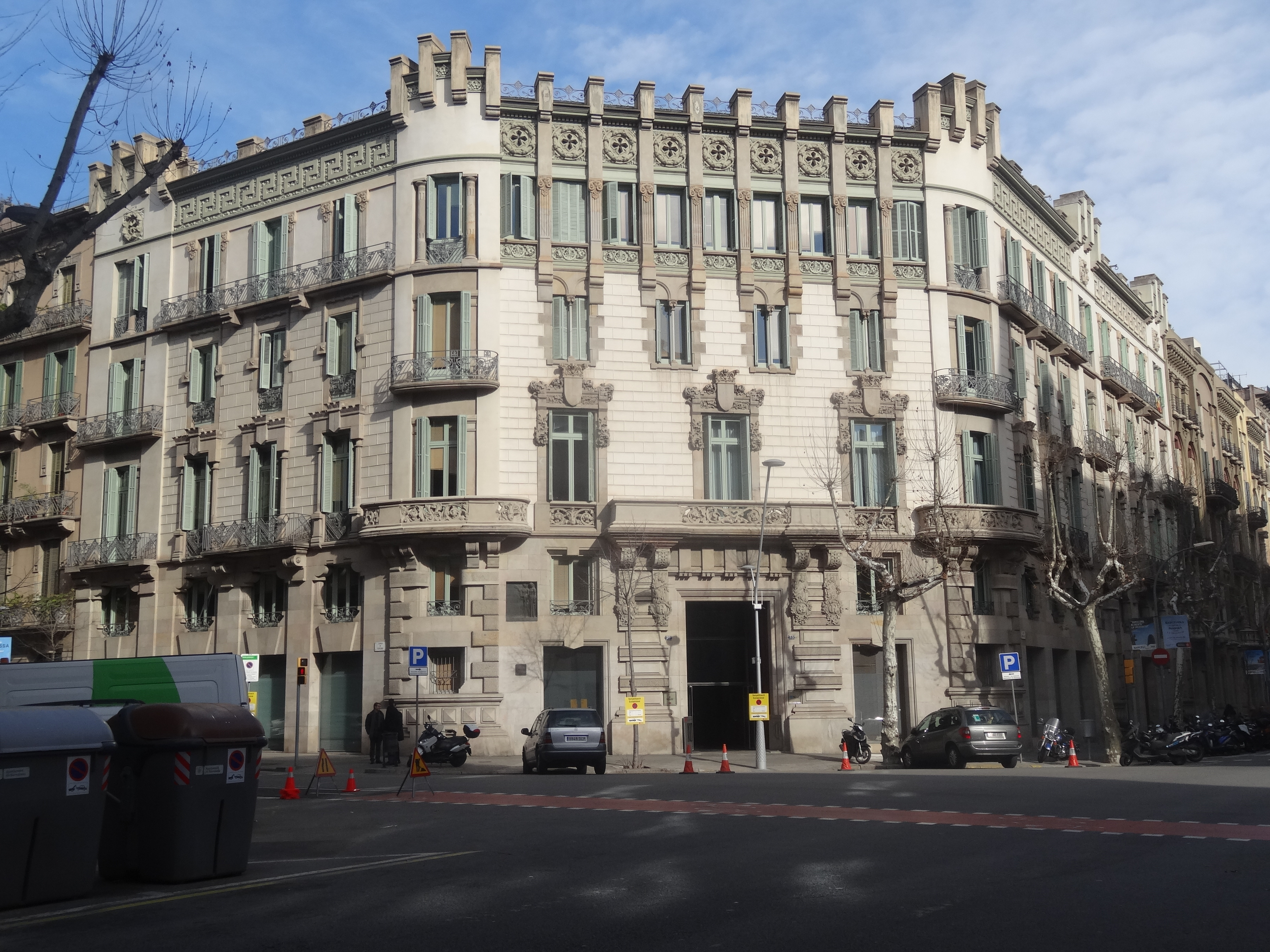

The Public Administration School of Catalonia is a public organisation, founded in 1912 by Enric Prat de la Riba, currently falls under the Ministry of Governance and Public Administration of the Generalitat of Catalonia. At that time, it was the second European school dedicated to research and training in the field of public administration. The first one was settled in Düsseldorf.

Practical and professional training was the main objective for Regenerationism of that time, as well as knowledge in legal and administrative affairs. It was necessary to get public servants trained in all professional fields and adapt the educational system to the new productive needs of the Catalan industrial process and the new local policy, as a means to achieve the cohesion of the Catalan territory.

== History ==
In the first report on the proposal for the creation of the Commonwealth of Catalonia, the convenience of creating a school of civil servants was advocated to provided them with basic knowledge on administrative law and accountability for municipalities. This was reflected in the functioning of the public administrations of the industrialized countries of Europe. In parallel to the training given at the School from 1914, whose director was Isidre Lloret i Massaguer, civil servant of Barcelona City Council and professor of municipal law, the School organized the "municipal weeks", which were celebrated every year and important issues for the councils were discussed.

In 1924 - under the name of School of Administration - it was closed by the dictatorship of Primo de Rivera and was reopened in 1930 under the name of Public Administration School. Once the Republican Generalitat was established, and until 1939, it became the Public Administration School of the Generalitat of Catalonia.

In 1979, the institution was restored under the current name. Nowadays, its strategic guidelines are:

- Implement a model geared towards the academic, political, administrative, and humanist training of the Catalan public Administration's personnel.
- Adapt the services and resources, addressed to all personnel in the Catalan public Administration, to the political and social demands and requirements of the 21st century.
- Place the School among the main international benchmarks in the continued training of leaders and managers in the public sector.
- Strengthen the School's relationship with the Catalan university system and with similar international centres through active cooperation and collaboration in the areas of public sector training and research.

In 2012, the School was rewarded with the St. George's Cross.

== Directors ==
- Isidre Lloret i Massaguer, 1914–1922
- Ramon Coll i Rodés, 1923–1924
  - [The School was suspended for the dictatorship of Primo de Rivera]
- Ramon Coll i Rodés, 1930–1936
- Frederic Culí i Verdaguer, 1936
- Josep Xirau i Palau, 1937-1938?
  - [The School was suspended for the dictatorship of Franco]
- Josep Maria Vallès i Casadevall, 1979–1980
  - Martí Pagonabarraga i Garro, 1980-1980 (acting)
- Josep-Enric Rebés i Solé, 1980–1989
  - Eduard Sànchez i Monjo, 1989-1989 (acting)
- Joaquim Ferret i Jacas, 1989–1996
- Simó Aliana i Magrí, 1996–1999
- Josep Maria Guinart i Solà, 2000–2003
  - Maria Teresa Martí i Castro, 2003-2004 (acting)
- Rut Carandell i Rieradevall, 2004–2006
- Juli Ponce i Solé, 2006
  - Maria Teresa Aragonès i Perales, 2006-2007 (acting)
- Carles Ramió i Matas, 2007–2011
- Montserrat de Vehí i Torra, 2011–2015
  - Meritxell Masó i Carbó, 2015-2016 (acting)
- Agustí Colomines i Companys, 2016–2018
  - Meritxell Masó i Carbó, 2018 (acting)
  - Xavier Gatius i Garriga, 2018-2020 (acting)
- Marta Felip i Torres, 2020–2021
- Ismael Peña-López, 2021–present
