= Yendi Municipal District =

Municipal District in Northern Region, Ghana

Yendi Municipal District Naa Ya which means, The King's City
- Municipal District
- Nickname: Sankara Yili
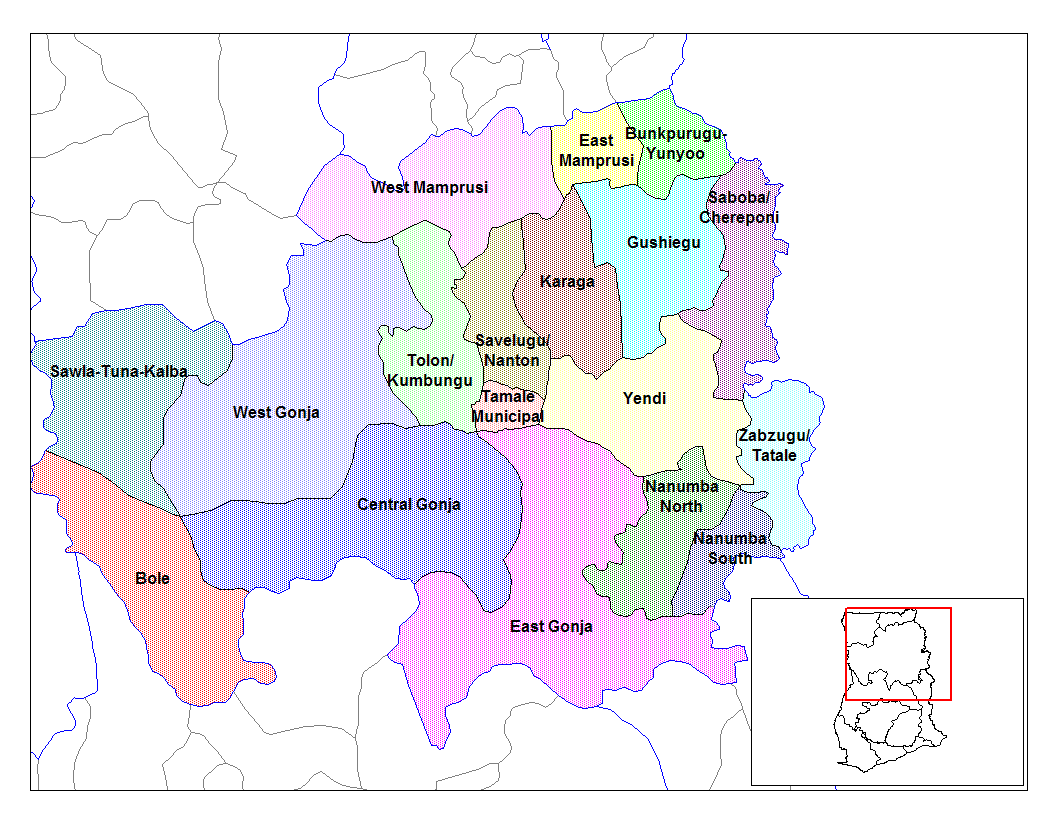
- Districts of Northern Region

- Location of Yendi Municipal District within Northern
- Coordinates: 9°26′26.88″N 0°0′21.24″W
- Country: Ghana
- Region: Northern
- Capital: Yendi

Government
  - Municipal Chief Executive: Issah Zakaria

Population (2021 census)
  - Total: 154,421
- Time zone: UTC+0 (GMT)
- ISO 3166 code: GH-NP-YE

Yendi Municipal District is one of the sixteen districts in Northern Region, Ghana. Originally created as an ordinary district assembly in 1988 when it was known as Yendi District, which was created from the former East Dagomba District Council, until it was elevated to municipal district assembly status on 29 February 2008 to become Yendi Municipal District. However, on 28 June 2012, the western part of the district was later split to create Mion District with the remaining part retained as Yendi Municipal District. The municipality is located in the central part of Northern Region and has Yendi as its capital town.

== History ==
Yendi is also the capital of the ancient Dagbon Kingdom. Yendi in the 17th century was the centre of commerce for the whole of the Gold Coast until colonial rule.

Bowdich, T. E. on his Mission from Cape Coast to Ashanti 1819 notes:

"177 7 days from Sallagah NE according to the Moors through the Inta town of Zongoo is Yahndi (Yendi) the capital of Dagombas.

178 Yahndi is described to be beyond comparison larger than Kumasi, the houses much better built and ornamented. Ashantis lost themselves in the streets. The King Nana Taquanee, has been converted by the Moors, who have settled there in great numbers. The markets at Yahndi are described as animated scenes of commerce, constantly crowded with merchants from almost all countries of the interior. Horses and cattle abound. Yahndi is named after the numeral one, from its pre-eminence.

179 One day from Sallagha, towards Yahndi, and scarcely one journey westward from the latter is the river Laka, described to be as large and as rapid as the Volta which it joins below Odentee.

188 The bush or country people of Dagwumba have three light cuts on each cheek bone and three below, with one horizontal under the eye; those of Yahndi three deep continued cuts These cuts are made during infancy, to insinuate fetish liquids to invigorate and preserve the child."

== Sources ==
- "Districts of Ghana". Statoids.
- GhanaDistricts.com
