= East Dagomba District =

- Former District Council
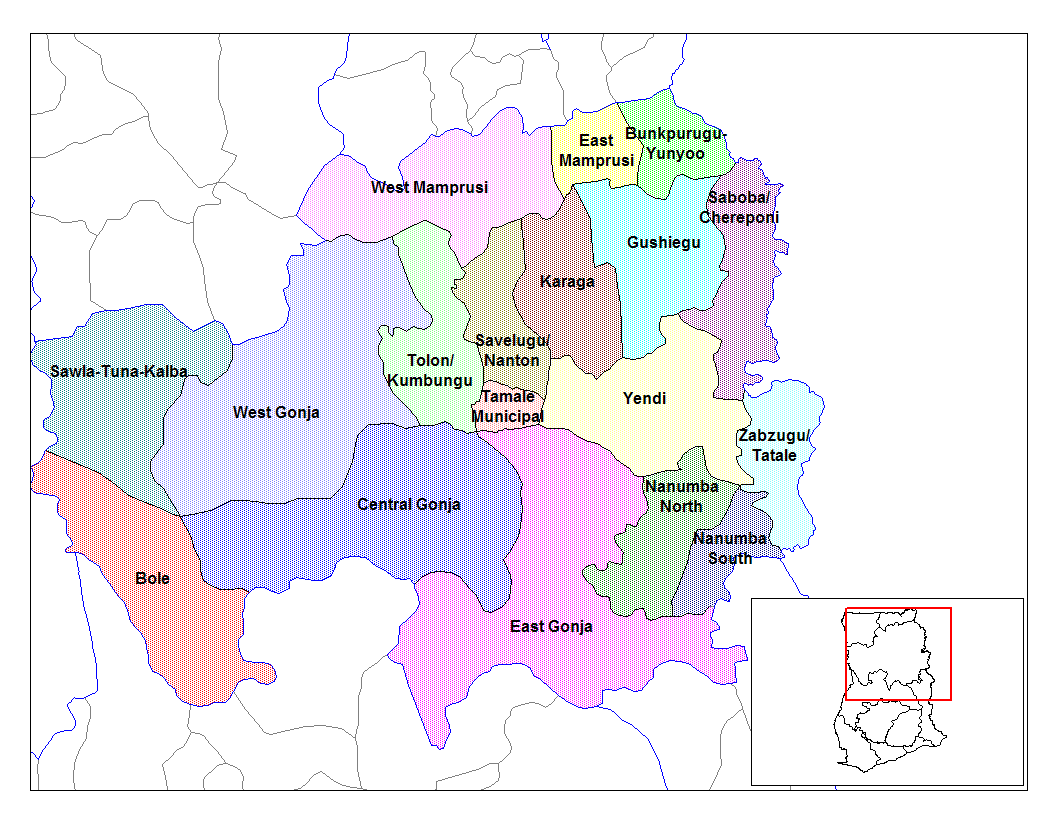
- Districts of Northern Region

- Location of East Dagomba District within Northern
- Coordinates: 9°26′26.88″N 0°0′21.24″W
- Country: Ghana
- Region: Northern
- Capital: Yendi
- Time zone: UTC+0 (GMT)
- ISO 3166 code: GH-NP-__

East Dagomba District is a former district council that was located in Northern Region, Ghana. Originally created as an ordinary district assembly in 1975. However, on 1988, it was split off into four new district assemblies: Yendi Municipal District (capital: Yendi), Gushegu-Karaga District (capital: Gushegu), Saboba-Chereponi District (capital: Saboba) and Zabzugu-Tatale District (capital: Zabzugu). The district assembly was located in the eastern part of Northern Region and had Yendi as its capital town.
