= Gushegu =

Gushegu Gushiego Gushiago
- District Capital
- Location of Gushegu in Northern region
- Coordinates: 9°55′9″N 0°13′5″W
- Country: Ghana
- Region: Northern Region
- District: Gushegu District
- Elevation: 643 ft (196 m)

Population (2013)
  - Total: —
- Time zone: GMT
  - Summer (DST): GMT

Gushegu is the capital city of the Gushegu District, a district located in the Northern Region of Ghana. It is an important city in the Kingdom of Dagbon. It is located in the eastern part of Dagbong with Naa Yab' Gushe-Naa as its traditional head.

== Economic activities ==
Majority of the people of Gushegu are farmers and the rest are traders and some has a handwork.

== Notable people ==
Yakubu Andani
