= Northern Region (Ghana) =

Region of Ghana

Coordinates: 9°30′N 1°00′W

- Region
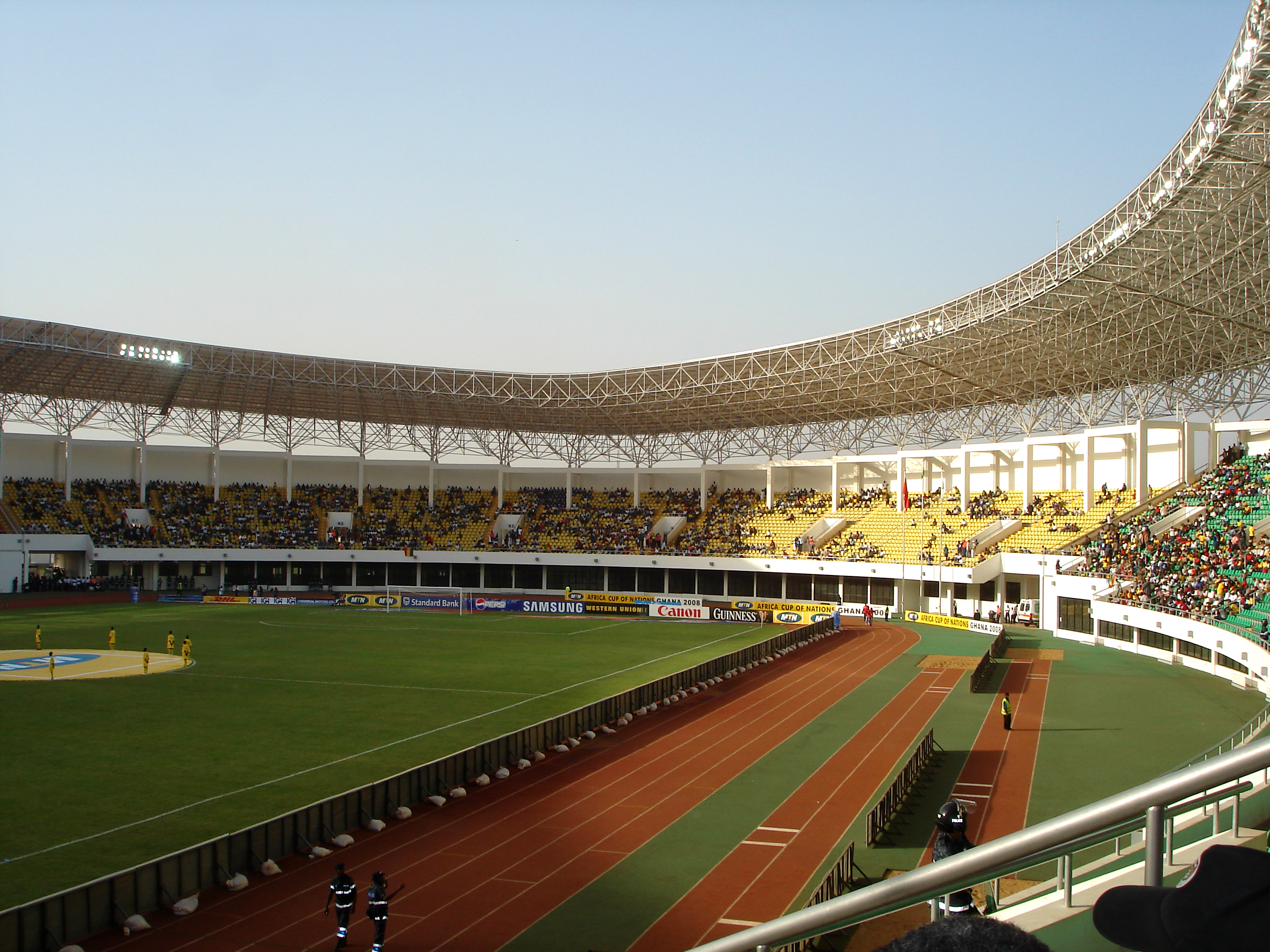
- Tamale Stadium

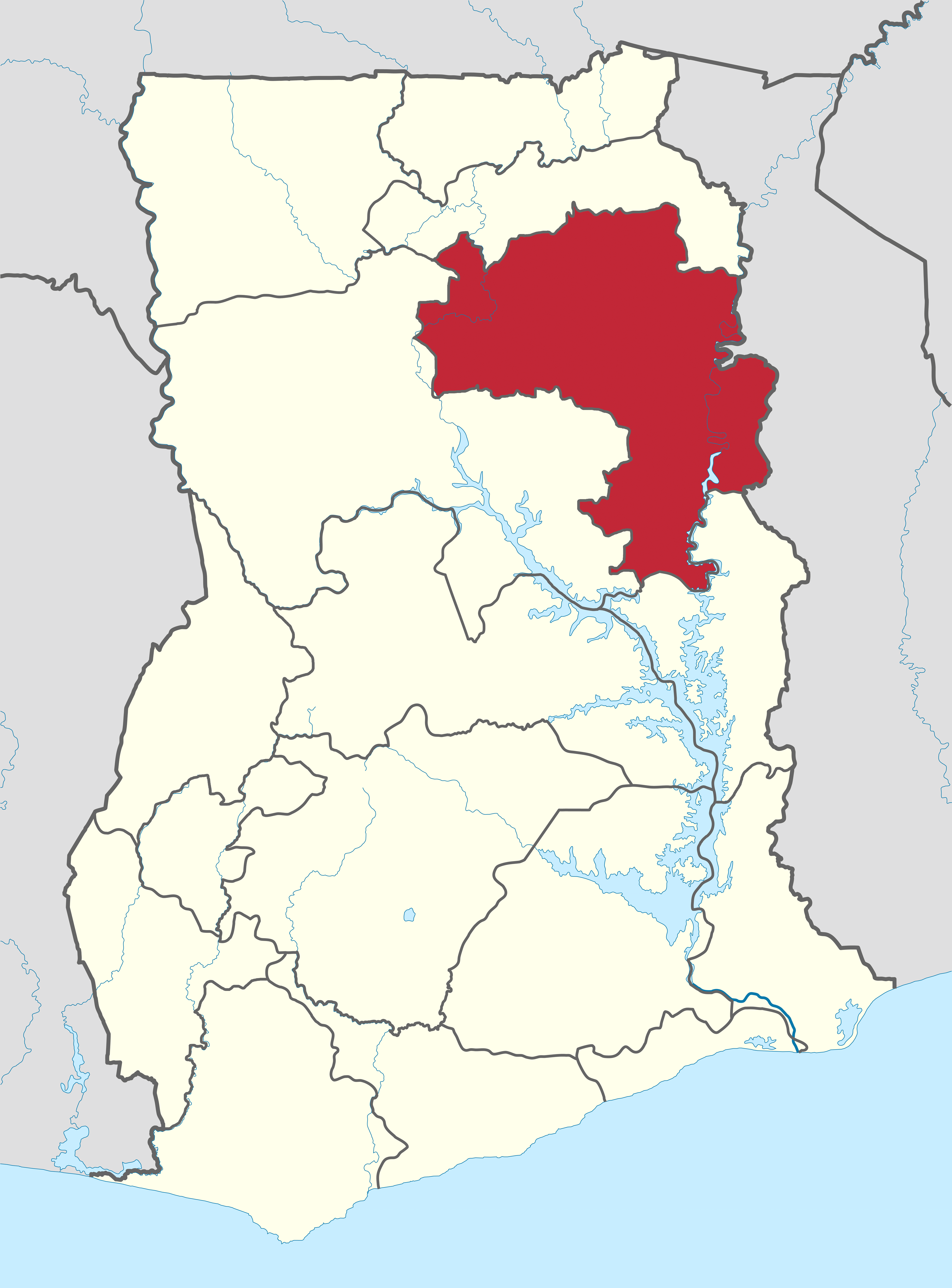
- Location of Northern Region in Ghana
- Country: Ghana
- Capital: Tamale
- Districts: 16

Government
  - Regional Minister: Ali Adolf John

Area
  - Total: 26,534 km^{2} (10,245 sq mi)

Population (2021 Census)
  - Total: 2,310,939
  - Density: 87.094/km^{2} (225.57/sq mi)

GDP (PPP)
  - Year: 2013
  - Per capita: $5,150

GDP (Nominal)
  - Year: 2018
  - Per capita: $2,500
- Time zone: GMT
- Area code: 037
- ISO 3166 code: GH-NP
- HDI (2021): 0.539 low · 10th

The Northern Region is one of the sixteen regions of Ghana. It is situated in the northern part of the country and ranks as the second largest of the sixteen regions. Before its division, it covered an area of 25,000 square kilometres, representing 10 percent of Ghana's area. In December 2018, the Savannah Region and North East Region were created from it. The Northern Region is divided into 16 districts. The region's capital is Tamale, Ghana's third-largest city.

== Geography and climate ==
=== Location and size ===
The Northern Region, spanning approximately 25,000 square kilometres, stands as Ghana's second-largest region by land area. It shares borders with the North East Region and Savannah Region to the north and Oti Region to the south, and neighbouring countries, including the Republic of Togo to the east and La Côte d'Ivoire to the west.

=== Climate and vegetation ===
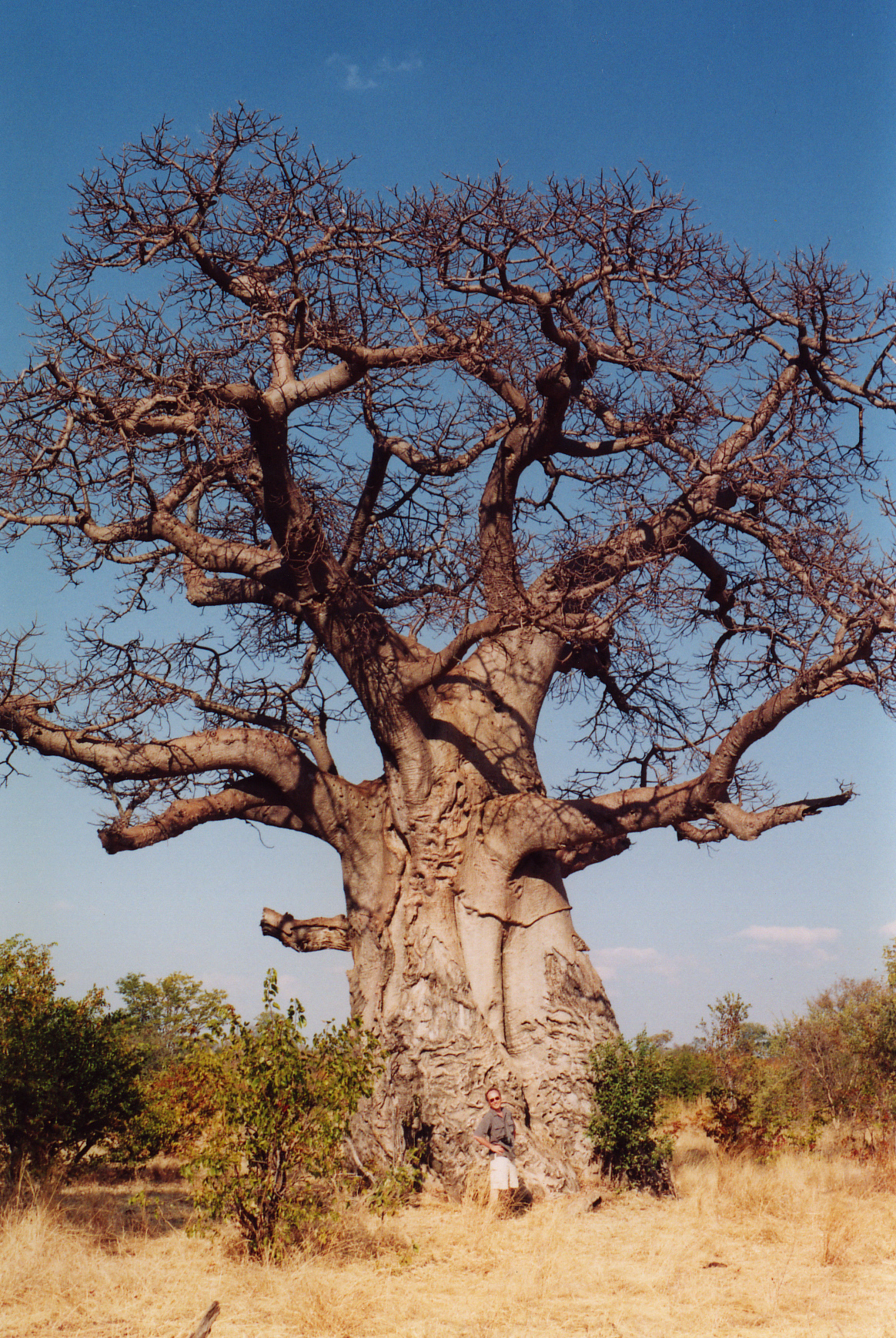
A baobab tree

The Northern Region has a Guinean forest-savanna mosaic ecosystem. The Guinea Savanna is the wettest of the three savanna ecological zones. The vegetation consists predominantly of woodlands and grasslands. The wet season is between April and October, while the dry season occurs from January to March. There is an average annual rainfall of 750 to 1050 mm (30 to 40 inches). The highest temperatures are reached in March, at the end of the dry season. From late November to March, the northeast trade winds blow, causing Harmattan. During this time, temperatures can vary between 14 °C (59 °F) at night and 40 °C (104 °F) during the day.

== Economy ==
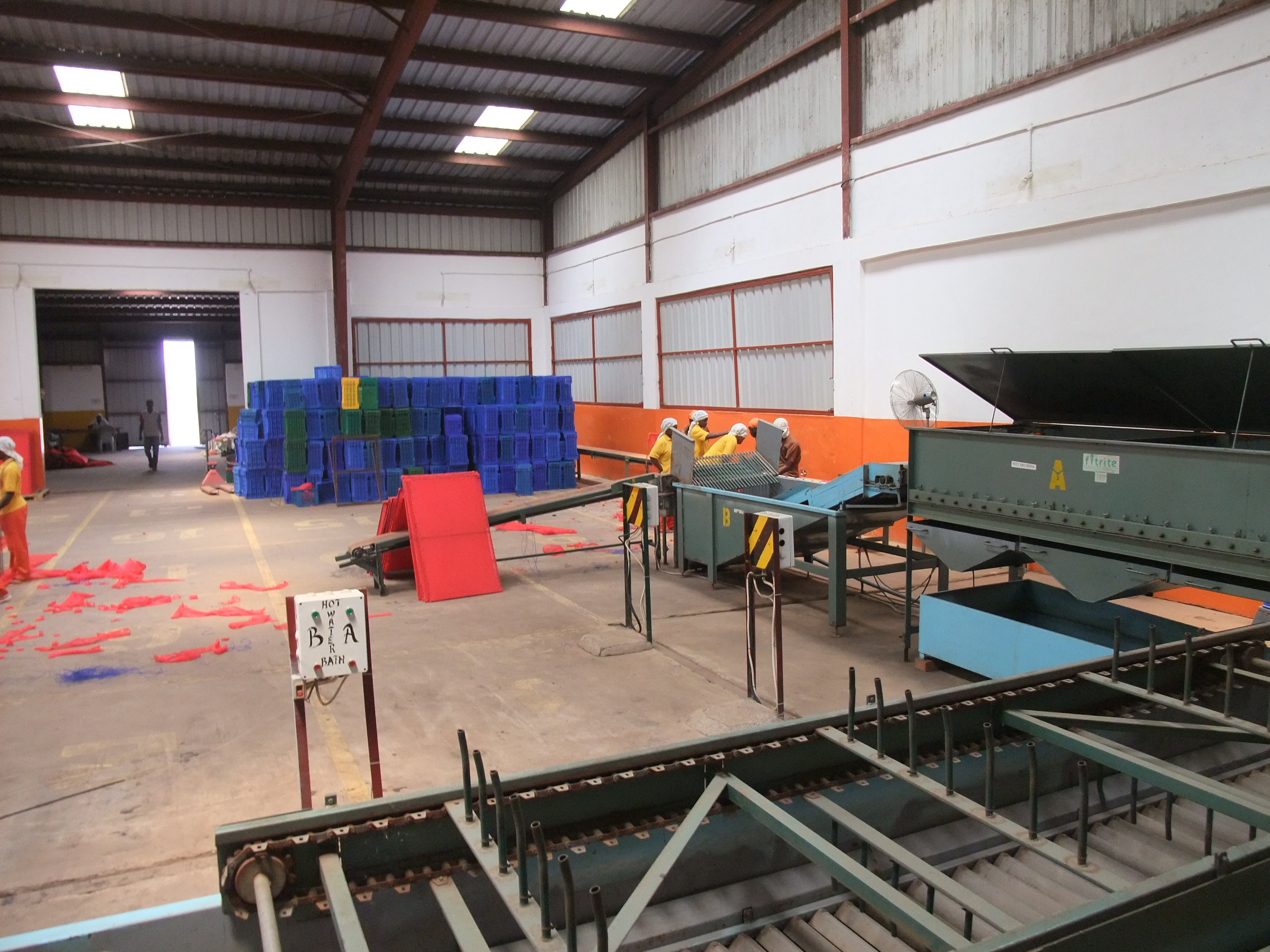
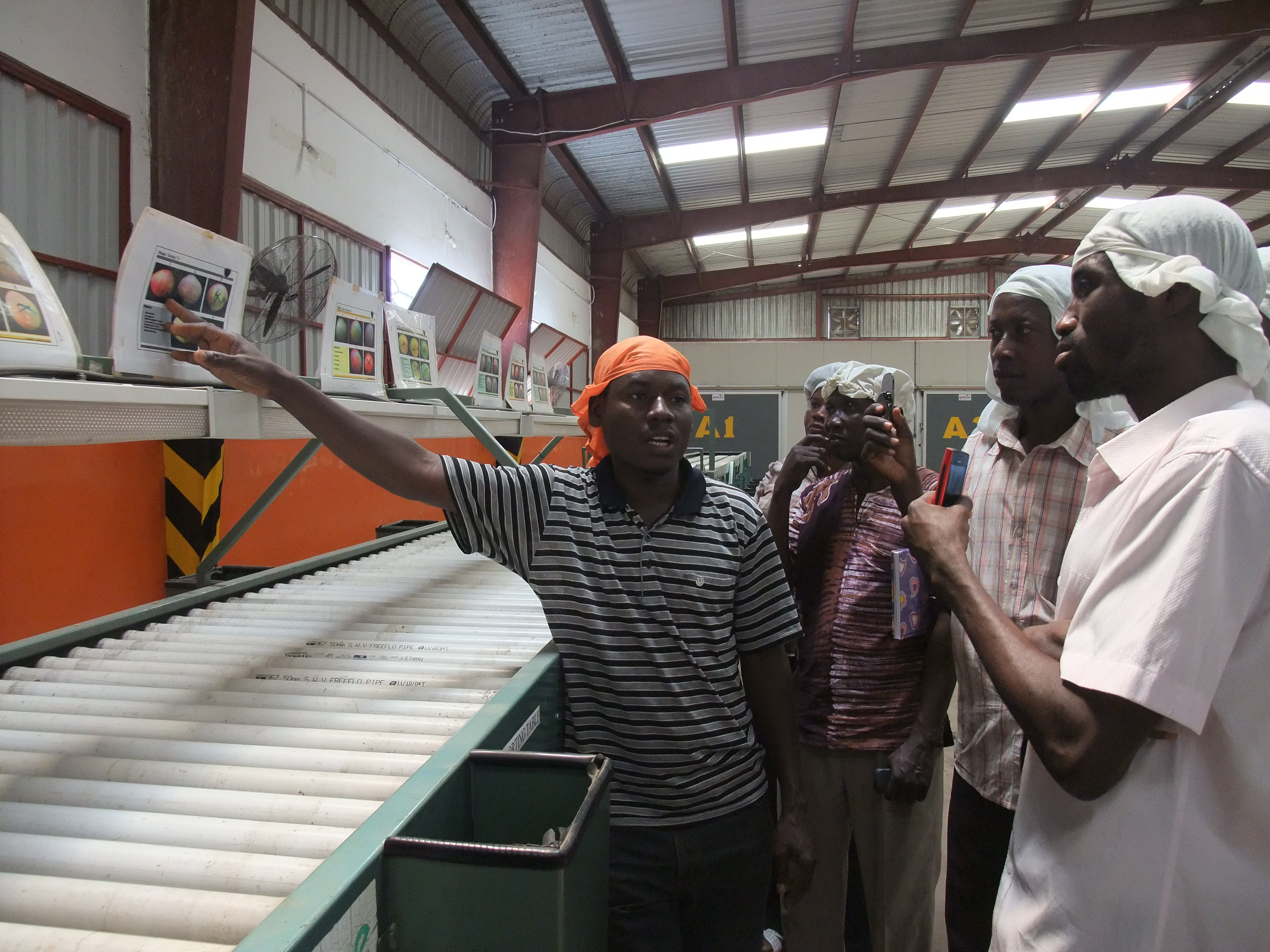
Agribusiness factory in Tamale, Northern Region. Agriculturist workers at Agriculture factory in Tamale, Northern Region.

Like all parts of Ghana, more than half of the economically active population are agricultural. The region is one of the most agriculturally important regions in Ghana. It also has the largest reserve of iron ore.

== Demographics ==
The Northern Region contains much of the territories of the Kingdom of Dagbon, and Dagbani is the most widely spoken language, along with English. Dagbani belongs to the Oti–Volta subfamily in the Niger–Congo language family. Other languages spoken within the region include Likpakpaln and Nawuri.

== Business ==
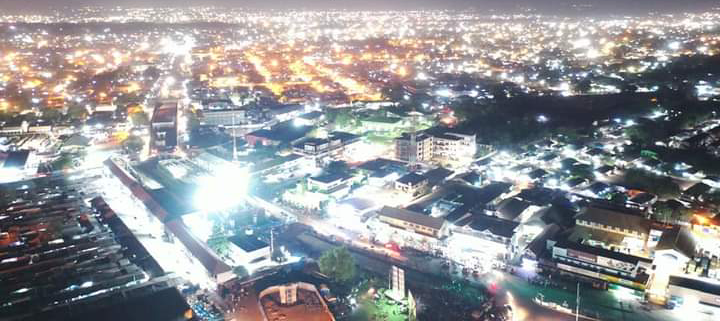
Night view of the city of Tamale, Ghana.

The region is a hotspot for investment in Ghana, with Tamale previously being ranked as the fastest-growing city in West Africa, experiencing tremendous growth compared to other cities in Ghana. The region's location and greater proximity to both Europe and North Africa, compared to Accra, make it an increasingly attractive destination for investors. Ghana's largest iron ore reserves, estimated to be more than three billion tons, make the region an ideal destination for investments in steel and iron.

== Tourism ==
- Naa Gbewaa Palace, Yendi
- Hamamat Shea Butter Village
- Tamale Center for Culture and Arts
- Savanna Centre for Contemporary Art
- Red Clay Studios
- Nkrumah Volini
- Nuku Studios
- Saakpuli Slave wells
- Diarre Napagaduungbanani
- Naa Binbegu Boabab Tree, Yendi
- Buntaga Irrigation Dam
- Sabali (River Oti)
- Nawuni River (White Volta)
- Deutsch Cemetery at Yendi
- Adibo dalila war zones, Adibo

=== Religion ===
Around three out of five residents in the Northern region were affiliated with Islam (60.0%).

== Districts ==
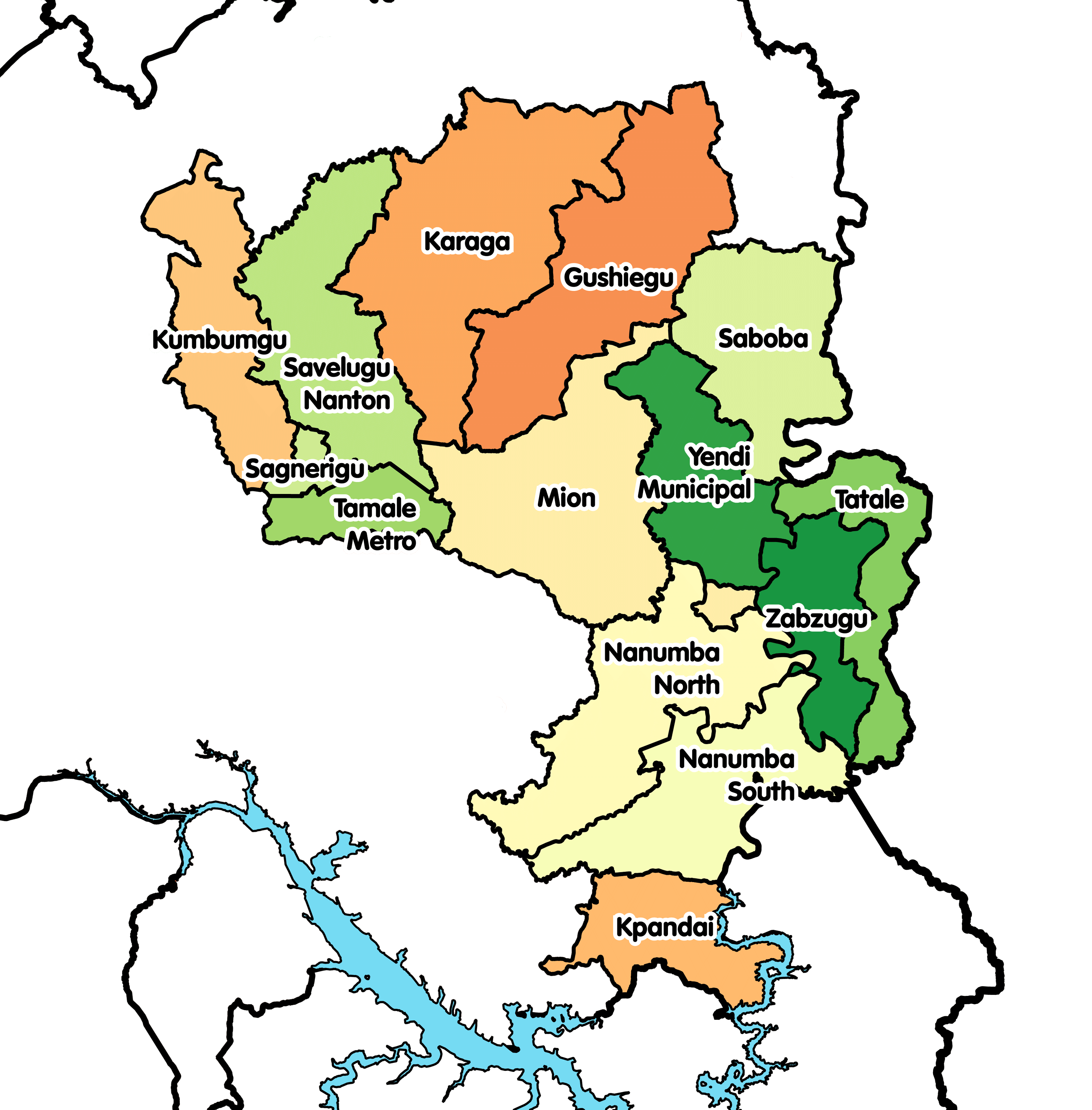
Districts of the Northern Region

The Northern Region of Ghana contains 16 districts. 11 are ordinary districts in addition to 1 metropolitan and 4 municipal districts. Under every municipality, metropolis and district are many towns and villages.

Districts in Northern region
#	District	Capital	Population
1	Gushegu	Gushegu	
2	Karaga	Karaga	
3	Kpandai	Kpandai	108,816
4	Kumbungu	Kumbungu	
5	Mion	Sang	
6	Nanton	Nanton	
7	Nanumba North	Bimbilla	
8	Nanumba South	Wulensi	
9	Saboba	Saboba	
10	Sagnarigu	Sagnerigu	
11	Savelugu	Savelugu	
12	Tamale Metropolitan	Tamale	
13	Tatale Sangule	Tatale	
14	Tolon	Tolon	
15	Yendi Municipal District	Yendi	
16	Zabzugu	Zabzugu	

== Health facilities ==
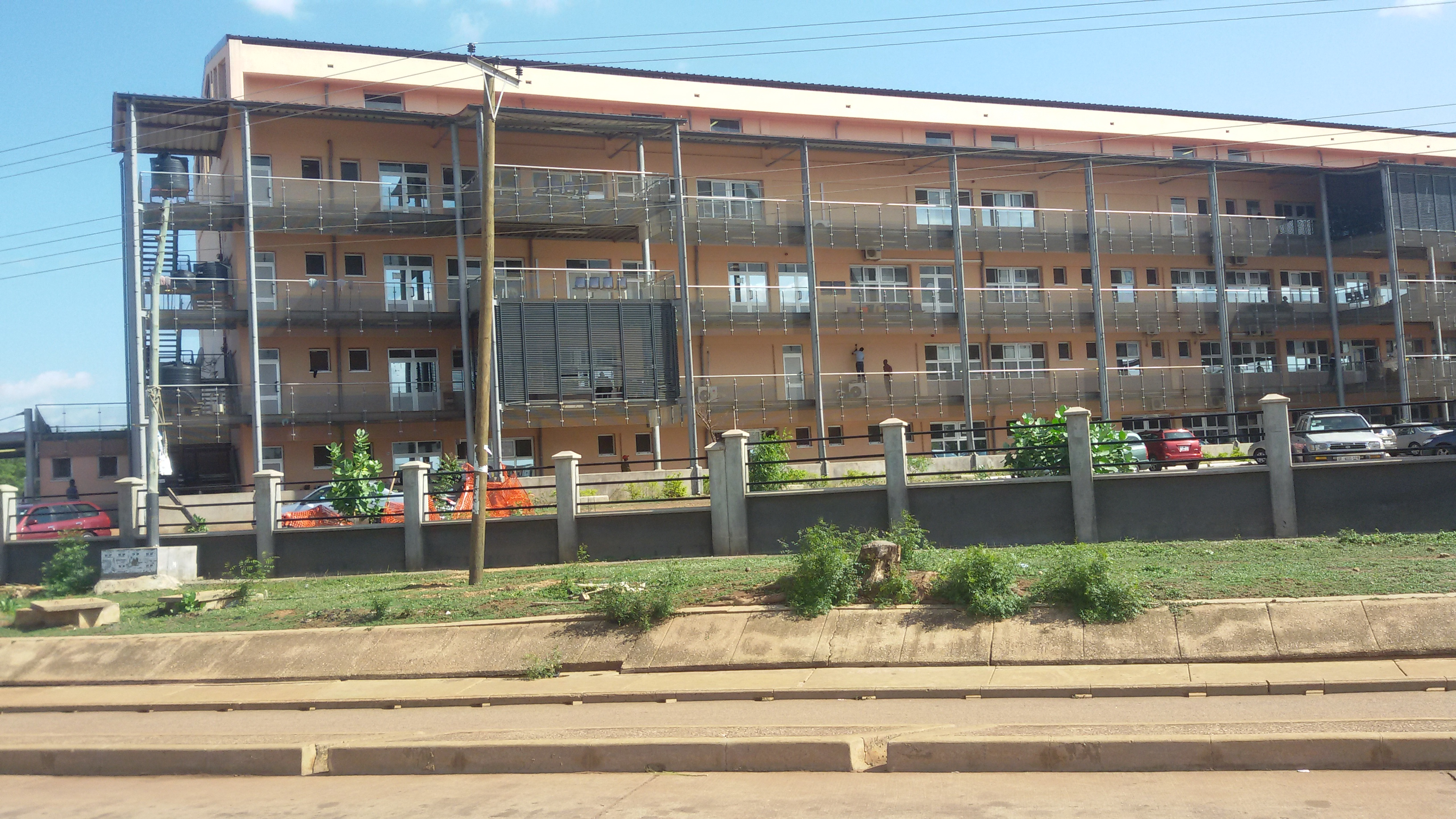
Tamale Teaching Hospital, Ghana's third largest hospital.

Hospitals in the Northern Region:

- Tamale Teaching Hospital
- Tamale Central West Hospital
- Tamale West Hospital
- SDA Hospital
- Yendi Municipal Hospital
- Savelugu Municipal Hospital
- Bimbilla District Hospital
- Kumbungu District Hospital
- Gusheigu District Hospital

== Healthcare Delivery ==
High-risk districts in the northern belt have been identified as having significant health insurance coverage gaps driven by localised socioeconomic determinants.

== Notable citizens ==
Some notable native citizens of Northern Region, Dagbon
#	Citizen	Settlement
1	Aliu Mahama	Yendi
2	Wakaso	Tamale
3	Majeed Waris	Tamale
4	Haruna Iddrisu	Tamale
5	Muhammad Mumuni	Kumbungu
6	Ramatu Baba	Yendi
7	Abubakari Sadiq NAM	Yendi
8	Sheikh Ibrahim Basha	Tamale
9	Sheikh Sa-eed Abubakar	Tamale
10	Hajia Samata Gifty Bukari	Yendi
11	Ibrahim Mahama	Tamale

== See also ==
- Kingdom of Dagbon
