= Ras Mubarak =

Ghanaian politician and farmer

Hon. Ras Mubarak
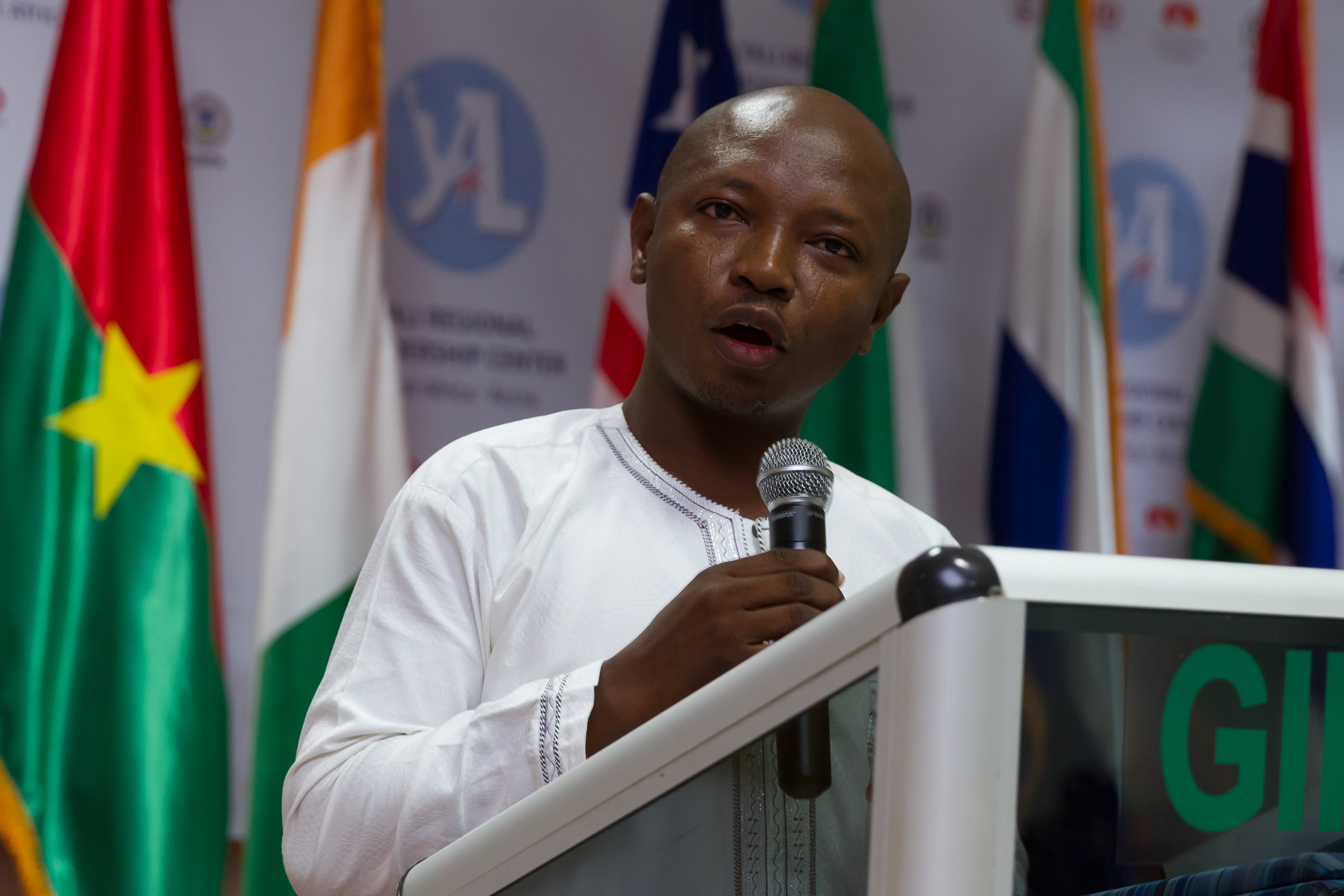
- Ras Mubarak speaking at a YALI event in 2015

Member of Parliament for Kumbungu Constituency
- In office 7 January 2017 – January 2021
- Preceded by: Moses Amadu Yahaya
- Succeeded by: Hamza Adam

Personal details
- Born: Ras Mubarak; 3 June 1979 (age 47) Satani, Kumbungu
- Party: National Democratic Congress
- Education: London School of Journalism; University of Oslo
- Occupation: Journalist

Ras Mubarak (born 3 June 1979) is a Ghanaian journalist, farmer, freelance media publicist, and politician. He belongs to the National Democratic Congress. He was the chief executive officer of the National Youth Authority (Ghana) from 2013 to 2016.

Ras Mubarak used to be a Reggae music Presenter at Ghana Broadcasting Corporation, where he worked both on radio and Television. Ras Mubarak was the member of Parliament for Kumbungu (Ghana Parliament constituency) in the seventh Parliament of the fourth republic of Ghana.

== Early life and education ==
Ras Mubarak was born in Tamale, in the Northern Region of Ghana but hails from Satani, in the Kumbungu district where his great-grandfather was the Paramount Chief.

He holds a Diploma in Journalism from the London School of Journalism in the year 2009 and Post Graduate Diploma(NIBS) in International Development Studies from the University of Oslo Norway in the year 2010, and a Post Graduate Certificate in Business Administration from the Nobel International Business School in Accra.

== Political career ==
Ras Mubarak contested for the National Democratic Congress (Ghana) parliamentary nomination for Ablekuma North in 2011. He won the nomination and subsequently represented the party in the 2012 general election as their Member of Parliament candidate. However, he lost the election to the New Patriotic Party Candidate. He then proceeded to contest for the NDC Parliamentary slot in Kumbungu in 2015. He again won and contested for the Member of Parliament of Kumbungu (Ghana parliament constituency) in the Northern Region of Ghana for the 2016 Ghanaian general Election. He won the parliamentary seat of Kumbungu constituency in the Northern Region of Ghana with 18, 777 votes of the total votes representing 55. 03%. He won the election over Amadu Moses Yahaya of Convention people's party who polled 8, 405 votes which is equivalent to 24. 63%, parliamentary candidate for New Patriotic Party Iddrisu Mutaru had 5, 196 votes representing 15. 23%, Abukari Abdul Fatawu of PPP had 1, 623 votes representing 4. 76% and parliamentary candidate for APC Mohammed Mutaru Sulemana polled 121 votes representing 0. 35% of the total votes.

Ras Mubarak contested for the 2019 National Democratic Congress primaries but lost the election to Hamza Adam. In May 2023, Mubarak made another attempt to represent his Party as its Parliamentary candidate for election 2024. He lost again to incumbent Hamza Adam.

== Personal life ==
Ras Mubarak is a Muslim. He has been married three times.
