= Kumbungu (Ghana parliament constituency) =

Ghana parliament constituency

- constituency for the Parliament of Ghana
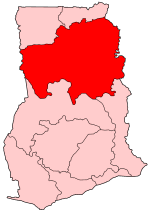
- District: Tolon/Kumbungu District
- Region: Northern Region of Ghana

Current constituency
- Party: National Democratic Congress
- MP: Hamza Adam

Kumbungu is one of the constituencies represented in the Parliament of Ghana. It elects one member of parliament (MP) by the first-past-the-post system of election. Kumbungu is located in the Northern Region of Ghana. The current member of Parliament for the constituency is Hamza Adam. He won the 2020 Ghanaian general election. Hon. Hamza was re-elected as a member of parliament for the constituency.

== Members of Parliament ==
First elected	Member	Party
Created 1992
1992	Alhassan Musah	National Democratic Congress
1996	Muhammed Mumuni	National Democratic Congress
2000	Muhammed Mumuni	National Democratic Congress
2004	Imoro Yakubu Kakpagu	National Democratic Congress
2012	Muhammed Mumuni	National Democratic Congress
2013	Moses Amadu Yahaya	Convention People's Party
2016	Ras Mubarak	National Democratic Congress
2020	Hamza Adam	National Democratic Congress
2024	Hamza Adam	National Democratic Congress

== Elections ==
The table below shows the parliamentary election results for Kumbungu constituency during the 1996 Ghanaian general election.

1996 Ghanaian general election: Kumbungu Source:Ghana Home Page
Party	Candidate	Votes	%	±%
National Democratic Congress	Muhammed Mumuni	13,495	48.60	—
Convention People's Party	Saeed Ahmed Abdallah	7,498	27.00	—
NCP	Iddrisu Huseini	517	1.90	—
Majority		13,495	48.60	—

The following table shows the parliamentary election results for Kumbungu constituency in the 2000 Ghanaian general election.

2000 Ghanaian parliamentary election: Kumbungu Source:Ghana Home Page
Party	Candidate	Votes	%	±%
National Democratic Congress	Muhammed Mumuni	12,477	60.40	—
New Patriotic Party	Alidu Binda Talhat	3,699	17.90	—
Convention People's Party	Iddrisu Iddi	3,555	17.20	—
UGM	Issahaku Huzeru	456	2.20	—
People's National Convention	Umar M. Hashim	339	1.60	—
NRP	Dawuda Ibrahim	127	0.60	—
Majority		12,477	60.40	—

The below table shows the parliamentary election results for Kumbungu constituency during the 2004 Ghanaian general election.

2004 Ghanaian general election: Kumbungu Source:Ghana Home Page
Party	Candidate	Votes	%	±%
National Democratic Congress	Imoro Yakubu Kakpagu	22,245	77.50	—
New Patriotic Party	Prince Imoro Alhassan Andani	5,968	20.80	—
Convention People's Party	Mohammed Imoro	498	1.70	—
Majority		22,245	77.50	—

The following table shows the parliamentary election results for Kumbungu constituency in the 2008 Ghanaian general election.

2008 Ghanaian general election: Kumbungu Source:Ghana Home Page
Party	Candidate	Votes	%	±%
National Democratic Congress	Imoro Yakubu Kakpagu	18,155	67.83	—
New Patriotic Party	Alidu Binda Talhat	6,096	22.78	—
Convention People's Party	Peter Ibrahim Neidow	2,515	9.40	—
Majority		18,155	67.83	—

=== 2012 Ghanaian general election ===
This table shows the results of 2012 Ghanaian general election for Kumbungu constituency.

2012 Ghanaian general election: Kumbungu
Party	Candidate	Votes	%	±%
National Democratic Congress	Muhammad Mumuni	18,285	56.57%	
New Patriotic Party	Abdulai Mohammed Saani	8,523	26.37%	
Convention People's Party	Moses Amadu Yahaya	4,134	12.79%	
Progressive People's Party	Alhassan Abukari	1,146	3.55%	
NDP	Imoro Issahaku	236	0.73%	

==== 2013 By-Election ====
By-election was organized by electoral commission on Tuesday, 30 April 2013 to hold in the Kumbungu constituency in the Kumbungu district of the Northern Region when the member of Parliament for the constituency Muhammad Mumuni was appointed as Secretary-General of African, Caribbean and Pacific States. In line with Article 112(5) of the constitution as amended by section 3 of Act 527, he has no option than abdicating his seat. Convention people's party candidate Moses Amadu Yahaya won this by-election. This was the first time different political party won the seat other than National Democratic Congress since the constituency was created.

2016 Ghanaian general election: Kumbungu
Party	Candidate	Votes	%	±%
National Democratic Congress	Ras Mubarak	18,777	55.03%	
Convention People's Party	Moses Amadu Yahaya	8,405	24.63%	
New Patriotic Party	Iddrisu Mutaru	5,196	15.23%	
Progressive People's Party	Abukari Abdul Gatawu	1,623	4.76%	
All People's Congress	Mohammed Mutaru Sulemana	121	0.35%	
Majority		10,372	30.4%	
Turnout				

==== 2020 Ghanaian general election ====
The table below is the results of the 2020 Ghanaian general election for Kumbungu constituency which was held on 7 December 2020.

2020 Ghanaian general election: Kumbungu
Party	Candidate	Votes	%	±%
National Democratic Congress	Hamza Adam	22,961	54.60%	
New Patriotic Party	Abdul-Salam Hamza Fataw	17,144	40.77%	
IND	Abukari Abdul Fataw	1,154	2.78%	
CPP	Nabila Alhassan Basiru	795	1.89%	

===== 2024 Ghanaian general election =====
The following table shows the results of the 2024 Ghanaian general election for Kumbungu constituency which was held on 7 December 2024.

2024 Ghanaian general election: Kumbungu
Party	Candidate	Votes	%	±%
National Democratic Congress	Hamza Adam	27,242	58.66%	
New Patriotic Party	Abdul-Salam Hamza Fataw	19,198	41.34%	

== See also ==
- Satani
- List of Ghana Parliament constituencies
- List of political parties in Ghana
