= Imoro Yakubu Kakpagu =

Ghanaian politician

Hon. Imoro Yakubu Kakpagu

Member of the Ghana Parliament for Kumbungu
- In office Jan 2009 – Jan 2013
- Preceded by: Mohammed Mumuni
- Succeeded by: Mohammed Mumuni
- President: John Atta Mills
- President: John Dramani Mahama

Personal details
- Born: February 1958 (age 68) Ghana
- Party: NDC
- Relations: Married
- Children: Seven
- Education: GIMPA
- Occupation: Ministry of Local Government
- Profession: Public Servant

Imoro Yakubu Kakpagu (born February 1958) is a Ghanaian politician and a former member of the Parliament of Ghana for the Kumbungu constituency in the Northern Region of Ghana from 2005 to 2013. He is a member of the National Democratic Congress.

== Early life and education ==
Kakpagu was born in Kumbungu in the Northern Region of Ghana in February 1958. He obtained his Local Government Certificate from the Institute of Local Government Studies. After his studies he was employed at the Ministry of Local Government as a Revenue Inspector. In 2008 he graduated from the Ghana Institute of Management and Public Administration with a Bachelor of Public Administration degree.

== Political career ==
In 2004, Kakpagu entered into politics when he contested the Kumbungu parliamentary seat.

=== 2004 elections ===
All those who stood for elections that year were new faces because the incumbent MP Muhammad Mumuni had been chosen as the running mate of the NDC presidential candidate, John Atta Mills. Kakpagu competed with two other candidates namely, Prince Imoro Alhassan Andani of the New Patriotic Party (NPP) and Mohammed Imoro of the Convention People's Party (CPP). He won the election with 22,245 votes which represented 77.50% of the total votes cast. His closest rival was the NPP candidate who got 5,968 votes which represented 20.80% of the total votes cast. The CPP candidate came third with 498 votes representing 1.70%.

=== 2008 elections ===
In 2008 there was no constituency primary as the opposition NDC decided that Kakpagu contest the election on the party's ticket unopposed. He went on to retain his seat after he had been challenged by two candidates Alidu Binda Talhat of the NPP and Peter Ibrahim Neidow of the CPP. The incumbent won with 18,155 votes which represented 67.83% of the total votes cast. The NPP candidate got 6,096 votes which represented 22.78% and the CPP candidate got 2,515 votes which represented 9.40% of the total votes.

=== 2012 parliamentary primaries ===
In the 2012 presidential and parliamentary elections, former MP Muhammed Mumuni, returned to contest the seat. He defeated the sitting MP, Kakpagu in the constituency primary election. Muhammad Mumuni, who was then the Foreign Minister, got 161 votes while the incumbent had 133 votes. Muhammad Mumuni won the constituency parliamentary election with 18,285 votes (56.57%). He defeated four candidates: Abdulai Mohammed Saani of the NPP, Amadu Moses Yahaya of the CPP, Alhassan Abukari of the Progressive People's Party, and Imoro Issahaku of the National Democratic Party.

=== 2013 constituency primary by-elections ===
In April 2013, he contested the constituency seat after Muhammad Mumuni vacated it to take up an international appointment. This was after he had contested and won the constituency's parliamentary primary elections against four other candidates. The primaries were held on 14 April 2013 at temporal Kumbungu district assembly yard. Hon. Kakpagu got 170 votes out of a total of 289 valid votes cast. His closest competitor, Dr Jacob Yakubu, pulling 84 votes.

=== 2013 by-elections ===
The opposition New Patriotic Party did not partake in the by-elections because of the petition that the leadership of the party had filed at the Supreme Court regarding results of the 2012 Elections. Kakpagu lost the election to Moses Amadu Yahaya of the Convention Peoples' Party. His loss meant that the two terms he served as MP for the Kumbungu Constituency was sandwiched between MP terms for Muhammed Mumuni.
