= Umar Abdul-Razak =

Ghanaian politician

Umar Abdul Razark

Member of Ghanaian Parliament for Tolon Constituency
- Preceded by: Alhaji Abdulai Salifu
- Succeeded by: Wahab Wumbei Suhuyini
- In office 7 January 2005 – 6 January 2013

Personal details
- Born: 1 October 1975 (age 50) Lungbunga, Northern Region Ghana)
- Party: National Democratic Congress
- Children: 2
- Education: University for Development Studies
- Occupation: Politician
- Profession: Agriculturalist

Umar Abdul Razak (born 1 October 1975) is a Ghanaian agriculturist and a former tutor at Tolon Senior High school. He was also a member of parliament for the Tolon constituency of the Northern Region of Ghana.

== Early life and education ==
Abdul-Razak was born on October 1, 1975. He hails from Lungbunga in the Northern region of Ghana.He obtained a Bachelor of Science Degree in Renewable from the University for development studies.

== Politics ==
He is a member of the National Democratic Congress. He was a member of the Fifth Parliament of the Fourth Republic of Ghana as a representative of the National Democratic Congress. His political career began when he contested in the 2004 Ghanaian general election and obtained a total of 19, 123 votes thereby retaining the seat for the National Democratic Congress. He contested for his seat again in the 2008 Ghanaian general election and won with a total of 17,356 votes making a total percentage of 50.02. He lost in the 2012 Ghanaian general election to a candidate of the New Patriotic Party, Wahab Suhiyinu Wumbei.

== Personal life ==
Razak belongs to the Islamic Religion (Muslim) and is married with two children.
