= Moses Amadu Yahaya =

Ghanaian politician

Hon. Moses Amadu Yahaya

Member of the Ghana Parliament for Kumbungu
- In office April 2013 – January 2017
- Preceded by: Mohammed Mumuni
- Succeeded by: Ras Mubarak

Personal details
- Born: 1952 (age 73–74) Ghana
- Party: Convention Peoples' Party
- Occupation: Community Development Worker
- Profession: Building Technician

Moses Amadu Yahaya is a Ghanaian building technician, politician and was a Member of Parliament for the Kumbungu constituency in the Northern Region of Ghana. He is a member of the Convention Peoples' Party.

== Professional life ==
Yahaya worked as a development worker for the Tolon-Kumbungu District of the Northern Region. From 1996 to 2006 he worked with the international NGO Ghanaian Danish Community Programme as a development officer. After his contract with the Danish International Development Agency (DANIDA) ended, he worked with Kings Village, another international NGO which helped in the areas of community education and health. He worked to improve the quality of life of the people in the district till he appointed acting country Director of the NGO until his election as MP. He is currently the Eastern Regional Manager for National Food Buffer Stock Company (NAFCO) (2017–present).

== Development activities ==
Moses Yahaya's relationships with the British Army with assistance from the UK based organization 58AI aided him to drill 67 boreholes for 32 communities in the Tolon-Kumbungu District. He lobbied for 136 boreholes for the 116 communities in the Kumbungu area and connected 7 communities with pipe borne water. He secured loans for women groups to help them to develop self-help financial activities.

== Political life ==
While he was working with The King's Village, Ghana, Yahaya developed an interest in politics. He served as the assemblyman for Saakuba Electoral Area one of the communities in the Kumbungu constituency.

=== 2012 election ===
During the 2012 presidential and parliamentary elections, Yahaya stood on the ticket of the Convention Peoples' Party and contested the seat with four other candidates namely Muhammad Mumuni of the National Democratic Congress, Abdulai Mohammed Saani of the New Patriotic Party, Alhassan Abukari of the Progressive People's Party and Imoro Issahaku of the National Democratic Party. Muhammad Mumuni won the elections with a majority of 18,285 votes, while Yahaya got 4,134 of the total votes cast representing 12.79%.

=== 2013 by-election ===
In 2013, the Electoral Commission announced that it would hold a by-election in Kumbungu to fill the vacant parliamentary seat. The seat became vacant after the incumbent MP, Muhammad Mumuni, was appointed the secretary-general of the Economic Community of West African States (ECOWAS) and African Caribbean Pacific countries to complete the tenure of Dr. Mohammed Ibn Chambas. Yahaya competed against two other candidates, Imoro Yakubu Kakpagu of the NDC and Ahmed Nasiru Mohammed of the Progressive People's Party (PPP). Yahaya got 13,029 votes representing 51.80% of the total votes cast. He thus becomes the only Convention People's Party Member of Parliament for the term 2013 to 2017.
