= Alhaji Abdulai Salifu =

Ghanaian politician

Hon. Alhaji Abdulai Salifu

Member of Parliament for Tolon Constituency
- In office 7 January 2001 – 6 January 2005
- President: John Kufuor
- Succeeded by: Umar Abdul-Razak

Member of Parliament for Tolon Constituency
- In office 7 January 1993 – 6 January 2001
- President: Jerry John Rawlings

Personal details
- Born: 19 June 1943 (age 83) Tolon, Gold Coast
- Party: National Democratic Congress
- Education: University of Ghana
- Occupation: Teacher
- Profession: Politician

Alhaji Abdulai Salifu is a Ghanaian politician and was the member of parliament for the Tolon constituency in the Northern region of Ghana. He was a member of parliament in the 1st, 2nd and 3rd parliament of the 4th republic of Ghana.

== Early life and education ==
Salifu was born on June 19, 1943, at Tolon in the Northern Region of Ghana. He attended the University of Ghana and Studied Geography and Political Science and obtained a degree in Bachelor of Arts. He attended the Presby Training College and obtained his Teacher Training Certificate.

== Career ==
Salifu is a Political Teacher and a former member of Parliament for the Tolon Constituency in the Northern Region of Ghana.

== Politics ==
Salifu is a member of the National Democratic Congress. He was first elected into parliament during the 1992 Ghanaian parliamentary election as a member of the First Parliament of the Fourth Republic of Ghana and re-elected in 1996 Ghanaian General Elections as member of the Second Parliament of the Fourth Republic of Ghana, he was sworn into parliament on 7 January 1997.

He defeated Alhassan Abukari Baako of the New Patriotic Party by obtaining 14,545 votes which represented 45.00% of the total votes cast whilst his counterpart obtained 32.40% for Alhassan Abukari Baako of New Patriotic Party and 1.50% for Mohammed Zakaria Nabila of Convention People's Party (CPP).

Salifu was again elected as the member of parliament for the Tolon constituency in the 2000 Ghanaian general elections. He was elected on the ticket of the National Democratic Congress. His constituency was a part of the 18 parliamentary seats out of 23 seats won by the National Democratic Congress in that election for the Northern Region.

The National Democratic Congress won a minority total of 92 parliamentary seats out of 200 seats in the 3rd parliament of the 4th republic of Ghana. He was elected with 11,740 votes out of 24,690 total valid votes cast. This was equivalent to 49.3% of the total valid votes cast.

He was elected over Alhassan A. Baako of the New Patriotic Party, Samson Hussein Salifu of the Convention People's Party, Mohammadu N. Togmah of the People's National Convention and Adam Alhassan of the United Ghana Movement.

These obtained 8,701, 2,751, 420 and 208 votes respectively out of the total valid votes cast. These were equivalent to 36.5%, 11.5%, 1.8% and 0.9% respectively of total valid votes cast.

He was succeeded by Umar Abdul-Razak who won in the 2004 Ghanaian General elections.

=== Ambassadorial role ===
In 2009, Salifu was appointed by President John Evans Atta Mills as Ghana's Ambassador to Saudi Arabia.

== Personal life ==
Salifu belongs to the Islamic Religion(Muslim).
