= Habib Iddrisu =

Ghanaian politician

Hon. Habib Iddrisu MP
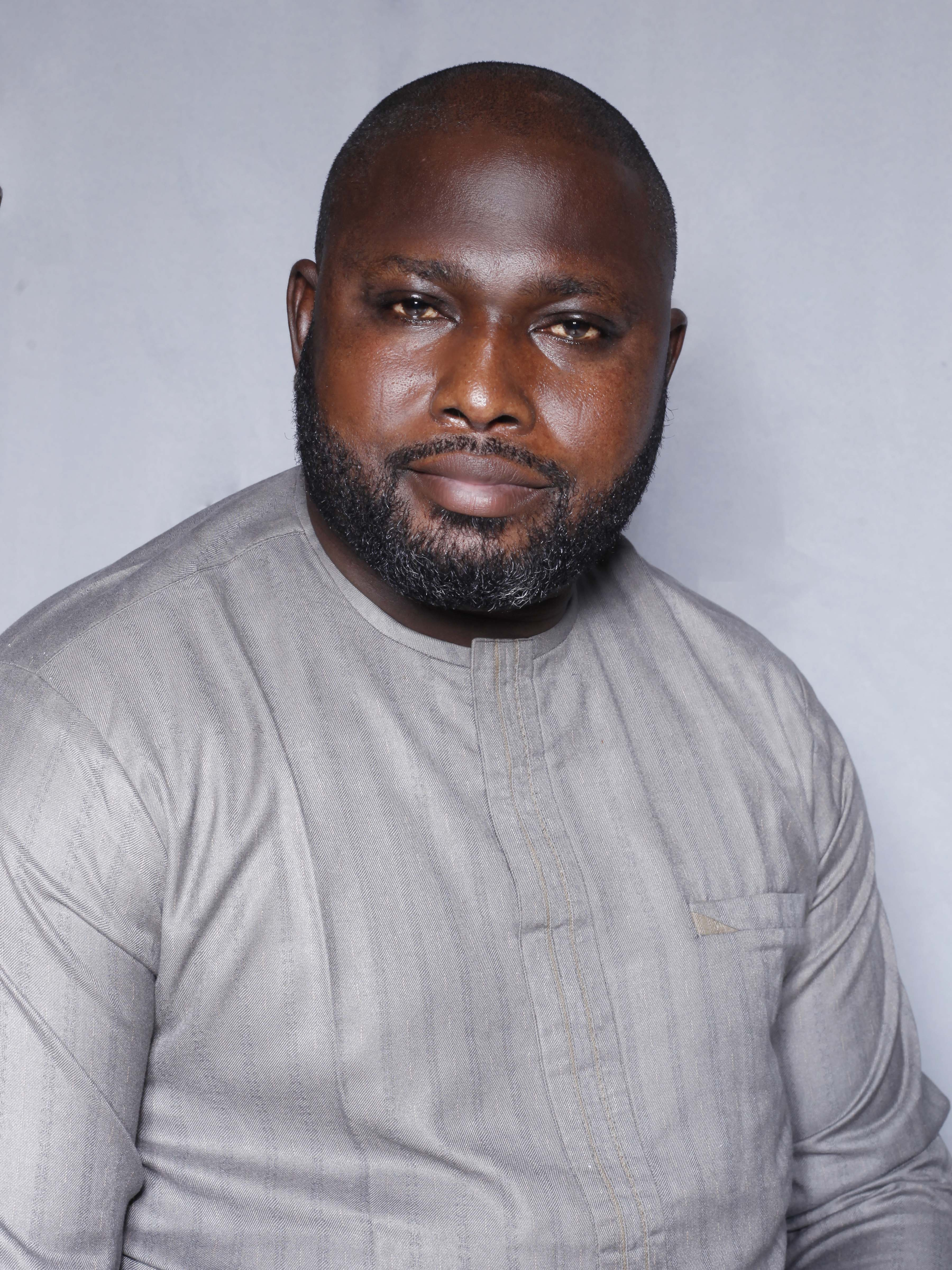

Member of Parliament Elect for Tolon Constituency
- Incumbent
- Assumed office 7 January 2021

Personal details
- Party: New Patriotic Party

Habib Iddrisu is a Ghanaian politician who is a member of the New Patriotic Party (NPP). He is the member of parliament for the Tolon Constituency in the Northern Region of Ghana.

== Early Life and Educational Career ==
Habib Iddrisu had his Basic Education Certificate Examination (BECE) from Sakasaka Junior Secondary School in the year 2000 and with his Senior Secondary School Certificate Examination (SSSCE) from Savelugu Senior High School in the year 2003. He studied Diploma Journalism and Media Studies from Trans African College in 2007 and Diploma in Security Counter from Murdoch University, Australia in the year 2010. He also had a Certificate in Human Resource Management from the University of Notre Dame, Australia and Diploma in Leadership and Management from Cambridge College International, Australia. While at parliament as a member, he proceeds to Ghana Institute of Management and Public Administration (GIMPA) where he attained his Certificate in Law and Governance as well as Certificate in Business Administration in the year 2020.

Iddrisu, before becoming MP, served as the Deputy Executive Secretary of Ghana Free Zones Authority in charge of Tema enclave.

== Politics ==
Habib Iddrisu is a member of New Patriotic Party and represents Tolon (Ghana parliament constituency) in the Eighth Parliament of the Fourth Republic of Ghana. Habib served as the second deputy chief whip for the majority side in parliament. In February 2024, after some changes to the Majority leadership, Habib was elevated to the position of first Deputy Majority Chief Whip.

In September 2021, President Nana Addo Dankwa Akufo-Addo appointed Habib and eight others to the Board of the Agriculture Development Bank. He is also a member of the Ghana National Hajj Board, a body responsible for overseeing the organization of the annual pilgrimage to Mecca. In July 2024, Habib and five others were sworn-in as Board of Directors of Electricity Company of Ghana.

=== 2016 election ===
In the 2016 Ghanaian general election, Iddrisu stood for the Sagnarigu Constituency against the member of parliament Alhassan Bashir Fuseini of the National Democratic Congress and lost with 7,888 votes representing 20.7% against Fuseini's 26,898 votes representing 70.7%.

Ahead of the 2020 elections, Iddrisu entered the race for the parliamentary candidate in the NPP primaries, this time around in the Tolon Constituency. In June 2020, he won the primaries for the Tolon Constituency after defeating incumbent member of parliament Wahab Wumbei Suhuyini who had served as member of parliament for two terms and been in parliament since January 2013. He won by getting 338 votes, while the incumbent had 164 votes and the rest of the three candidates had a total of 32 votes.

==== 2020 Ghanaian General Election ====
Iddrisu was elected member of parliament for Tolon constituency during the 2020 Ghanaian general elections. He was declared winner in the parliamentary elections after obtaining 31,429 votes representing 58.37% against his closest contender Yussif Adam of the National Democratic Congress who had 22,145 votes representing 41.13%.

===== 2024 Ghanaian General Election =====
Hon. Iddrisu was re-elected as a member of parliament for Tolon constituency during the 2024 Ghanaian general election with 30,893 votes which represent 55.50% of the total votes. He was elected over the parliamentary candidate for National Democratic Congress Osman Tahidu Damba and Sumani Dawuda Wumbei of APC. They obtained 24,772 votes and 0 votes which is equivalent to 44.50% and 0.00% respectful.

== Constituency Development & Pro ==
Hon. Habib Iddrisu has actively supported education in Tolon through his Soyalana Educational and Endowment Fund:

- Financial support to students: He has helped over 2,000 students from the Tolon Constituency through the education fund, covering tuition and educational needs for both senior high and tertiary students .
- GH¢320,000 Disbursement: In September 2025, he donated GH¢320,000 to 229 students to support their ed
- GH¢600,000 Fees Paid for 500 Tertiary Students: In May 2024, he covered school fees totaling GH¢600,000 for 500 disadvantaged tertiary students through the same fund .

== Electrification Projects ==
Before and after becoming MP, he was involved in electrifying part of the constituency:

- Connected 7 communities to the national grid under the Self Help Electricity Project (SHEP), bringing power to several rural areas in Tolon .
- Boat & Life Jackets Donation: In November 2025, he personally donated an engine boat and life jackets (~GH¢80,000) to the Zantani community to improve transportation safety on local waterways.

== Awards ==
The Northern Business Excellence Awards also recognised him as the Young and Most-Promising Entrepreneur in 2020. The Voiceless Media in 2019 conferred on him the Humanitarian Service Personnel Award. In 2023, Iddrisu received the Most influential personality in the five regions of the north award from Northern Excellence Awards due to his contributions to the development in this regions and the vital roles he played. Abdul Aziz Ayaba Musah and Farouk Aliu Mahama received this award on his behalf.

== Personal life ==
Iddrisu is married and has three children.
