= Jalanpur =

- Village
- Location in West Bengal, India Jalanpur (India)
- Coordinates: 23°30′09″N 87°14′26″E
- Country: India
- State: West Bengal
- District: Bankura
- Subdistrict: Mejhia

Population
  - Total: 1,200 approx
- Time zone: UTC+05:30 (IST)
- ISO 3166 code: IN-WB

Jalanpur is a small village on the bank of the Damodar River in Bankura district, West Bengal, India. This village is just on the other side of Waria Railway station and DTPS. It is under the Banjora Gram Panchayat. It is the last village of Mejia Community development Bloc. This village was once known as the Sanskrit Learning Station.
