= Tolon (Ghana parliament constituency) =

Ghana parliament constituency

- constituency for the Parliament of Ghana
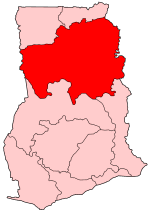
- District: Tolon/Kumbungu District
- Region: Northern Region of Ghana

Current constituency
- Party: New Patriotic Party
- MP: Habib Iddrisu

Tolon is one of the constituencies represented in the Parliament of Ghana. It elects one member of parliament (MP) by the first-past-the-post system of election. Tolon is located in the Northern Region of Ghana. The member of Parliament for the constituency for seventh Parliament of fourth Republic of Ghana was Hon. Wahab Wumbei Suhuyini. He was elected on the ticket of the New Patriotic Party (NPP). The current member of parliament for the constituency is Habib Iddrisu. He was elected on the ticket of New Patriotic Party. Hon Habib Iddrisu was re-elected for the constituency during the 2024 Ghananian general election.

== Members of Parliament ==
Election	Member	Party
1992	Alhaji Abdulai Salifu	National Democratic Congress
1996	Alhaji Abdulai Salifu	National Democratic Congress
2000	Alhaji Abdulai Salifu	National Democratic Congress
2004	Umar Abdul-Razak	National Democratic Congress
2008	Umar Abdul-Razak	National Democratic Congress
2012	Wahab Wumbei Suhuyini	New Patriotic Party
2016	Wahab Wumbei Suhuyini	New Patriotic Party
2020	Habib Iddrisu	New Patriotic Party
2024	Habib Iddrisu	New Patriotic Party

== Elections ==
The following table shows the parliamentary election results for Tolon constituency in the 1992 Ghanaian parliamentary election.

The below table shows the parliamentary election results for Tolon constituency in the 1996 Ghanaian general election.

1996 Ghanaian general election: Tolon Source:Ghana Home Page
Party	Candidate	Votes	%	±%
National Democratic Congress	Alhaji Abdulai Salifu	14,545	45.00	—
New Patriotic Party	Alhassan Abukari Baako	10,462	32.40	—
Convention People's Party	Mohammed Zakaria Nabila	491	1.50	—
Majority		14,545	45.00	—

The following table shows the parliamentary election results for Tolon constituency during the 2000 Ghanaian general election.

2000 Ghanaian parliamentary election: Tolon Source:Ghana Home Page
Party	Candidate	Votes	%	±%
National Democratic Congress	Alhaji Abdulai Salifu	11,740	49.50	—
New Patriotic Party	Alhassan A. Baako	8,701	36.50	—
Convention People's Party	Samson Hussein Salifu	2,751	11.50	—
People's National Convention	Mahammadu Natogmah	420	1.80	—
UGM	Adam Alhassan	208	0.90	—
Majority		11,740	49.50	—

The table below shows the parliamentary election results for Tolon constituency in the 2004 Ghanaian general election.

2004 Ghanaian general election: Tolon Source:Ghana Home Page
Party	Candidate	Votes	%	±%
National Democratic Congress	Umar Abdul-Razak	19,123	59.60	—
New Patriotic Party	Alhaji Iddrisu Adam	12,359	38.58	—
Convention People's Party	Salifu Samsin Hussein	612	1.90	—
Majority		19,123	59.60	—

2008 Ghanaian general election

The table below is the results for 2008 Ghanaian general election.

2008 Ghanaian general election: Tolon
Party	Candidate	Votes	%	±%
National Democratic Congress	Umar Abdul-Razak	17,136	50.02%	
New Patriotic Party	Wahab Wumbei Suhuyini	16,482	48.12%	
PNC	Dokurugu A Sulemana	387	1.13%	
DFP	Sule Zakaria(Appiah)	250	0.73%	

=== 2012 Ghanaian general election ===
2012 Ghanaian general election was held on Friday, 7 December 2012. The table below is the results for Tolon constituency 2012 Ghanaian general election .

2012 Ghanaian general election: Tolon
Party	Candidate	Votes	%	±%
New Patriotic Party	Wahab Wumbei Suhuyini	18,113	48.89%	
National Democratic Congress	Umar Abdul-Razak	15,699	42.37%	
IND	Kass Abdul-Latif Tuahir	2,478	6.69%	
Progressive People's Party	Ziblila Baba Issfu	398	1.07%	
Convention People's Party	Alhassan Adam Damba	361	0.97%	

=== 2016 Ghanaian general election ===
This table shows the results of 2016 Ghanaian general election for Tolon constituency.

2016 Ghanaian general election: Tolon
Party	Candidate	Votes	%	±%
New Patriotic Party	Wahab Wumbei Suhuyini	21,782	50.58%	
National Democratic Congress	Umar Abdul-Razak	20,725	48.12%	
PPP	Ziblila Baba Issfu	304	0.71%	
Convention People's Party	Salifu Samson Hussein	254	0.59%	

==== 2020 Ghanaian general election ====
The table below is the results of the 2020 Ghanaian general election for Tolon constituency which was held on 7 December 2020.

2020 Ghanaian general election: Tolon
Party	Candidate	Votes	%	±%
New Patriotic Party	Habib Iddrisu	31,429	41.13%	
National Democratic Congress	Yussif Adamu	22,145	48.12%	
APC	Sumani Charles Baaba	266	0.49%	

===== 2024 Ghanaian general election =====
The following table shows the results of the 2024 Ghanaian general election for Tolon constituency which was held in 7 December 2024.

2024 Ghanaian general election: Tolon
Party	Candidate	Votes	%	±%
New Patriotic Party	Habib Iddrisu	30,893	55.50%	
National Democratic Congress	Osman Tahidu Damba	24,772	44.50%	
APC	Sumani Dawuda Wumbei	0	0.00%	

== See also ==
- List of Ghana Parliament constituencies
