= Buntaanga =

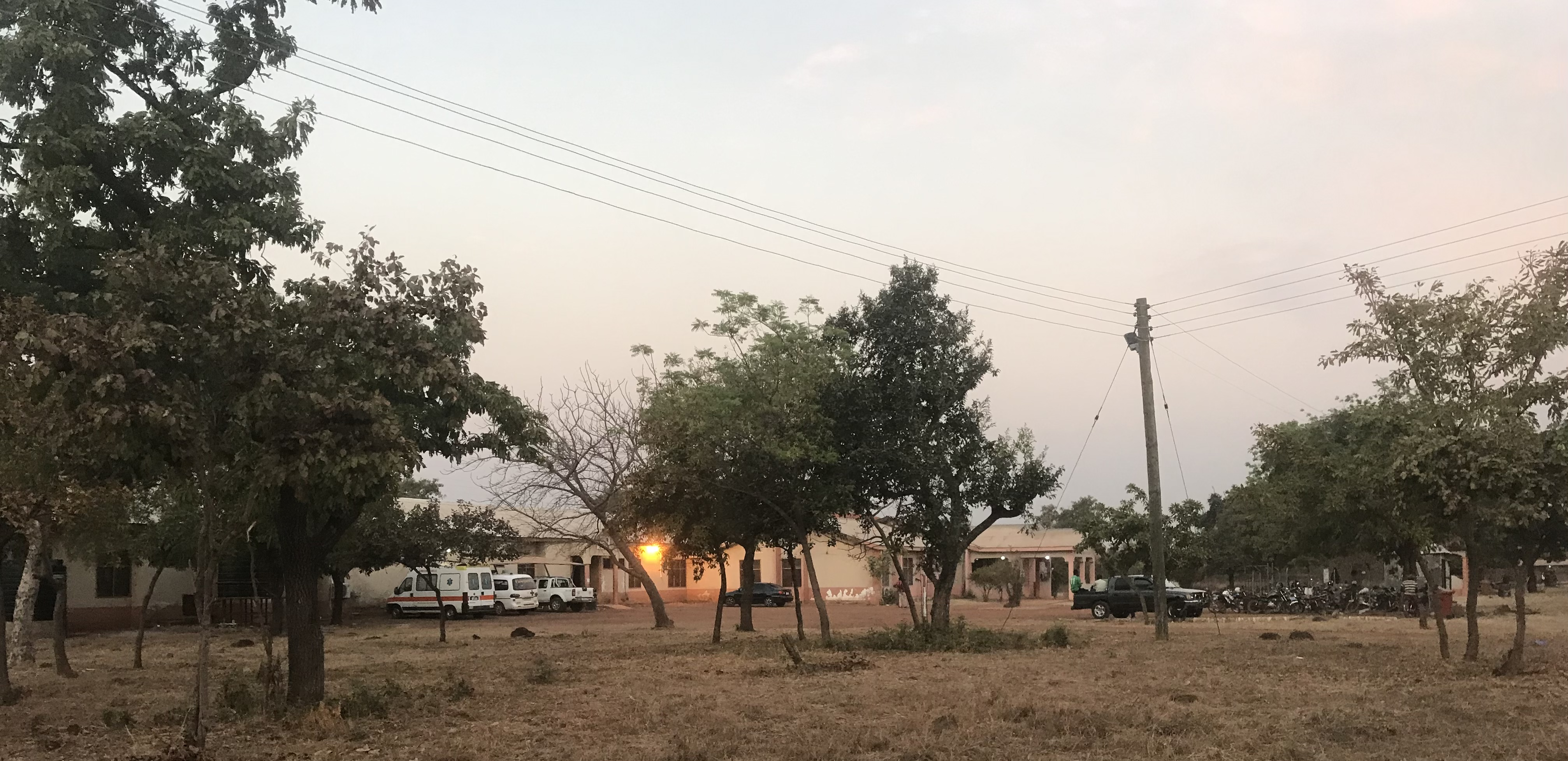
Health facility at Buntaanga.

Buntaanga is a community located in the Kumbungu District of the Northern Region of Ghana. It is host to the Buntaanga Irrigation Dam where significant crop farming and fishing activities are undertaken.
