= Zangbalun =

Coordinates: 9°33′58″N 0°58′05″W

Zangbalun is a community and also and electoral area within Kumbungu District in the northern region of Ghana.
