= Ginjani =

Community in Ghana

Coordinates: 9°30′54″N 0°59′58″W

Ginjani is a community in Kumbungu District in the Northern Region of Ghana.

== See also ==
- Populated places in Kumbungu District
