= Attah Issah =

Ghanaian politician

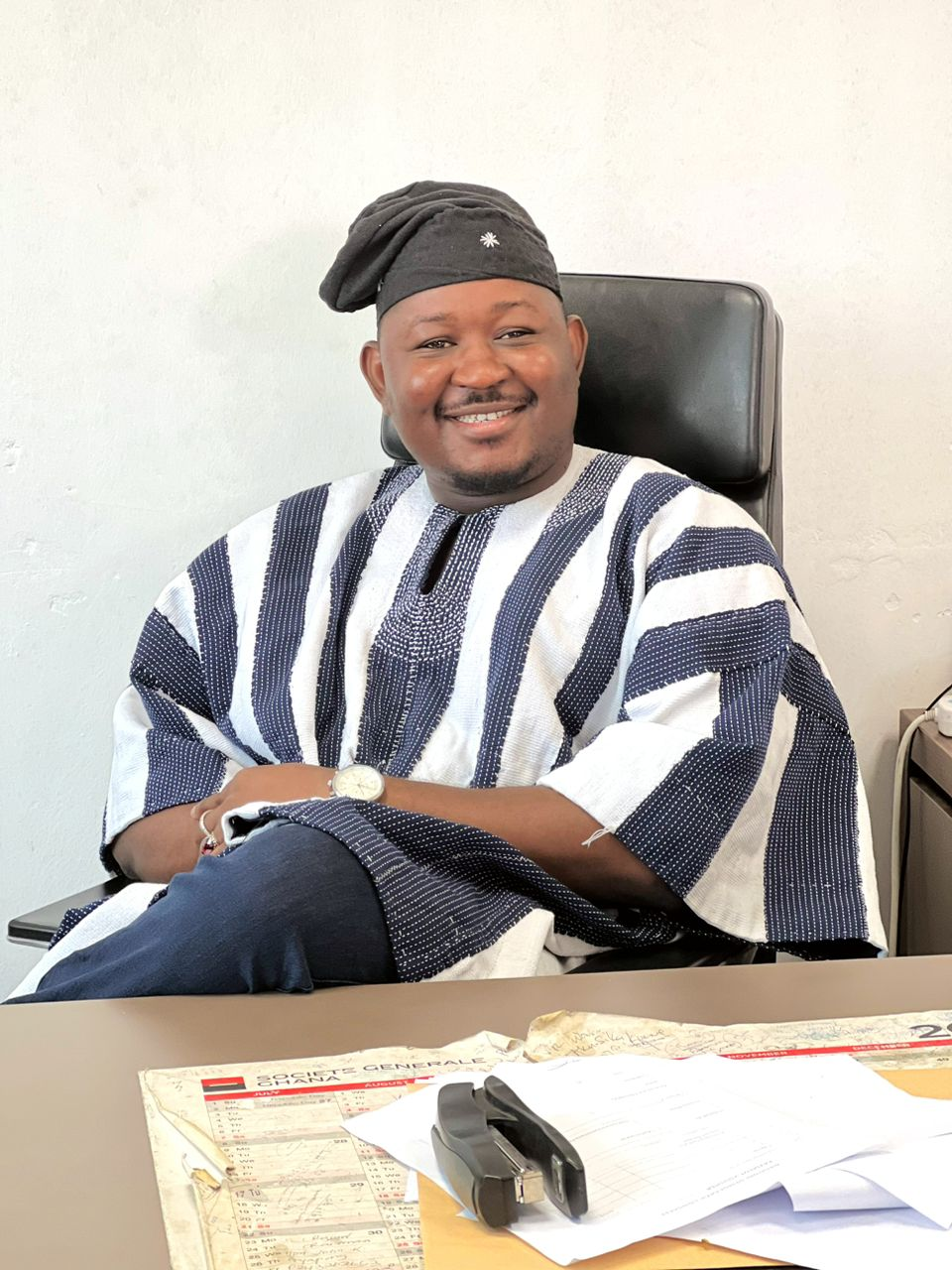
Attah Issah, Ghanaian politician

Attah Issah or Atta Issah is a Ghanaian politician who is a member of the ninth Parliament of the Fourth Republic of Ghana representing Sagnarigu (Ghana parliament constituency) in the Northern Region of Ghana. He is a member of the National Democratic Congress(NDC).

== Education and career ==
Atta Issah was born on 2 May 1992 in Yendi. He completed his West African Senior School Certificate Examination (WASSCE) in 2011 at Business Senior High School in Ghana's Northern Region.

Attah Issah holds BSc in economics from the University of Ghana and master's degree in finance from the University of Professional Studies, UPSA. He went to Business Senior High School (BISCO), Tamale. He also pursued studies in chartered accountancy at the Institute of Chartered Accountancy of Ghana.

Issah worked as an accountant for the NDC. In 2023, he was recognized as leadership personality of the year at the maiden edition of the Northern Ghana Business Awards which was organized by KIP Events and partnered by the Tamale Metropolitan Assembly and the National Communication Authority.

== Politics ==
=== NDC 2023 parliamentary primaries ===
Hon. Attah Issah contested the National Democratic Congress(NDC) 2023 primaries and won with 801 votes of the total votes over Hon. Alhassan Bashir Alhassan Fuseini after receiving 330 votes. Other contenders in the election are Abdul Majid, who had 42 votes, Ahmed Yakubu, who received 120, and Hamzah Abubakar, who polled 27. Therefore, Issah represent the Sagnarigu constituency on the ticket of National Democratic Congress in the 2024 Ghanaian general election.

==== 2024 Ghanaian general election ====
Issah first contested the Sagnarigu constituency parliamentary seat on the ticket of the National Democratic Congress during the 2024 Ghanaian general election and won with 44, 530 votes representing 74.38% of the total votes over Felicia Tetteh of the New Patriotic Party who had 15, 338 votes which is equivalent to 25.62%.

== Parliamentary Committee ==
Attah served as a member of the:

- Finance committee
- Trade, Industry and Tourism.

== Personal life ==
Issa is ethnically Dagomba. He is Muslim. Issah married Hajia Karima.

== Awards ==
He was awarded 2023 Leadership personality of the year by KIP Events.
