= Gbugli =

Coordinates: 9°33′33″N 0°59′05″W

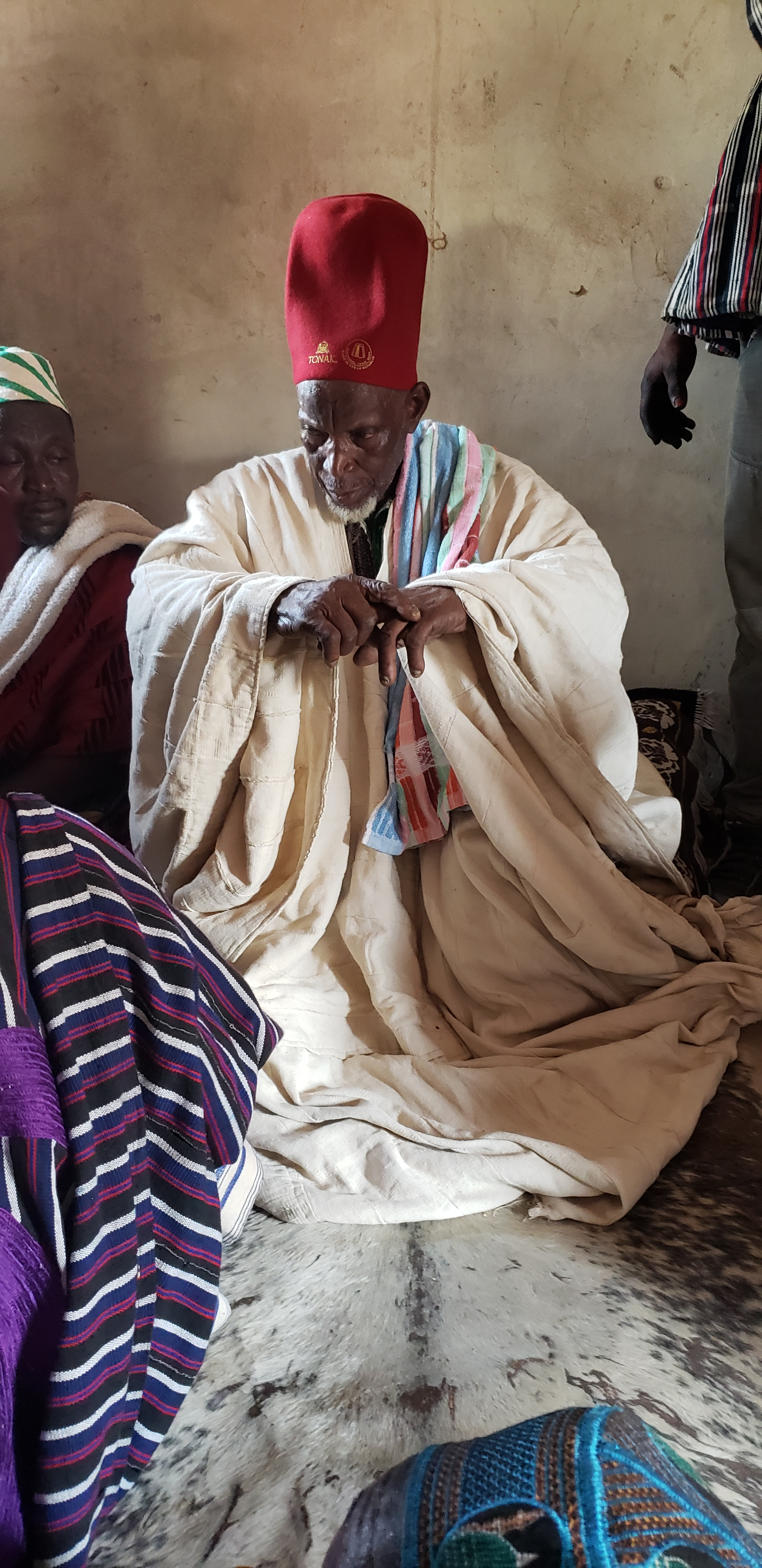
Chief of Gbugli community

Gbugli is a community in Kumbungu District in the Northern Region of Ghana.

== See also ==
- Populated places in Kumbungu District
