= Sagnarigu (Ghana parliament constituency) =

Ghana parliament constituency

- constituency for the Parliament of Ghana
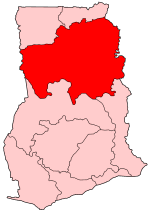
- District: Tamale Municipal District
- Region: Northern Region of Ghana

Current constituency
- Created: 2012
- Party: National Democratic Congress
- MP: Attah Issah

Sagnarigu is one of the constituencies represented in the Parliament of Ghana. It elects one member of parliament (MP) by the first-past-the-post system of election. Attah Issah is the member of parliament for the constituency. Tamale South is located in the Tamale Municipal district of the Northern Region of Ghana.

This seat was created prior to the Ghanaian parliamentary election in 2012.

== Boundaries ==
The Sagnarigu constituency seat is located within the Tamale metropolitan district of the Northern Region of Ghana.

== Members of Parliament ==
Election	Member	Party
2012	Constituency created	
2012	Alhassan Bashir Fuseini.	National Democratic Congress
2016	Alhassan Bashir Fuseini.	National Democratic Congress
2020	Alhassan Bashir Fuseini.	National Democratic Congress

The table below shows the 2012 Ghanaian general election results for Sagnarigu constituency.

2012 Ghanaian parliamentary election: Sagnarigu Source:http://ghanaelections.peacefmonline.com/pages/2012/parliament/northern/
Party	Candidate	Votes	%	±%
National Democratic Congress	Alhassan Bashir Fuseini	29,508	78.79	—
New Patriotic Party	Yakubu Abdul Kareem	6,935	18.52	—
Convention People's Party	Alhassan A Suhuyini	403	1.07	—
Progressive People's Party	Abdul Jamaldeen Ahmed	371	0.99	—
National Democratic Party	Abdul Kahar Adam	235	0.63	—
Majority		29,508	78.79	—

2016 Ghanaian parliamentary election: Sagnarigu Source:http://ghanaelections.peacefmonline.com/pages/2016/parliament/northern/
Party	Candidate	Votes	%	±%
National Democratic Congress	Alhassan Bashir Fuseini	26,898	70.68	—
New Patriotic Party	Habib Iddrisu	7,888	20.73	—
Convention People's Party	Zalia Issah	2,820	7.41	—
Progressive People's Party	Abdul Jamaldeen Ahmed	449	1.18	—
Majority		26,898	70.68	—

=== 2020 election ===
The table below shows the 2020 Ghanaian general election results for Sagnarigu constituency in the Northern Region.

2020 Ghanaian general election: Sagnarigu Source:http://ghanaelections.peacefmonline.com/pages/2020/parliament/northern/
Party	Candidate	Votes	%	±%
National Democratic Congress	Alhassan Bashir Fuseini	34,989	70.68	—
New Patriotic Party	Felicia Tettey	26,434	43.0	—
Majority		34,989	57.0	—

== See also ==
- List of Ghana Parliament constituencies
