= Muhammad Mumuni =

Ghanaian lawyer and politician

Hon. Muhammad Mumuni
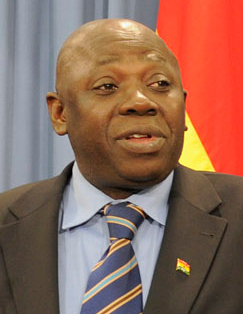

Member of the Ghana Parliament for Kumbungu
- In office January 2013 – April 2013
- Preceded by: Yakubu K. Imoro
- Succeeded by: Moses Amadu Yahaya
- In office January 1997 – January 2004
- Preceded by: Alhassan Musah
- Succeeded by: Yakubu K. Imoro

Minister for Foreign Affairs
- In office Feb 2009 – January 6, 2013
- President: John Atta Mills
- Preceded by: Akwasi Osei-Adjei
- Succeeded by: Hanna Tetteh

Personal details
- Born: 28 July 1949 (age 77)
- Party: National Democratic Congress
- Education: University of Ghana
- Profession: Lawyer

Muhammad Mumuni (born 28 July 1949) is a Ghanaian lawyer and politician. He was re-elected to Ghana's Parliament in the 7 December 2012 General Elections, when he won the Kumbungu Seat. Mumuni left parliament in 2004 when he became John Atta Mills' vice-Presidential running mate.

== Early life and education ==
Muhammad Mumuni had his basic education at the Kumbungu Local Authority Primary School between 1955 and 1960. He then attended the Savelugu Local Authority Middle school from 1960 to 1962. His secondary education was at the Tamale Secondary School from 1962 to 1969. He proceeded to the University of Ghana for his LL.B (Hons). In October 1975, he obtained a barrister at law qualification from the Ghana School of Law.

== Career ==
Mumuni first worked as a Teaching Assistant at the Faculty of Law of the University of Ghana between 1972 and 1974. He then became the National Service Co-ordinator (North) of the National Service Scheme of Ghana between 1975 and 1976. He worked as a Legal Officer at the Bank for Housing and Construction for the period 1976 to 1980. He was also a District Magistrate with the Judicial Service of Ghana between 1977 and 1980. In 1979, he served on the Local Government Grants Commission set up under the Third Republican constitution to allocate development resources to district and local councils in Ghana.

In 1980, he became founder and senior partner in the Yelinzo Law Chambers, a private law firm at Tamale in the Northern Region of Ghana. He held this position till 1997. Between 1980 and 1982, he was the Chairman of the Western Dagomba District Council. During the era of the Provisional National Defence Council government, he was a member of the Northern Regional Consultative Assembly. Mumuni was the president of the Ghana Bar Association (Northern Region Branch) between 1992 and 1996. He was founder and chairman of Bonzali Rural Bank Limited between 1990 and 1995.

He was the executive secretary of the ACP/EU in 2013. He was also a member of the Governing Body of the International Labour Organization (ILO) in Geneva, Switzerland in the year 1999 to 2001 of which he was the President of the 87th Session of the International Labour Conference.

He was the founder and chairman of Bonzali Rural Bank Ltd from 1990 to 1995.

In the year 1994 to 1997, he was the chairman of the Board of Directors of Amasachina Self–help Association an indigenous NGO aimed at developmental projects in communities with the help of contribution, voluntary and communal labour.

Mumuni was the President and a member of the Ghana Bar Association (Northern Region Branch) from 1992 to 1996. In 1995, he was appointed a Member and a representative of the Northern Region for the Lands Commission (Northern Region).

== Politics ==
He was elected Assembly Member for the Yagrafong Electoral area in the Tolon–Kumbungu District Assembly and served for two terms as the presiding member of the assembly between 1992 and 1996.

In the December 1996 parliamentary election, he was elected Member of Parliament (MP) for the Kumbungu constituency on the ticket of the National Democratic Congress and retained his seat in the December 2000 parliamentary election. He was thus MP for two terms spanning January 1997 to January 2001. He also served in the NDC government of Jerry Rawlings as the Minister for Employment and Social Welfare during the second term of his government, ending in January 2001. Mumuni was the running mate of John Atta Mills in the 2004 Ghanaian presidential election. In February 2009, he was appointed by President Mills as the Minister for Foreign Affairs and Regional Integration, a position he continued to hold till 6 January 2013 when a new political cycle began. Mumuni was reported to have been nominated for the First Deputy Speaker of parliament position but refused. He however denied this stating that no offer was made to him.

=== 2000 Elections ===
Mumuni was first elected into Parliament of the Ticket of the National Democratic Congress during the December 2000 Ghanaian General Elections representing the Kumbungu Constituency in the Northern Region of Ghana. He polled 12,477 valid votes cast representing 60.40%. His constituency was a part of the 16 parliamentary seats out of 21 seats won by the National Democratic Congress in that election for the Nlorthern Region. He was elected over Alidu Binda Talhai of the New Patriotic Party, Iddrisu IDDI of the United Ghana Movement Party, Umar M. Hashim of the Peoples National Convention Party and Dawuda Ibrahim of the National Reform Party. These candidates obtained 3,699, 3,555, 456, 339 and 127 votes respectively. These were equivalent to 17.90%, 17.20%, 2.20%, 1.60% and 0.60% respectively of total valid votes cast.

== Family ==
Muhammad Mumuni is married with six children.

== Hobbies ==
Mumuni enjoys tennis, soccer and nature study.

Parliament of Ghana
| Preceded by Alhassan Musah | Member of Parliament for Kumbungu; 1997 – 2005 | Succeeded by Yakubu K. Imoro |
| Preceded by Yakubu K. Imoro | Member of Parliament for Kumbungu; January 2013 – April 2013 | Succeeded by Moses Amadu Yahaya |
Party political offices
| Preceded by Martin Amidu | National Democratic Congress Vice presidential candidate 2004 | Succeeded by John Mahama |
Political offices
| Preceded by David Sarpong Boateng | Minister for Employment and Social Welfare ? – 2001 | Succeeded by Cecilia Bannerman (Minister for Manpower Development and Employment) |
| Preceded by Akwasi Osei-Adjei | Minister for Foreign Affairs; 2009 – 6 January 2013 | Succeeded by Hanna Tetteh |
