= Jegbo =

Coordinates: 9.529°N 1.062°W

Jegbo is a community in Kumbungu District in the Northern Region of Ghana.

== See also ==
- Populated places in Kumbungu District
