= Kasuliyili =

Community in Tolon District, Ghana

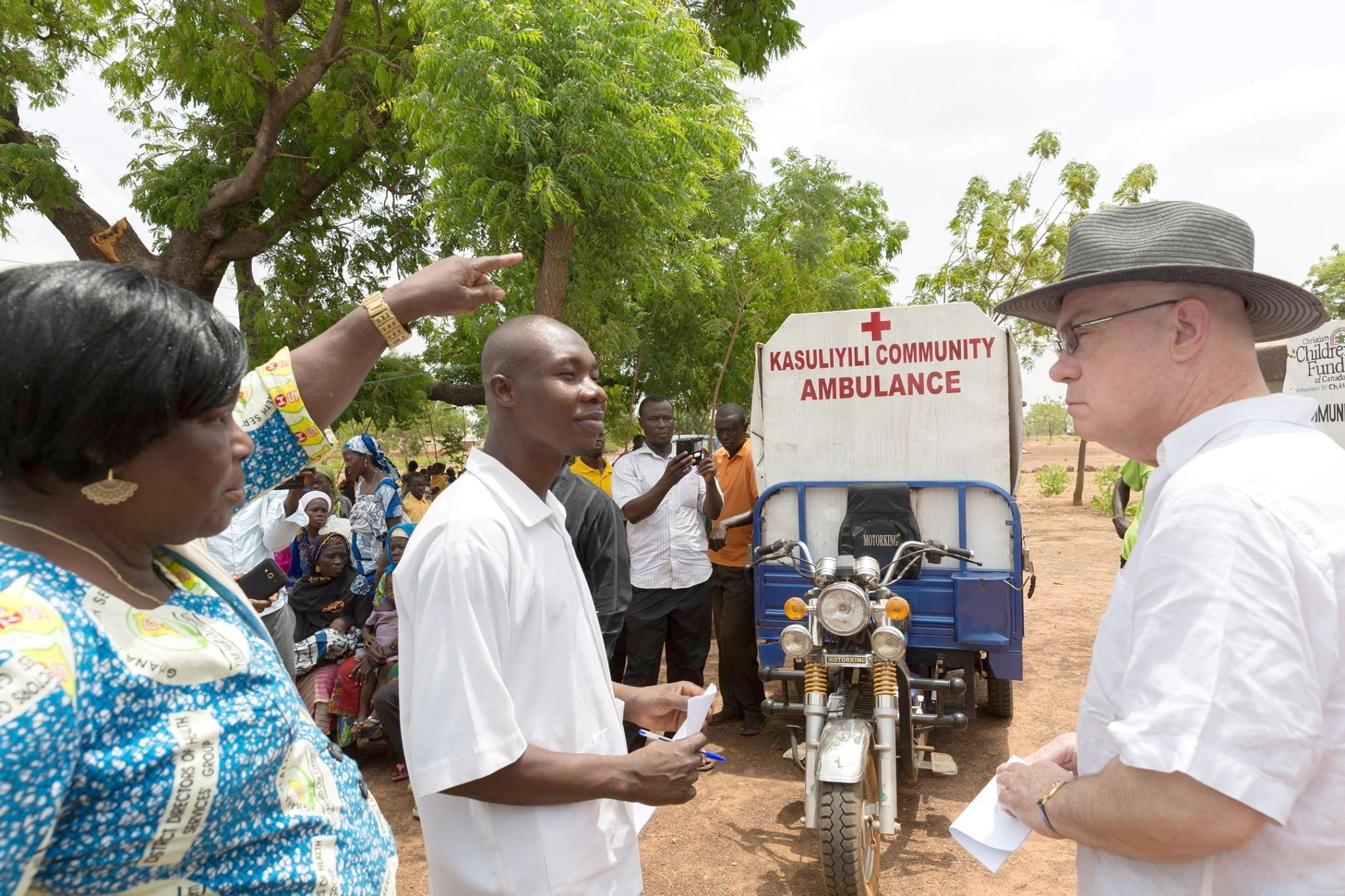
Visit of U.S. Ambassador Robert Porter Jackson (right, with hat) to Kasuliyili in early 2016

Kasuliyili is a community under Tolon District in the northern region of Ghana. Most inhabitants of Kasuliyili community are farmers, including women. There are four basic schools, two Junior High Schools, and one Senior High School in the town. It has a clinic for health delivery. Kasuliyili is ruled by the Kasul Lana, who is enskinned by the King of Dagbon, the Yaa Naa.

== The Legend of Kasul Lana Yahaya ==
Kasul Lana Yahaya is a renowned chief of the town and a prince of Dagbon. He was a fierce warrior and led several expeditions across Dagbon. He is told to have ridden a horse atop a kapok tree, and left the hoofed footprints of the horse on his way up and down.
