= Gbulahagu =

Community in the Northern Region, Ghana

- Village
- Location in Ghana
- Coordinates: 9°21′05″N 0°57′29″W
- Country: Ghana
- Region: Northern Region
- District: Tolon District
- Time zone: UTC+0 (GMT)

Gbulahagu is a community in Tolon District in the Northern Region of Ghana.

== See also ==
- Suburbs of Tolon District
