= Adonbiliyili =

Community in the Northern Region of Ghana

Adonbiliyili is a community in Tolon District in the Northern Region of Ghana.

== See also ==
- Suburbs of Tolon District
