= Tolon District =

- District
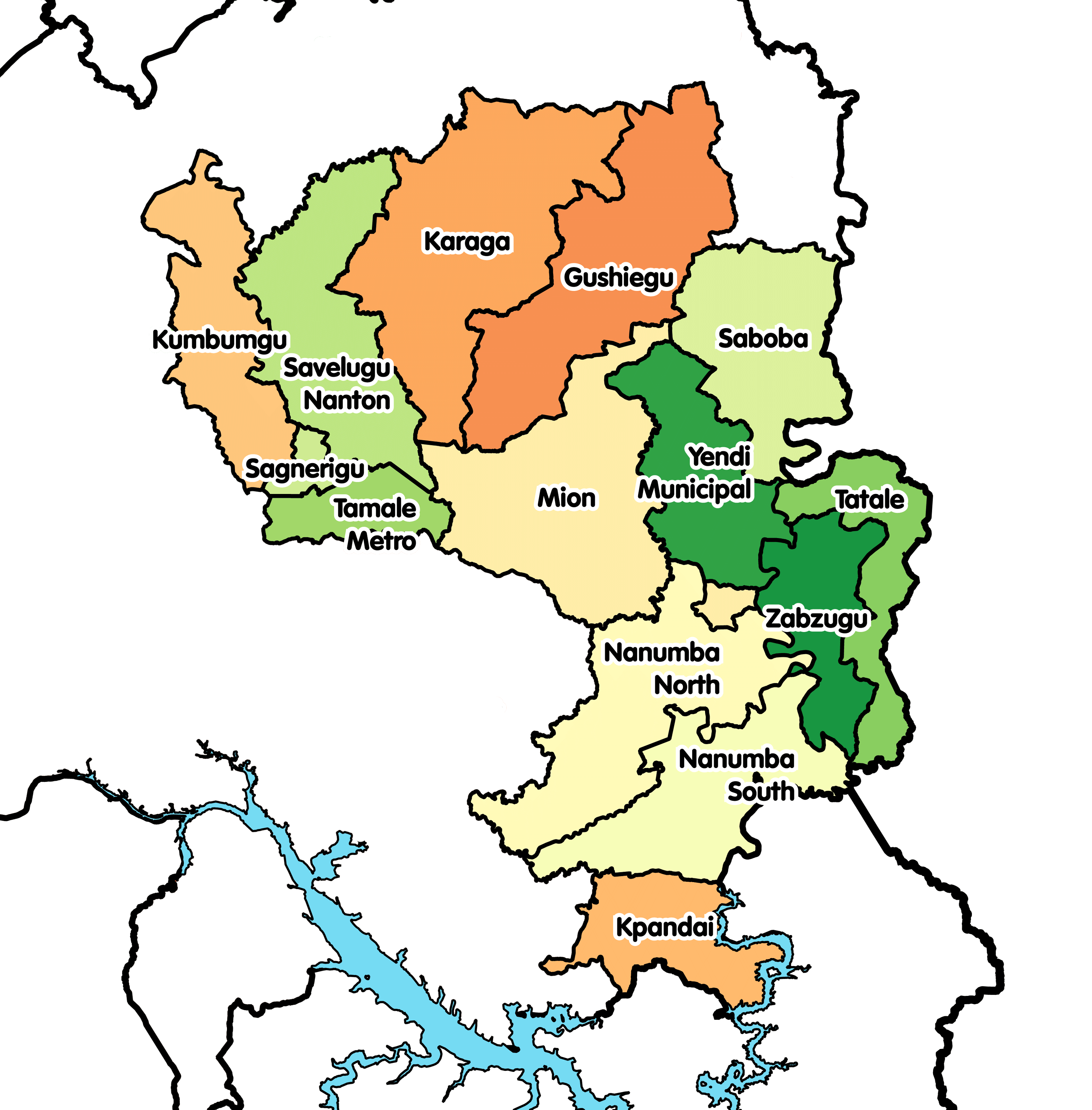
- Districts of Northern Region

- Location of Tolon District within Northern
- Coordinates: 9°25′51.6″N 1°3′53.64″W
- Country: Ghana
- Region: Northern
- Capital: Zabzugu

Government
  - District Executive: Alhaji Yakubu Bukari

Population (2021 census)
  - Total: 118,101
- Time zone: UTC+0 (GMT)
- ISO 3166 code: GH-NP-TL

== Introduction ==
Tolon District is one of the twenty seven districts in Northern Region, Ghana. Originally it was formerly part of the then-larger Tolon-Kumbungu District in 1988, when it harbored the district capital which was then created from the former West Dagomba District Council, until the eastern part of the district was split off to create Kumbungu District on 28 June 2012; thus the remaining part has been renamed to become Tolon District. The district assembly is located in the northwest part of Northern Region and has Tolon as its capital town.

== Communities in the District ==
There are many main-communities in the District. Under their kinship are also Sub-communities.

- Adonbiliyili
- Apleyili
- Asaayili
- Botingli
- Bugulang
- Buiyili
- Cheshagu
- Daasuyili
- Dabogshei
- Fihini
- Gambaya
- Ganoiliga
- Ganviliga
- Gawugu
- Gbrimani
- Gbulahagu
- Gbulung
- Gizaa
- Gundaa
- Gundibong
- Gurugu
- Kaa
- Kambonaayili
- Kanpkagu
- Kasuliyili
- Kpaachiyili
- Kpana
- Kpanyili
- Kpendua
- Kululogu
- Kunkulung
- Kunuguvuhuyayili
- Kuti-kuraa
- Macheliyili
- Namdu
- Nangbagu
- Nyerizegu
- Nyobilbalga
- Sabegu

== Institutions ==
- Tolon Senior High School.
- Kasuliyili Senior High

== See also ==
- "Districts of Ghana". Statoids.
- GhanaDistricts.com
