= Kpendua =

Community in Northern Region, Ghana

Coordinates: 9°30′21″N 1°15′47″W

Kpendua is a community in Tolon District in the Northern Region of Ghana.

== See also ==
- Suburbs of Tolon District
