= Botingli =

Community in Ghana

A pavilion for Arabic and English study in Botingli

Botingli is a community in Tolon District in the Northern Region of Ghana.

== See also ==
- Suburbs of Tolon District
