= Kpilo =

Coordinates: 9°30′N 0°54′W

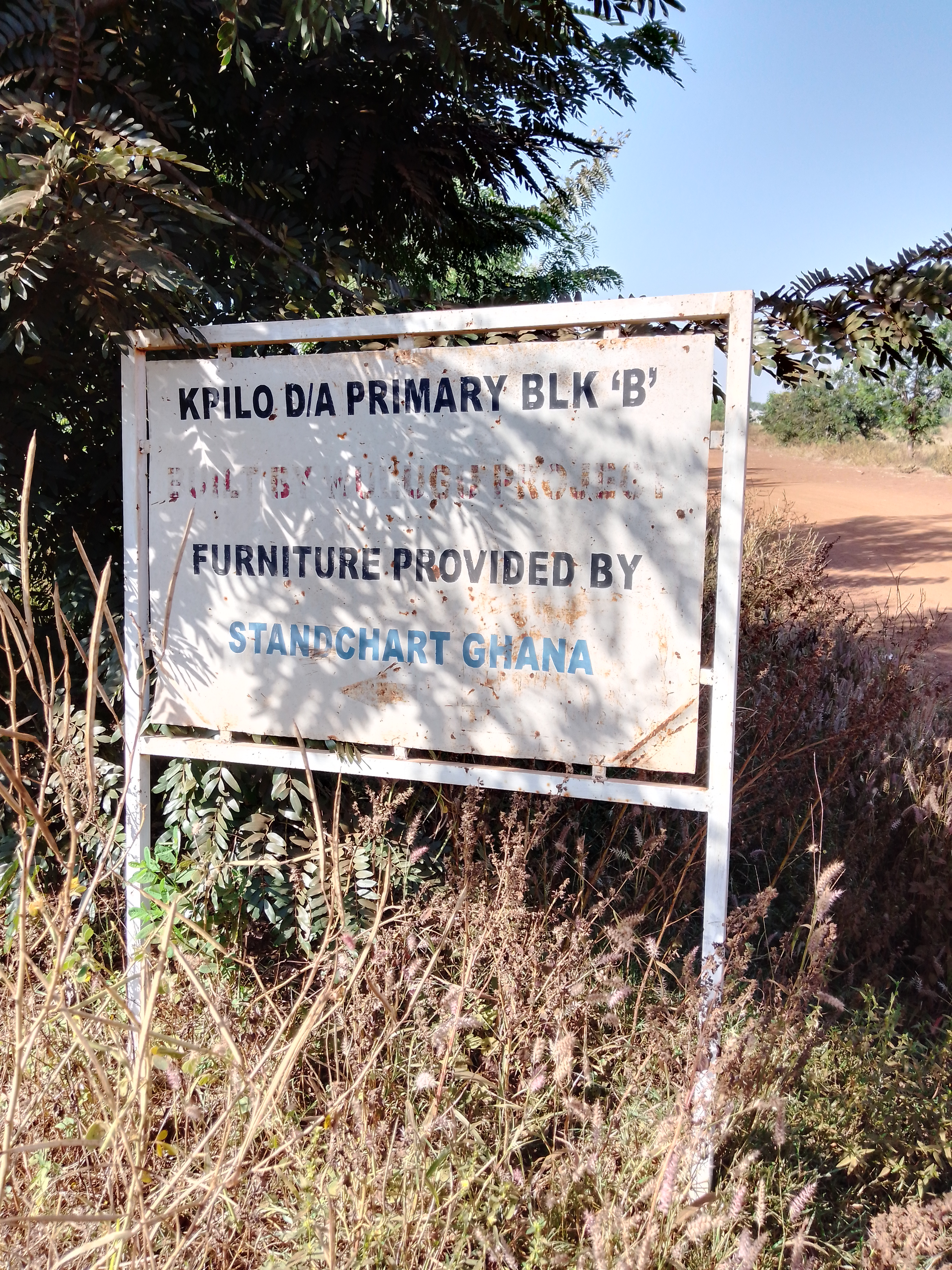
Sign post of kpilo

Kpilo is a community in Kumbungu District in the Northern Region of Ghana. It is a small community with nucleated settlement. The community is less populated with most of its inhabitants being farmers.

== See also ==
- Populated places in Kumbungu District
