= Kaa, Ghana =

Community in Northern Region, Ghana

Coordinates: 9°37′N 1°14′W

Kaa is a community in Tolon District in the Northern Region of Ghana.

== See also ==
- Suburbs of Tolon District
