= Yipelgu =

Coordinates: 9°32′N 1°05′W

Yipelgu is a community in Kumbungu District in the Northern Region of Ghana.

== See also ==
- Populated places in Kumbungu District
