= Gizaa =

Village in Ghana

Coordinates: 9°27′56″N 1°02′40″W

Gizaa is a community in Tolon District in the Northern Region of Ghana.

== See also ==
- Suburbs of Tolon District
