= Gawugu =

Gawugu is a community in Tolon District in the Northern Region of Ghana.

== Water Access ==
The community of Gawugu, faces significant challenges in accessing clean water. Residents often travel long distances to collect water from shallow rivers and muddy streams, which are also used by local livestock.

To address this issue, a fundraising initiative was established, facilitated through connections between the Methodist Church in the United Kingdom and Ghana. The aim was to construct a borehole in Gawugu to ensure a reliable and clean water supply, thereby improving health conditions and economic prospects in the community. The project also focused on reducing the time and effort spent on water collection.

The fundraising campaign, concluding on 17 July 2022, successfully gathered £3,100 from 29 supporters in 41 days. This amount was sufficient to proceed with the borehole construction.

== See also ==
- Suburbs of Tolon District
