= Yizegu =

Coordinates: 9°34′32″N 0°54′21″W

Yizegu is a community in Kumbungu District in the Northern Region of Ghana.

== See also ==
- Populated places in Kumbungu District
