= Zugu-Yipelga =

Coordinates: 9.6033°N 0.9237°W

Zugu-Yipelga is a community in Kumbungu District in the Northern Region of Ghana.

== See also ==
- Populated places in Kumbungu District
