= Shedua, Ghana =

Coordinates: 4°56′N 2°04′W

Shedua is a community in Kumbungu District in the Northern Region of Ghana.

== See also ==
- Populated places in Kumbungu District
