= Asaayili =

Asaayili is a community in Tolon District in the Northern Region of Ghana.

== See also ==
- Suburbs of Tolon District
