= Chanzegu =

Community in Kumbungu District in Northern Region of Ghana

Chanzegu is a community in Kumbungu District in the Northern Region of Ghana.

== See also ==
- Populated places in Kumbungu District
