= Zugu, Ghana =

Coordinates: 11°01′N 0°08′W

Zugu is a community in Kumbungu District in the Northern Region of Ghana.

== See also ==
- Populated places in Kumbungu District
