= Macheliyili =

Community in Tolon District, Northern Ghana

- Location in Ghana
- Coordinates: 9°11′N 1°01′W
- Country: Ghana
- Region: Northern Region
- District: Tolon District

Macheliyili is a community in Tolon District in the Northern Region of Ghana.

== See also ==
- Suburbs of Tolon District
