= Gundaa =

Society in Ghana with fewer people

- Location in Ghana
- Coordinates: 9°27′58″N 1°02′59″W
- Country: Ghana
- Region: Northern Region
- District: Tolon District

Gundaa is a community in Tolon District in the Northern Region of Ghana.

== See also ==
- Suburbs of Tolon District
