= Alhassan Bashir Fuseini =

Ghanaian politician (born 1956)

Hon. Alhassan Bashir Fuseini
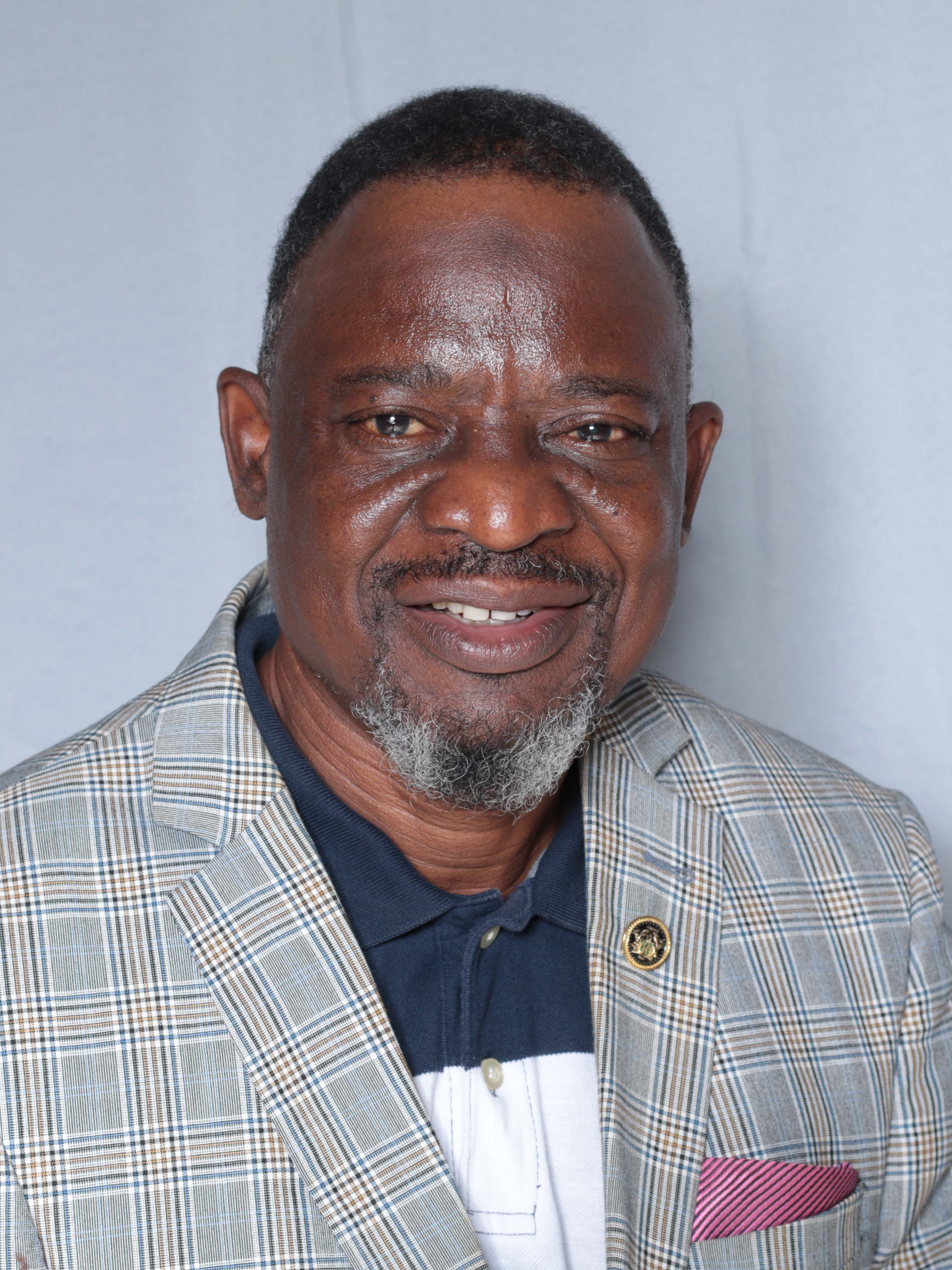
- President: John Dramani Mahama

Personal details
- Born: 2 February 1956 (age 70) Ghana
- Party: NDC
- Education: University of Ghana; University of Essex

Hon. Alhassan Bashir Alhassan Fuseini (born 2 February 1956), popularly known as Alhaji A. B. A. Fuseini, is a Ghanaian journalist and politician, who is the former deputy Northern Regional Minister of Ghana. He is a member of the Seventh Parliament of the Fourth Republic of Ghana representing the Sagnarigu (Ghana parliament constituency) in the Northern Region on the ticket of the National Democratic Congress.

== Personal life ==
Fuseini is a Muslim. He is married with four children.

== Early life and education ==
Fuseini was born on 2 February 1956. He hails from Tamale, a town in the Northern Region of Ghana. He had his secondary education at Yendi secondary school and T.I. Ahmadiyya Senior High School, Kumasi. He earned his first degree at the University of Ghana, after which he entered the University of Essex, UK, obtaining a master's degree in Human Rights in 1993. He also holds a Postgraduate Diploma from the International Institute of Journalism, Berlin. Alhassan Bashir Fuseini was the Night Editor at the Graphic Group Communications Limited from 1987 to 2012 and an M.P since 2012.

== Politics ==
Fuseini is a member of the National Democratic Congress (NDC). In 2012, he contested the Sagnarigu (Ghana parliament constituency) parliamentary seat on the ticket of the NDC sixth parliament of the fourth republic and won.

=== 2012 election ===
Fuseini first contested the Sagnarigu constituency parliamentary seat on the ticket of the National Democratic Congress during the 2012 Ghanaian general election and won with 29,508 votes, representing 78.79% of the total votes. He was elected over Yakubu Abdul Karim of New Patriotic Party, Alhassan A Suhuyini of Convention People's Party, Abdul Jamaldeen Ahmed of PPP and Abdul Kahar Adam of NDP. They obtained 6,935 votes, 402 votes, 371 votes and 235 votes respectively. This is equivalent to 18.52%, 1.07%, 0.99% and 0.63% of the total votes respectively.

=== 2016 election ===
Fuseini was re-elected as a member of parliament for Sagnarigu constituency on the ticket of the National Democratic Congress during the 2016 Ghanaian general election with 26, 898 votes representing 70.58% of the total votes. He won the election over Habib Iddrisu of the New Patriotic Party, who polled 7,888 votes, which is equivalent to 20.73%, parliamentary candidate for Convention People's Party Zalia Issah had 2,820 votes representing 7.41% and the parliamentary candidate for PPP Abdul Jamaldeen Ahmed had 449 votes representing 1.18% of the total votes.

==== 2020 election ====
Fuseini again contested the Sagnarigu constituency parliamentary seat on the ticket of National Democratic Congress during the 2020 Ghanaian general election and won with 34,989 votes, representing 56.96% of the parliamentary candidate over the New Patriotic Party Felicia Tettey who had 26, 434 votes which is equivalent to 43.04% of the total votes.

==== Committees ====
Fuseini is a member of communication committee, housing committee and privileges committee.

===== NDC 2023 primaries =====
During the 2023 NDC primaries, Fuseini lost the election to Attah Issah with 333 votes after the delegates give him 801 votes. Therefore, Attah Issah will represent Sagnarigu constituency on the ticket of National Democratic Congress in the 2024 Ghanaian general election. In the constituency, A.B.A. Fuseini was running for the party's fourth term as leader. Other contenders in the contest included Abdul Majid, who received 42 votes, Ahmed Yakubu, who received 120, and Hamzah Abubakar, who received 27.

== Employment ==
- Night Editor at Daily Graphic, Graphic Communications Group of Companies, Accra
- Deputy Regional Minister for Northern Region, 2013–2017
- Member Parliament (7 January 2013–present; 2nd term)
- Consultant
