= Kpanyili =

Community in Ghana

Kpanyili is a community in Tolon District in the Northern Region of Ghana.

== See also ==
- Suburbs of Tolon District
