= Vogu =

Community in Northern Region, Ghana

Coordinates: 9.5333°N 1.0334°W

Vogu is a community in Kumbungu District in the Northern Region of Ghana.

== Notable natives ==
- Vo-Na Imoru

== See also ==
- Populated places in Kumbungu District
