= Namdu, Ghana =

- Location of Namdu Namdu, Ghana (Africa)
- Coordinates: 9°31′09″N 1°03′54″W
- Country: Ghana
- Region: Northern
- District: Tolon
- Time zone: UTC+0 (GMT)

Namdu is a community in Tolon District in the Northern Region of Ghana.

== See also ==
- Suburbs of Tolon District
