= Kpachi =

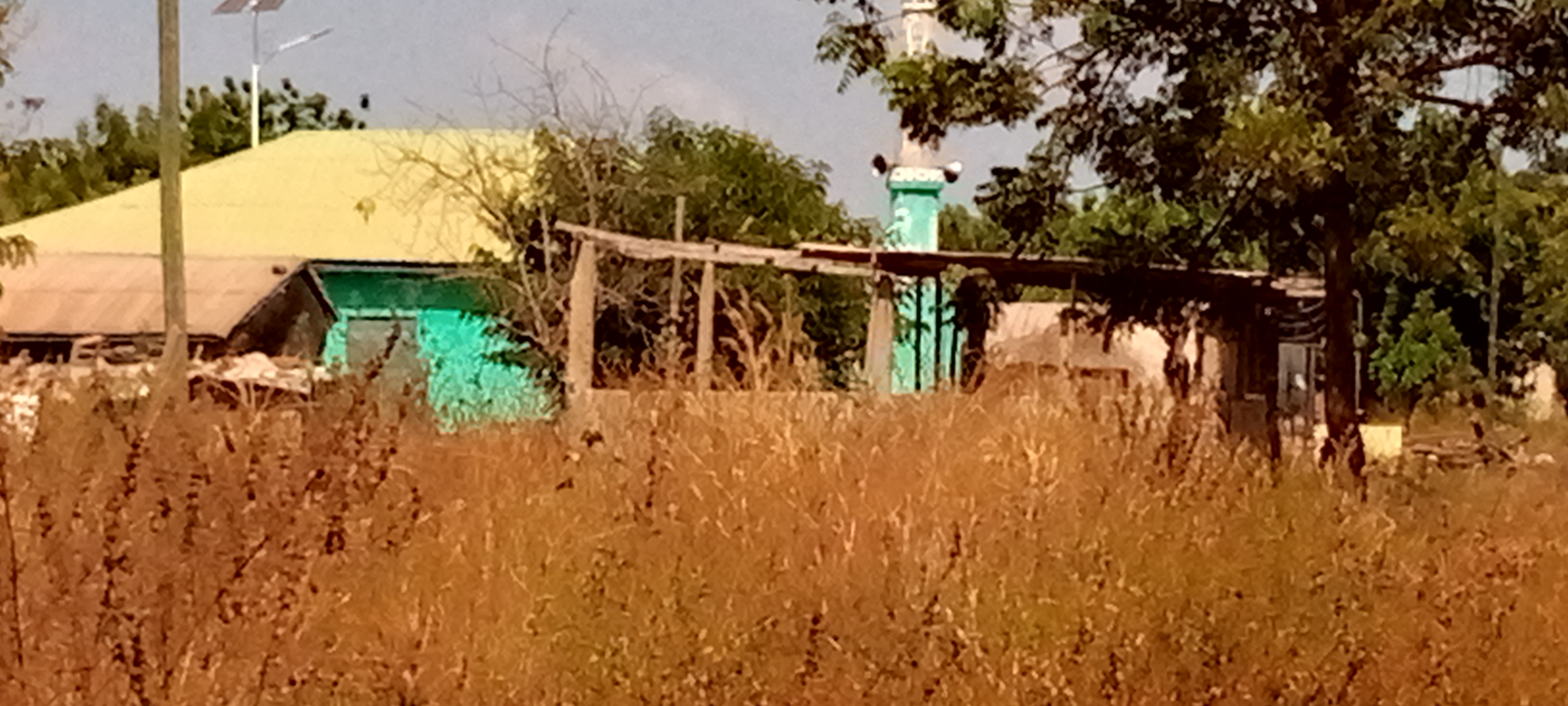
Houses of Kpachi community

Kpachi is a community in Kumbungu District in the Northern Region of Ghana. It is a farming community under the leadership of a Local Chief, and the people depend mainly on farming activities and petty trading for livelihood.

== See also ==
- Populated places in Kumbungu District
