= Tanshegu =

Community in Kumbungu district, Northern Region, Ghana

Tanshegu is a community in Kumbungu District in the Northern Region of Ghana.

== See also ==
- Populated places in Kumbungu District
