= Cheshegu =

Community in the Northern Region of Ghana

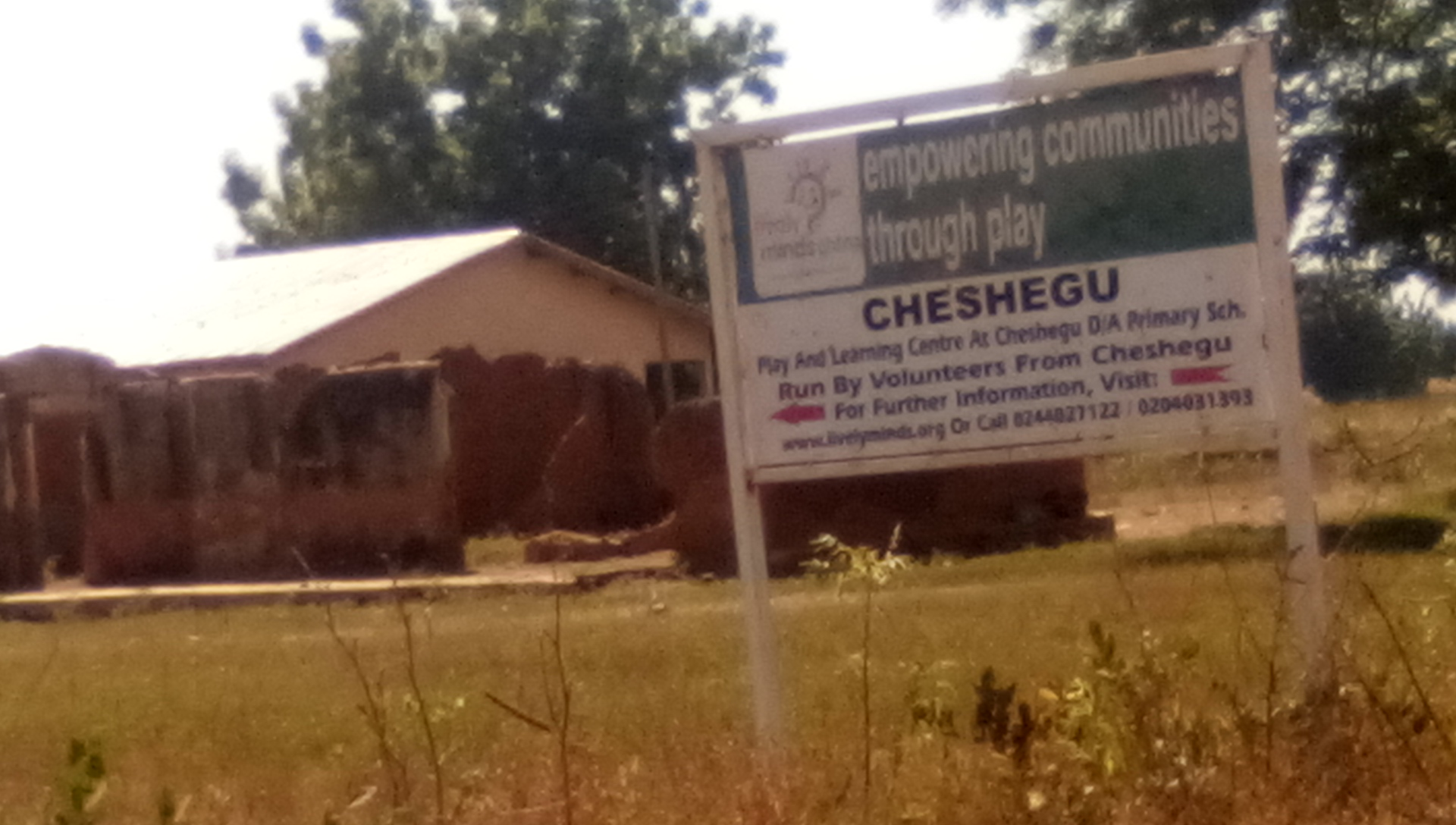
Cheshegu, a community in Kumbungu district Ghana

Cheshegu is a community in Kumbungu District in the Northern Region of Ghana.

== See also ==
- Populated places in Kumbungu District
