= Zoonaayili =

Ghanaian community

Coordinates: 9.4995°N 0.9253°W

Zoonaayili is a community in Kumbungu District in the Northern Region of Ghana.

== See also ==
- Populated places in Kumbungu District
