= Mbanaayili =

Mbanaayili is a community in Kumbungu District in the Northern Region of Ghana. it is a less populated community with a nucleated settlements. A large portion of men in the community are farmers while the rest work with livestock and poultry production

== See also ==
- Populated places in Kumbungu District
