= Banjora =

Coordinates: 9°38′N 1°17′W

Banjora is a community in Tolon District in the Northern Region of Ghana.

== See also ==
- Suburbs of Tolon District
