= Titagya Schools =

Titagya Schools is a non-profit organization that promotes interactive early childhood education in Ghana's three northernmost regions: the Northern Region, Upper East Region and Upper West Region. Titagya Schools was founded in 2008 by Abukari Abdul-Fatawu, Manzah Iddi Habib and Andrew Garza to address northern Ghana's rural adult literacy rate of 22%. In November 2009 Titagya opened a pre-school for 50 children in Dalun, in the Tolon-Kumbungu District of Ghana. 60% of teaching in the school is in English and 40% in Dagbani. The word titagya means "we have changed" in Dagbani. Titagya operated four schools with 300 students as of 2024.

== Pedagogy ==
Titagya's pedagogical approach is derived to a significant extent from the Reggio Emilia approach. Titagya tries to help children learn through play while developing their cognitive, social and emotional skills. Titagya works with the government of Ghana to increase the number of high-quality preschools and kindergartens in North Africa, and with other institutions to reduce the role of rote learning in early education in Ghana, and increase small group activities that encourage critical thinking and social and emotional development.
