= Nawuni =

Coordinates: 9.876°N 0.189°W

Nawuni is a community in Kumbungu District in the Northern Region of Ghana. The settlement is a fishing community who are mostly from the volta region of Ghana. Ghana water company limited draw raw water from the nawuni dam for treatment in dalun.

== See also ==
- Populated places in Kumbungu District
