= Hamza Adam =

Ghanaian politician

Hon. Hamza Adam
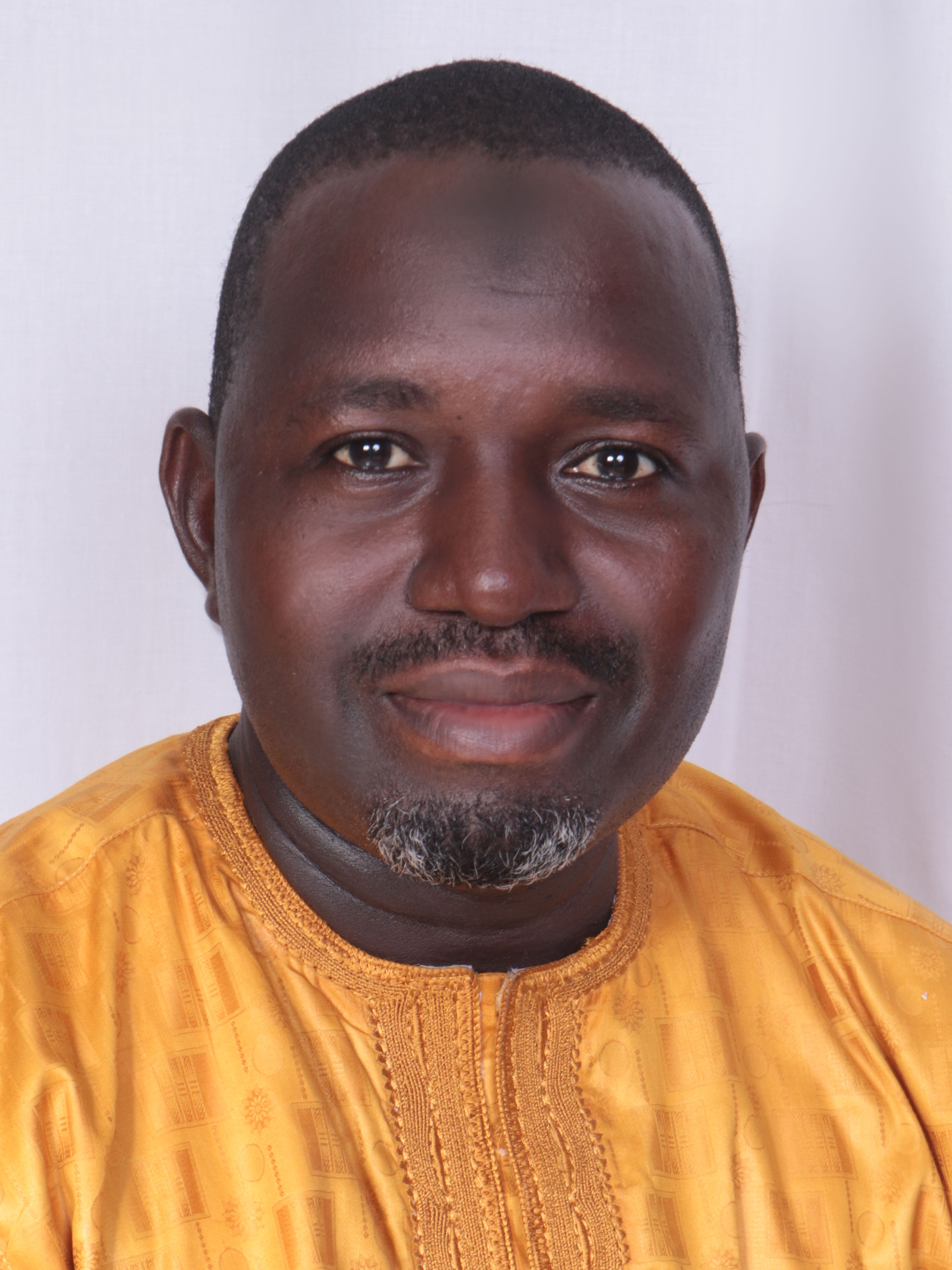

Member of the Ghana Parliament for Kumbungu
- Incumbent
- Assumed office 7 January 2020
- President: Nana Akufo-Addo

Personal details
- Born: 30 October 1975 (age 50)
- Party: National Democratic Congress (Ghana)
- Committees: Environment, Science and Technology Committee, Gender and Children Committee

Hamza Adam (born 30 October 1975) is a Ghanaian politician and member of the National Democratic Congress. He is the member of parliament for Kumbungu Constituency in the Northern Region. He was re-elected as a member of member of parliament for Kumbungu constituency during the 2024 Ghanaian general elections.

== Early life and education ==
Adam was born on October 30, 1975. He holds a PhD in Rural Livelihoods, an MPhil in Agricultural Extension, and a BSc in Agriculture Technology. He also has Teachers' Certifiicate 'A' from Bagabaga College of Education and McGill University certificate.

== Career ==
Adam has worked as a lecturer and a Head of Department at the University for Development Studies. He currently serves in the following committees Environment;

- Business - Member
- Constitutional and Legal Affairs - Member
- Environment, Science and Technology - Ranking Member
- Chieftaincy, Culture and Religious Affairs - Member

== Politics ==
Hon. Hamza Adam is a member of National Democratic Congress and represents the Kumbungu (Ghana parliament constituency) in the Eighth Parliament of the Fourth Republic of Ghana.

=== 2020 election ===
Hon. Hamza Adam first contested the Kumbungu constituency parliamentary seat on the ticket of National Democratic Congress during the 2020 Ghanaian general election and won with 22,961 votes, representing 54.60% of the total votes. He won the parliamentary seat over Abdul Salam Hamza Fataw of New Patriotic Party who polled 17,144 votes, which is equivalent to 40.77%; parliamentary candidate for IND Abukari Abdul Fataw had 1,154 votes representing 2.74%, and the parliamentary candidate for Convention People's Party Nabila Alhassan Basiru had 795 votes representing 1.89% of the total votes.

==== 2024 Ghanaian general election ====
Hamza again contested the Kumbungu (Ghana parliament constituency) seat on the ticket of the National Democratic Congress in the 2024 Ghanaian general election and was re-elected with 27, 242 votes representing 58.66% of the total votes over the New Patriotic Party candidate Abdul Salam Hamza Fataw who had 19,198 votes, which is equivalent to 41.34%.

== Personal life ==
He is a Muslim.
