= Wahab Wumbei Suhuyini =

Ghanaian politician (born 1955)

Member of the Ghana Parliament for Tolon Constituency
- In office 7 January 2009 – 6 January 2017
- Succeeded by: Umar Abdul-Razak

Personal details
- Born: 30 September 1955 (age 70)
- Party: New Patriotic Party

Wahab Wumbei Suhuyini (born 30 September 1955) is a Ghanaian politician and member of the Seventh Parliament of the Fourth Republic of Ghana representing the Tolon Constituency in the Northern Region on the ticket of the New Patriotic Party.

== Personal life ==
Suhuyini is Muslim. He is married, with six children.

== Early life and education ==
Suhuyini was born on 30 September 1955. He hails from Gburimani, a town in the Northern Region of Ghana. He studied at the University of Education, Winneba, obtaining his Bachelor of Education degree in Ghanaian Languages in 1997.

== Career ==
- Vice Principal in-charge of Training, Ghanaian-Danish Community Programme (non-governmental organization), Dalun
- Ghana Education Service Choggu, JSS Tamale

== Politics ==
Suhuyini is a member of the New Patriotic Party (NPP). In 2012, he contested for the Tolon seat on the ticket of the NPP sixth parliament of the fourth republic and won. He was re- elected to represent the constituency in the Seventh Parliament of the Fourth Republic of Ghana.

=== 2012 election ===
Hon. Suhuyini contested the Tolon (Ghana parliament constituency) parliamentary seat on the ticket of New Patriotic Party during the 2012 Ghanaian general election and won with 18,113 votes representing 48.89% of the total votes. He won the election over Umar Abdul- Razak of the National Democratic Congress (NDC), Kass Abdul Latif Tuahir (IND), Ziblila Baba Issfu of the Progressive People's Party (PPP) and Alhassan Adam Damba of the Convention People's Party (CPP). They obtained 15,699 votes, 2,478 votes, 398 votes and 361 votes respectively. These is equivalent to 42.37%, 6.69%, 1.07% and 0.97% of the total votes respectively.

=== 2016 election ===
Suhuyini contested the Tolon constituency parliamentary seat on the ticket of the New Patriotic Party during the 2016 Ghanaian general election and won with 21,782 votes, representing 50.58% of the total votes. He was elected over Umar Abdul-Razak of the NDC who polled 20, 725 votes which is equivalent to 48.12%, parliamentary candidate for the PPP Ziblila Baba Issfu had 304 votes representing 0.17% and the CPP parliamentary candidate Salifu Samson Hussein had 254 votes representing 0.59% of the total votes.
