= West Dagomba District =

- Former District Council
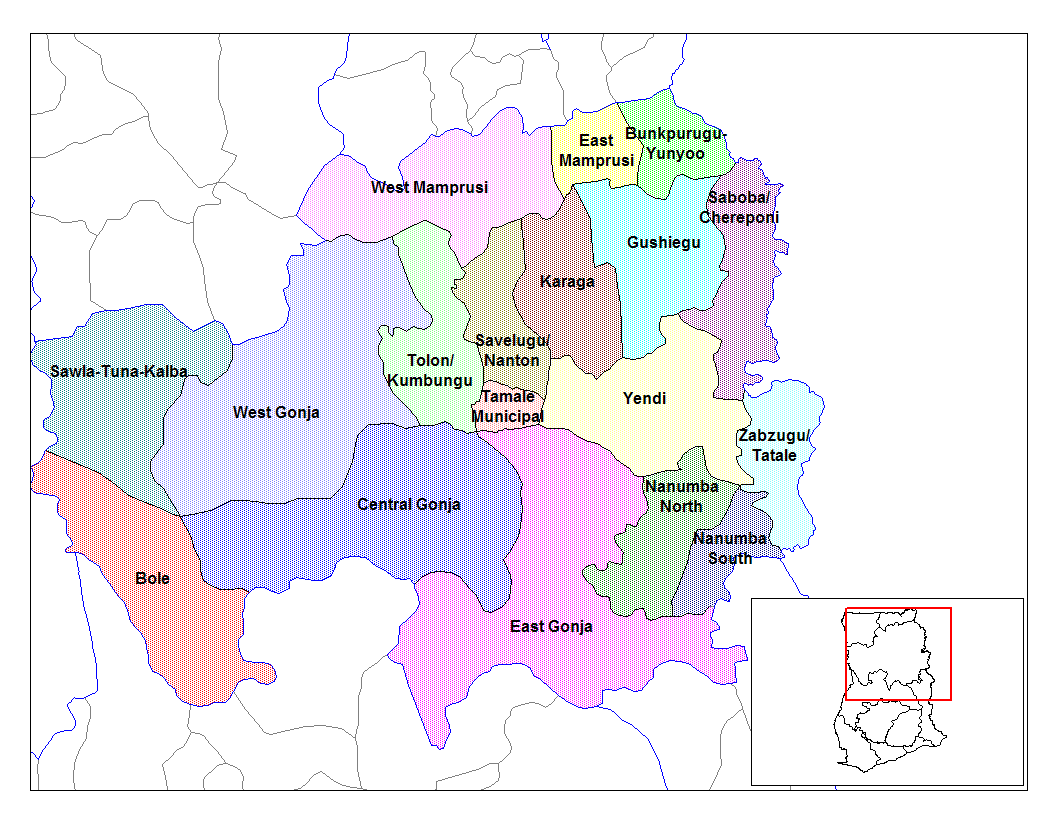
- Districts of Northern Region

- Location of West Dagomba District within Northern
- Coordinates: 9°24′30.1″N 0°50′25.63″W
- Country: Ghana
- Region: Northern
- Capital: Tamale
- Time zone: UTC+0 (GMT)
- ISO 3166 code: GH-NP-__

West Dagomba District is a former district council that was located in Northern Region, Ghana. Originally created as an ordinary district assembly in 1975. However on 1988, it was split off into three new district assemblies: Tamale Municipal District (capital: Tamale), Savelugu-Nanton District (capital: Savelugu) and Tolon-Kumbungu District (capital: Tolon). The district assembly was located in the western part of Northern Region and had Tamale as its capital town.
