= Gurugu, Tolon =

Gurugu, is a community in Sagnarigu district/constituency in the Northern Region of Ghana.

== See also ==
- Suburbs of Tolon District
