= Tolon Senior High School =

Senior high school in Tolon, Ghana

Location
- Tolon, Northern Region; Ghana; 9.423°N 1.052°W

Information
- Type: secondary/high school
- Established: 1991 (35 years ago)
- School district: Tolon
- Head of school: Mohammed Issifu
- Grades: Forms [1-3]
- Enrollment: 2,343

Tolon Senior High School is a second-cycle institution in Tolon in the Northern Region of Ghana. It is a mixed gender institution under the category C group of Ghana Educational Service school placement. Currently, Mohammed Issifu is the headmaster of the school.

The mission of the school is to make Tolon senior high school a choice for motivation, discipline and good academic performance to enable students' progress as balance individuals with requisite knowledge, skills and attitudes that would make them socially, economically and morally functional.

== Programmes ==
The school currently runs 5 programmes which includes;

- Business
- Home Economics
- Visual Arts
- General Arts
- General Science

== History ==
The school was first built as a day school in 1991. In 2019, the school has about 2,343 students.

== School Code ==
0081201
