= Satani =

Community in Ghana

Coordinates: 9°38′N 0°55′W

Satani is a community in Kumbungu District in the Northern Region of Ghana. It is located 8 kilometres north of Kumbungu.
