= Kumbungu District =

District in Northern Region, Ghana

- District
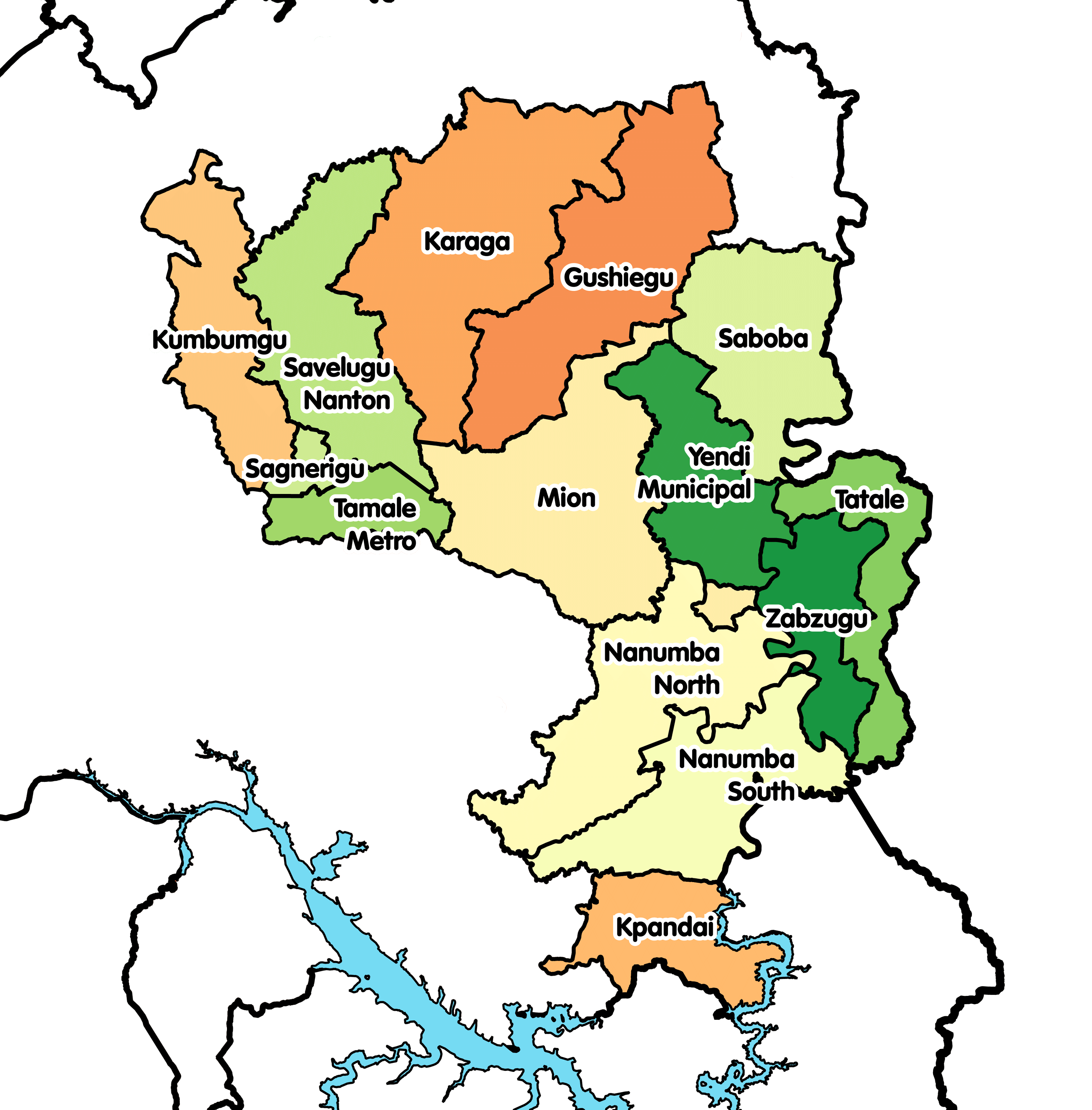
- Districts of Northern Region

- Location of Kumbungu District within Northern
- Coordinates: 9°40′37.92″N 1°1′13.08″W
- Country: Ghana
- Region: Northern
- Capital: Kumbungu

Population (2021)
  - Total: 110,586
- Time zone: UTC+0 (GMT)
- ISO 3166 code: GH-NP-KM

Kumbungu District is one of the sixteen districts in Northern Region, Ghana. The district assembly is located in the northwest part of Northern Region and has Kumbungu as its capital town. Hon. Alhaji Imoro Yakubu kakpagu is the District Chief Executive for Kumbungu District.

Originally it was formerly part of the then-larger Tolon-Kumbungu District in 1988, which was created from the former West Dagomba District Council, until the eastern part of the district was split off to create Kumbungu District on 28 June 2012; thus the remaining part has been renamed to become Tolon District.

== Schools ==
1. Kumbungu Senior High School
2. Kumbungu Vocational Technical Institute
3. Kofi Annan Vocational Technical Institute

== Populated places ==
- Begu
- Bihnaayili
- Chanzegu
- Cheshegu
- Cheyohi
- Dallung
- Digu
- Dindoo
- Dingoni
- Dulzugu
- Fandu
- Gbugli
- Gbulung
- Ginjani
- Jaarigu
- Jakpahi
- Jegbo
- Kpachi
- Kpaliga
- Kpilo
- Kumbungu
- Lugshegu
- Mablo
- Mbanaayili
- Napkatua
- Nawuni
- Nwoduo
- Nwogu
- Nyanpkala
- Shedua
- Silimboma
- Tanshegu
- Vogu
- Yilipkani
- Yipelgu
- Yizegu
- Zangbalun
- Zoonaayili
- Zugu
- Zugu-Yipelga
