= Tolon-Kumbungu District =

- Former District
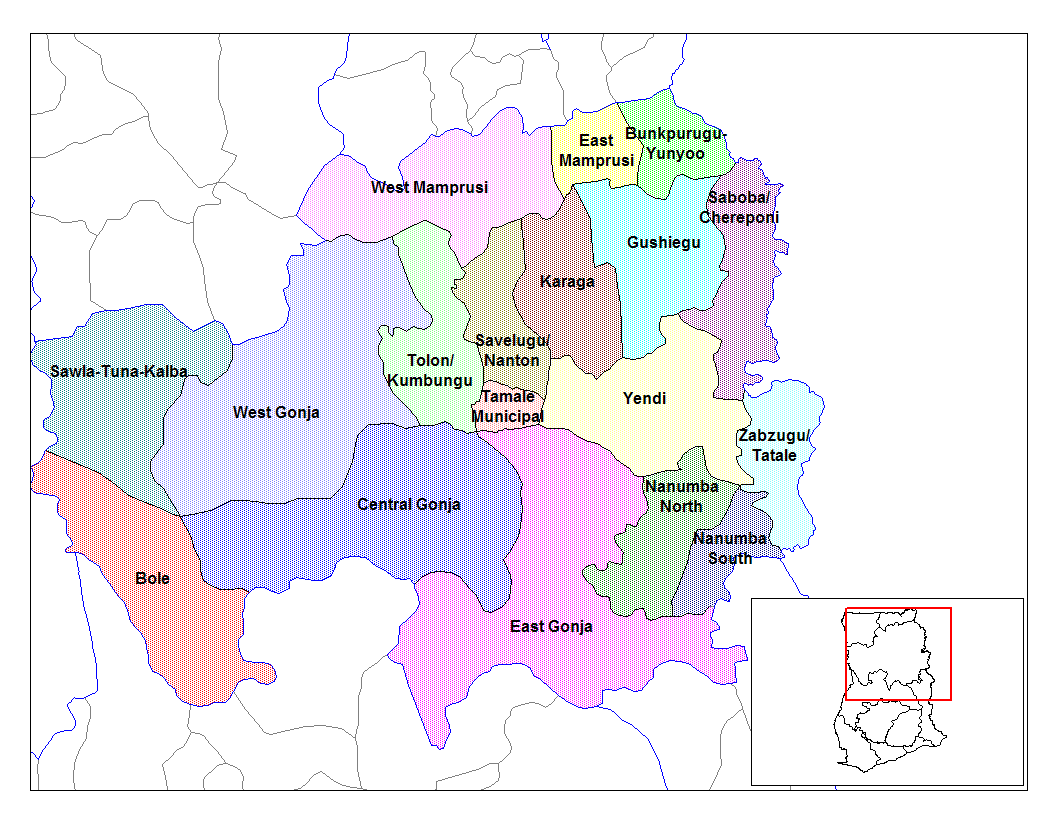
- Districts of Northern Region

- Location of Tolon-Kumbungu District within Northern
- Coordinates: 9°25′51.6″N 1°3′53.64″W
- Country: Ghana
- Region: Northern
- Capital: Tolon

Government
  - District Executive: Wahab Suhuyini Wumbei

Area
  - Total: 2,389 km^{2} (922 sq mi)

Population (2013)
  - Total: —
- Time zone: UTC+0 (GMT)
- ISO 3166 code: GH-NP-TK

Tolon-Kumbungu District is a former district that was located in Northern Region, Ghana. Originally created as an ordinary district assembly in 1988, which was created from the former West Dagomba District Council. However on 28 June 2012, it was split out into two new districts: Tolon District (capital: Tolon) and Kumbungu District (capital: Kumbungu). The district assembly was located in the central part of Northern Region and had Tolon as its capital town.

== See also ==
- "Districts of Ghana". Statoids.
- GhanaDistricts.com
- Titagya Schools
