= Kumbungu =

Coordinates: 9°34′N 0°57′W

Kumbungu is the capital town in the Kumbungu District of the Northern Region of Ghana. Kumbungu is the capital of Kumbungu district. As of 2010, fertility rate in Kumbungu stood at 3.6 (above the national average of 3.5) and had a total population of 39,341 with an almost equal ratio of females to males. Kumbungu has a market center that comes off every sixth day.

== Communities ==
- Zangbalun
- Tibung
- Tiginaayili
- Zuɣu

== Schools ==
=== Senior High Schools ===
1. Kumbungu Senior High School
2. Kumbungu Vocational Technical Institute

== Economic activities ==
Farming and petty trading make up a portion of the economic activities in the town.

== See also ==
- Satani
