= Tolon, Ghana =

Tolon Local language = Dagbanli
- District Capital
- Location of Tolon in Northern Region
- Coordinates: 9°26′N 1°4′W
- Country: Ghana
- Region: Northern Region
- District: Tolon District
- Elevation: 512 ft (156 m)

Population (2013)
  - Total: —
- Time zone: GMT
  - Summer (DST): GMT

Tolon is a small town and is the capital of Tolon District, a district in the Northern Region of north Ghana.
