= Katariga =

Katariga is a small community in Sagnarigu District in the Northern Region of Ghana. It has a dispersed settlement having Kumbuyili, Sugashee and Gurugu as its neighboring communities. Farming is the most common occupation in this community. It is one of the few communities headed by a female(Tindana) in the Northern Region .

== History ==
Katariga is a small community in the Sagnarigu District of Ghana’s Northern Region. It is characterized by a dispersed settlement pattern and is bordered by the communities of Kumbuyili, Sugashee, and Gurugu. Agriculture is the primary occupation of residents. Notably, Katariga is among the few communities in the Northern Region traditionally led by a female Tindana (land priest).

== Neighboring Communities ==
Kumbuyili, Sugashee and Gurugu

== See also ==
- Suburbs of Tamale (Ghana) metropolis
