= Sorugu =

Sorugu is a community in Tamale Metropolitan District in the Northern Region of Ghana.

== Background ==
Sorugu is a less populated community and has nucleated settlement. Communities such as Yongduuni, Salaamba, Gumo and Malishegu are the neighbouring communities of Sorugu. The current chief of the community Kpalisogunaa Alhassan joined his ancestors on Saturday 14 November 2015 in the evening. He took over the mantle of leadership in 1994 from Kpalsogunaa Shani in 1994.

== Location ==
Sorugu is located behind Gumo along the Tamale-Kumbungu trunk road

== Education ==
The community is served with a Primary and Junior High School.

== Economic Activities ==
Most of the inhabitants of the community are farmers(men) and the women are also into sheabutter production.

== Tradition ==
This is a community that has interesting traditions such as: people in the community do not eat a tortoise found in front of a house but rather eat the one that is found at the back of a house.

== See also ==
- Suburbs of Tamale (Ghana) metropolis
