= Choggu Mmanaayili =

Community in the Northern Region of Ghana

Coordinates: 9.495°N 0.896°W

Choggu Mmanaayili is a community in Sagnarigu District in the Northern Region of Ghana. It is located along the Tamale-Kumbungu trunk road. It is a populated community with nucleated settlement.

Demographically, Choggu Mmanaayili recorded a population of 17,809 inhabitants in 2010, with a closely balanced gender distribution (9,015 male and 8,794 female).

== Neighboring Communities ==
The community shares several boundaries with different communities such as Chogu Yapalsi, Kpalisi, Choggu, and Filling Point.

== See also ==
- Suburbs of Tamale (Ghana) metropolis
