= Aliu Mahama =

Vice-President of Ghana from 2001 to 2009

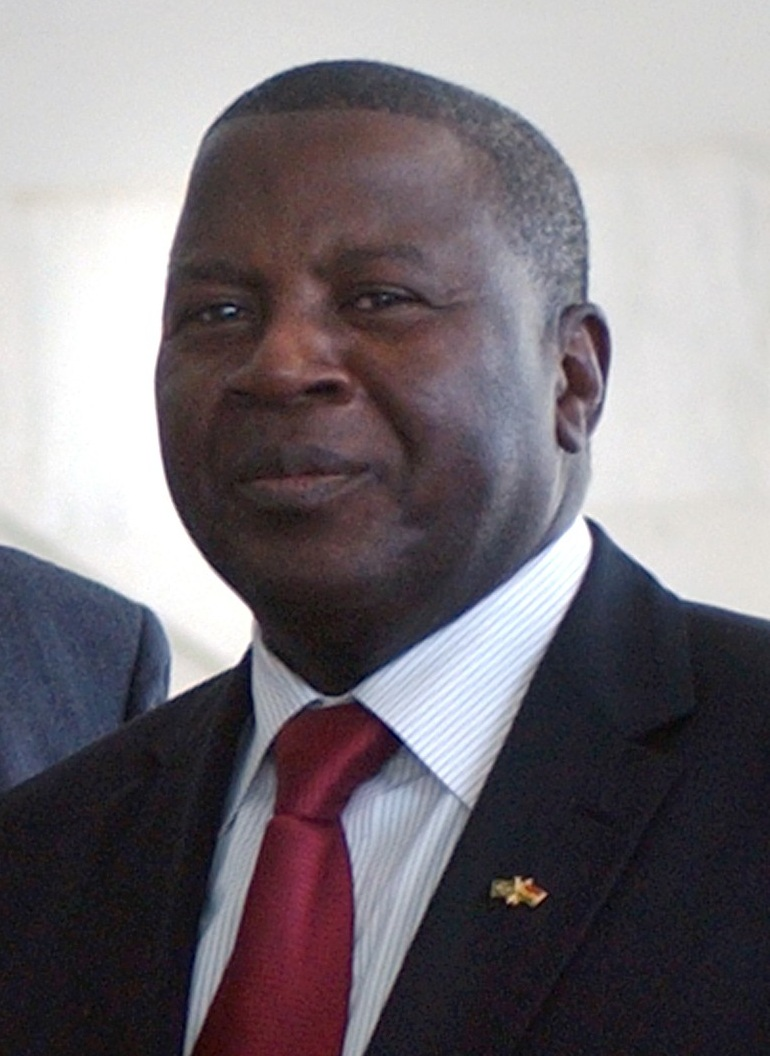

4th Vice-President of Ghana (3rd Vice-President of the 4th Republic)
- In office 7 January 2001 – 7 January 2009
- President: John Agyekum Kufuor
- Preceded by: John Atta Mills
- Succeeded by: John Dramani Mahama

Personal details
- Born: 3 March 1946 Yendi, Gold Coast (then a colony of the United Kingdom)
- Died: 16 November 2012 (aged 66) Accra, Ghana
- Party: New Patriotic Party
- Spouse: Ramatu Aliu Mahama
- Relations: Imoru Egala (father-in-law)
- Profession: Quantity surveyor, civil engineer, contractor

Alhaji Aliu Mahama (3 March 1946 – 16 November 2012) was a Ghanaian engineer and politician who was Vice-President of Ghana from 7 January, 2001 to 7 January, 2009. A member of the New Patriotic Party (NPP), he was Ghana's first Muslim Vice-President.

== Early life and education ==
An ethnic Dagomba, Aliu Mahama as a young man studied at the Government Secondary School in Tamale from 1960 to 1967 for his Ordinary and Advanced Level Certificates. He proceeded to the Kwame Nkrumah University of Science and Technology, ( KNUST) Kumasi from 1967 to 1971 where he obtained the B.Sc. in Building Technology.

Mahama was also an alumnus of the Ghana Institute of Management and Public Administration (GIMPA). He obtained two certificates from the Institute in Project Planning and Management and, in Leadership.

== Career ==
He started his working career at the Bolgatanga regional office of the State Construction Corporation as an Engineer/Construction from 1972 to 1975.

He was promoted to Assistant Regional Manager and posted to the Koforidua Regional Office of the corporation from 1975 to 1976. He held the position of Regional Manager in charge of the Northern Region, Tamale from June 1976 to August 1982.

In 1982, he successfully established his own civil engineering and general construction firm, LIDRA Limited, and became its managing director. He was Chairman of the Northern Regional Contractors Association from 1996 until the December 2000 elections.

He was a counselor on the Yendi District Council in 1978 and an Assemblyman on the Tamale Municipal Assembly in 1990. He was also Chairman of the Economic Development Committee of the Tamale-Louisville Sister State Committee.

He was a board member of several secondary schools in the Northern Region including the Tamale Polytechnic.

He also served as a board member of the Ghanaian Premier League side Real Tamale United, where he was a founding member.

== Personal life ==
He was married to Hajia Ramatu Mahama. Their son Farouk Aliu Mahama is currently the Member of Parliament for Yendi constituency and the board chair of the Ghana Integrated Iron and Steel Corporation.

== Retirement ==
After two terms as vice-president, he sought the New Patriotic Party's nomination for the 2008 presidential election, but at the party's convention in December 2007, he was unsuccessful, obtaining only 6% (146 votes) of total delegate ballots cast. He then retired from politics.

== Death ==
The Ghanaian media circulated rumours of his death on 14 November 2012 at the Korle Bu Teaching Hospital but the story was quickly denied the same day by his family and hospital authorities. He eventually died at the same hospital on 16 November 2012 at the age of 66 from a heart-related condition and complications from a stroke. He died almost four months after Ghanaian President John Atta Mills died.

=== State funeral ===
A state funeral, attended by hundreds, was held for him on 18 November 2012 per Islamic funeral prayer rites (Janaza) at the Independence Square in the capital, Accra. In addition, he was accorded ceremonial military honours including an army procession accompanying the cortège and a 19-gun salute usually given to departed vice-presidents.

=== Burial ===
His body was later flown in a Ghana Air Force jet to Tamale in the Northern Region for burial at his private residence. He was buried in Kalpohin and his wife Ramatu Aliu Mahama was also buried closer to him.

Political offices
Preceded by John Atta Mills	Vice-President of Ghana; 2001–2009	Succeeded by John Dramani Mahama
