= Gumani =

Community in northern Ghana

Coordinates: 9°27′N 0°46′W

Gumani is a community in Tamale Metropolitan District in the Northern Region of Ghana. It has a linear settlement with roads constructed within the community linking it to the Tamale-Bolgatanga trunk road. It is a populated community.

== See also ==
- Suburbs of Tamale, Ghana
