= Zagyuri =

Zagyuri is a community in Tamale Metropolitan District in the Northern Region of Ghana. Tamale School of Hygiene is situated at this location. It is located along the Tamale-Bolgatanga trunk road. Zagyuri is a large populated community and one of the finest modern designed structures located in the new settlement. Zagyuri Anglican, Miskaya School, Ambition and many other schools are local schools. A spinal clinic is also located here. It also has a lot of hotels including Grand Sophia, M&J

== HISTORY ==
Zagyuri developed over time as Tamale expanded northward along major transport routes. Its growth is tied to the suburbanization of Tamale during the late 20th and early 21st centuries.

== LOCATION AND ADMINISTRATION ==
Zagyuri is administratively under the Sagnarigu Municipal Assembly. It borders other suburbs such as Kanvili. The Tamale–Bolgatanga trunk road runs through or near the community, providing road access to Tamale and other towns.

== DEMOGRAPHICS ==
There are no publicly available census data that break out Zagyuri's population separately. Instead, demographic information is typically reported at the district level using figures for Sagnarigu Municipality from national and municipal reports.

== ECONOMY AND LAND USE ==
Local economic activity in Zagyuri includes small-scale trading, services, and urban or peri-urban agriculture. In particular, research on Tamale's peri-urban areas identifies Zagyuri (or surrounding similar areas) as a site for vegetable farming and livestock, with documented tensions between livestock herders and crop farmers.

== See also ==
- Kanvili
- Jisonaayili
