= Kumbuyili =

Community in Sagnarigu District, Northern Region, Ghana

Kumbuyili is a community in Sagnarigu District in the Northern Region of Ghana. It is a dispersed settlement located along the Tamale-Kumbungu road having Gurugu, Malshagu and Zagyuri as its neighboring communities.

== History ==
Kumbuyili developed as part of a cluster of settlements around the Malshegu area. Ethnographic studies describe Kumbuyili as the section of the settlement associated with the compound of the traditional fetish priest (known locally as Kpalna), while nearby Malshegu grew around the chief’s palace. This dual structure is common among communities in Dagbon.

For generations, residents of Kumbuyili have practiced traditional farming methods. These include intercropping, fallow periods, and the use of animal manure methods that help maintain soil fertility and support long-term sustainability.

== Administration ==
Kumbuyili falls under the Sagnarigu Municipal Assembly, which was officially created in 2012 under Legislative Instrument (L.I.) 2066.

According to the 2010 Population and Housing Census, the municipality recorded a population of 148,099. Kumbuyili is part of the smaller local administrative units used for planning, budgeting and development activities.

== Economy ==
Agriculture is the main economic activity in Kumbuyili. Many residents are engaged in smallholder crop farming and livestock rearing.

In 2023, a shea butter processing center was established in the community. The centre supports women's cooperatives and is equipped with a kneader, crusher, roaster, and miller. This facility has strengthened local livelihoods and provided additional income sources for women.

== Social Development ==
The Sagnarigu Municipality, which includes Kumbuyili, has benefited from child protection and gender-focused projects by NGOs such as SOS Children’s Village. These projects support efforts to reduce child marriage and improve community well-being.

Like many communities in the Northern Region, Kumbuyili faces sanitation challenges, including issues related to open defecation.

== Culture and Environment ==
Kumbuyili is closely linked culturally and geographically to the Malshegu Sacred Grove, a significant religious and ecological site in Northern Ghana. Traditional beliefs surrounding the grove help protect the environment by enforcing taboos against cutting trees or grazing animals within the sacred area.

These practices have contributed to biodiversity conservation and the preservation of cultural heritage

== See also ==
- Suburbs of Tamale (Ghana) metropolis
