= Garizegu =

Garizegu is a community located in the Sagnarigu Municipal District of the Northern Region, Ghana. It is a nucleated community located along the Tamale-Tolon road to the right side. The community is situated nearby to Nangbagu and Changnaayili.
