= List of universities in Benin =

This is a list of universities in Benin as accredited by the Ministry of Higher Education, Benin.

== Public universities ==
List of public universities from the Ministry of Higher Education and Scientific Research of Benin:

- University of Abomey-Calavi
- University of Kétou
- University of Parakou

== Private universities ==
- Institut Supérieur de Formation Professionnelle (ISFOP)
- Lakeside University College (LUC) Benin
- African University of Bénin
- Afriford University, Cotonou, Benin Republic
- Canadian International Education Institute, Benin Republic
- Université Protestante de l'Afrique de l'Ouest (UPAO), (Protestant University of West Africa)
- Centre International Universitaire Des Meilleurs (CIUM-Bestower International University) Seme-Podji, Cotonou
- Ecole Superieure de Gestion et de Technologie (ESGT-Benin University)
- Ecole Superieure de Technologie et de Gestion (ESTG-Benin University)
- Ecole Superieure des Cadres et Techniciens, (ESCT-Benin), Benin Cotonou
- Ecole Superieure des sciences, de commerce et administration des enterprise du Benin (ESCAE-BENIN)
- Ecole Superieure Panafricaine de Management Applique (ESPAM-FORMATION),
- Ecotes university
- Edexcel University
- Esep le berger Université
- ESTAM University Seme Campus
- Heim Weldios University
- Houdegbe North American University, Benin
- Institut Universitaire du Bénin (IUB)
- Institut Supérieur de Communication et de Gestion(ISCG-Benin University),
- Institut Supérieur De Management Et De Technologie (ISMT St Salomon University)
- Institute Regional Superieure des beaux arts, de la culture et de la communication (IRSBACCOM UNIVERSITY)
- International university of management and administration, Benin Republic (IUMA)
- Institut University of science economique and applied science (IUESBA) Benin
- Pinnacle African University Porto Novo
- Poma University, Ayetedjou, Ifangni
- Protestant University of West Africa
- Université Africaine de Développement Coopératif
- Université des Sciences Appliquées et Management USAM
- Université la Hegj, Benin (Semepodji campus)
- Universitie Polytechnique Internationale du Benin
- West African University Benin, (WAUB), Benin Republic Cotonou
- Ifatoss University - BENIN, Benin Republic Cotonou
- Ecole Superieure d'administration, des economie et des métiers de L'audio-visuel.Benin (ESAE-BENIN).
