= Kalpohin Senior High School =

Public school in Northern Region, Ghana

Coordinates: 9.4166°N 0.8307°W

- Kalpohin Estates, Northern Region; Ghana

Information
- Type: Secondary/high school
- Established: 1987 (39 years ago)
- Grades: Forms 1-3
- Nickname: KALISCO

Kalpohin Senior High School (also known as KALISCO) is a public mixed-gender school located at Kalpohin Estates in the Tamale Metropolis in the Northern Region of Ghana. It was established in 1987. It is a category B school under Ghana Education Service School Placement module.

== Courses ==
Kalisco offer 6 academic programs which are:

- Agriculture Science
- General Arts
- Home Economics
- Visual Arts
- General Science
- Business

== Houses ==
- Nyanshagu
- Kalpohin
- Tishigu
- Salamba
