= SSNIT Flats =

SSNIT Flats is a community in Tamale Metropolitan District in the Northern Region of Ghana. It is enclosed in the village of Fuo.

== See also ==
- Kalpohin Estate
