= Ramatu Aliu Mahama =

Former second lady of Ghana (1951–2022)

Second Lady of Ghana
- In role 7 January 2001 – 7 January 2009
- Preceded by: Ernestina Naadu Mills
- Succeeded by: Lordina Mahama

Personal details
- Born: Ramatu Egala; 15 October 1951 Gold Coast
- Died: 7 April 2022 (aged 70) Accra, Ghana
- Party: New Patriotic Party
- Spouse: Aliu Mahama
- Children: Farouk Aliu Mahama
- Parent: Imoru Egala (father)

Ramatu Aliu Mahama (née Egala, 15 October 1951 – 7 April 2022) was a Ghanaian educationist who served as the second lady of Ghana from 2001 to 2009. Mahama was the wife of the 4th vice-president of Ghana, the late Aliu Mahama.

== Early life and career ==
Mahama was born on 15 October 1951. Mahama was an educationist in Tamale, the capital city of the Northern Region and the Second Lady of Ghana from 6 January 2001 to 7 January 2009.

== Personal life ==
Mahama was the daughter of the late politician Imoru Egala, a Minister for Trade and Industry and first Ghanaian chairman of COCOBOD, in the first republic. Mahama was married to the late Alhaji Aliu Mahama, who was the vice-president for Ghana from 2001 to 2009. She is also the mother of Farouk Aliu Mahama the member of parliament for the Yendi Constituency. She had four children; Salma Mahama, Farouk Mahama, Fayad Mahama and Halim Mahama. In September 2021, there were reports of her death which were later denied by her son Farouk Mahama via an official statement on social media platform Facebook. Mahama was a Muslim.

=== Death and funeral ===
Mahama died at the Korle-Bu Teaching Hospital on 7 April 2022, at the age of 70. She had been battling a heart-related illness for about two years. The following day, Hajia Ramatu Mahama was laid in state at the Black Star Square in the morning of 9 April 2022 and a memorial service held in her honour. The National Chief Imam, Osman Nuhu Sharubutu led prayers for her and the Islamic Ṣalāt al-Janāzah prayer for departed soul was said for her. Hajia Ramatu Mahama's body was transported to Kalpohin, Tamale to where a final burial service was done before she was buried beside her husband. At the funeral, former president John Kufuor eulogized her saying,

"She was thoughtful and supported her husband, who was Vice-President during my time in government. She was a great hostess any time we traveled to the north, especially around Tamale."
