= Abdulai Salifu Asuro =

Ghanaian academic

Professor Abdulai Salifu Asuro
- Born: July, 1960 (age 64); Tamale, Ghana
- Employer: Madina Institute of Science and Technology

Professor Abdulai Salifu Asuro (born 1960) is a Ghanaian professor from Tamale. He was vice-chancellor of Tamale Technical University (formerly Tamale Polytechnic). He is the current president of the Madina Institute of Science and Technology.

== Education ==
He began his academic journey at Gumbihini RC Primary School, Tamale, in September 1968. He continue to Ghana Secondary School, Tamale in September, 1975 where he sat the General Certificate of Education Ordinary Level (GCE O' Level) examinations.

He proceeded to Bagabaga Teacher Training College, Tamale, where he completed his training as a Certificate 'A' 3-Year Post-Secondary teacher.

He proceeded to Advance Teacher Training College, Winneba where he pursued his Advance Teacher's Training Diploma in English.

He proceeded to Advance Teacher Training College, Winneba where he pursued his Advance Teacher's Training Diploma in English. He served the nation for two years in Bagabaga before advancing into the University of Ghana, Legon twice, first between 1991 and 1994 where he pursued Bachelor of Arts degree (Drama & Theatre Studies and Linguistics); and from 1997 to 2000 where he bagged his Masters of Philosophy degree in linguistics. He left for the United States of America where he studied at Indiana University, Bloomington between 2004 and 2008 and returned with a Doctor of Philosophy degree in Folklore.
