= Kanvili =

Community in Northern Region, Ghana

Coordinates: 9°27′30″N 0°50′40″W

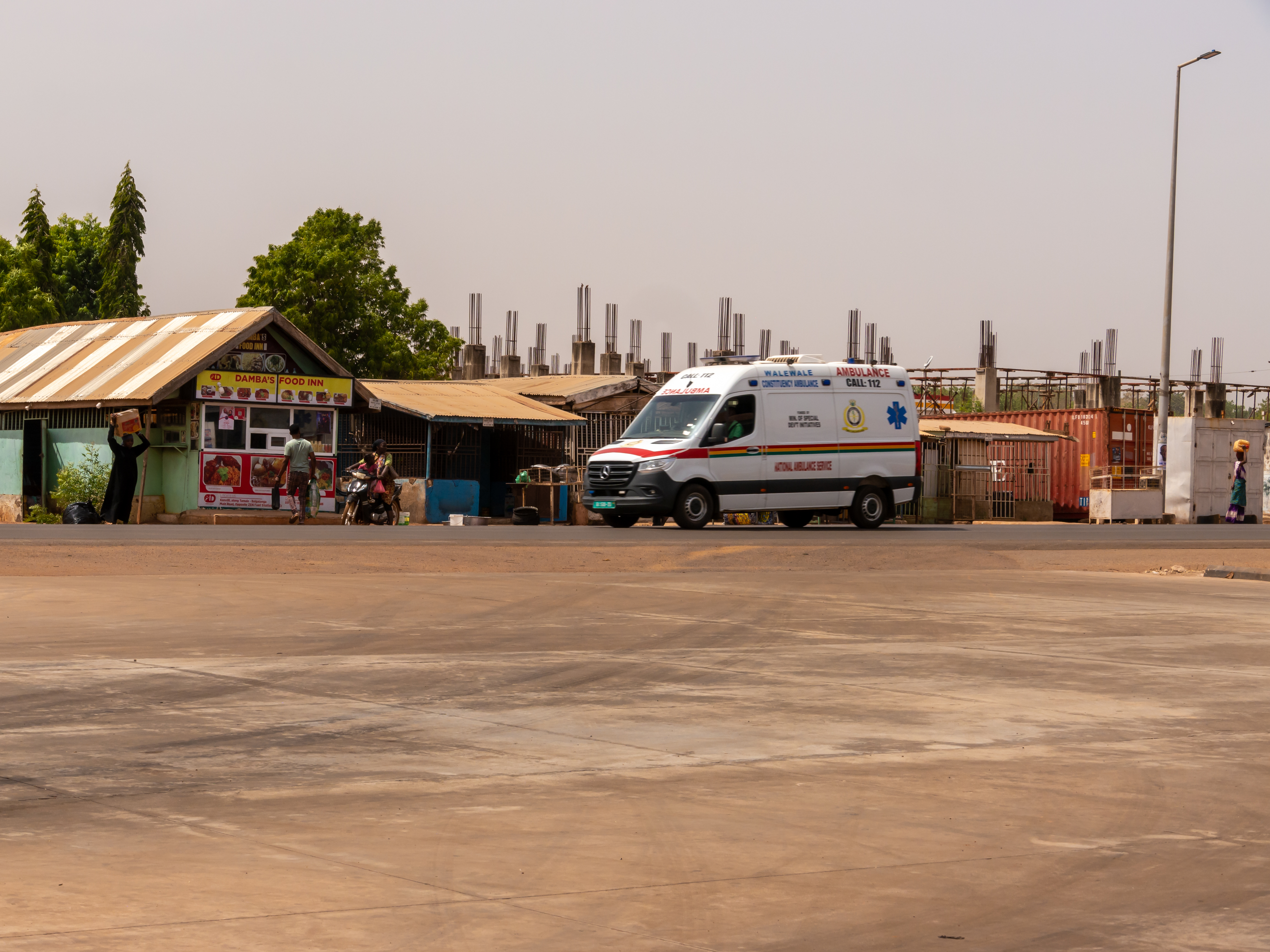

Kanvili is a community in Tamale Metropolitan District in the Northern Region of Ghana. It has a nucleated settlement located along the Tamale-Bolgatanga trunk road. It is a populated community.

== See also ==
- Jisonaayili
