= Michael Olusanya =

Nigerian mental health counselor

- Born: 10 June 1986 (age 40); Lagos, Nigeria
- Occupation: Mental health counselor
- Known for: Restorative practices in the justice system
- Website: greenwayin.org

Michael Olusegun Olusanya (born 10 June 1986) is a Nigerian American mental health counselor. He is the founder of the Greenway International Foundation, a youth-driven nonprofit focused on environmental conservation and psychological wellness.

== Early life and education ==
Olusanya grew up in Lagos, Nigeria. In 2016, he received a Bachelor of Science in Business Administration and Management from ISFOP Benin University in the Republic of Benin.

== Career ==
=== Greenway International Foundation ===
In 2017, Olusanya founded Greenway International Foundation, a nonprofit that promotes tree planting and mental wellness among youth. The organization set a goal of planting over five million fruit trees across Africa by 2030. He also developed biodegradable food packaging from cassava and sugarcane to reduce plastic waste. He also urged the Ghanaian government to sensitize schools on tree planting.During COVID‑19, he said the first wave was a “big blow” that nearly forced the foundation to close.

Earlier roles included program director at Made in Heaven (advocating for children's rights) and executive vice president at Atlantic Business Concept Ventures (eco-tourism).

In 2018, he took part in a tree planting ceremony at the Embassy of Cuba in Ghana to mark African Day and raise awareness of the Cuban blockade.

=== Counseling and restorative justice ===
Olusanya currently serves as a counselor for Jefferson Parish under the Louisiana state government. He works under the clinical supervision of Camella Grau, LPC-S, integrating evidence-based mental health care with systemic advocacy. His efforts aim to reform justice processes through restorative practices.

== Recognition ==
- Named a top 20 winner of the RUFORUM Young African Entrepreneurs Competition (West Africa, 2019).
- Selected as the youth voice representative from Africa at the Global NDC Conference in Berlin (2019).
