= Zujung =

Coordinates: 9°23′N 0°52′W

Zujung is a community in Tamale Metropolitan District in the Northern Region of Ghana.

== See also ==
- Suburbs of Tamale (Ghana) metropolis
