= Gurugu =

Community in northern Ghana

Gurugu is a community in Sagnarigu Municipal in the Northern Region of Ghana. Its neighboring communities are Jisonaayili, Sognaayili, Kumbuyili and Chogu-Yapalsi.

It is located along the Tamale-Kumbungu road with linear settlement under the leadership of a Chief.

== History ==
Gurugu is located in the traditional lands of the Dagomba people. It is the seat of the paramount chief of the Lingbunga and has been since Ghana's independence in 1957.

== Education ==
- Suburbs of Tamale (Ghana) metropolis
