= Mohammed-Sani Abdulai =

Ghanaian academic and computer scientist

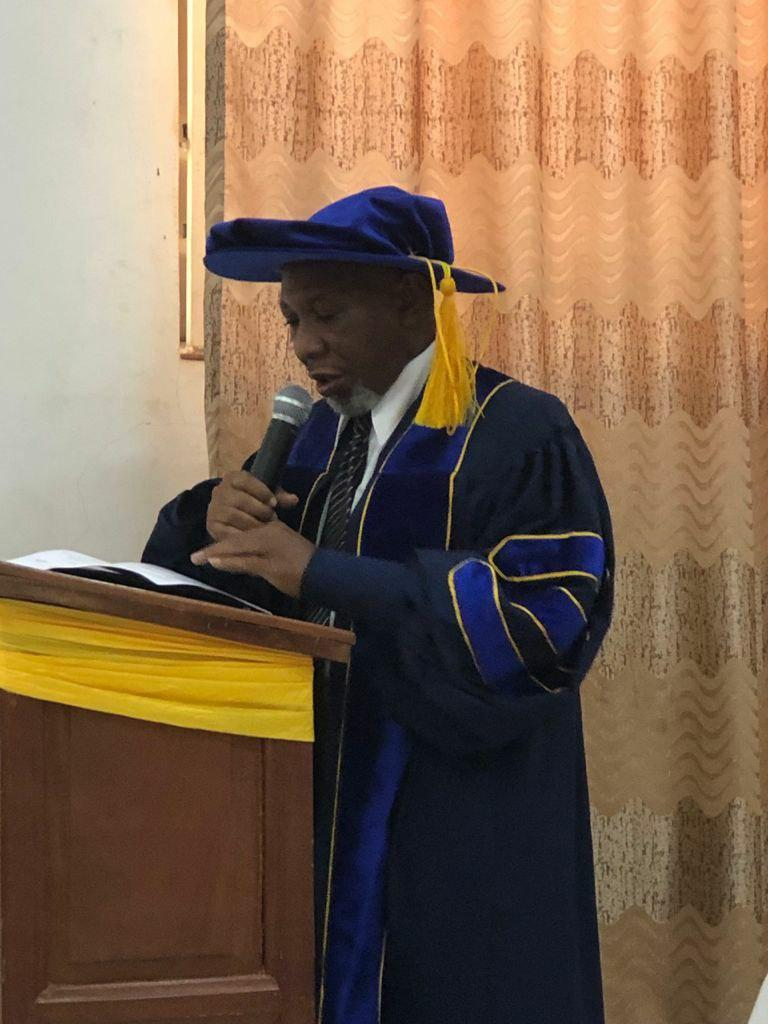
- Born: 2 May 1956 (age 70); Yendi
- Education: University of Cape Coast: Norwegian University of Science and Technology; Korea Advanced Institute of Science and Technology
- Occupation: Computer scientist
- Years active: 1981–present
- Employers: Kaduna Polytechnic; University of Ghana; University of Cape Coast; Islamic University College; Valley View University; Ghana Institute of Management and Public Administration; Ashesi University; Ghana-India Kofi Annan Centre of Excellence in ICT; University of Professional Studies; Lakeside University College
- Organizations: Internet Society; Information Technology Association of Ghana; National Banking College
- Known for: Pioneering role in the development of Internet in Ghana
- Notable work: establishment of the first Cisco Regional Networking Academy in Sub-Saharan Africa in Ghana
- Political party: New Patriotic Party
- Spouse: Zainab Mohammed-Sani
- Children: 5, inc. Jemila Abdulai

Mohammed-Sani Abdulai is a Ghanaian educator and IT professional. He is currently the president of Lakeside University College.

== Early life and education ==
Abdulai was born on 2 May 1956 in Yendi in the Northern region of Ghana. His father Abdulai Adam was a vulcanizer in Tamale and his mother Martha Sandow was a petty trader.

Abdulai gained admission to the then Government Secondary School (now Tamale Senior High School) in 1969 to obtain his SC/GCE Ordinary-Level qualification, which he completed in 1974, majoring in the Sciences. He thereafter proceeded to pursue his GCE Advanced-Level programme at Bawku Senior High School, where he completed in 1976 and obtained his GCE Advanced-Level Certificate in Mathematics, Physics, Economics and General Paper.

Abdulai gained admission to the University of Cape Coast in 1976 and pursued a bachelor's degree in mathematics major and physics minor degree programme, graduating with honours. He also obtained a diploma degree in mathematics education from the same institution, completed in 1980. On completion of his studies in 1980, he was retained as a faculty intern at the Computer Centre of the university, where his interest in information technology began. Abdulai is an alumnus of the Norwegian University of Science and Technology (NTNU) and the Korea Advanced Institute of Science and Technology (KAIST).

== Career ==
Abdulai served on various ICT-related boards and committees in Ghana, including National ICT Policy and Planning and the National Communications Authority. As of August 2017, he was the board chairman for National Information Technology Agency, board member at Environmental Protection Agency, board member and ICT consultant designate at the Ghana Interbank Payment and Settlement System, vice-chair of the board of trustees at the Ghana chapter of Internet Society, and chair of the executive management team of Information Technology Association of Ghana.

He took up lecture positions between 1994 and 2007 at the University of Ghana, National College of Banking, GIMPA and Ashesi University.

Abdulai's interests span advocacy research into technology developmental challenges in Africa. Between 2007 and 2012, he was Director of Research, Innovation and Development at Ghana-India Kofi Annan Centre of Excellence in ICT. He was in charge of Institutional Research, Innovation and Development at two institutions in Ghana: the Madina Institute of Science and Technology and University of Professional Studies. He founded the African Centre For Development Informatics in 2015 as an advisory centre that focuses on leveraging informatics for accelerated development of the African continent.

Abdulai is the head of Information Services and Technology at the Ghana Hajj commission since 2017.

After taking up the role of vice-president at Madina Institute of Science and Technology until 2019, he was thereafter appointed as the president of the institution in 2021. He succeeded Abdulai Salifu Asuro.
