= Chogu-Yapalsi =

Choggu-Yapalsi is a community in Sagnarigu District in the Northern Region of Ghana. It is a nucleated but populated community located along the Tamale-Kumbungu road having Jisonaayili, Gurugu and Choggu Mmanaayili as its immediate neighbors. Choggu-Yapalsi is formally recognized as a distinct community located within the Sagnarigu Municipal District of the Northern Region of Ghana. The modern administration places Choggu-Yapalsi under the Sagnarigu Municipal District Assembly.

== See also ==
- Suburbs of Tamale (Ghana) metropolis
