= Yilonaayili =

Yilonaayili is a community in Tamale Metropolitan District in the Northern Region of Ghana. It is located along the Tamale-Bolgatanga trunk road. The community has nucleated settlement. The people there are predominantly farmers. The women in this community mostly are engaged in trading and shea butter business.

== See also ==
- Kulmanga
