= Mohammad Habibu Tijani =

Ghanaian politician

Member of the Ghana Parliament for Yendi Constituency
- In office 7 January 2013 – 7 January 2021
- Preceded by: Sulemana Ibun Iddrisu
- Succeeded by: Farouk Aliu Mahama

Personal details
- Born: February 16, 1965 (age 61) Yendi, Northern Region
- Party: New Patriotic Party
- Education: University of Ghana; Valley View University; GIMPA
- Profession: Politician; teacher

Mohammad Habibu Tijani is a Ghanaian politician and former member of the Seventh Parliament of the Fourth Republic of Ghana representing the Yendi Constituency in the Northern Region on the ticket of the New Patriotic Party.

== Early life and education ==
Tijani was born on 16 February 1965. He hails from Yendi in the Northern Region of Ghana. He went to Ghana College, now Ghana Senior High School (GHANASCO), Tamale. He received his Teachers' Certificate 'A' in 1989 from the Bagabaga Training College. He later proceeded to the University of Ghana where he obtained his Bachelor of Arts (BA) degree in the Study of Religion with first class honours in 2000. He holds a master's degree in Governance and Leadership from the Ghana Institute of Management and Public Administration (GIMPA) and a post graduate diploma in education which he received in 2016 from Valley View University, Oyibi.

== Career ==
Tijani is a teacher by profession. He was a tutor for Yendi Senior High School 1995 to 1997. and also served as the assistant director in charge of Monitoring and Supervision for Central Gonja District Office of the Ghana Education Service from 2009 to 2013. He is also an Islamic Cleric. Habib Tijani was the Municipal Chief Executive for Yendi from 2001 to 2009.

== Politics ==
Tijani served as the municipal chief executive for Yendi from 2001 to 2009. He entered parliament on 7 January 2013 on the ticket of the New Patriotic Party. He was re-elected in the 2016 Ghanaian general election to represent the Yendi Constituency for a second parliamentary term. In 2017, he was appointed deputy minister for Foreign Affairs. During his time in parliament, he served as member of the Works and Housing and Business and House Committees of Parliament. He has helped his constituents in many ways, including facilitating the following projects:

- Setting up of the Yendi College of Health Sciences in Yendi
- Building of Maternal and Child Health Care Centres in Yendi
- Construction of 37 units of 3 Classroom Blocks in Yendi
- Construction of 13 units of 6 Classroom Blocks in the Yendi Municipality
- Construction of 13 CHPS Compounds in the Yendi Municipality

== Personal life ==
He is married with four children. He identifies as a Muslim.
