= Kogni =

Coordinates: 9.578°N 0.832°W

Kogni is a community in Tamale Metropolitan District in the Northern Region of Ghana.

== See also ==
- Suburbs of Tamale (Ghana) metropolis
