= Russian Bungalows =

Community in Northern Region, Ghana

Russian Bungalows is a community in Tamale Metropolitan District in the Northern Region of Ghana.

== See also ==
- Kalpohini Estates
