= Yagyili =

Community in Tamale metropolis in the Northern Region of Ghana

Coordinates: 9.3253°N 0.8588°W

Yagyili is a community in Tamale Metropolitan District in the Northern Region of Ghana.

== See also ==
- Suburbs of Tamale (Ghana) metropolis
