= Sagnarigu =

Coordinates: 9.4161°N 0.8763°W

Sagnarigu is a community and capital of Sagnarigu District in the Northern Region of Ghana.

== See also ==
- Suburbs of Tamale (Ghana) metropolis
