= Farouk Aliu Mahama =

Ghanaian politician

Hon. Farouk Aliu Mahama
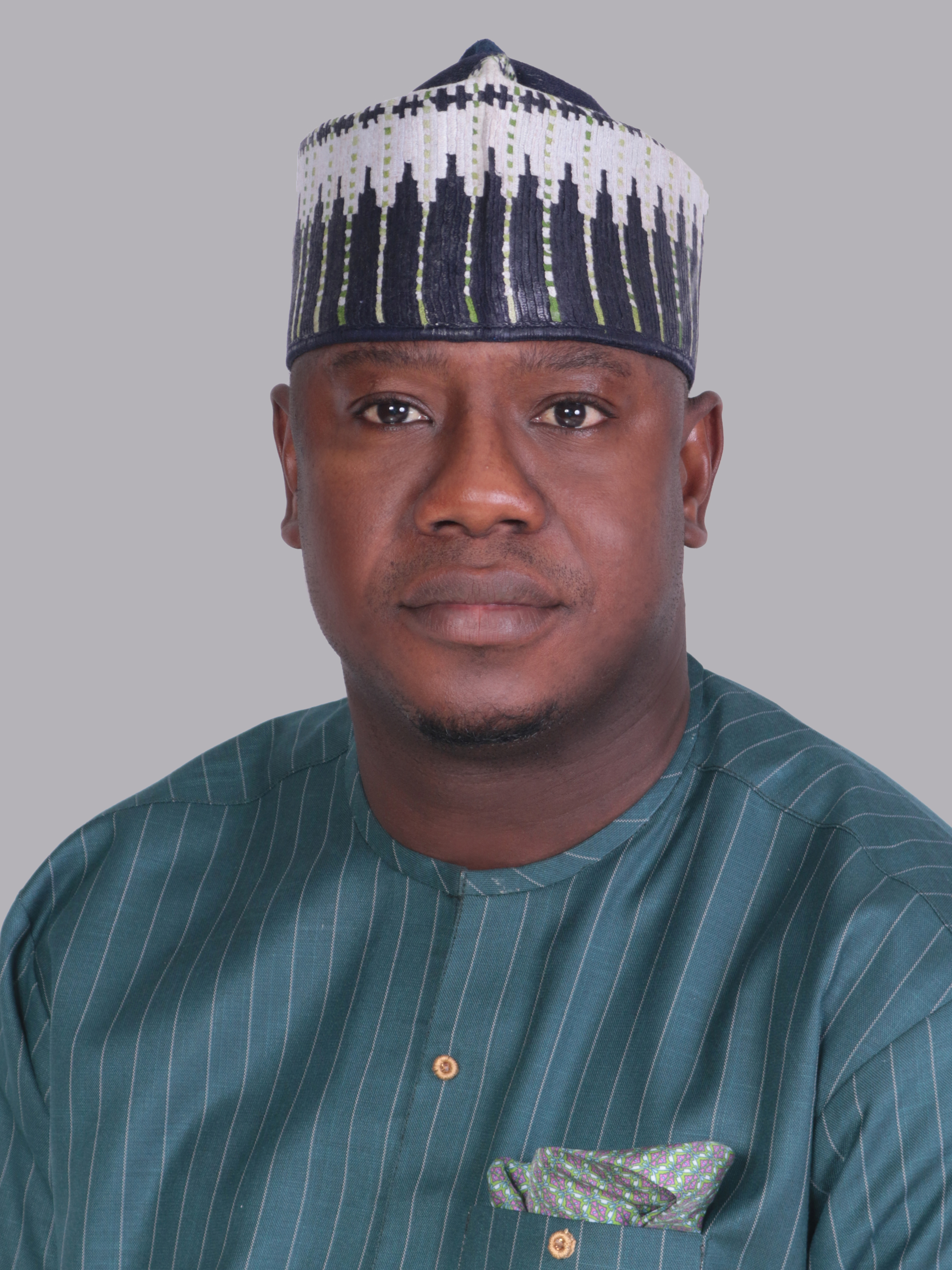

Member of Parliament for Yendi Constituency
- Incumbent
- Assumed office 7 January 2021
- Preceded by: Mohammad Habibu Tijani

Personal details
- Born: 27 April 1981 (age 45)
- Party: New Patriotic Party
- Relations: Aliu Mahama (father); Ramatu Aliu Mahama (mother); Imoru Egala (grandfather)

Umar Farouk Aliu Mahama (born 27 April 1981) is a Ghanaian politician who is a member of the New Patriotic Party (NPP). He is the member of parliament for the Yendi Constituency after winning in the 2020 parliamentary elections.

== Early life and education ==
Mahama had his basic education at Sakasaka Presby Experimental School in Tamale and Achimota schools. He attended secondary school at Prempeh College in Kumasi, Ashanti Region. He then went to Ghana Institute of Management and Public Administration (GIMPA) where he completed with a Bachelor of Science degree in marketing.

Mahama also holds a master's degree in Supply Chain Management from the Coventry University in England, the United Kingdom and he is also certified International Supply Chain Professional which he acquired from the International Purchasing and Supply Chain Management Institute-USA.

Farouk Aliu Mahama has many academic honors to his credit recognizing his professional performance;

- Cambridge University (Institute of Sustainability Leadership)- High Impact Leadership
- Scottish Qualification Authority in procurement integrity from the Scottish Qualification Authority
- Honors in contract management from Ghana Suppliers Commission
- Harvard Kennedy School- Emerging Leaders
- Certified International Supply Chain Professional-IPSCMI-USA
- Certified International Supply Chain Manager-IPSCMI-USA
- Chartered Procurement Member-MCIPS, UK.
- Honors in Procurement of goods and services from World Bank
- World Bank E-Procurement and Implementation from Government of Ghana.
- New procurement Framework by World Bank
- Institute of Supply Chain Management
- Ghana Institute of Management and Public Administration- Bachelor of Science in Marketing
- Coventry University, United Kingdom-Master of Science in Procurement and Supply Chain Management
- Chartered Institute of Procurement and Supply (CIPS)-Corporate Award

== Politics ==
In June 2020, Mahama won in the primaries and was declared as the New Patriotic Party (NPP) Parliamentary Candidate for the Yendi constituency in the Northern Region ahead of the 2020 parliamentary and presidential elections. Mahama was declared winner after polling 244 votes against Abibata Shanni Mahama Zakaria, a Deputy Chief Executive Officer of the Microfinance and Loans Centre (MASLOC) and Baba Daney, a Chartered Accountant who got 210 and 139 votes respectively.

In December 2020, he won the parliamentary elections for the Yendi Constituency. He was declared winner after getting 40,624 votes against his closest contender Alhassan Abdul Fatawu of the National Democratic Congress (NDC) who had 24,755 votes.

Mahama succeeded Mohammed Habib Tijani, Deputy Minister for Foreign Affairs under the Akufo-Addo government, who had been member of parliament since recapturing the seat for the New Patriotic Party in the 2012 elections. Mohammed Habib Tijani for unknown reason decided not to seek re-election in the 2020 polls.

== Career ==
In August 2021, Nana Akufo-Addo appointed Farouk as the board chair of the Ghana Integrated Iron and Steel Corporation. Mahama is chairperson of the Muslim Caucus in Parliament. He is also chairperson of Parliament's Assurance Committee.

== Personal life ==
He is the son of Ghanaian politician and former vice president, the late Aliu Mahama and Hajia Ramatu Mahama. Alhaji Imoro Egala is the maternal grandfather of Farouk Alhaji Farouk Aliu Mahama has two children, Maltiti Aliu Mahama Jr and Nurudeen Mahama with his wife Ayisha Mahama. His father was Ghana’s first Muslim Vice-President and the first and only ethnic Dagomba to have risen to that political height. He is a Muslim.

== Awards ==
He won the Northern Excellence awards as the Most Promising Politician and Northern Business Excellence Awards as the Rising Star of the Year.
