= Salaamba =

Salaamba is a community in Tamale Metropolitan District in the Northern Region of Ghana. It is a less populated community. Most of the inhabitants(men) of the community are farmers and the women are also into shea butter.

== See also ==
- Suburbs of Tamale (Ghana) metropolis
