= Kobilmahagu =

- Suburb
- Country: Ghana
- Region: Northern Region
- District: Tamale Metropolitan District
- Time zone: UTC+0 (GMT)

Kobilmahagu is a community in the Tamale Metropolitan District in the Northern Region of Ghana. It has a multi-ethnic population hosting members most tribes across Ghana, with ethnic Dagomba forming over 90%. Religious and cultural festivities form a major part of the lives of people residing there.

== Origin ==
The term Kobilmahagu means "cold well". This refers to a shallow hand-dug well whose water always appeared, whether in the rainy or dry season. This was believed to exist because beneficiaries of this facility followed the norms religiously. It was forbidden to fetch water from the well with any metal container. Either a calabash or an earthenware container must be used instead.

Some of the occupants of the Kobilmahagu people in order of succession include:

Kobilmahagu
Naa Napabaa
Naa Niendow
Naa Mana
Naa Yakubu
Naa Salifu
Naa Dawuni
Naa Abukari
Naa Jabuni
Naa Abdulai
Naa Alhassan
Naa Alhassani

== Economy ==
Farming is the mainstay of the male population whilst pottery dominates among the females.

== Culture ==
Religious and cultural festivities form a major part of the lives of people residing in Kobilmahagu.

Among other ting bana is the one most used by the ting bihi to seek answers and solutions to problems and challenges, including drought, disease, or mysterious deaths.

Kobilmahagu are gradually adopting the use of public latrines and household latrines, supplanting open defecation.

== See also ==
- Suburbs of Tamale (Ghana) metropolis
