= Dalinbla =

Community in Ghana

Dalinbla is a community in Tamale Metropolitan District in the Northern Region of Ghana.

== See also ==
Education

- Suburbs of Tamale (Ghana) metropolis
