= Gumbihini =

Community in Tamale Metropolitan District, Northern Region, Ghana

Gumbihini (or Gumbehini) is a community in Tamale Metropolitan District in the Northern Region of Ghana.

== See also ==
- Jisonaayili
- Suburbs of Tamale (Ghana) metropolis
