= International University of Management and Administration =

University in Cotonou, Benin

- Institut Universitaire des Métiers d'Avenir
- Type: Management education university
- Established: 2010; 16 years ago
- Location: Cotonou, Benin
- Website: iuma-university.com iuma-danale.net

The International University of Management and Administration (French: Institut Universitaire des Métiers d'Avenir) is a management-education university in Cotonou, Benin. It is recognized by the NUC.

== History ==
The university was founded in 2010.

== Courses ==
The university's accredited courses include:

- Pharmacy
- Accounting
- Business administration
- Hotel and tourism management
- Architecture
- Human biology, nutrition and nursing
- Hospital management
- Computer engineering
- Computer science
- Management information system
- Economics
- Banking and finance
- Marketing
- Political science
- Law
- International relations and European studies
- Finance management
- Mass communication
- French language and linguistics
- Psychology

== See also ==
- Education in Benin
- List of universities in Benin
