= Nyoheni =

Northern regional Ghanan community

Nyoheni is a community in Tamale Metropolitan District in the Northern Region of Ghana. women in this community is well known for trading and some population of the men too farm.

== See also ==
- Suburbs of Tamale (Ghana) metropolis
