= Sugashee =

Sugashee is a community in Sagnarigu District in the Northern Region of Ghana.

== See also ==
- Suburbs of Tamale (Ghana) metropolis
