= Foshegu =

Coordinates: 9°19′N 0°54′W

Foshegu is a community in Tamale Metropolitan District in the Northern Region of Ghana.

== See also ==
- Suburbs of Tamale (Ghana) metropolis
