= Yendi (Ghana parliament constituency) =

Ghana parliament constituency

Coordinates: 9.4395357°N 0.0287963°W

- constituency for the Parliament of Ghana
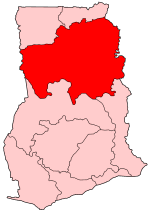
- District: Yendi Municipal District
- Region: Northern Region of Ghana

Current constituency
- Party: National Democratic Congress
- MP: Alhassan Abdul Fatawu

Yendi is one of the constituencies represented in the Parliament of Ghana. It elects one Member of Parliament (MP) by the first past the post system of election. Alhassan Abdul Fatawu is the member of parliament for the constituency. It is located in the Northern Region of Ghana.

Sulemana Ibun Iddrisu represented the constituency in the 5th Parliament of the Fourth Republic of Ghana. He was elected on the ticket of the National Democratic Congress (NDC) and won a majority of 617 votes more than candidate closest in the race, to win the constituency. He succeeded Malik Al-Hassan Yakubu who had represented the constituency in parliament from 1997 to 2009 on the ticket of the New Patriotic Party (NPP). Mohammed Habib Tijani of the New Patriotic Party succeeded Ibun Iddrisu, when he won against him in the 2012 Elections.

The MP for the Yendi Constituency in the 8th Parliament of Ghana was Farouk Aliu Mahama of the New Patriotic Party. He was elected on December 7, 2020, and got sworn into office, a month later on 7 January, 2021.

== Members of Parliament ==
First elected	Member	Party
Created 1992
1996	Malik Al-Hassan Yakubu	New Patriotic Party
2000	Malik Al-Hassan Yakubu	New Patriotic Party
2004	Malik Al-Hassan Yakubu	New Patriotic Party
2008	Sulemana Ibun Iddrisu	National Democratic Congress
2012	Mohammad Habibu Tijani	New Patriotic Party
2016	Mohammad Habibu Tijani	New Patriotic Party
2020	Farouk Aliu Mahama	New Patriotic Party

== Elections ==
The following table shows the parliamentary election results for Yendi constituency during the 1996 Ghanaian general election.

1996 Ghanaian parliamentary election: Yendi Source:Ghana Home Page
Party	Candidate	Votes	%	±%
New Patriotic Party	Alhaji Malik Al- Hassan Yakubu	13,743	47.60	—
National Democratic Congress	Sulemana Ibun Iddrisu	7,107	24.60	—
People's National Convention	Nalari Nyoja John	2, 150	7.50	—
Majority		13, 743	47.60	—

The below table shows the parliamentary election results for Yendi constituency in the 2000 Ghanaian general election.

2000 Ghanaian parliamentary election: Yendi Source:Ghana Home Page
Party	Candidate	Votes	%	±%
New Patriotic Party	Malik Al-Hassan Yakubu	10,620	47.70	—
National Democratic Congress	Issah A. Bukari	8,528	38.30	—
Convention People's Party	Issifu Sumani	2,490	11.20	—
NRP	Mohammed A.Y Nambili	409	1.80	—
People's National Convention	Mohammed A.D Nasser	165	0.70	—
UGM	Abdulai Bawa	52	0.20	—
Majority		10,620	47.70	—

The table below shows the parliamentary election results for Yendi constituency during the 2004 Ghanaian general election.

2004 Ghanaian parliamentary election: Yendi Source:Ghana Home Page
Party	Candidate	Votes	%	±%
New Patriotic Party	Malik Al-Hassan Yakubu	15,302	53.50	—
National Democratic Congress	Sulemana Ibun Iddrisu	10,779	37.70	—
People's National Convention	Nalari Nyoja John	2, 500	8.70	—
IND	Zuututugri Mubarak Abdallah	00	0.00	—
Majority		15,302	53.50	—

The following table shows the parliamentary election results for Yendi constituency during the 2008 Ghanaian general election.

2008 Ghanaian parliamentary election: Yendi Source:Ghana Home Page
Party	Candidate	Votes	%	±%
National Democratic Congress	Sulemana Ibun Iddrisu	10,831	49.08	—
New Patriotic Party	Malik Al-Hassan Yakubu	10,214	46.29	—
DFP	Alhassan Sulemana Danladi	748	3.39	—
Convention People's Party	Amadu Abukari	156	0.71	—
People's National Convention	Salifu Umar Wuninmi	118	0.53	—
IND	Abukari M. Mahamud	0	0.00	—
IND	Zuututugri Mubarak Abdallah	0	0.00	—
Majority		10,831	49.08	—

The table below shows the parliamentary election results for Yendi constituency in the 2012 Ghanaian general election.

2012 Ghanaian parliamentary election: Yendi Source:Ghana Home Page
Party	Candidate	Votes	%	±%
New Patriotic Party	Mohammad Habibu Tijani	22,961	46.75	—
National Democratic Congress	Sulemana Ibun Iddrisu	14,228	28.97	—
IND	Abdul Rahaman M Mawong Gbande	5, 950	12.11	—
IND	Abukari Mohammed Mahamoud	5, 582	11.37	—
Progressive People's Party	M A Yussif Nambili	286	0.58	—
IND	Shani Mohammed Kamil	106	0.22	—
Majority		22,961	46.97	—

The following table shows the parliamentary election results for Yendi constituency during the 2016 Ghanaian general election.

2016 Ghanaian parliamentary election: Yendi Source:Ghana Home Page
Party	Candidate	Votes	%	±%
New Patriotic Party	Mohammad Habibu Tijani	27,158	52.18	—
National Democratic Congress	Yahaya Hamza Alikali	23,964	46.04	—
Progressive People's Party	Wumbei Ugan	737	1.42	—
People's National Convention	Andani Abdul Latif	186	0.36	—
Majority		27,158	52.18	—

The below table shows the parliamentary election results for Yendi constituency in the 2020 Ghanaian general election.

2020 Ghanaian general election: Yendi Source:Ghana Home Page
Party	Candidate	Votes	%	±%
New Patriotic Party	Farouk Aliu Mahama	40,624	62.14	—
National Democratic Congress	Alhassan Abdul Fataw	24,755	37.86	—
Majority		40, 624	62.14	—

== See also ==
- List of Ghana Parliament constituencies
