= Zibogo =

Coordinates: 9.371°N 0.742°W

Zibogo is a community in Tamale Metropolitan District in the Northern Region of Ghana. A large population of this community people are farmers.

== See also ==
- Suburbs of Tamale (Ghana) metropolis
