= Kalpohin =

Community in Northern Region, Ghana

- Town
- Country: Ghana
- Region: Northern Region
- District: Tamale Metropolitan District

Population
  - Total: —
- Time zone: GMT
  - Summer (DST): GMT

Kalpohin is a community in Tamale Metropolitan District in the Northern Region of Ghana.

== Institutions ==
- Kalpohin Senior High School
- Kalpohin Anglican

== Notable native ==
- Ramatu Aliu Mahama

== See also ==
- Suburbs of Tamale (Ghana) metropolis
