= Jisonaayili =

Community in Ghana

Coordinates: 9°27′11.35″N 0°51′28.14″W

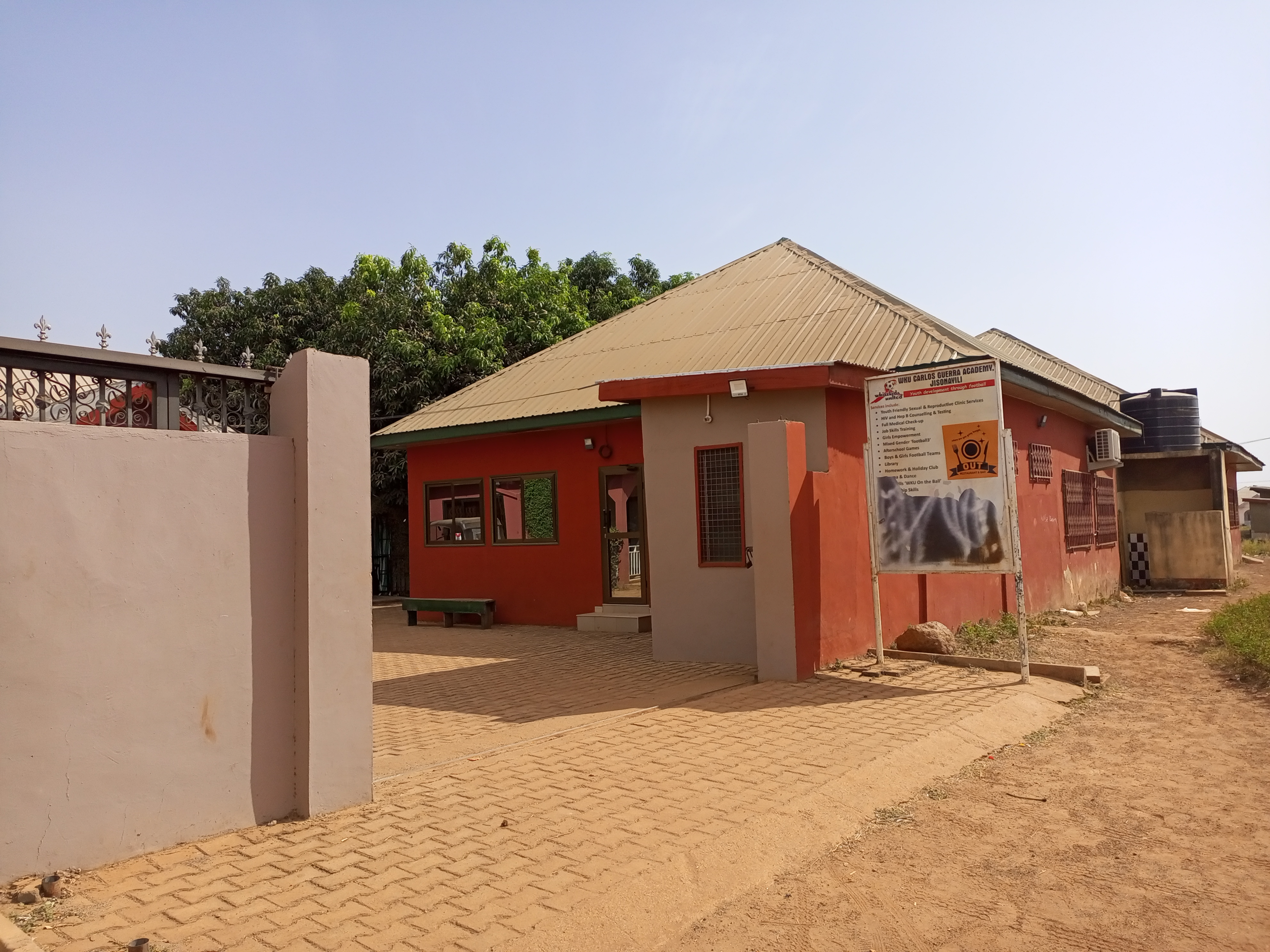
Jisonaayili community library

Jisonaayili (or Jisonayili) is a community in Sagnarigu District in the Northern Region of Ghana. It is a linear settlement concentrated along the Jisonayili Road that divides the community into two halves. The immediate neighboring communities include Kanvili, Gurugu, Chogu-Yapalsi and Kamina Barracks. The community is served by a public library located in the Jisonaayili Community Center. The community is currently under the Sagnarigu Constituency and represented in Ghana's Parliament by the Hon. Atta Issah.

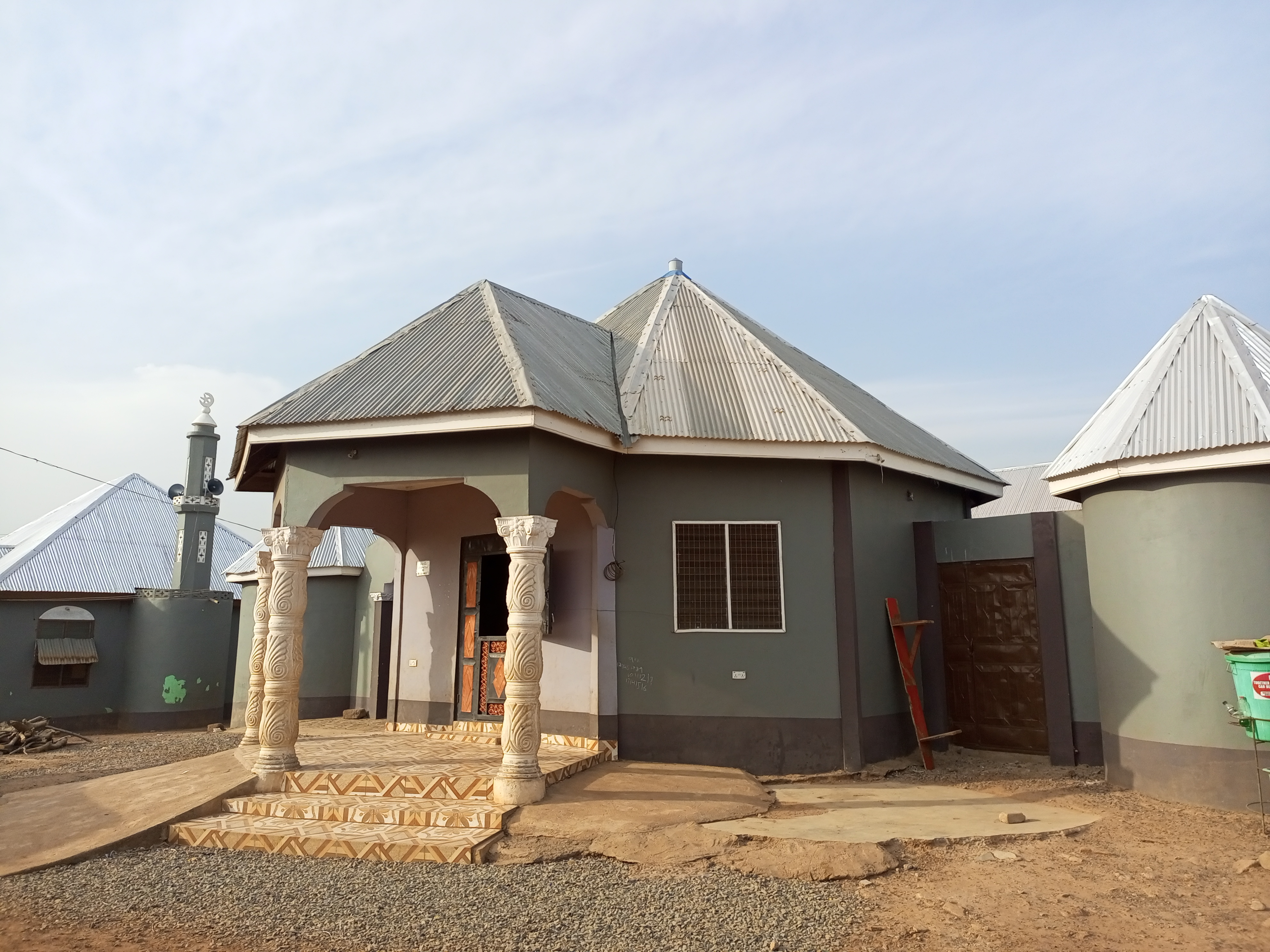
Jisonayili Chief Palace

The community is under the leadership of a local chief enskinned by the main chief of Tamale (Gukpenaa). The present chief of Jisonaayili (2015), Alhaji Alhassan Abu, was installed in February 2015 after his predecessor (Bomaha-naa Mahamadu) died in 2012.

== See also ==
- Kamina Barracks
