= Bogkurugu =

Bogkurugu is a community in Tamale Metropolitan District in the Northern Region of Ghana.

The Tamale Metropolitan District, where Bogkurugu is located, had an estimated population of about 374,744 people as of the 2021 census. The Tamale Metropolis consists of many communities, including urban, peri‑urban and rural settlements spread across its area in the Northern Region of Ghana.

== See also ==
- Suburbs of Tamale (Ghana) metropolis
