= Gbanyamli =

Gbanyamni is a community in Tamale Metropolitan District in the Northern Region of Ghana. It is a less populated community. The inhabitants of the community are predominantly farmers.

== See also ==
- Suburbs of Tamale (Ghana) metropolis
