= Kulmanga =

Kulmanga is a community in Sagnarigu District in the Northern Region of Ghana.

== See also ==
- Golinga
