= Jemila Abdulai =

Ghanaian blogger and writer

Jemila Wumpini Abdulai
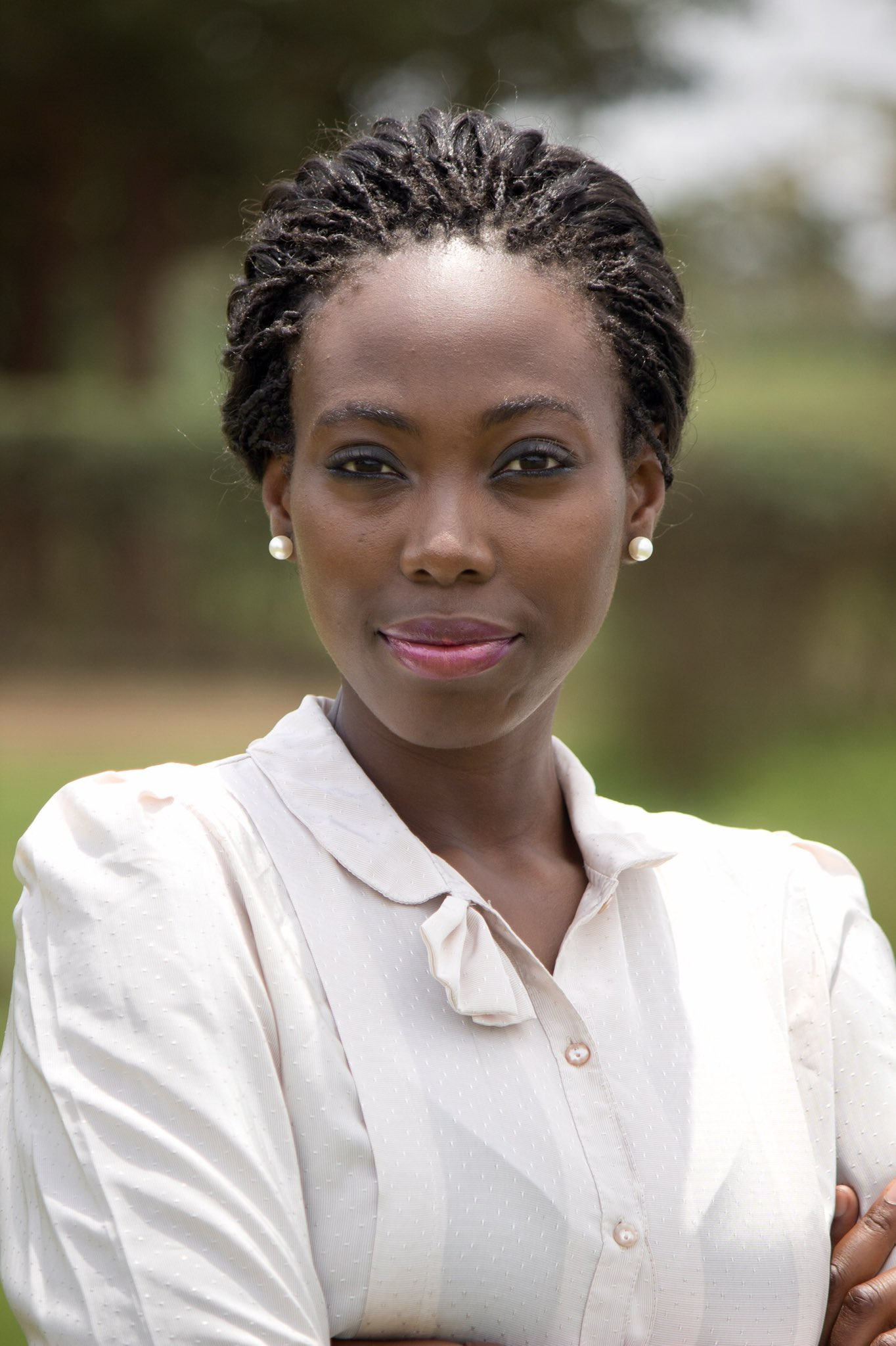
- Jemila Abdulai portrait image
- Born: Jemila Wumpini Abdulai
- Education: Mount Holyoke College, Johns Hopkins University
- Occupations: Blogger, writer, digital marketer
- Relatives: Mohammed-Sani Abdulai
- Website: circumspecte.com

Jemila Wumpini Abdulai is a Ghanaian blogger, writer and digital marketer. In 2007, she founded Circumspecte.com, a lifestyle blog dedicated to Africans. Her blog was a recipient of the African Blogger Awards in 2016.

In 2015, Abdulai's short story "#Yennenga" was included in the Caine Prize Anthology 2015 book, Lusaka Punk and Other Stories. The book included 16 other short stories by African authors.

== Personal life ==
Abdulai is the daughter of Mohammed-Sani Abdulai, the vice president of Madina Institute of Science and Technology, Accra.

== Education ==
Abdulai had her secondary education at Wesley Girls' High School in Cape Coast, Ghana, and graduated from Mount Holyoke College in Massachusetts, USA where she double majored in Economics and French.

She earned a Master of Arts degree in International Economics and International Relations from the Johns Hopkins University SAIS in Washington DC, USA.

== Advocacy ==
She is an advocate for women's rights in Ghana, and also vocal on social media, on topics concerning technology, women's empowerment, and national development. Abdulai is the organiser of #SisterhoodMatters, an annual event in Ghana that celebrates African women and creates conversations about women's health and wellbeing.

In 2016, Abdulai, as the social media lead of BloggingGhana, a group of Ghanaian bloggers, helped in the collation and dissemination of non-partisan news on Ghana's 2016 General Elections via social media. This was under the initiative "Ghana Decides." Abdulai stated that the group's goal was to present an unbiased view of the elections: "Traditional media in Ghana has a reputation for being politicized, particularly during elections. That's why social media initiatives like Ghana Decides are important."

Abdulai was one of the speakers at TEDxAccraWomen conference held on 28 October 2016 in Accra, Ghana.
