= Kootingli =

Community in Tamale, Ghana

Kootingli is a community in Tamale Metropolitan District in the Northern Region of Ghana.

== See also ==
- Suburbs of Tamale (Ghana) metropolis
