= Yongduuni =

Yong-duuni is a community in Sagnarigu District in the Northern Region of Ghana. It is a less populated community. The inhabitants of the community are predominantly farmers and the women are also into Shea butter production. It has a settlement population of two thousand(2000),2020.

== See also ==
- Suburbs of Tamale (Ghana) metropolis
