= Nyeshie =

Coordinates: 9°31′N 0°50′W

Nyeshie is a community in Tamale Metropolitan District in the Northern Region of Ghana.

== See also ==
- Suburbs of Tamale (Ghana) metropolis
