= Sognaayili =

- Country: Ghana
- District: Sagnarigu District

Sognaayili is a community in Sagnarigu District in the Northern Region of Ghana. It is a less populated community with nucleated settlements. A large portion of men in the community are farmers while rest work with livestock and poultry production.

== See also ==
- Suburbs of Tamale (Ghana) metropolis
