= Wamale =

Wamale is a community in Tamale Metropolitan District in the Northern Region of Ghana. This community is said to have water shortage at most times and the women in this community are mostly traders.

== See also ==
- Suburbs of Tamale (Ghana) metropolis
