= Doboagshie =

Doboagshie is a community in Tamale Metropolitan District in the Northern Region of Ghana.

== History ==
Doboagshie is native Dagomba community in the Dagbong Kingdom. It is mostly dominated by Dagombas and they are known for farming.

== Neighboring Communities ==
Vitting, Dabokpaa, Kakpagyili, Yong and Yong Duuni.

== See also ==
- Suburbs of Tamale (Ghana) metropolis
