= Lahagu =

Community in the Northern Region of Ghana

Coordinates: 9°20′N 0°44′W

Lahagu is a community in Tamale Metropolitan District in the Northern Region of Ghana.

== See also ==
- Suburbs of Tamale (Ghana) metropolis
