= Imoru Egala =

Ghanaian politician and educationist

Alhaji Imoru Egala

Minister for Industries
- In office 1965 – 24 February 1966
- President: Kwame Nkrumah
- Succeeded by: Coup d'état

Minister for Information
- In office 1962–1965
- President: Kwame Nkrumah
- Preceded by: Tawia Adamafio
- Succeeded by: Nathaniel Azarco Welbeck

Minister for External Affairs
- In office 1960–1961
- President: Kwame Nkrumah
- Preceded by: Ebenezer Ako-Adjei
- Succeeded by: Ebenezer Ako-Adjei

Minister for Health
- In office 1954–??
- Monarch: Queen Elizabeth II
- Prime Minister: Kwame Nkrumah
- Governor: Charles Arden-Clarke

Member of the Ghana Parliament for Tumu
- In office 1954–1966
- Monarch: Queen Elizabeth II
- Governor General: Noble Arden-Clarke
- Prime Minister: Kwame Nkrumah
- Succeeded by: coup d'état
- Parliamentary group: CPP

Personal details
- Born: 5 December 1916 Tamale, Ghana
- Died: 1 April 1981 (aged 64) Accra, Ghana
- Party: People's National Party
- Other political affiliations: Convention People's Party
- Spouse(s): Hajia Amina Egala, Hajia Memuna Egala, Hajia Adisa Egala and Susie Egala.
- Profession: Educationist, Teacher
- Founder of the People's National Party

Alhaji Imoru Egala (5 December 1916 – 1 April 1981) was a Ghanaian politician and educationist. He held various positions in government in the Gold Coast and after independence of Ghana. He was the foreign minister of Ghana in the First Republic between 1960 and 1961.

== Work and politics ==
=== Minister of state (Nkrumah Government) ===
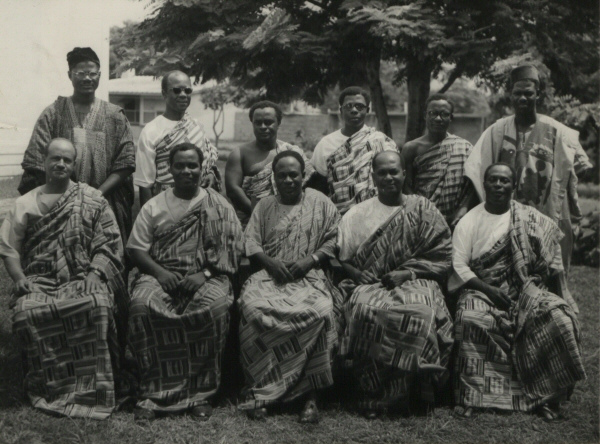
First cabinet of Kwame Nkrumah in 1954 Standing (L to R): J. H. Allassani, N.A. Welbeck, Kofi Asante Ofori-Atta, Ebenezer Ako-Adjei, J.E. Jantuah, Imoru Egala Sitting (L to R): A. Casely-Hayford, Kojo Botsio, Kwame Nkrumah, Komla Agbeli Gbedemah, E.O. Asafu-Adjaye;

He was a member of the Convention People's Party. He held various cabinet posts under Dr. Kwame Nkrumah's Convention People's Party government, including Minister for Foreign Affairs and Minister for Information. He also held the position of Minister of Health and Minister of Industries at a point in time in the Kwame Nkrumah's Convention People's Party government.

Along with serving as minister in different roles at different period in Kwame Nkrumah's administration, he also served a member of parliament for the Tumu Constituency.

After the coup d'etat by Colonel E. Kotoka and Major Afrifa in 1966, Egala who was a well known associate of Kwame Nkrumah and a key member of his Nkrumah regime, was jailed by the military.

=== People's National Party ===
Egala was also a founder of the People's National Party a political party which claimed to represent and continue the Nkrumah Heritage. The People's National Party which won the 1979 presidential and parliamentary elections. He sponsored the candidacy of Dr. Hilla Limann, who became the president of the Third Republic of Ghana, because he was then serving a 12-year ban from public office in Ghana.

In January 1980, Egala began a court process against the electoral commissioner seeking redress of the court to restore his eligibility for public office.

== Personal life ==
Alhaji Imoru Egala had four wives; Hajia Amina Egala, Hajia Memuna Egala, Hajia Adisa Egala and Susie Egala along with 12 children; three boys (Idris Egala, Dramani Egala and Osman Egala) and nine daughters (Zainabu Egala, Fati Egala, Rahinatu Egala, Ramatu Egala, Abiba Egala, Meri Egala, Zalia Egala, Fatima Egala and Rabi Egala).

Imoru is the maternal grandfather of Farouk Aliu Mahama.

== Death ==
Alhaji Imoru Egala died on 1 April 1981 in Accra, Ghana.

Political offices
Preceded by Ebenezer Ako-Adjei	Foreign Minister; 1960 – 1961	Succeeded by Ebenezer Ako-Adjei
Preceded by Tawia Adamafio	Minister for Information; 1962 – 1965	Succeeded by Nathaniel Azarco Welbeck
Preceded by ?	Minister for Industries; 1965	Succeeded by ?
