= Golinga =

Human settlement in Ghana

Coordinates: 9°21′N 0°57′W

Golinga is a community in Tolon District in the Northern Region of Ghana.

== See also ==
- Suburbs of Tolon District
