= Changnaayili =

Community in Ghana

Changnaayili is a community in Tamale Metropolitan District in the Northern Region of Ghana.

== See also ==
- Suburbs of Sagnarigu (Ghana) municipal<Abdul></Lathiiph>
