= Kamina Barracks =

Kamina Barracks (6th Battalion of Infantry; 6Bn) is a settlement in Tamale for personnel of the Northern Regional Command of the Ghana Army branch of the Ghana Armed Forces. It was named after Kamina Funkstation; a short-wave radio transmitter in the German-occupied colony of Togoland (now Togo) in West Africa.

== See also ==
- Barwah Barracks
