= Malishegu =

Malishegu is a nucleated farming community located along the Tamale-Kumbungu trunk road in Tamale Metropolitan District in the Northern Region of Ghana. It is home to Malshegu Sacred Grove - a religious center and one of the last remaining closed canopy forests in the savannah regions of West Africa.

== Boundaries ==
The boundaries of Malshegu, a community in northern Ghana are, Kumbuyili, Gumo, Zag’yuri and yong’duuni.

== See also ==
- Suburbs of Tamale (Ghana) metropolis
