= Lingbunga =

Coordinates: 9.646°N 1.211°W

Lingbunga is a community in Tolon District in the Northern Region of Ghana.

== See also ==
- Suburbs of Tolon District
