= Kpalsi =

Kpalsi is a community in Sagnarigu Municipality in the Northern Region of Ghana.
