= Lakeside University College =

Private nonprofit university in Accra, Ghana

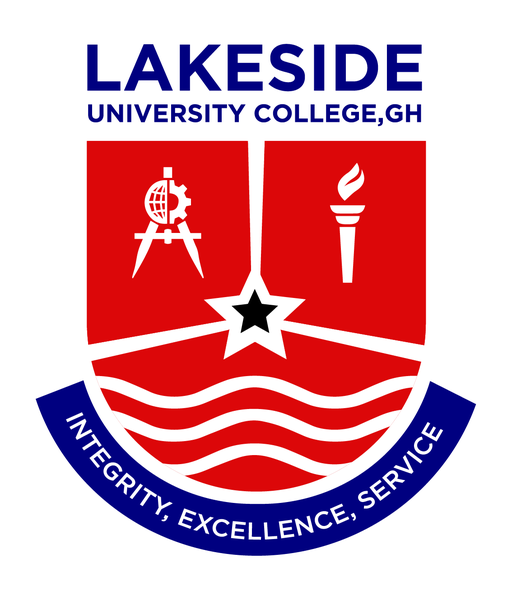
- Motto: Learn Here, Lead Everywhere
- Type: Private Institution
- Established: 2013; 13 years ago
- Affiliations: Kwame Nkrumah University of Science and Technology
- Academic affiliations: University for Development Studies
- President: Mohammed-Sani Abdulai
- Location: Accra, Ghana
- Language: English
- Website: www.lucg.edu.gh
- Data as of 2019

Lakeside University College, Ghana (LUCG) (formerly, Madina Institute of Science and Technology(MIST)) is a private nonprofit university in Accra, Ghana. It was established by the Madina Foundation for Science & Technology (MFST) in 2013.

== Organisation ==
The university has three schools:

=== School Of Engineering ===
- Civil Engineering (BSc)
- Mechanical Engineering (BSc)
- Oil and Gas Engineering (BSc)

=== School Of Business and Technology ===
==== Business Administration ====
- Banking and Finance (BSc)
- Marketing (BSc)
- Accounting (BSc)
- Human Resource Management (BSc)

=== School of Arts ===
- Arabic Language Education (BA)
- Computer Science (BA)
- Information Technology (diploma)

== Affiliations ==
- Kwame Nkrumah University of Science and Technology (KNUST)
- University for Development Studies
- Appiah-Menka University of Skills Training and Entrepreneurial Development
