= ISFOP Benin University =

Private university in Cotonou, Benin

Institut supérieur de formation professionnelle
- University of Professional Studies
- Motto: Quality, Rigour, Success
- Type: Private University
- Established: 1997; 29 years ago
- Vice-Chancellor: Professor Marius Thomas Dakpogan
- Location: CNSS NO. INSAE2978030214760 - IFU32008000176115. 01BP 1206 Cotonou Benin Republic, Cotonou, Benin
- Campus: Urban
- Website: isfopbeninuniversity.edu.bj

Institut Supérieur de Formation Professionnelle (ISFOP) is a private University at Cotonou, Benin, established by the ISFOP Educational Foundation. They offer courses on Language, Communication, Business Administration and Management, Computer Science, Sociology and International Relation and Diplomacy. As at 2018, the President of the University was Professor Maurice Dakpogan.

== Notable alumni ==
- Edmund Daukoru, Former Nigerian Minister of State for Energy. Received an honorary Ph.D from ISFOP Benin University.
