= Tamale-Bolgatanga Highway =

Highway in Ghana

The Tamale-Bolgatanga Highway is the main road connecting the city of Tamale to the city of Bolgatanga, the capital of the Bolgatanga Municipal District, Ghana. Towns located on the highway include Savelugu, Pong-Tamale, Diare, Nasiya, Wale wale, and Tongo.
