= Sulemana Ibun Iddrisu =

Ghanaian politician (born 1955)

Sulemana Ibun Iddrisu (born September 30, 1955) is a Ghanaian politician and a social worker. He is also a former regional director of NADMO and an Ecowas International Election Observer. Iddrisu is a member of the 5th parliament of the 4th republic of Ghana for the Yendi constituency as a representative of the new patriotic party.

== Early life and education ==
Iddrisu was born in September 1955 and hails from Yendi in the northern Region of Ghana.He studied political science at the University of Delhi and obtained a Bachelor of Arts degree in 1982. He then proceeded to obtained a master's degree in political science at the said university in 1984.

== Politics ==
Iddrisu is a member of the 5th parliament of the 4th republic of Ghana and a representative of the national democratic congress. His political career began in 2004 where he contested as a member of parliament for the Yendi Constituency and lost to a candidate of the new patriotic party. He contested again the 2008 elections and won this time around with a total number of 10831 of the total votes cast. Iddrisu lost his seat to Mohammed Tijani of the national democratic congress in the 2012 elections.

== Personal life ==
Iddrisu is a Muslim and married with four children.
