= Sagnarigu Municipal District =

Municipal District in Northern Region, Ghana

- Municipal District
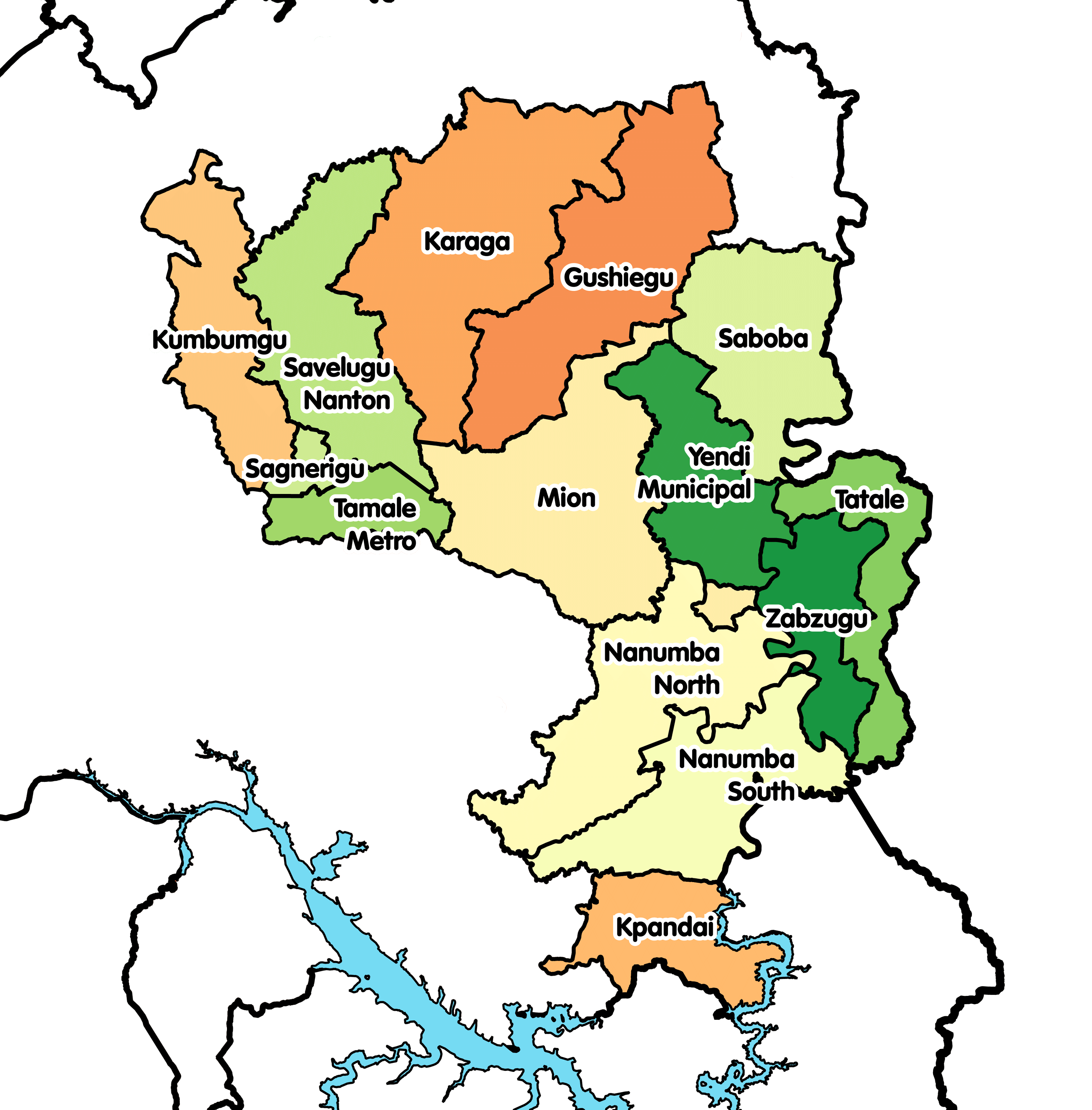
- Districts of Northern Region

- Location of Sagnarigu Municipal District within Northern
- Coordinates: 9°25′21.72″N 0°53′26.88″W
- Country: Ghana
- Region: Northern
- Capital: Sagnarigu

Government
  - Municipal Chief Executive: Hon. Abdulai Imoro Gong

Population (2021)
  - Total: 341,711
- Time zone: UTC+0 (GMT)
- ISO 3166 code: GH-NP-SG

Sagnarigu Municipal District is one of the sixteen districts in the Northern Region of Ghana. Originally it was part of the then-larger Tamale Municipal District, created in 1988. A small northern part of the Tamale Municipal District was split off to create Sagnarigu District on 24 June 2012, while the remaining part has been retained as the Tamale District. Later, on 15 March 2018, Sagnarigu District was elevated to municipal district assembly status to become Sagnarigu Municipal District. The municipality is located in the northwest part of Northern Region and has Sagnarigu as its capital city. Meanwhile, Tamale remains the capital city of the Northern Region as a whole.

Abdulai Imoro Gong is the Municipal Chief Executive of Sagnarigu Municipality in Ghana's Northern Region.

== Communities ==
The communities include:

- Sagnarigu
- Kpalsi
- Sanarigu Kukuo
- Gurugu
- Katariga
- Malishegu
- Choggu Yapalsi
- Jisonayili
- Sogunayili
- Gbolo
- Kumbuyili
- Chagnaayili
- Nyerizee
- Taha
- Gumani
- Education Ridge
- Kulmanga
