= Tamale Metropolitan District =

Tamale Metropolitan Assembly
- Metropolitan District
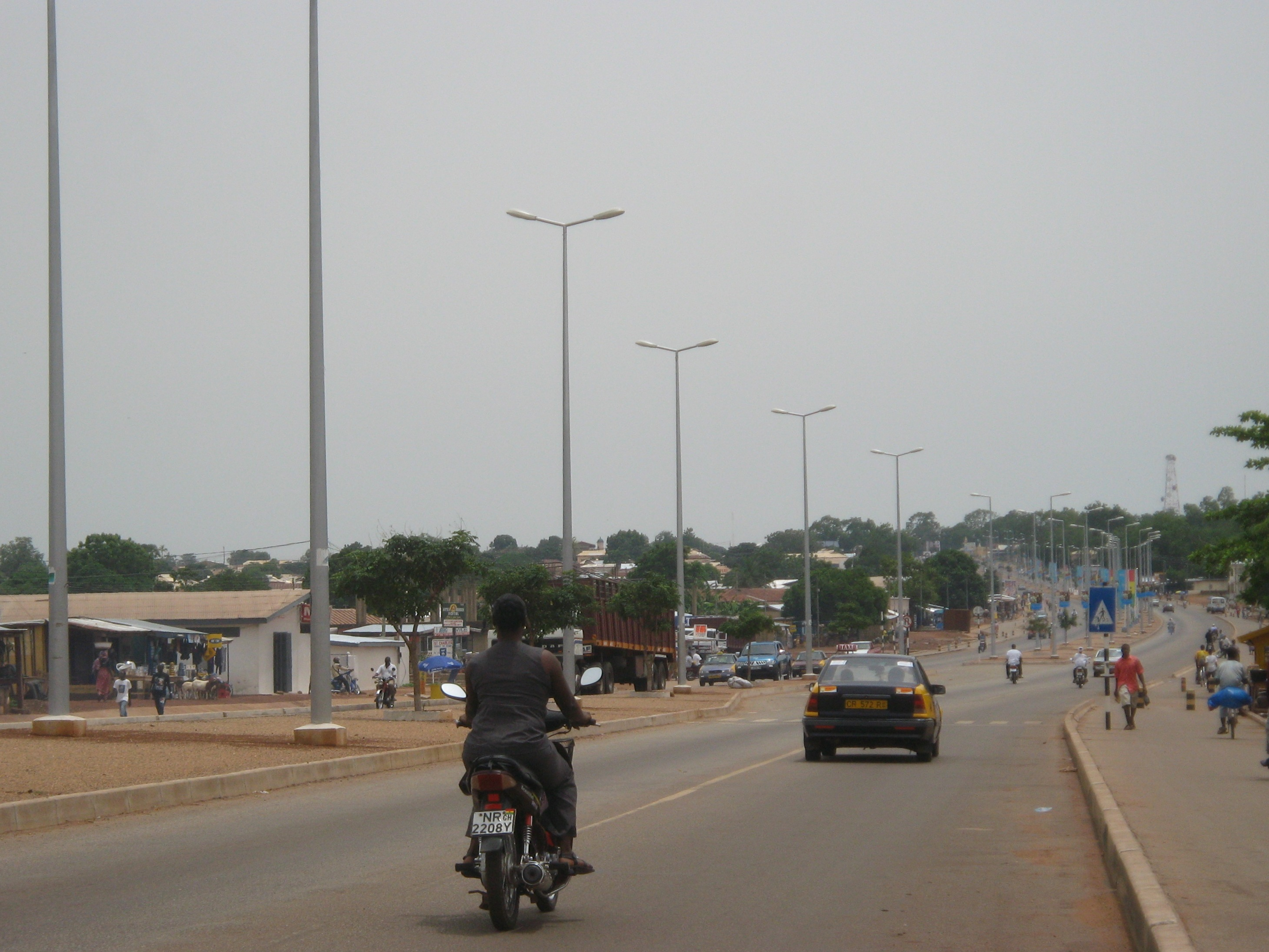
- View of high street in Tamale, Tamale Metropolitan District

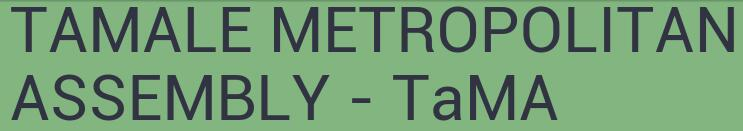
- Seal
- Nickname: <sm>TaMA</sm>
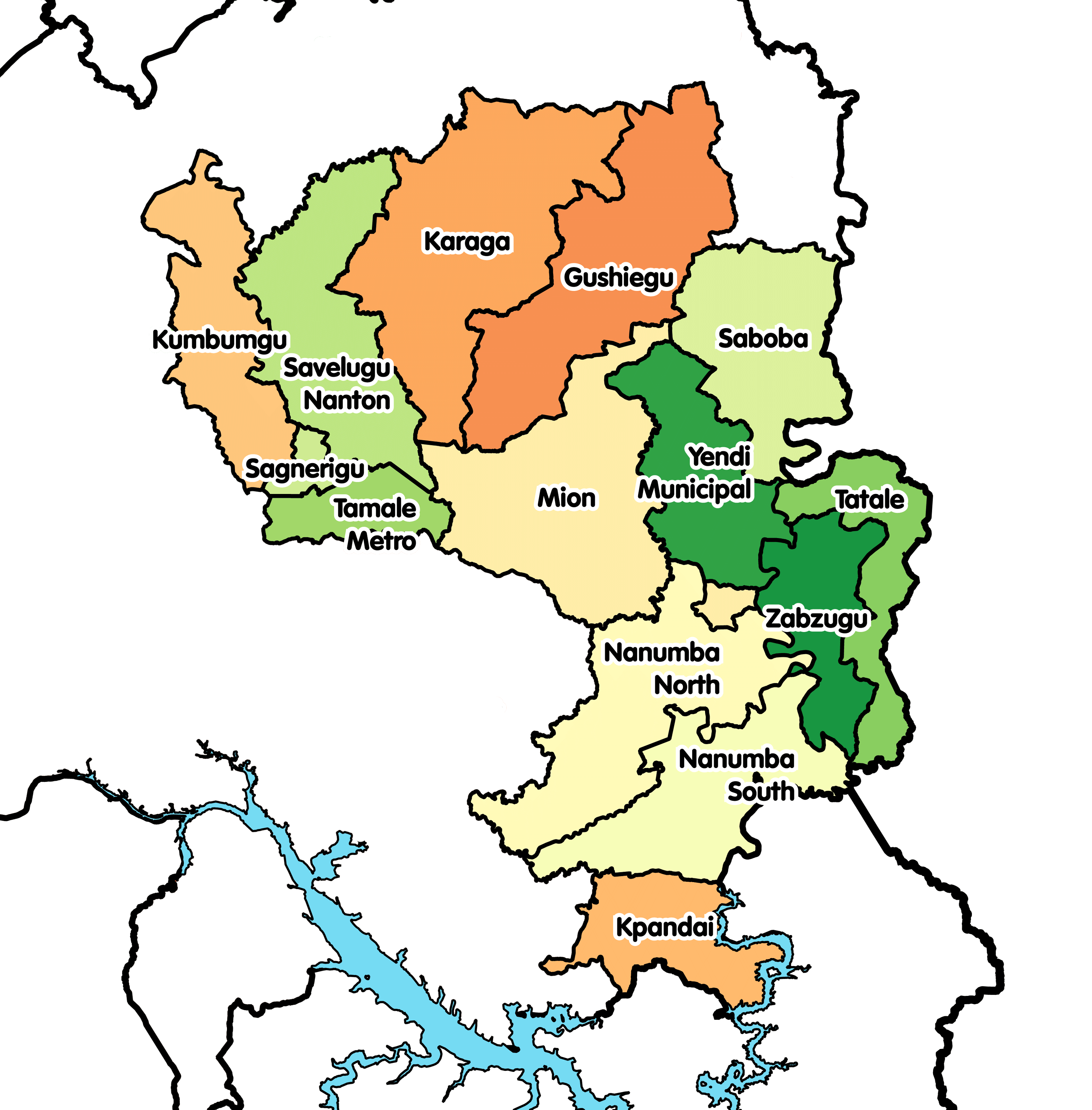
- Districts of Northern Region

- Location of Tamale Metropolitan District within Northern
- Coordinates: 9°24′30.1″N 0°50′25.63″W
- Country: Ghana
- Region: Northern
- Capital: Tamale

Government
  - Metropolitan Chief Executive: Hon. Sule Salifu

Area
  - Total: 731 km^{2} (282 sq mi)

Population (2021)
  - Total: 374,744
- Time zone: UTC+0 (GMT)
- ISO 3166 code: GH-NP-TA

Tamale Metropolitan District is one of the sixteen districts in the Northern Region of Ghana. It was originally established in 1988 as Tamale Municipal District, a municipal district assembly that was created from the former West Dagomba District Council. In August 2004, it was elevated to metropolitan district assembly status. Later, on 24 June 2012, a small northern part of the district was split off to create Sagnarigu District (which was elevated to municipal district assembly status on 15 March 2018 and became Sagnarigu Municipal District); the remaining part has been retained as Tamale Metropolitan District. The district is located in the northwest part of Northern Region and has Tamale as its capital city (which is also the capital city of the Northern Region). The city is the central business hub of the region.

== Demographics ==
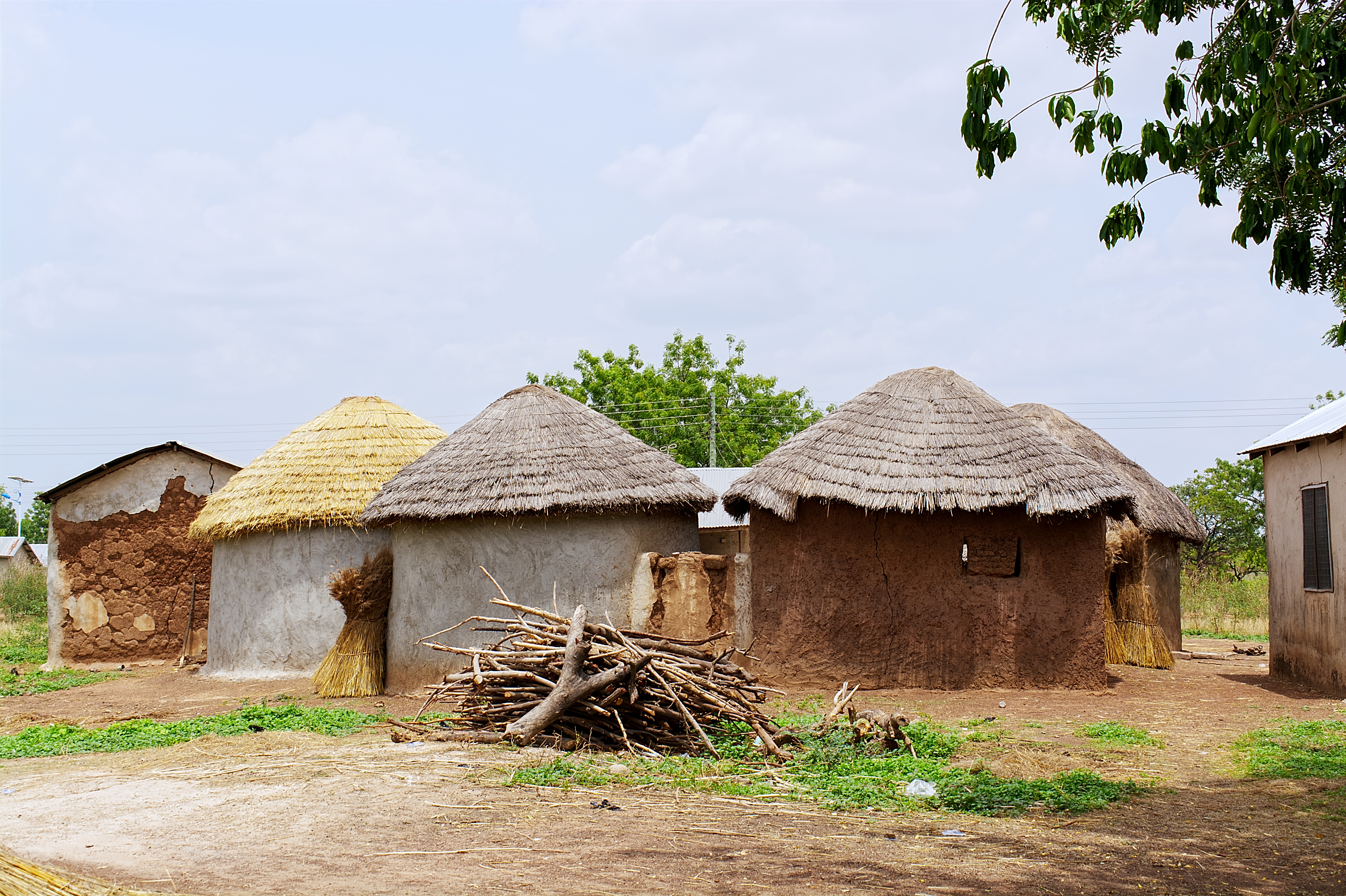
Clay house compound in the rural area

Tamale Metropolitan District had a population of about 233,252 as of 2010. The population living in urban localities (80.08%) is higher than that living in rural localities (19.1%). The number of women is also higher than the number of men.

== Communities ==
- Bangyili
- Batanyili
- Belpiela
- Bogkurugu
- Bukpomo
- Chaanshegu
- Changnaayili
- Checko
- Cheshei
- Chogo-manayili
- Dalinbla
- Dalogyili
- Damankunyili
- Dimala
- Doboagshie
- Dohinaayili
- Dohinni
- Dufaa
- Dugshegu
- Dungu-Asawaba
- Duuyin
- Foshegu
- Gariziegu
- Gbabshe
- Gbalahi
- Gbanyamli
- Gbrimah
- Gumbihini
- Gunnaayili
- Jatong-dakpemyili
- Jerigu
- Kanvil-tuunaayili
- Kasalgu
- Kobilmahagu
- Kogni
- Kootingli
- Kpanvo
- Kpawumo
- Kpeni
- Kpinjinga
- Kpuntaliga
- Kulaa
- Kulnyevila
- Lahagu
- Manguli
- Nachimbaya
- Namandu
- Nangbagu Yipala
- Ngarun
- Nyerizei
- Nyeshie
- Nyoheni
- Pagazaa
- Parishei
- Sorugu
- Sugashei
- Tampei-Kukuo
- Ticheli
- Tugu Yapalsi
- Tuutingli
- Vitin-dabogse
- Wamale
- Wayamba
- Wovugu
- Wurishe Kukuo
- Wulanyili
- Yagyili
- Yilonaayili
- Zakaliyili
- Zibogo
- Zuo
- Zuozugu

== See also ==
- Russian Bungalows

== Sources ==
- "Districts of Ghana". Statoids.
- GhanaDistricts.com
- Ghana statistical service
